= 19th Arkansas Infantry Regiment =

The 19th Arkansas Infantry Regiment was the designation of several units of the Confederate Army during the American Civil War. They were:

- 19th Arkansas Infantry Regiment (Dawson's), formed November 1861. In November 1863 it was consolidated to form the 8/19 AIR
- 19th Arkansas Infantry Regiment (Dockery's), formed April 1862, finished at Vicksburg July 1863
- 19th Arkansas Infantry Regiment (Hardy's), formed February 1863, it was consolidated in April 1864
