= Crawford's Arkansas Infantry Battalion =

Crawford's Arkansas Infantry Battalion (Confederate)
- Active: 1862–1863
- Country: Confederate States of America
- Allegiance: CSA
- Branch: Infantry
- Engagements: Battle of Arkansas Post

The Crawford's Arkansas Infantry Battalion (1862–1863) was a Confederate Army infantry battalion during the American Civil War.

== Organization ==
The unit was organized with two companies in the spring of 1862 and was mustered into Confederate service on June 23, 1862. The unit was composed of the following companies:

Company A, Commanded by Captain Joseph J. Ingram, organized at Pine Bluff, Arkansas, on June 23, 1862.
Company B, Commanded by Captain L. A. Weatherford, organized at Eagle Creek, Arkansas, on July 15, 1862.

On August 11, 1862, Lieutenant Colonel William A Crawford, who was from Benton in Saline County, and who originally commanded Company E, 1st Arkansas Infantry Regiment, was ordered to report to Colonel Robert G. Shaver to assume command of the "extra companies of the 19th Arkansas and the 33rd Arkansas. Colonel Shaver was acting as post commander of Pine Bluff and commander of the Camp of Instruction at Sulphur Springs, just outside Pine Bluff. The 19th and the 33rd had each been formed as "heavy regiments", with more men in each company than the seventy-five dictated by regulations and with more companies than the standard ten companies for an infantry regiment. It was apparently the intent of General Hindman that Crawford's new command would eventually be increased to regimental strength, but this did not occur before the Battle of Arkansas Post.

Lieutenant Colonel Crawford had been wounded during the battle Shiloh, in April 1862. When the 1st Arkansas was reorganized near Corinth following the battle of Shiloh, Crawford replaced Lieutenant Colonel Thompson, and was promoted to Lieutenant Colonel on May 18, 1862. Crawford apparently led the 1st Arkansas during the Battle of Farmington, but he resigned his position on July 21, 1862, and by August 1862 he was back in Arkansas organizing an infantry battalion from recruits and conscripts at Sulphur Springs. On September 28, 1862, his battalion was order to Clarendon Arkansas with the rest of the troops from Sulphur Springs.

== Battles ==
The battalion's only engagement was the Battle of Arkansas Post, Arkansas January 9–11, 1863. Crawford's Battalion was part of the 5,000 soldiers commanded by Confederate Brigadier General Thomas J. Churchill at Fort Hindman. The new year of 1863 brought a Federal invasion force of some 33,000 men and three ironclad gunboats, all under the overall command of Major General John A. McClernand, to Arkansas Post. On January 4, the Federal force attacked Fort Hindman from two directions. At 1:00 pm on January 11, 1863, the Federal ironclads Louisville, DeKalb, and Cincinnati on the Arkansas River commenced shelling the Confederate defenders, silencing Fort Hindman's cannons by around 4:00 pm. During the bombardment, the Arkansas soldiers fought off two attempts by the 3rd Missouri and 31st Iowa Infantries to turn the Confederate flank. Federal Brigadier General Alvin P. Hovey then directed two 12-pounder Napoleon cannons to shell the Arkansas positions; after two salvoes, white flags were displayed from the Confederate earthworks near the fort. Confusion ensued since some of the Southern defenders under Colonel James Deshler and adjacent to the 19th Arkansas Infantry kept firing their muskets despite the white flags. Negotiations then ensued between Confederate and Union commanders with Major General William Tecumseh Sherman asking Colonel Deshler "What does this mean? You are a regular officer, and ought to know better!" Deshler angrily replied that he had received no orders to surrender, but was then convinced by Confederate Brigadier General Churchill to have his men stack arms. Union casualties were reported as 134 killed, 989 wounded, and 29 missing; incomplete returns of Confederate losses indicated 60 killed and 80 wounded. However, 4,791 Confederate soldiers, including much of Crawford's Infantry Battalion, were captured.

=== Some members' avoidance of capture ===
It would seem at the time of the attack on Arkansas Post Crawford's Battalion was with the 24th Arkansas Infantry Regiment at St. Charles preparing to place two 8-inch 32-pounder smooth-bore columbiad guns from the CSS Ponchartrain in battery there. When the news of the battle at Arkansas Post reached them, most fit men made the forced march from that St. Charles to Arkansas Post but arrived just in time to surrender. Those left at St. Charles, about 200 men from the 24th and Crawford's Battalion loaded the two 8-inch columbiads onto the steamboat Bluewing, moved them up the White River to DeVal's Bluff and loaded them onto railroad flatcars to be shipped back to Little Rock. However, the Federal gunboats arrived before the train could leave and the guns were captured. The men had made their escape into the woods except for those who were in the hospital at DeVal's Bluff, who were paroled. It was the remnants of the portions of the 19th, 24th and Crawford's Battalion who made their way back to Sulphur Springs along with those who were in the hospital at DeVal's Bluff from the 19th along with Colonel Dawson that were organized into what was to later become Hardy's 19th Arkansas Infantry Regiment. Those members of Crawford's battalion who escaped capture at Arkansas Post were assigned to Company A, Hardy's Regiment Arkansas Infantry, about February 8, 1863.

=== Prisoners release in Virginia ===
The day following the surrender of Fort Hindman, January 12, 1863, lists of the Confederate prisoners were made before they were loaded onto Federal transport boats and departed for St. Louis; they arrived on January 24 amid chunks of ice floating downstream the Mississippi River with snow falling. The enlisted men of the 19th Arkansas Infantry arrived at Alton, Illinois, on January 28 before departing in railroad cars to Chicago, where they arrived on January 29, and being confined in unheated barracks at Camp Douglas. The bitter cold took its toll of the unaccustomed Southern soldiers. Twelve froze to death one night before they were moved to heated buildings. During February 1863, 387 of 3,884 Confederate prisoners in Camp Douglas died – a loss of 10% in a single month. Exposure, disease, and poor diet killed 189 (30%) of the soldiers in the 19th Arkansas Infantry during their three-month imprisonment. Camp Douglas records indicate that the prisoners died from smallpox, typhoid, pneumonia, congestive heart failure, meningitis, and diarrhea (dysentery). Most, but not all of the dead POWs were buried in a mass grave in the Chicago Oak Woods Cemetery. Some survived by taking the Oath of Allegiance to the United States and were released. Most of the survivors of Crawford's Battalion were exchanged and released from Camp Douglas on April 2, 1863, before arriving at City Point, Virginia, via railroad on April 10, 1863.

From City Point, the former prisoners boarded ships for Williamsburg, Virginia, on April 11, 1863, and then went by railroad to Petersburg, Virginia, where they rested and recovered from their prison ordeal. On May 4, they were assembled and issued new arms and equipment before again taking trains to Richmond, Virginia, where they were reunited with their officers (imprisoned elsewhere in Federal prison camps) on May 6, 1863. The soldiers departed Richmond by train on May 11, reaching Tullahoma, Tennessee, on May 17 where they were reorganized and placed in the division of Major General Patrick Ronayne Cleburne, Hardee's Corps, Army of Tennessee under overall command of Lieutenant General Braxton Bragg. At this time the survivors of Crawford's battalion were consolidated with the survivors of the 19th Arkansas Infantry and the 24th Arkansas Infantry, on May 23, 1863 into the new formed 19th and 24th Consolidated Arkansas Infantry Regiment.

== See also ==
- List of Confederate units from Arkansas
- Confederate Units by State
