= 8th Arkansas Infantry Regiment =

Infantry regiment of the Confederate States Army

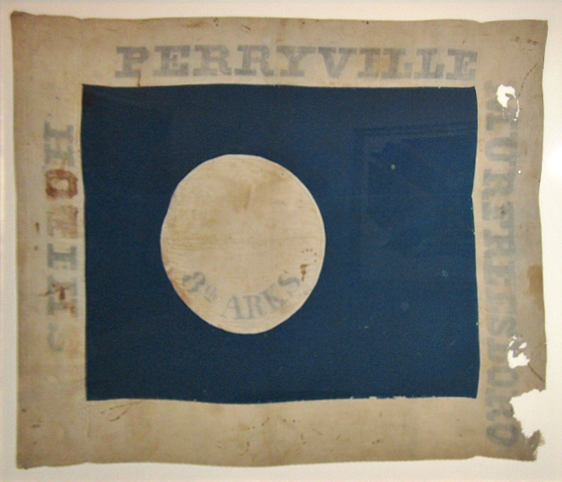
- Regimental Color of the Eighth Arkansas at the Texas Civil War Museum in Fort Worth, Texas
- Active: 1861–1865
- Disbanded: April 26, 1865
- Country: Confederate States
- Allegiance: Arkansas
- Branch: Army
- Type: Infantry
- Size: Regiment
- Facings: Light blue
- Battles: American Civil War; Battle of Shiloh; Siege of Corinth; Battle of Perryville; Battle of Murfreesboro; Battle of Liberty Gap; Battle of Chickamauga; Battle of Missionary Ridge; Battle of Ringgold Gap; Battle of Rocky Face Ridge; Battle of Resaca; Battle of New Hope Church; Battle of Kennesaw Mountain; Battle of Pickett's Mill; Battle of Peachtree Creek; Battle of Atlanta; Battle of Jonesboro; Battle of Franklin; Battle of Nashville; Battle of Bentonville
- Battle honors: Shiloh; Perryville; Murfreesboro

8th Arkansas Infantry Regiment (also known as the "Eighth Arkansas") was an infantry formation in the Confederate States Army during the American Civil War. It served throughout the war in the western theater, seeing action in the Kentucky, Tennessee and Georgia campaigns. Following its depletion in numbers the regiment was consolidated several times with other Arkansas regiments, finally merging in 1865 into the 1st Arkansas Consolidated Infantry Regiment.

== Formation ==
The unit was enrolled in state service on July 13, 1861, at Camp Price near Jacksonport, Arkansas. The unit was inducted into Confederate Service on September 10, 1861. The unit was originally composed of units from the following counties:

  - Company A, of Jackson County, commanded by Captain Robert Anthony.
  - Company B, of Jackson County, commanded by Captain James H. Wilson.
  - Company C, of Independence County, commanded by Captain George W. McCauley.
  - Company D, of Independence County, commanded by Captain Thomas J. Morgan. This unit was originally organized on June 8, 1861, as a volunteer militia company in the 59th Regiment, Arkansas State Militia.
  - Company E, the "Independence Guards", of Independence County, commanded by Captain Justus F. Tracy. This unit was originally organized on February 15, 1861, as a volunteer militia company in the 59th Regiment, Arkansas State Militia.
  - Company F, the "West Point Rifles", of White County, commanded by Captain A. T. Jones. This unit, also "West Point Rangers" was originally organized on May 29, 1861, as a volunteer militia company in the 65th Regiment, Arkansas State Militia under the command of Captain Joseph F. Hathaway.
  - Company G, of Jackson County, commanded by Captain William H. Gray.
  - Company H, of Independence County (that portion now encompassed by Cleburne County), commanded by Captain Enoch N. Floyd.
  - Company I, of Jackson County, commanded by Captain Winfield S. Smalley.
  - Company K, of Randolph County, commanded by Captain James P. Wright.

The original regimental officers of the 8th Arkansas were:

  - Colonel William K. Patterson.
  - Lieutenant Colonel Henry M. Couch.
  - Major John A. Price.
  - Sergeant Major T. H. Hubbard.
  - Surgeon Lycurgus A. Dickson.
  - Chaplain John H. Mann.
  - Adjutant Henry J. McCurdy.
  - Quartermaster Elbert L. Watson.

The regiment was armed with weapons which the state confiscated when the Federal Arsenal at Little Rock was seized by Arkansas State Militia troops in February 1861. Disposition of the weapons found in the Arsenal is somewhat sketchy, but from various records it can be surmised that the 5th, 6th, 7th, and 8th Arkansas Infantry Regiments, mustered in June, 1861, were issued M1816/M1822 .69 caliber flintlocks. They retained these weapons until April, 1862 when they were able to exchange them for better weapons scavenged from the battlefield at Shiloh.

== History ==
=== Battles ===
The 8th Arkansas saw no action in the coming months, only taking part in a small raid into Missouri with General Hardee's Command. By October 1861, the regiment, along with the rest of General Hardee's division had been sent to Columbus, Kentucky, to become the Army of Central Kentucky. After the losses of Fort Henry and Fort Donelson in February 1862, Confederate General Albert Sidney Johnston withdrew his forces into western Tennessee, northern Mississippi, and Alabama to reorganize. and then retreated through western Tennessee to northern Mississippi. On March 29, 1862, the Army of Central Kentucky was merged into the Army of Mississippi in preparation for the Battle of Shiloh.

The 8th Arkansas was assigned to Brigadier General Sterling A. M. Wood's brigade of Major General William J. Hardee's Corps of the Army of Mississippi. When Brigadier General Woods was wounded during the battle, Colonel Patterson assumed command of the brigade. The regiment suffered heavy casualties on both days of the battle. Lieutenant Thomas Bateman was killed, and Lieutenants Perryman, Cates, Harris and Richardson were wounded. On April 26, 1862, the entire regiment totaled 272 men. In his after action report regarding the Battle of Shiloh, Colonel Patterson commented:

During the entire engagement the men and officers generally exhibited cool, determined gallantry, often exposing themselves to serious fire in squads by irregularity caused by an earnest desire to advance, and it is a melancholy fact that we lost more men in proportion to the wounds, in those places where irregular firing in the rear occurred than in engagements where we were exposed alone to the guns of the enemy. The enemy often wounded but rarely killed us.

In May 1862 the Confederate Army underwent an army-wide reorganization due to the passage of the Conscription Act by the Confederate Congress in April 1862. All twelve-month regiments had to re-muster and enlist for two years or the duration of the war; a new election of officers was ordered; and men who were exempted from service by age or other reasons under the Conscription Act were allowed to take a discharge and go home. Officers who did not choose to stand for re-election were also offered a discharge. The reorganization was accomplished among all the Arkansas regiments in and around Corinth, Mississippi, following the Battle of Shiloh.

On May 7, 1862, the original members of the 8th Arkansas were consolidated into five companies and united with the 7th and 9th Arkansas Infantry Battalions. The reorganized regiment was composed of the following companies:

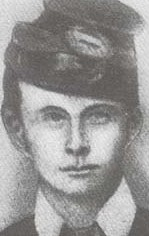
Colonel John H. Kelly, became the youngest General Officer in the Confederate Army.

  - Company A — Originally Companies B & K of the 8th Arkansas Infantry Regiment from Jackson county.
  - Company B — Originally Companies D & I of the 8th Arkansas Infantry Regiment from Jackson county.
  - Company C — Originally Companies E & H of the 8th Arkansas Infantry Regiment from Independence county.
  - Company D — Originally Companies C & F of the 8th Arkansas Infantry Regiment, from Independence and White counties.
  - Company E — Originally Companies A & G of the 8th Arkansas Infantry Regiment from Independence county.
  - Company F — Originally Companies B & C of the 9th Arkansas Infantry Battalion, which were also (originally Companies B & E, of the (McCarver's) 14th Arkansas Infantry Regiment).
  - Company G — Originally Companies A & D. of the 9th Arkansas Infantry Battalion, Izard and Jackson county (originally Companies A & H, of the (McCarver's) 14th Arkansas Infantry Regiment)
  - Company H — Originally Companies B & C, of the 7th Arkansas Infantry Battalion, from Independence county.
  - Company I — Originally Companies D & F, of the 7th Arkansas Infantry Battalion, from Jackson county.
  - Company K — Originally Companies A & E, of the 7th Arkansas Infantry Battalion.

Upon reorganization, John H. Kelly was elected colonel; Wilson, lieutenant colonel, and Capt. G. F. Baucum, major. Lieutenant-Colonel Wilson resigned, and Anderson Watkins was elected major. Upon the promotion of Colonel Kelly to brigadier-general, Baucum became colonel, and Anderson Watkins, lieutenant colonel.

The regiment took part in the battle of Murfreesboro, as part of Liddell's brigade, of Cleburne's Division, and captured two stand of colors, which were taken by Private James Riddle, of Company C, and Corporal N. A. Horn, of Company E. Colonel Kelly was wounded the second day and borne off the field, and Lieutenant Colonel G. F. Baucum assumed command of the regiment. Lieutenants T. H. Beard, S. B. Cole, Colvin Ead and H. J. McCurdy, of the Eighth, were killed. Its casualties were 29 killed and 124 wounded at Murfreesboro.

By the time of the Chickamauga Campaign in September 1863, Colonel Daniel C. Govan had assumed command of Liddell's Brigade. The 8th Arkansas would continue to serve in Govan's Brigade until the end of the war. Its casualties were 14 killed, 92 wounded, and 65 missing at Chickamauga.

Due to the casualties suffered at Chickamauga, the regiment was consolidated with the 19th Arkansas for the Chattanooga campaign The regiment was in the battles of Missionary Ridge, Ringgold Gap under Lieutenant Colonel Augustus S. Hutchison of the 19th Arkansas. The 8th/19th Arkansas lost 16 men at Ringgold Gap, totaled 363 men and 265 arms in December, 1863.

When General Joseph E. Johnston assumed command of the Army of Tennessee to oppose General Sherman's Atlanta campaign, Govan's Brigade was reorganized but the 8th and 19th regmained consolidated. The 8th/19th Arkansas participated in the battles of Resaca, Kennesaw Mountain, Peachtree Creek, Ezra Church and Atlanta It sustained 32 killed (including Lt. Colonel Anderson Watkins), 33 wounded (including Colonel Baucum and Lt. Colonel Hutchison), and 32 missing at Atlanta, and fielded 181 effectives on July 23. The regiment and it colors were captured, along with much of Govan's Brigade at the Battle of Jonesboro, Georgia, on Sept. 1, 1864. Due to a special cartel between Union General Sherman and Confederate General John B. Hood, the unit was quickly paroled and exchanged for Union prisoner held at Andersonville Prison. The regiment re-entered service approximately a month later.

The 8th/19 Arkansas and the rest of Govan's Brigade were released and exchanged just in time to participate in General John B. Hood's disastrous Franklin-Nashville Campaign. The 8th/19th was under the command of Major D.H. Hamiter at the Battle of Franklin. Govan's entire brigade numbered just 550 rifles and sustained 66% casualties during the Battle of Franklin.

The remnants of Govan's Brigade that survived the Tennessee Campaign remained with the Army of Tennessee through its final engagements in the 1865 Carolinas campaign. The 8th Arkansas would be credited with participation in the following battles:

- Battle of Shiloh, Tennessee, April 6–7, 1862.
- Siege of Corinth, April to June 1862.
- Battle of Perryville, Kentucky, October 8, 1862.
- Battle of Murfreesboro, Tennessee, December 31, 1862, to January 3, 1863.
- Tullahoma Campaign, June 1863.
  - Battle of Liberty Gap, Tennessee, June 24–26, 1863.
- Chickamauga Campaign, Georgia, August–September, 1863.
  - Battle of Chickamauga, Georgia, September 19–20, 1863.
- Chattanooga campaign, September to November 1863.
  - Battle of Missionary Ridge, Tennessee, November 25, 1863.
  - Battle of Ringgold Gap, Georgia, November 27, 1863.
- Atlanta campaign, May to September 1864.
  - Battle of Rocky Face Ridge, Georgia, May 5–11, 1864.
  - Battle of Resaca, Georgia, May 14–15, 1864.
  - Battle of New Hope Church, Georgia, May 25 – June 4, 1864.
  - Battle of Pickett's Mill, Georgina, May 27, 1864.
  - Battle of Kennesaw Mountain, Georgia, June 27, 1864.
  - Battle of Peachtree Creek, Georgia, July 20, 1864.
  - Siege of Atlanta, Georgia, July 22, 1864.
  - Battle of Jonesboro, Georgia, August 31 to September 1, 1864.
- Franklin–Nashville Campaign, September 18 to December 27, 1864.
  - Battle of Spring Hill, Tennessee, November 29, 1864.
  - Battle of Franklin, Tennessee, November 30, 1864.
  - Battle of Nashville, Tennessee, December 15–16, 1864.
- Carolinas campaign, February to April 1865.
  - Battle of Bentonville, North Carolina, March 19–21, 1865.

=== Consolidation and surrender ===
The remnants of ten depleted Arkansas regiments, along with one mostly-Arkansas regiment, in the Army of Tennessee were consolidated into a single regiment at Smithfield, North Carolina, on April 9, 1865.

The 1st Arkansas, was lumped together with the 2nd, 5th, 6th, 7th, 8th, 15th, 19th and 24th Arkansas Infantry Regiments and the 3rd Confederate Infantry Regiment as the 1st Arkansas Consolidated Infantry on April 9, 1865. On April 26, 1865, the 1st Arkansas Consolidated Infantry Regiment was present with the Army of Tennessee when it surrendered in Greensboro, North Carolina.

== Regimental colors ==
The national color of the Eighth Arkansas is a circle of ten stars appears in this flag, elaborated by an "A" superimposed over the central and eleventh star. Presumably, the star outside the circle represents Missouri, admitted in August, 1861 by the Provisional Congress. The flag was presented to the unit raised in Jacksonport by William Patterson in the summer of 1861. Ladies of the town distinguished the flag with gold embroidered chain stitch, "March on! March on! All hearts resolved on victory or death". This flag was most likely retired when flags in the Hardee pattern were issued to the Army of Central Kentucky in early 1862. First Confederate National Flag pattern variation. Cotton, red wool, red silk fringe and gold embroidery, 21" x 39". Currently held at Old State House Museum, Little Rock Arkansas.

The first regimental colors of the Eighth Arkansas is extremely large, measuring 56 and 1/2 by 59 inches. The flag bears an inverted pair of crossed cannons, which is an honor for having captured a battery of field artillery. The words, "CLEBURNE'S DIV" and "GOVAN's BRIGADE" surround the cannons. This flag is currently located at the Battle Abbey, Virginia Historical Society, Richmond, Virginia. The second regimental color of the Eighth Arkansas is an example of Hardee flags. The second flag, probably issued in the summer of 1863, bore the battle honors "SHILOH", "PERRYVILLE", and "MURFREESBORO". Brigadier General John H. Kelly took this flag home and it remained in his family for many years. The flag is currently located at the Texas Civil War Museum, Fort Worth, TX.

The Regimental Color of the 8th and 19th Arkansas is an example of an 1864 Hardee flag. It was produced and decorated specifically for the combined unit, displaying battle honors of each. The poorly dyed blue field, now faded to pea green, is typical of the 1864 flags. When it was captured at Jonesboro, Georgia, on September 1, 1864, the flag was identified as that of an artillery battery. The honor of crossed cannon, as well as the unit's position supporting Key's Battery, caused the confused attribution. Hardee Battle flag pattern, Cleburne's Division 1864 issue. Cotton with black and white paint, 35" x 34 1/2" remaining. War Department Capture Number 206. Currently located at the Old State House Museum, Little Rock Arkansas.

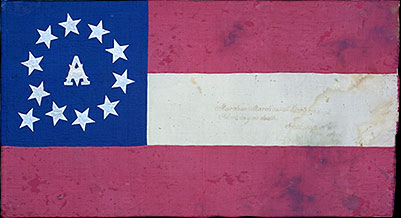
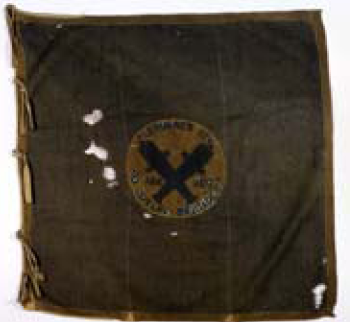
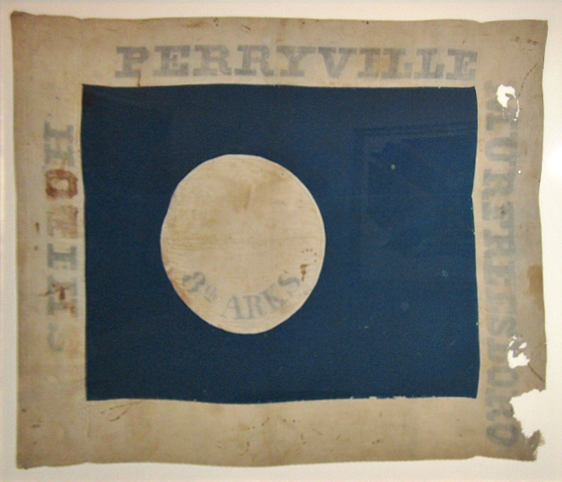
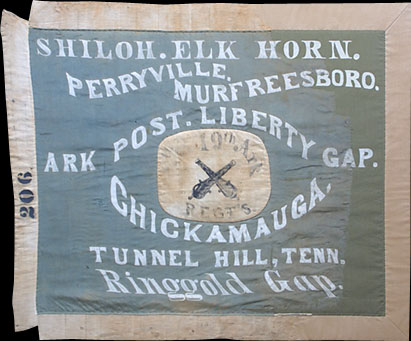
National Color of the Eighth Arkansas	Regimental Color of the Eighth Arkansas	Regimental Color of the Eighth Arkansas	Regimental Color of the 8th and 19th Arkansas

== See also ==
- List of Confederate units from Arkansas
- Confederate Units by State
