= Fighting Fifth =

Fighting Fifth is a may refer to:

- Royal Northumberland Fusiliers a former regiment of the British Army
  - Fighting Fifth Hurdle, a hurdling horse race in the United Kingdom named for the regiment.
- 5th Arkansas Infantry, a Confederate States Army infantry unit
- 5th Marine Regiment, a United States Marine Corps infantry unit
- Zone Five of the Pittsburgh Police
