= 24th Arkansas Infantry Regiment =

- Active: 1862–1865
- Disbanded: April 26, 1865
- Country: Confederate States
- Allegiance: Arkansas
- Branch: Army
- Type: Infantry
- Size: Regiment
- Facings: Light blue
- Engagements: American Civil War: Battle of Arkansas Post; Battle of Murfreesboro; Chickamauga Campaign; Battle of Chickamauga; Chattanooga campaign; Battle of Missionary Ridge; Battle of Ringgold Gap; Atlanta campaign; Battle of Rocky Face Ridge; Battle of Resaca; Battle of New Hope Church; Battle of Pickett's Mill; Battle of Kennesaw Mountain; Battle of Peachtree Creek; Battle of Atlanta; Siege of Atlanta; Battle of Jonesboro; Franklin–Nashville Campaign; Battle of Franklin; Battle of Nashville; Carolinas campaign; Battle of Bentonville

The 24th Arkansas Infantry (1861–1865) was a Confederate Army infantry regiment during the American Civil War. The unit began its service in the Department of the Trans-Mississippi, but the bulk of the unit was captured at the Battle of Arkansas Post and shipped to Northern prison camps. The unit was exchanged in Virginia and shipped to Tennessee and joined the Army of Tennessee in time for the Chattanooga Campaign and remained with the army through the Atlanta Campaign, the Franklin-Nashville Campaign and ended the war in North Carolina.

== Organization ==
The 24th Arkansas Infantry Regiment was organized at White Sulphur Springs, Arkansas, on June 6, 1862. The field officers were Colonel E. E. Portlock, Jr.; Lieutenant Colonels W. R. Hardy, E. Warfield, and T. M. Whittington; and Major F. H. Wood. The unit was composed of units from the following area:

- Company A – Commanded by Captain H. Herndon, organized in Sevier County, Arkansas, on March 1, 1862.
- Company B – Commanded by Captain Francis H. Wood, organized in Palestine, Arkansas, on May 12, 1862.
- Company C – Commanded by Captain J. A. Rader, organized at Falcon, Arkansas, June 16, 1862.
- Company D – Commanded by Captain J. H. Edwards, organized at Warren, Arkansas, June 16, 1862.
- Company E – "Drew County Grays" – commanded by Captain William P. Totter, organized in Monticello, Arkansas, June 16, 1862.
- Company F – Commanded by Captain William H. Prescott organized at Washington, Arkansas June 21, 1862.
- Company G – Commanded by Captain Benjamin F. McKnight, organized in Calhoun County, Arkansas, July 4, 1862.
- Company H – Commanded by Captain Ezekiel Brown, organized in Dallas, Arkansas, June 25, 1862.
- Company I – Commanded by Captain John S. Drake, organized in Danville, Arkansas, June 20, 1862.
- Company K – Commanded by Captain J. R. Arnold, organized in Pike County, Arkansas, June 11, 1862.

== Service ==
A large portion of the 24th Arkansas Infantry Regiment was captured at Arkansas Post, Arkansas, on January 11, 1863. The portion of the regiment which was captured was paroled on April 10, 1863, at City Point, Virginia and was reassigned to the Army of Tennessee. The 24th Arkansas was involved in the East Tennessee, Georgia and North Carolina campaigns. The portion of the 24th Arkansas not captured at Arkansas Post was consolidated with the remainders of Crawford's Infantry Battalion and Dawson's 19th Arkansas Infantry Regiment and became Hardy's 19th and 24th Consolidated Arkansas Infantry Regiment early in 1863.

=== African Americans in Confederate Service ===
The men who were captured on January 11, 1863, at Arkansas Post, Arkansas, were sent to Military Prison at Camp Douglas, Illinois, and were then delivered to City Point, Virginia, on April 10, 1863. The records of these prisoners bear the following notation:

City Point VA. April 10, 1863. "Received this 10th day of April 1863 from Cpt A. Bartlett, 9th Ver. Vols. USA (520) five hundred and twenty confederate prisoners of war and one Negro Boy, stated to be a prisoner of war." J.H. Thompson, Commanding at City Point, VA.

This Confederate prisoner shown as "Negro Boy," was likely a grown man, the term "boy" being a pejorative term used by his Yankee captor.

=== Release to the Army of Tennessee ===
Of the 366 exchanged, as many as 58 either died, separated from the 24th Arkansas or left sick; about 308 men returned to service. Some 71 men had been captured but could not be accounted for. A few of these were possibly exchanged later, probably no more than a dozen at best, making the regimental strength about 320 following the exchange. The regiment was at Tullahoma for a month, under the command of Lt. Col. Augustus S. Hutchinson, where they were attached to the brigade of Brig. Gen. Thomas J. Churchill, as before. With other Arkansas and Texas troops, they were in the division of Major General Patrick Cleburne in Hardee's Corps, a part of the Army of Tennessee under the command of Lieutenant General Braxton Bragg. The company strengths at this time were:

- Company A – 2 officers and 36 enlisted men, total 38.
- Company B – 3 officers and 32 enlisted men, total 35.
- Company C – 3 officers and 27 enlisted men, total 30.
- Company D – 1 officer and 30 enlisted men, total 31.
- Company E – 3 officers and 27 enlisted men, total 30.
- Company F – 4 officers and 30 enlisted men, total 34.
- Company G – 4 officers and 28 enlisted men, total 32.
- Company H – 2 officers and 58 enlisted men, total 60.
- Company I – 3 officers and 40 enlisted men, total 43.
- Company K – 3 officers and 23 enlisted men, total 26.
- Regt Staff – 4 officers and 1 enlisted man, total 5.

The portion of the regiment which was reformed in the Army of Tennessee was assigned to Deshler's, Liddell's, and Govan's Brigades, and in September 1863, consolidated with the 19th (Dawson's) Regiment. The 19th/24th lost thirty-eight percent of the 226 engaged at the Battle of Chickamauga.

=== Chattanooga Campaign ===
In December 1863 the 24th Arkansas Infantry was added to the consolidated 2nd/15th Arkansas, under the Command of Lieutenant Colonel E. Warfield and the 2nd/15th/24th totaled 295 men and 202 arms in December 1863. On December 29, 1863, Colonel Daniel Govan of the 2nd Arkansas was promoted to the rank of brigadier general. The consolidated unit participated in all the battles of the Chattanooga-Ringgold Campaign including the Siege of Chattanooga September to November 1863; Battle of Chattanooga, the Battle of Ringgold Gap.

=== Atlanta Campaign ===
When General Joseph E. Johnston assumed command of the Army of Tennessee to oppose General Sherman's Atlanta campaign, Govan's Brigade was reorganized and only the 2nd and 24th were united. The 2nd/24th Arkansas participated in the battles of Dalton, Resaca, New Hope Church, Kennesaw Mountain, Atlanta, and the Siege of Atlanta. The consolidated 2nd/24th Arkansas reported 130 casualties during the campaign.

The regiment and it colors were captured, along with much of Govan's Brigade at the Battle of Jonesboro, Georgia, on Sept. 1, 1864. Due to a special cartel between Union General Sherman and Confederate General John B. Hood, the unit was quickly paroled and exchanged for Union prisoner held at Andersonville Prison. The regiment re-entered service approximately a month later.

=== Franklin-Nashville Campaign ===
The regiment and the rest of Govan's Brigade was released in time to participate in General John B. Hood's disastrous Franklin-Nashville Campaign. Due to the appalling losses suffered by Govan's Brigade during the Atlanta Campaign, the 1st/15th, 5th/13th and 2nd/24th Arkansas Regiments were consolidated into one regiment, which was commanded by Colonel Peter Green of the 5th/13th (specifically of the 5th). The other officers of the consolidated regiment were Major Alexander T. Meek, of the 2nd/24th Arkansas, Captain Mordecai P. Garrett and Sergeant Major Thomas Benton Moncrief of the 15th Arkansas. The consolidated regiment fought under the colors of the consolidated 5th/13th Arkansas Regiment, because this was one of the only colors not captured when Govan's Brigade was overrun at the Battle of Jonesboro. The flag of the combined 5th/13th Arkansas was issued in March 1864 and was captured by Benjamin Newman of the 88th Illinois Infantry at the battle of Franklin. The consolidated regiment numbered just 300 rifles and sustained 66% casualties during the Battle of Franklin.

=== Carolinas Campaign ===
The remnants of Govan's Brigade that survived the Tennessee Campaign remained with the Army of Tennessee through its final engagements in the 1865 Carolinas campaign. Major Alexander T. Meek was killed in the attack and now buried in the Carnton Confederate Cemetery in Franklin, Tennessee.

=== Campaign Credit ===
The 24th Arkansas Infantry Regiment participated in the following engagements:

- Battle of Arkansas Post, Arkansas, January 11, 1863.
- Chickamauga Campaign, Georgia, August–September, 1863.
  - Battle of Chickamauga, Georgia, September 19–20, 1863.
- Chattanooga campaign, September to November 1863.
  - Battle of Missionary Ridge, Tennessee, November 25, 1863.
  - Battle of Ringgold Gap, Georgia, November 27, 1863.
- Atlanta campaign, May to September 1864.
  - Battle of Rocky Face Ridge, Georgia, May 5–11, 1864.
  - Battle of Resaca, Georgia, May 14–15, 1864.
  - Battle of New Hope Church, Georgia, May 25 - June 4, 1864.
  - Battle of Kennesaw Mountain, Georgia, June 27, 1864.
  - Battle of Peachtree Creek, Georgia, July 20, 1864.
  - Siege of Atlanta, Georgia, July 22, 1864.
  - Battle of Jonesboro, Georgia, August 31 to September 1, 1864.
- Franklin–Nashville Campaign September 18 to December 27, 1864.
  - Battle of Spring Hill, Tennessee, November 29, 1864.
  - Battle of Franklin, Tennessee, November 30, 1864.
  - Battle of Nashville, Tennessee, December 15–16, 1864.
- Carolinas campaign, February to April 1865.
  - Battle of Bentonville, North Carolina, March 19–21, 1865.

== Consolidation and Surrender ==
The remnants of ten depleted Arkansas regiments, along with one mostly-Arkansas regiment, in the Army of Tennessee were consolidated into a single regiment at Smithfield, North Carolina, on April 9, 1865. The 1st Arkansas, was lumped together with the 2nd, 5th, 6th, 7th, 8th, 15th, 19th and 24th Arkansas Infantry Regiments and the 3rd Confederate Infantry Regiment as the 1st Arkansas Consolidated Infantry on April 9, 1865. On April 26, 1865, the 1st Arkansas Consolidated Infantry Regiment was present with the Army of Tennessee when it surrendered in Greensboro, North Carolina.

== See also ==
- List of Confederate units from Arkansas
- Confederate Units by State
