= 7th Arkansas Infantry Regiment =

Infantry regiment of the Confederate States Army

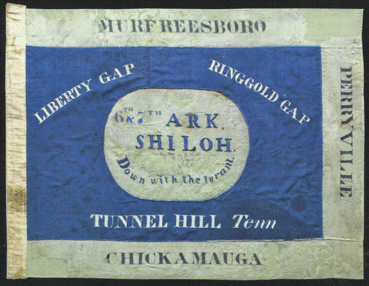
- Regimental color of the 6th and 7th Arkansas at the Old State House Museum in Little Rock, Arkansas
- Active: 1861–1865
- Disbanded: April 26, 1865
- Country: Confederate States
- Allegiance: Arkansas
- Branch: Army
- Type: Infantry
- Size: Regiment
- Facings: Light blue
- Battles: American Civil War; Battle of Shiloh; Second Battle of Corinth; Battle of Perryville; Battle of Murfreesboro; Battle of Liberty Gap; Battle of Chickamauga; Battle of Missionary Ridge; Battle of Ringgold Gap; Battle of Rocky Face Ridge; Battle of Resaca; Battle of New Hope Church; Battle of Pickett's Mill; Battle of Kennesaw Mountain; Battle of Peachtree Creek; Battle of Atlanta; Battle of Jonesboro; Battle of Franklin; Battle of Nashville; Battle of Bentonville

The 7th Arkansas Infantry Regiment was an infantry formation of the Confederate States Army in the Western Theater of the American Civil War.

Organized mainly from companies, including several prewar volunteer militia companies, raised in northeastern Arkansas, the regiment was among the first transferred to Confederate service, and spent virtually the entire war serving east of the Mississippi River. After the unit sustained heavy casualties in the Battle of Shiloh and the Kentucky Campaign, the unit spent most of the rest of the war field consolidated with the 6th Arkansas Infantry Regiment to form the 6th/7th Arkansas Infantry Regiment.

== Formation ==
The 7th Arkansas was mustered into state service on June 16, 1861, at Smithville in Lawrence County, Arkansas. The unit was inducted into Confederate service in July 1861 at Camp Shaver, near Pocahontas, Arkansas.

The regimental staff at the time of organization of the 7th Arkansas were:

- Colonel Robert G. Shaver, formerly Colonel of the 60th Arkansas Militia Regiment, of Lawrence County.
- Lieutenant Colonel William R. Cain
- Major James T. Martin
- Adjutant John M. Dean
- Quartermaster H. C. Tunsell
- Commissary John S. Shaver
- Surgeon Dr. Bohannon
- Assistant Surgeon Dr. Hoadley

The company officers at the time of organization were:

- Company A, of Randolph County, commanded by Captain Joseph C. Martin
- Company B, the "Glaize Rifles," of Jackson County, commanded by Captain George E. Orme. This unit was originally organized as a volunteer militia company in the 34th Arkansas Militia Regiment, Jackson County, on December 28, 1860.
- Company C, of Marion county, commanded by Captain James Archer. Archer resigned before the company was mustered into service and was succeeded by Captain William M. Blackburn, whose date of rank was July 26, 1861, the date of muster.
- Company D, the "Dick Johnson Guards", of Lawrence county, commanded by Captain Carney C. Straughan. This unit was originally organized as a volunteer militia company in the 60th Arkansas Militia Regiment, Lawrence County, on June 17, 1861.
- Company E, the "Pike Guards", of Independence County, commanded by Captain John H. Dye
- Company F, of Randolph county, commanded by Captain Thomas J. Mellon
- Company G, of Independence County, commanded by Captain Ganum Brightwell
- Company H, of Izard County, commanded by Captain D. G. Deason
- Company I, of Fulton county, commanded by Captain Michael V. Shaver
- Company K, the "Arkansas Guards" of White County, Captain John C. McCauley This unit was originally organized in September 1860, under the command of Captain, later Brigadier General, Dandridge McRea. The company participated in the seizure of the Little Rock Arsenal in February 1861 under the command of Captain McRea.

Lieutenant Colonel Cain resigned at Camp Shaver because of failing health, and was replaced by John M. Dean as lieutenant colonel and Jack Horne as adjutant. Commissary Shaver resigned at about the same time, and John D. Sprigg replaced him.

The unit's field officers were Colonels Robert G. Shaver and D. A. Gillespie; Lieutenant Colonels W. R. Cain, John M. Dean, James Rutherford, and Peter Snyder; and Majors John A. Hill, James T. Martin, and John C. McCauley.

The regiment was armed with weapons which the state confiscated when the Federal Arsenal at Little Rock was seized by Arkansas State Militia troops in February 1861. Disposition of the weapons found in the Arsenal is somewhat sketchy, but from various records it can be surmised that the 5th, 6th, 7th, and 8th Arkansas Infantry Regiments, mustered in June, 1861, were issued M1816/M1822 .69 caliber flintlocks. They retained these weapons until April, 1862 when they were able to exchange them for better weapons scavenged from the battlefield at Shiloh.

The regiment remained in state service about six weeks, when General Hardee was ordered to make transfer of the state regiments into Confederate service. In making these transfers, nearly all the regiments lost the equivalent of a company, as some men declined to re-enlist for Confederate service and were discharged. The 7th Arkansas transferred with the loss of only 17 men who refused to re-enlist as "Confederate troops". Captain C. C. Straughan of Co. G and Captain James F. Archer of Co. H retired, and were replaced by Captain Warner and Captain Blackburn, respectively.

== History ==
The 7th Arkansas saw no action in the coming months, only taking part in a small raid into Missouri with General Hardee's Command. The 7th Arkansas was ordered to Pittman's Ferry, where it was drilled and disciplined by General Hardee in person until the last of August, when Hardee's brigade marched by land to Point Pleasant, MO on the Mississippi River, and then traveled by steamboat to the Confederate stronghold at Columbus, KY. By October 1861, the regiment, along with the rest of General Hardee's division had been sent to Columbus, Kentucky, to become the Army of Central Kentucky. From Columbus the brigade moved to Bowling Green, KY, in October, where it was assigned to the division commanded by General Simon B. Buckner. Here, Col. Shaver was appointed to command a newly formed brigade made up of the 7th and 8th Arkansas regiments, the 19th Tennessee, and a battalion of the 9th Arkansas. Shaver's Brigade remained at Bowling Green until February, 1862, when that place was evacuated.

After the losses of Fort Henry and Fort Donelson in February 1862, Confederate General Albert Sidney Johnston withdrew his forces into western Tennessee, northern Mississippi, and Alabama to reorganize. Shaver's brigade guarded the Confederate rear during this retreat from Bowling Green, being shelled by the artillery of Buell's advance while the last trains of stores were being loaded. On leaving, Col. Shaver, by order of Gen. Hardee, burned the depot and took down the telegraph wires. It was during the worst month in that climate, with rain and snow and the thermometer at night below zero, when this retreat was made. The 7th was caused to stand at arms all night by a report that a large force of Buell's army was coming on its heels, which turned out to be Helm's Kentucky cavalry coming in his rear by an unexpected order of march. General A.S. Johnston, at Nashville, sent a message to Colonel Shaver that the enemy's cavalry was advancing on his rear. This was made known to General Wood, of Alabama, who had taken command of the brigade during the retreat. General Wood refused to wait for the rear guard, and for this reason Colonel Shaver applied for and secured a transfer of the 7th to Hindman's brigade. The regiment reached Nashville ten days after the fall of Fort Donelson, and went there to Murfreesboro. On March 29, 1862, the Army of Central Kentucky was merged into the Army of Mississippi in preparation for the Battle of Shiloh. From Murfreesboro the 7th went to Decatur and thence to Courtland, Alabama, and went into camp at Corinth, Mississippi, to await the concentration of the Confederate armies to meet the federal advance through Tennessee.

=== Shiloh ===
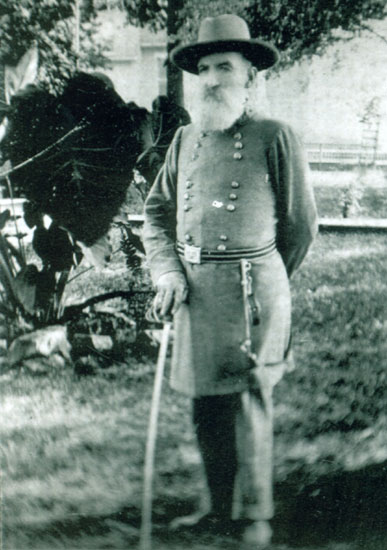
Colonel Robert F. Shaver commanded both the 7th and the Arkansas infantry regiments

During the Battle of Shiloh, General Hardee nicknamed this unit "The Bloody Seventh." The 7th Arkansas had been formed with 905 officers and men, but after the conflict at Shiloh there were only 380 present. Colonel Shaver was assigned to command a brigade, which consisted of the 2nd, 6th and 7th Arkansas Infantry Regiments. Shaver's Brigade struck the first blow in the battle before sunrise on April 6, 1862. The Arkansas troops initially rushed into a Union camp of two German regiments from St. Louis, MO, and regiments from Iowa, Wisconsin and Illinois—all commanded by Colonel Peabody. When the pickets' fire was heard in the Union encampment, Colonel Peabody's men took up defensive positions on the edge of their camp and laid down heavy fire. Shaver's Brigade rushed them with a wild Rebel yell. The Union troops stood their ground until the Arkansas soldiers were within 30 feet of them and then they broke and fled. The Shaver's men pushed in amongst the retreating Union soldiers and a fierce hand-to-hand melee followed. Many Union troops were bayoneted, including Colonel Peabody. Shaver's Brigade had rushed forward so fast that General Hardee halted them at that point until the line of battle could catch up. The 7th Arkansas, together with most of the Arkansas troops at the Battle of Shiloh, was armed mainly with flintlock muskets, flintlock & percussion shotguns and various other outdated smooth bore weapons supplied from the soldiers' own homes. In Colonel Peabody's camp they found 2000 new M1853 Enfield rifled muskets (still in their wooden crates) complete with ammunition. So the men of the 7th threw away their outdated weapons, took up the new Enfield muskets, and continued fighting. Later, still on the first day, Shaver's Brigade made an attack against the 24th Missouri Infantry Regiment (Union). During the battle of Pittsburgh Landing every officer on Shaver's staff was either killed or wounded. Colonel Shaver had four horses killed under him before he was critically wounded by an artillery shell on the second day of fighting. Lieutenant Colonel John M. Dean, who had field command of the 7th in place of Colonel Shaver, was killed during a charge at Shiloh. Lieutenant Colonel Dean led his men into battle at Shiloh with his musicians (drum and fife) playing the song "Granny does your Dog Bite?" Lt. Colonel Dean was mentioned in the afteraction reports for the gallantry that he and his men displayed at Shioh.

The regiment returned to Corinth after the Confederate repulse at Shiloh, where it rested and refitted and participated in the defense of that railroad junction from April to June, 1862. Upon Bragg's assumption of command of the Army of Mississippi, the army moved out again in a campaign intended to regain lost ground in Kentucky. In early May 1862, Confederate forces underwent an army-wide reorganization due to the passage of the Conscription Act by the Confederate Congress in April 1862. All twelve-month regiments had to re-muster and enlist for two additional years or the duration of the war; a new election of officers was ordered; and men who were exempted from service by age or other reasons under the Conscription Act were allowed to take a discharge and go home. Officers who did not choose to stand for re-election were also offered a discharge. The reorganization was accomplished among all the Arkansas regiments in and around Corinth, Mississippi, following the Battle of Shiloh. During its reorganization, Colonel Shaver, who had been wounded during the Battle of Shiloh, did not stand for re-election and Lieutenant D. A. Gillespie was elected Colonel.

=== Consolidation with the 6th Arkansas ===
During the Battle of Perryville, the 7th Arkansas Infantry Regiment took devastating casualties, leaving that regiment all but ineffective. The 6th Arkansas had also suffered heavy casualties in that same battle, so the 7th Arkansas' remaining soldiers were augmented into the 6th. The 6th and 7th Arkansas Infantry Regiments were combined December 22, 1862, and remained consolidated for the remainder of the war. The rolls of each company were, however, continued as though no consolidation had ever been made. After participating in the Kentucky Campaign, it was brigaded under Generals Liddell and Govan, Army of Tennessee.

From December 31, 1862, through January 2, 1863, the 6th and 7th Consolidated Arkansas Infantry Regiment was heavily engaged during the Battle of Murfreesboro, losing a total of 29 killed and 140 wounded. The unit was engaged in the Battle of Chickamauga and the Battles for Chattanooga. Colonel D. A. Gillespie was wounded at the Battle of Chickamauga and died in a hospital on October 26, 1862. The combined regiment had 16 disabled at the Battle of Ringgold Gap, totaled 314 men and 265 arms in December, 1863, and sustained 66 casualties at the Battle of Atlanta. The entire regiment was captured along with several other regiments during the Battle of Jonesboro, which was part of the Atlanta campaign, but were released several weeks later in a prisoner exchange. Returning to the Army of Tennessee, in time to participate in the Franklin-Nashville Campaign. After the retreat from Tennessee, the regiment was moved to North Carolina where they took part in the final charge of the army during the Battle of Bentonville.

=== Final consolidation and surrender ===
By the close of the war many of the Arkansas regiments assigned to the Army of Tennessee had suffered heavy casualties, so the 2nd, 5th, 6th, 7th, 8th, 13th, 15th, 19th, and 24th and the 3rd Confederate Infantry Regiments were consolidated into the 1st Arkansas Consolidated Infantry. According to the Muster rolls of the 1st Arkansas Consolidated, an attempt was made to maintain unit cohesion by allowing each of the original regiments to form one or two complete companies for the new unit. The following list indicates the regiment of origin for the companies of the 1st Arkansas Consolidated Infantry Regiment:

- Company A – 1st Arkansas Infantry.
- Company B – 2nd Arkansas Infantry.
- Company C – 5th Arkansas Infantry.
- Company D – 6th and 7th Arkansas Infantry.
- Company E – 8th Arkansas Infantry.
- Company F – 24th Arkansas Infantry.
- Company G – 13th Arkansas Infantry.
- Company H – 15th (Josey's) Arkansas Infantry.
- Company I – 19th (Dawsons's) Arkansas Infantry.
- Company K – 3rd Confederate Infantry.

Organized in Smithfield, North Carolina, the 1st Arkansas Consolidated was combat ready by April 9, 1865, the very day General Robert E. Lee surrendered the Army of Northern Virginia. The regiment was surrendered with the rest of the Army of Tennessee on April 26, 1865, in Durham Station, North Carolina.

== Battles ==
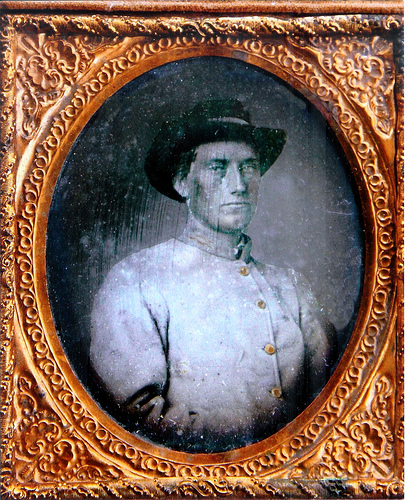
First Lieutenant Daniel W. Melton, Company B, 7th Arkansas Infantry Regiment

The 6th and 7th Arkansas Infantry Regiment actively took part in the following battles:

- Battle of Shiloh, Tennessee, April 6–7, 1862.
- Siege of Corinth, Mississippi, April–June 1862.
- Battle of Perryville, Kentucky, October 8, 1862.
- Battle of Murfreesboro, Tennessee, December 31, 1862 – January 3, 1863.
- Battle of Liberty Gap, Tennessee, June 24–26, 1863.
- Battle of Chickamauga, Georgia, September 19–20, 1863.
- Battle of Missionary Ridge, Tennessee, November 25, 1863.
- Battle of Ringgold Gap, Georgia, November 27, 1863.
- Battle of Rocky Face Ridge, Georgia, May 5–11, 1864.
- Battle of Resaca, Georgia, May 14–15, 1864.
- Battle of New Hope Church, Georgia, May 25 – June 4, 1864.
- Battle of Pickett's Mill, Georgina, May 27, 1864.
- Battle of Kennesaw Mountain, Georgia, June 27, 1864.
- Battle of Peachtree Creek, Georgia, July 20, 1864.
- Battle of Jonesboro, Georgia, August 31 – September 1, 1864.
- Battle of Spring Hill, Tennessee, November 29, 1864.
- Battle of Franklin, Tennessee, November 30, 1864.
- Battle of Nashville, Tennessee, December 15–16, 1864.
- Battle of Bentonville, North Carolina, March 19–21, 1865.

On April 9, 1865; ten depleted Arkansas regiments, including the 7th Arkansas, were consolidated to form the 1st Consolidated Arkansas Infantry Regiment.

== Regimental colors ==
At least three colors of the 6th and 7th Arkansas Infantry Regiment are known to exist.

National Color of the 6th and 7th Arkansas Infantry Regiment. currently in the Missouri State archives in Columbia, Missouri. When examined in 1978, it consisted of a 40 1/2" x 76 1/2" white bunting field with a red canton bearing an unedged 3 1/2" wide St. Andrew's cross bearing thirteen white cotton stars, those on the arms 3 1/2" across their points, the center 5" across its points, applied to the reverse and cut away on the obverse (reverse side accordingly 1/2" larger in diameter.) The white field bears the following inscriptions: (upper- in outline scrolls) "6th and 7th/ARK/REG'T" (middle) "God & Our Country"; (lower) "SHILOH. PERRYVILLE. MURFREESBORO.", all in red painted lettering. This flag dates no earlier than May 1863 and was probably a "parade" flag used briefly between May and June 1863, however no firm history survives regarding it.

Regimental Color of the 6th and 7th Arkansas Infantry Regiment. This is a 2nd pattern Hardee battle flag, originally of the 7th Arkansas, but modified for the combined 6th & 7th Arkansas; 30" x 37 1/4"; captured at Jonesboro, Georgia, on 1 September 1864 by Private Henry B. Mattingly, 10th Kentucky Infantry; War Department capture no. 531. This flag bears the embroidered battle honor "SHILOH" in the center of the elliptical disc, over embroidered "Down with the Tyrant", and with "7TH ARK." above it in paint, with "6TH &" added in front of it, both in black. Similarly, three battle honors, "PERRYVILLE." "MURFREESBORO." and "CHICKAMAUGA" painted in black on the white border. Also painted in white on blue field, "LIBERTY GAP", "RINGGOLD GAP", and "TUNNEL HILL, Tenn." This is the flag that the combined 6th and 7th Arkansas carried from their consolidation in November, 1862 until its loss in September 1864. This flag was captured, along with the regiment, when Govan's Arkansas Brigade was overrun and captured by a Federal charge on their position at Jonesboro, Georgia, on September 1, 1864. Private Henry B. Mattingly of Co. B, 10th Kentucky Infantry (Union) won the Medal of Honor for the capture of this flag. This flag is in the collection of the Old State House Museum in Little Rock, Arkansas. Dimensions: 28.5" x 37.5"; blue wool bunting, white cotton, silk embroidery, with blue, black, and white painted letters.

Regimental Color of the 6th and 7th Arkansas Infantry Regiment. This is a small (23 1/2" x 28 1/8") flag, most likely a camp color or flag marker, in the form of the 2nd pattern Hardee battle flag, with the Arkansas coat-of-arms painted on the elliptical disc and the designation "6TH and 7TH ARK. REG." painted on the upper border in black. It was acquired in 1976 by the National Park Service, and is on display at the Stone's River National Battlefield visitor center in Murfreesboro, TN. Dimensions: 28" x 38"; blue wool bunting, white cotton, with black painted letters.

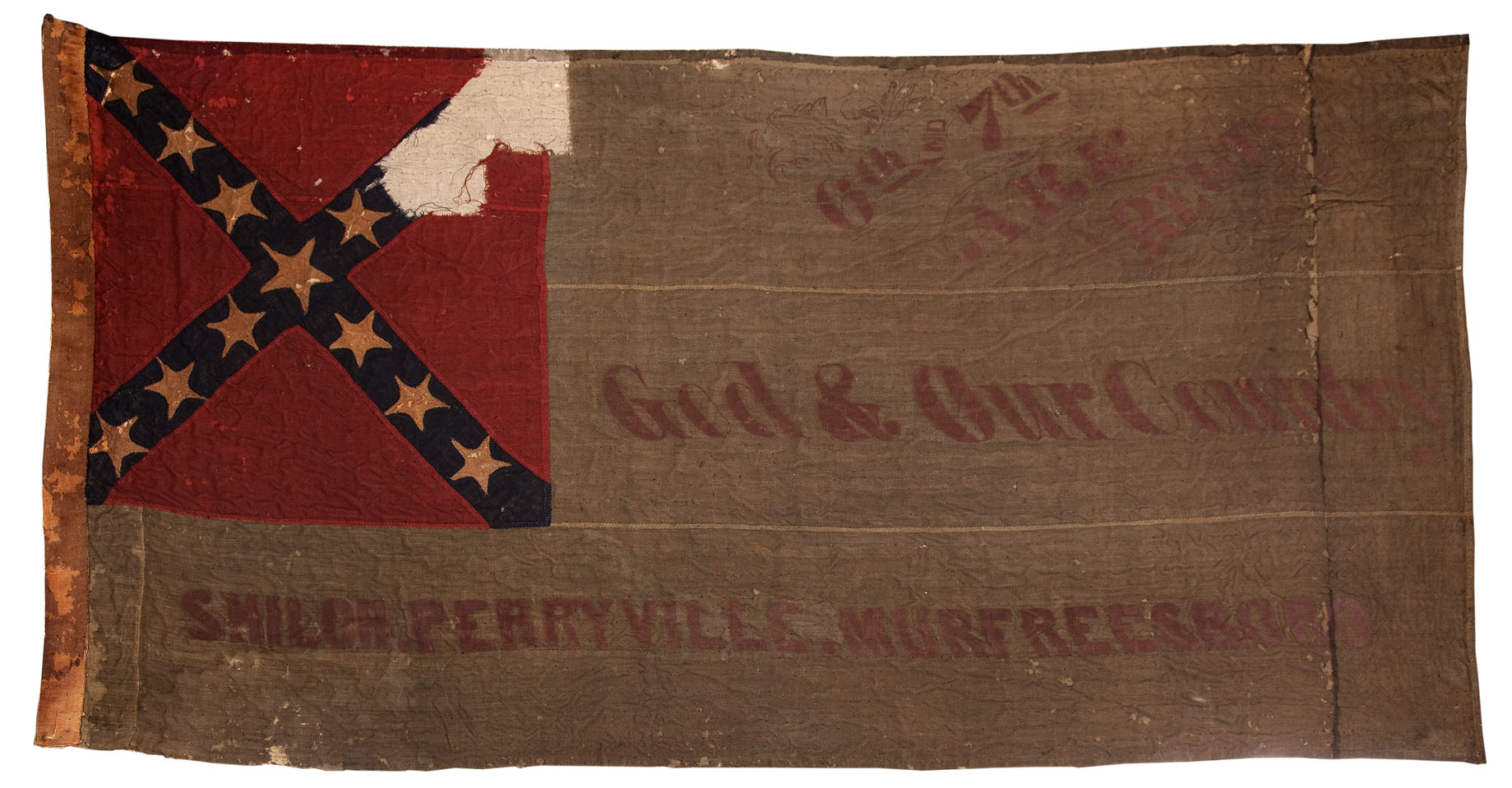
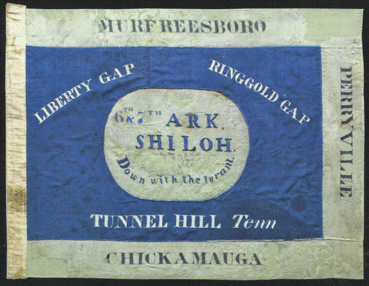
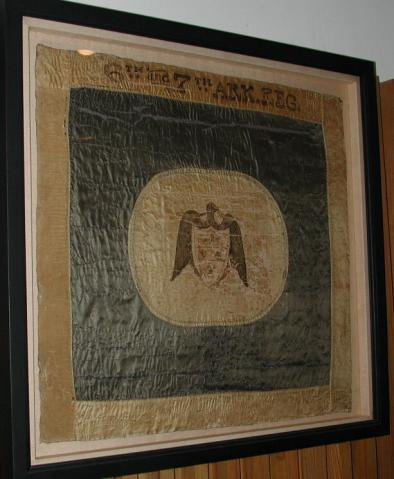
National Color of the 6th and 7th Arkansas	Regimental Color of the 6th and 7th Arkansas	Camp Color of the 6th and 7th Arkansas

== See also ==
- List of Confederate units from Arkansas
- Confederate Units by State

== Bibliography ==
- Allen, Desmond Walls. (1988). The Seventh Arkansas Confederate Infantry. Conway, AR: Arkansas Research. ISBN 0-941765-28-8.
