= 2nd Arkansas Infantry Regiment (Confederate) =

Army regiment of the Confederate Army during the American Civil War

- Active: 1861–1865
- Disbanded: April 26, 1865
- Country: Confederate States
- Allegiance: Arkansas
- Branch: Army
- Type: Infantry
- Size: Regiment
- Facings: Light blue
- Engagements: American Civil War: Battle of Rowlett's Station; Battle of Shiloh; Siege of Corinth; Kentucky Campaign; Battle of Perryville; Battle of Murfreesboro; Tullahoma Campaign; Battle of Liberty Gap; Chickamauga Campaign; Battle of Chickamauga; Chattanooga campaign; Battle of Missionary Ridge; Battle of Ringgold Gap; Atlanta campaign; Battle of Rocky Face Ridge; Battle of Resaca; Battle of New Hope Church; Battle of Kennesaw Mountain; Battle of Peachtree Creek; Siege of Atlanta; Battle of Jonesboro; Franklin–Nashville Campaign; Battle of Franklin; Battle of Nashville; Carolinas campaign; Battle of Bentonville
- Battle honours: Confederate Roll of Honor; Ten soldiers for the Battle of Murfreesboro

The 2nd Arkansas Infantry (June 1, 1861 – May 26, 1865) was an army regiment of the Confederate Army during the American Civil War. The regiment was raised in June 1861 under Colonel Thomas C. Hindman. It served throughout the war in the western theater, in the Confederate Army of Tennessee, seeing action in the Kentucky, Tennessee and Georgia campaigns. Following its depletion in numbers, the regiment was consolidated several times with other Arkansas regiments, finally merging in 1865 into the 1st Arkansas Consolidated Infantry Regiment. The regiment has no connection with the 2nd Regiment, Arkansas State Troops, which participated in the Battle of Wilson's Creek, and is also separate from the 2nd Arkansas Consolidated Infantry Regiment, which was formed in 1864 from remnants of regiments surrendered at Vicksburg and Port Hudson.

== Organization ==
The regiment was organized at Helena, Arkansas, in the summer of 1861 at the expense of Thomas Carmichael Hindman, who had only recently resigned from the United States Congress with Arkansas's secession and the formation of the Confederate States of America. Hindman demonstrated his aggressive and militant spirit early in life. By June 1, 1861, Hindman had raised ten companies from eastern and central Arkansas which would eventually become known as the 2nd Arkansas Infantry Regiment. The Second Arkansas Infantry, formed in June 1861 by Thomas Hindman, was notable for being privately funded by Hindman himself, who paid to clothe and feed the troops when state support failed. The state was responsible for providing the arms for the unit. Ten companies were raised by June 1, with six at Helena and four at Pine Bluff (Jefferson County). The companies were from Phillips, Jefferson, Bradley, and Saline counties.The regiment was composed primarily of men from the following counties:

- Company A – of Phillips County commanded by Captain T.C. Anderson:,
- Company B – of Phillips County, commanded by Captain John Kane.
- Company C (old) – of Phillips County.
- Company C – of Phillips County commanded by Captain John J. Foreman.
- Company C (new) – of Phillips County.
- Company D – of Phillips County, commanded by James E. Richards.
- Company E – of Phillips County.
- Company E (old) – of Phillips County, commanded by Barton Y. Truner.
- Company E (new) – of Transfers from 11th Arkansas Infantry.
- Company F – of Phillips County, originally commanded by Daniel C. Govan, later commanded by Captain Richard S. Boyd.
- Company G – of Bradley County, commanded by Captain William D. Mackey.
- Company H – the "Southern Guards", of Jefferson County, commanded by Captain Joseph W. Bocage. This company was originally organized on December 18, 1860, as a volunteer company in the 24th Regiment, Arkansas State Militia.
- Company I – of Bradley County, commanded by W.J. McKinney.
- Company K – of Saline County, commanded by Captain M.D Brown.

Colonel Hindman asked the state to provide muskets, clothing and ten days rations so his men could "fight for our country." Hindman also asked to be ordered to march to Virginia. His requests were not complied with, so he stopped steamers loaded with sugar for Cincinnati and Pittsburgh, and sold their cargo. He then purchased all the arms available and took his command to Memphis. Other organizations joined him: Lieutenant Colonel John S. Marmaduke's battalion of eight companies, which would eventually become 3rd Confederate Infantry; 6th (Phifer's) Arkansas Cavalry Battalion, under Major Charles W. Phifer, and Captain Swett's Mississippi battery of four guns. This combined force, known temporarily as "Hindman's Legion", was ultimately ordered to assemble with the other Arkansas troops assembling at Pocahontas, where they were mustered into Confederate service by companies between May 26 and June 26, 1861, and assigned to Hardee's Division.

The regiment was commanded by Colonels Thomas C. Hindman, Lieutenant Colonel Joseph W. Bocage, Colonel Daniel C. Govan, Lieutenant Colonel J. W. Scaife, and E. Warfield; Lieutenant Colonels Jos. W. Bocage, E. G. Brasher, R. F. Harvey, and Charles Patterson; and Major A. T. Meek.

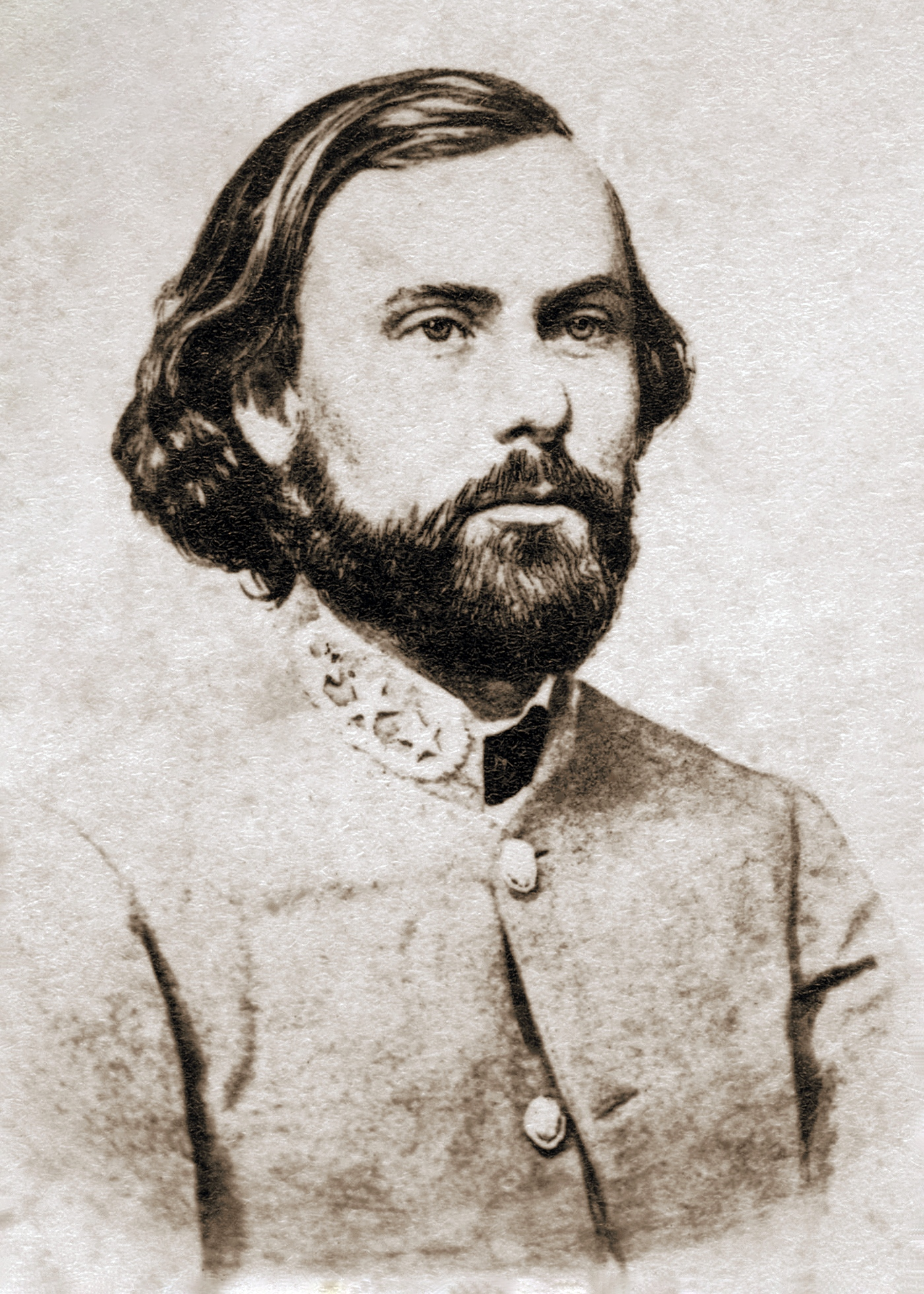
Colonel Thomas C. Hindman

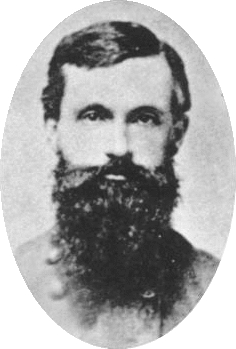
Daniel Chevilette Govan, began his service by raising a Volunteer Company in Phillips County, Arkansas, he would eventually command a brigade under General Patrick Cleburne, Army of Tennessee

Two of the regiment's officers, Thomas C. Hindman and Daniel C. Govan, were promoted to general.Thomas Carmichael Hindman was a prominent attorney and Democratic politician prior to the Civil War. Hindman would later be wounded in action and receive a promotion to major general, ending the war as Arkansas' highest-ranking officer.

== Battles ==
The unit moved from Pittman's Ferry in northeast Arkansas to Kentucky. In October 1861, General Albert Sidney Johnston assumed command of Army of Central Kentucky, and Brigadier General Hardee was promoted to major general and given command of a division, which included the 2nd Arkansas. Colonel Hindman was reassigned to brigade command. When Hindman was promoted to brigadier general on September 28, 1861, and the command of the regiment fell to Lieutenant Colonel Bocage. Lieutenant Colonel Bocage resigned on November 23, 1861. The unit was involved in an engaged at Rowlett's Station, Kentucky, on December 17, 1861.

After the losses of Fort Henry and Fort Donelson in February 1862, Confederate General Albert Sidney Johnston withdrew his forces into western Tennessee, northern Mississippi, and Alabama to reorganize. On March 29, 1862, the Army of Central Kentucky was merged into the Army of Mississippi in preparation for the Battle of Shiloh.

Assigned to Hindman's (later Liddell's) brigade, Army of Mississippi in March, 1862 where it participated in the Battle of Shiloh on April 6–7, 1862 and in the Corinth Campaign from April through June of that year. As a result of losses in the Battle of Shiloh, Companies C and E were disbanded and consolidated with other companies. A new Company C was recruited from Marianna, Arkansas and a new Company E was formed from members of the 11th Arkansas Infantry Regiment who had escaped capture at the fall of Island Number Ten.

In early May 1862 the Confederate forces underwent an army-wide reorganization due to the passage of the Conscription Act by the Confederate Congress in April 1862. All twelve-month regiments had to re-muster and enlist for two additional years or the duration of the war; a new election of officers was ordered; and men who were exempted from service by age or other reasons under the Conscription Act were allowed to take a discharge and go home. Officers who did not choose to stand for re-election were also offered a discharge. The reorganization was accomplished among all the Arkansas regiments in and around Corinth, Mississippi, following the Battle of Shiloh.

In the reorganization of Confederate forces before the start of the Kentucky Campaign, the 2nd Arkansas, now under the command of Colonel Daniel C. Govan was assigned to Brigadier General St. John Richardson Liddell's 1st Brigade of Major General Simon Bolivar Buckner's 3rd Division of Major General William Joseph Hardee's Corps of the Army of Mississippi. The regiment participated in Battle of Perryville, Kentucky, in October 1862.

In November 1862, following the Kentucky Campaign, General Bragg united his Army of Mississippi and General Kirby Smith'sArmy of Kentucky to create the Army of Tennessee. In the reorganization, Liddell's brigade of Arkansas troops was assigned to Cleburne's Division and fought in the Battle of Stones River, December 31, 1862 – January 3, 1863. The regiment lost 15 killed, 94 wounded, and 9 missing at Murfreesboro.

The regiment took part in the Tullahoma Campaign in June, 1863; and the Battle of Liberty Gap, June 24–26, 1863. According to the report Brigadier General St. John R. Liddell, the regiment lost its colors during the fighting at Liberty Gap.

.. . I had previously ordered up the Sixth and Seventh Arkansas Regiments (which were held in reserve) to the support of the Second, where Colonel Govan informed me that his ammunition was nearly exhausted. I instructed him to try to hold his place until I could get the reserve into position and the ammunition of this regiment could be brought up. There was some difficulty, however, in getting the ammunition, on account of the boggy nature of the ground, caused by so much rain.

Meanwhile the Sixth and Seventh had become hotly engaged. Two color-bearers of the Second [Arkansas] were killed, and the third, standing on the declivity of the hill, was fatally struck, and falling forward headlong, cast his colors toward the base, in close proximity to the line of the enemy. The colors were not missed until the regiment had retired over the crest of the hill, and having now no ammunition, it was useless to renew the attack for their recovery. This is a source of great mortification to the regiment as well as the brigade.. . .

The Thirty-eighth Illinois captured the colors of the Second Arkansas Infantry, and were given credit for breaking the Confederate line and forcing their retreat.

In September 1863, the 2nd was consolidated with the 15th Arkansas, and the consolidated regiment participated in the Battle of Chickamauga, September 19–20, 1863.

In December 1863, the 24th Arkansas Infantry was added to the consolidated 2nd/15th Arkansas and the 2nd/15th/24th totaled 295 men and 202 arms in December 1863. On December 29, 1863, Colonel Daniel Govan of the 2nd Arkansas was promoted to the rank of brigadier general. The consolidated unit participated in all the battles of the Chattanooga-Ringgold Campaign including the Siege of Chattanooga September to November 1863; Battle of Chattanooga, the Battle of Ringgold Gap.

When General Joseph E. Johnston assumed command of the Army of Tennessee to oppose General Sherman's Atlanta campaign, Govan's Brigade was reorganized and only the 2nd and 24th were united. The 2nd/24th Arkansas participated in the battles of Dalton, Resaca, New Hope Church, Kennesaw Mountain, Atlanta, and the Siege of Atlanta. The consolidated 2nd/24th Arkansas reported 130 casualties during the campaign.

The regiment and it colors were captured, along with much of Govan's Brigade at the Battle of Jonesboro, Georgia, on Sept. 1, 1864. Due to a special cartel between Union General Sherman and Confederate General John B. Hood, the unit was quickly paroled and exchanged for Union prisoners held at Andersonville Prison. The regiment re-entered service approximately a month later.

The 2nd Arkansas and the rest of Govan's Brigade were released and exchanged just in time to participate in General John B. Hood's disastrous Franklin-Nashville Campaign. Due to the appalling losses suffered by Govan's Brigade during the Atlanta Campaign, the 1st/15th, 5th/13th and 2nd/24th Arkansas Regiments were consolidated into one regiment, which was commanded by Colonel Peter Green of the 5th/13th (specifically of the 5th). The other officers of the consolidated regiment were Major Alexander T. Meek, of the 2nd/24th Arkansas, Captain Mordecai P. Garrett and Sergeant Major Thomas Benton Moncrief of the 15th Arkansas. The consolidated regiment fought under the colors of the consolidated 5th/13th Arkansas Regiment, because this was one of the only colors not captured when Govan's Brigade was overrun at the Battle of Jonesboro. The flag of the combined 5th/13th Arkansas was issued in March 1864 and was captured by Benjamin Newman of the 88th Illinois Infantry at the battle of Franklin. The consolidated regiment numbered just 300 rifles and sustained 66% casualties during the Battle of Franklin.

The remnants of Govan's Brigade that survived the Tennessee Campaign remained with the Army of Tennessee through its final engagements in the 1865 Carolinas campaign. The 2nd Arkansas Infantry took part in the following engagements:

  - Battle of Rowlett's Station, Kentucky, December 17, 1861.
  - Battle of Shiloh, Tennessee, April 6–7, 1862.
  - Siege of Corinth, April to June 1862.
  - Kentucky Campaign, Kentucky, August–October, 1862.
    - Battle of Perryville, Kentucky, October 8, 1862.
  - Battle of Murfreesboro, Tennessee, December 31, 1862, to January 3, 1863.
  - Tullahoma Campaign, June 1863.
    - Battle of Liberty Gap, Tennessee, June 24–26, 1863.
  - Chickamauga Campaign, Georgia, August–September, 1863.
    - Battle of Chickamauga, Georgia, September 19–20, 1863.
  - Chattanooga campaign, September to November 1863.
    - Battle of Missionary Ridge, Tennessee, November 25, 1863.
    - Battle of Ringgold Gap, Georgia, November 27, 1863.
  - Atlanta campaign, May to September 1864.
    - Battle of Rocky Face Ridge, Georgia, May 5–11, 1864.
    - Battle of Resaca, Georgia, May 14–15, 1864.
    - Battle of New Hope Church, Georgia, May 25–June 4, 1864.
    - Battle of Kennesaw Mountain, Georgia, June 27, 1864.
    - Battle of Peachtree Creek, Georgia, July 20, 1864.
    - Siege of Atlanta, Georgia, July 22, 1864.
    - Battle of Jonesboro, Georgia, August 31–September 1, 1864.
  - Franklin–Nashville Campaign, Alabama, Georgia and Tennessee, September 18–December 27, 1864.
    - Battle of Spring Hill, Tennessee, November 29, 1864.
    - Battle of Franklin, Tennessee, November 30, 1864.
    - Battle of Nashville, Tennessee, December 15–16, 1864.
  - Carolinas campaign, February–April 1865.
    - Battle of Bentonville, North Carolina, March 19–21, 1865.

== Consolidation and surrender ==
On April 9, 1865, the remnants of ten depleted Arkansas regiments in the Army of Tennessee, along with one mostly Arkansas regiment, were consolidated to form a single regiment at Smithfield, North Carolina. The 1st Arkansas was combined with the 2nd, 5th, 6th, 7th, 8th, 15th, 19th and 24th Arkansas Infantry Regiments and the 3rd Confederate Infantry Regiment as the 1st Arkansas Consolidated Infantry on April 9, 1865. On April 26, 1865, the 1st Arkansas Consolidated Infantry Regiment was present with the Army of Tennessee when it surrendered in Greensboro, North Carolina.

== See also ==
- List of Confederate units from Arkansas
- Confederate Units by State
