= 19th and 24th Consolidated Arkansas Infantry Regiment =

19th (Hardy's) Arkansas Infantry (Confederate)
- Active: 1863–1865
- Disbanded: May 26, 1865
- Country: Confederate States of America
- Allegiance: Arkansas
- Branch: Confederate States Army
- Type: Infantry
- Size: Regiment
- Engagements: American Civil War: Little Rock Campaign; Red River Campaign; Battle of Pleasant Hill; Battle of Jenkins Ferry

The 19th and 24th Consolidated Arkansas Infantry Regiment (1863–1865) was a Confederate Army infantry regiment during the American Civil War. The unit was assembled from the portions of Dawson's 19th Arkansas Infantry Regiment and the 24th Arkansas Infantry Regiment, that were not present when the garrison of Arkansas Post surrendered. The unit is most often referred to as Hardy's Arkansas Infantry Regiment, but by the late stages of the war, the unit was simply referred to simply as Hardy's 19th Arkansas Infantry Regiment. The portions of the 19th Arkansas and the 24th Arkansas which did surrender with the garrison of Arkansas Post were ultimately released east of the Mississippi River and were also briefly designated as the 19th and 24th Consolidated Arkansas Infantry Regiment, in Govan's Brigade of the Army of Tennessee, but that consolidation ended after the Battle of Chickamauga. The 19th and 24th Consolidated Arkansas Infantry Regiment served in the Department of the Trans-Mississippi from its formation in February 1863 until the close of the war.

== Organization ==
Hardy's Regiment was organized around February 1863 by consolidating the portions of the 19th (Dawson's) and 24th Arkansas and Crawford's Arkansas Infantry Battalion that were not captured at the Battle of Arkansas Post on January 11, 1863. Detachments from these organizations were on duty at other locations the time Union force began the attack on Fort Hindman at Arkansas Post.

It would seem at the time of the attack on Arkansas Post the 24th Arkansas Infantry Regiment and Crawford's Arkansas Infantry Battalion were stationed at St. Charles preparing to place two 8inch 32-pounder smooth bore columbiad guns from the CSS Ponchartrain in battery there. When the news of the battle at Arkansas Post reached them, Colonel Portlock and approximately 147 men from the two units made a forced march from St. Charles to Arkansas Post but arrived just in time to be surrendered with the garrison.

Those left at St. Charles, about 200 men from the 24th and Crawford's Battalion loaded the two 8inch columbiads onto the steamboat Bluewing, moved them up the White River to DeVal's Bluff and loaded them onto railroad flatcars to be shipped back to Little Rock. However, the Federal Gunboats arrived before the train could leave and the guns were captured. The men had made their escape into the woods except for those who were in the hospital at DeVal's Bluff, who were paroled.

This detachment of approximately 200 men from the 24th Arkansas and Crawford's Battalion returned to Camp White Sulphur Springs, near Pine Bluff, where they and other members of the 24th, Dawson's 19th (including Colonel Dawson himself) and Crawford's battalion, who happened to be in the hospitals at Sulphur Springs, St Charles and Deval's Bluff at the time of the Battle of Arkansas Post, were organized into a "holding regiment" under Colonel Charles Dawson's command. The original thought was that the men would remain in this holding regiment until the captured portions of these commands were exchanged and returned to Arkansas to reform these regiments. General U. S. Grant however didn't want those men captured at Arkansas Post to be exchanged back in the Mississippi River theater of operations to oppose his operations against Vicksburg, Hence they were exchanged at City Point, Virginia instead of the normal exchange point for Trans-Mississippi prisoners at Vicksburg. This left portions of the regiments in Arkansas, and portions in Virginia.

Those elements of the 19th, 24th and Crawford's Arkansas Infantry Battalion which not present to surrender with the garrison of Arkansas Post, were eventually consolidated in a regiment under command of Colonel Charles L. Dawson, originally from the 19th Arkansas, and assisted by Lieutenant Colonel William R. Hardy and Major Francis H. Wood of the 24th Arkansas Infantry Regiment. The companies of the regiment were reorganized from the remnants of the 19th and 24th Arkansas Infantry Regiments and Crawford's Battalion in the following manner:

- Company A – composed of Companies A & B, Crawford's Battalion.
- Company B – composed of Companies B & E, 24th Arkansas Infantry.
- Company C – composed of Companies D, 24th Arkansas Infantry.
- Company D – composed of Companies F, 24th Arkansas Infantry.
- Company E – composed of Companies H, 24th Arkansas Infantry.
- Company F – composed of Companies C & G, 24th Arkansas Infantry.
- Company G – composed of Companies B & C, 19th Arkansas Infantry.
- Company H – composed of Companies A & K, 24th Arkansas Infantry.
- Company I – composed of Companies F, G & I, 19th Arkansas Infantry.
- Company K – composed of Companies D, E & K, 19th Arkansas Infantry.
- Captain Torbett's Company, composed of Companies A & H, 19th Arkansas Infantry; and Co. I, 24th Arkansas Infantry.

== Service ==
=== Little Rock Campaign ===
The Consolidated Regiment remained at White Sulphur Springs until late July 1863 training and as part of the lower Arkansas River Valley defenses. Initially assigned in an unattached status to Frost's Brigade in southeastern Arkansas in May and June 1863. Daniel Frost took command of the "defenses of the Lower Arkansas River" with the departure of Major General John Walkers Division to Louisiana in late April 1863. Colonel John Clark assumed command of Frost's old brigade and Fort Pleasant. The 19th/24th Consolidated moved with Colonel John Clark's Missouri Brigade of Frost's Missouri Division from Fort Pleasant to the defenses of Little Rock in August 1863. On August 15, 1865, the unit was marched through Little Rock, and entrenched on the north side of the Arkansas River. The unit retreated from Little Rock without becoming engaged in the Battle of Bayou Fourche.

=== Red River Campaign ===
During the winter of 1863–64, the regiment was reassigned to Tappan's Brigade. Under the command of Lieutenant Colonel Hardy, the regiment participated in the Red River Campaign with Tappan's Brigade.

In the Spring of 1864, the Churchill's Division, with Tappan's Brigade moved south to oppose Union General Nathaniel Banks' Red River Campaign in north-central Louisiana in March and early April 1864. The division arrived during the Battle of Mansfield on April 8, 1864, but was not committed to the battle and occupied a position on the flank of General Taylor's division. Brigadier General Churchill was placed in command of both his own division and Brigadier General Parson's Division during the pursuit of the enemy from Mansfield to Pleasant Hill, Louisiana so Brigadier General Tappan assumed command of Churchill's Division. While Tappan commanded the Division, Colonel Grinstead of the 33rd Arkansas assumed command of Tappan's Brigade and led it through the fight at Pleasant Hill, on April 9, 1864. General Tappan described the action at Pleasant Hill as follows:

My line was formed at about 4:30 o'clock. . . . I threw out three companies of skirmishers under Major Steele of Grinsted's regiment, and immediately ordered my line to advance rapidly as directed. . . . For an hour and a half we were as warmly engaged with the enemy as it has ever been my experience to witness on any battlefield. My division, however, never faltered, but moved steadily forward, with the valor of men determined to succeed or fall in the attempt. . . . At this juncture, learning that the division on the right had been outflanked and was falling back, I immediately directed my attention in that direction and saw that such was the case. When said division had swept entirely past mine, and my command became exposed to a heavy and murderous fire from the flank as well as from the front, I ordered the brigade commanders to fall back with a view of forming a line in a more advantageous position. . . . The exhausted condition of the men, the lateness of the hour (it being near dark), and the denseness of the thicket made it extremely difficult to rally the men. While the battle lasted no men ever fought more gallantly. This is evidenced by the fact that the enemy made little or no attempt to pursue our line; on the contrary, he fled toward Red river as soon as night came, leaving his dead to be buried and his wounded to be cared by us. The loss of the division in the engagement was as follows: Killed, 26; wounded, 112; missing, 63.

Churchill's Division marched back north into Arkansas to deal with the other part of the Federal advance, General Frederick Steele's Camden Expedition. The division arrived after a long forced march at Woodlawn, Arkansas on April 26, where they rested overnight, then joined the pursuit of Steele's retreating army, catching it trying to cross the Saline River near Jenkins' Ferry on April 30, 1864. The 19th/24th suffered a total of 8 killed and 18 wounded in the Battle of Jenkins' Ferry.

=== Final Year of the war ===
On 1 September 1864, Brigadier General James C. Tappan reported that Colonel Hardy's regiment was assigned to Tappan's Brigade. On the same day Brigadier General Tappan reported that the assigned strength of Hardy's Regiment 19th Arkansas Infantry Regiment (Hardy's) and Thompson's Regiment was 787 men, of which only 373 were armed.

On 30 September 1864, General Kirby Smith's report on the organization of the Army of the Trans-Mississippi lists the 19th Arkansas, under the command of Colonel Hardy in Brigadier General James C. Tappan's, 3rd Brigade of Acting Major General Thomas J. Churchill's 1st Arkansas Infantry Division of Major General John B. Magruder's 2nd Army Corps. On 17 November 1864, a union spy reported that the Tampan's Brigade and Churchill's Division was in the vicinity of Camden, in Ouachita County, Arkansas.

On 31 December 1864, General Kirby Smith's report on the organization of his forces lists the 19th Arkansas, under the command of Colonel Hardy as belonging to Brigadier General James C. Tappan's, 3rd Brigade of Acting Major General Thomas J. Churchill's 1st Arkansas Infantry Division of Major General John B. Magruder's 2nd Army Corps, Confederate Army of the Trans-Mississippi.

On 22 January 1865, Major General Churchill was ordered to move his division to Minden, Louisiana, and occupy winter quarters. Union commanders in the Department of the Gulf reported on March 20, 1865, that General Tappan's brigade minus Shaver's regiment, was located a Minden, Louisiana, with the rest of Churchill's Division. In early April 1865, the division concentrated near Shreaveport Louisiana, and then moved to Marshall Texas by mid April 1865.

=== Campaign Credit ===
The unit participated in the following engagements.

- Red River Campaign, Arkansas March–May, 1864
  - Battle of Pleasant Hill, Louisiana April 9, 1864
  - Battle of Jenkins Ferry, Arkansas April 30, 1864

== Surrender ==
This regiment was surrendered with the Department of the Trans-Mississippi, General Kirby Smith commanding, May 26, 1865. When the Trans-Mississippi Department surrendered, all of the Arkansas infantry regiments were encamped in and around Marshall, Texas (war-ravaged Arkansas no longer able to subsist the army). The regiments were ordered to report to Shreveport, Louisiana, to be paroled. None of them did so. Some soldiers went to Shreveport on their own to be paroled, but the regiments simply disbanded without formally surrendering. A company or two managed to keep together until they got home, but for the most part, the men simply went home.

== See also ==
- List of Confederate units from Arkansas
- Confederate Units by State
