= 15th Arkansas Infantry Regiment (Josey's) =

Infantry regiment of the Confederate States Army

- Active: 1861–1865
- Disbanded: April 26, 1865
- Country: Confederate States
- Allegiance: Arkansas
- Branch: Army
- Type: Infantry
- Size: Regiment
- Nicknames: "Josey's regiment"; "Polk's regiment"; "Cleburne's regiment"
- Facings: Light blue
- Arms: Enfield rifled muskets
- Battles: American Civil War; Battle of Shiloh; First Battle of Corinth; Battle of Richmond; Battle of Perryville; Battle of Murfreesboro; Battle of Liberty Gap; Battle of Chickamauga; Battle of Missionary Ridge; Battle of Ringgold Gap; Battle of Rocky Face Ridge; Battle of Resaca; Battle of New Hope Church; Battle of Pickett's Mill; Battle of Kennesaw Mountain; Battle of Atlanta; Siege of Atlanta; Battle of Jonesboro; Battle of Franklin; Battle of Nashville; Battle of Bentonville

The 15th Arkansas Infantry Regiment or Josey's Arkansas Infantry Regiment (also known as "Polk's regiment" or "Cleburne's regiment") was an infantry formation in the Confederate States Army during the American Civil War. The regiment was organized in May 1861 under the command of Colonel Patrick Cleburne. It served throughout the war in the western theater, seeing action in the Kentucky, Tennessee, and Georgia campaigns. Following its depletion in numbers the regiment was consolidated several times with other Arkansas regiments, finally merging in 1865 into the 1st Arkansas Consolidated Infantry Regiment. There were two other regiments which also received the designation of "15th Arkansas". The 21st (McRae's) Arkansas Infantry was redesignated 15th Arkansas in February 1863, but to avoid confusion, was normally referred to as the "Northwest regiment". This second "15th Arkansas" was surrendered at Vicksburg in July 1863. A third regiment, under command of Colonels Gee and later Johnson, also received the designation 15th Arkansas Infantry. This last regiment surrendered at Port Hudson, Louisiana, in July 1863.

== Organization ==
The 1st Regiment, Arkansas State Troops, was organized mainly from existing volunteer militia companies several of which had participated in the seizure of the Federal Arsenal at Little Rock.

=== Organized from State Militia Units ===
Ten Volunteer Companies were enrolled in State service on May 14, 1861, at Camp Rector, near Mound City, 6 miles (9.7 km) above Memphis on the Mississippi River. Seven of the original ten companies had initially been organized under the state militia laws. Captain Patrick R. Cleburne, of the Yell Rifles, was elected Colonel of the regiment. As the very first regiment of the line authorized by the Arkansas State Military Board in the Civil War, they bore the title of 1st Regiment, Arkansas State Troops. The regiment was formally organized with the following Volunteer Companies:

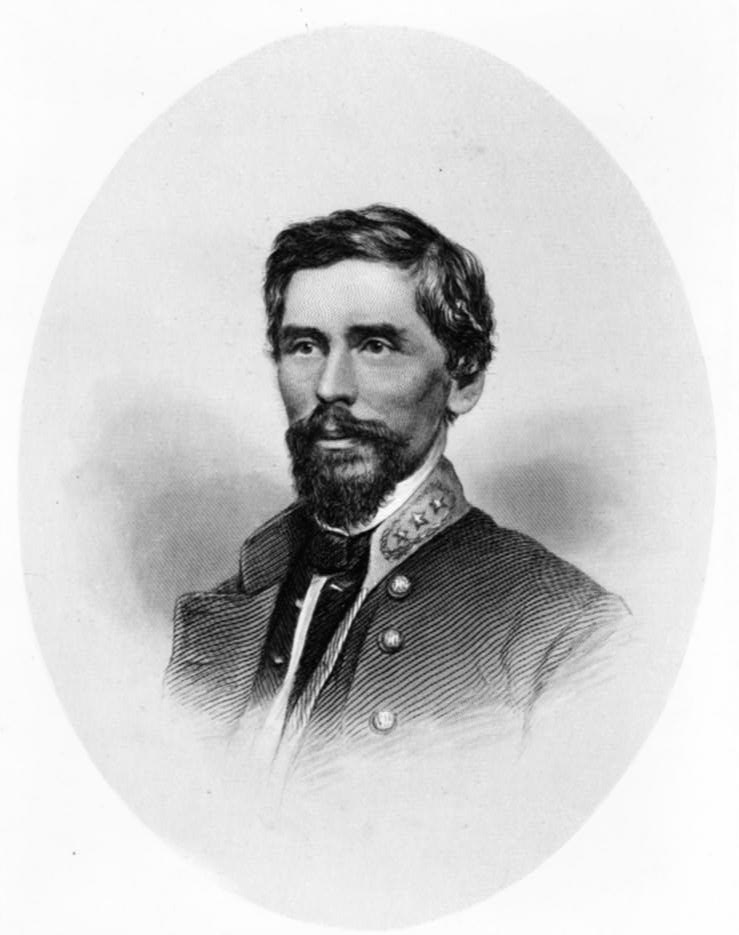
Colonel Patrick Cleburne, Commander, 15th Arkansas Volunteer Infantry

Company	Name	County	Militia Regiment	Commander	Organization Date
Company A	"Harris Guards"	Monroe	35th Militia Regiment	Capt. James T. Harris	May 27, 1861
Company B	"Jefferson Guards"	Jefferson	24th Militia Regiment	Capt. Charles H. Carlton	September 24, 1860
Company C	"Yell Guards"	Jefferson	None	Capt. Francis M. McNally	
Company D	"Rector Guards"	Prairie	50th Militia Regiment	Capt. George W. Glenn	February 12, 1861
Company E	"Napoleon Grays"	Desha	6th Militia Regiment	Capt. Henry E. Green	February 28, 1861
Company F	"Yell Riflemen"	Phillips	12th Militia Regiment	Capt. Patrick R. Cleburne	January 29, 1861
Company G	"Hindman Guards"	White	None	Capt. Henry B. Blakemore	April 18, 1861
Company H	"Phillips Guards"	Phillips	12th Militia Regiment	Capt. George Otey	September 17, 1860
Company I	"Tyronza Rebels"	Mississippi	None	Capt. Robert L. Harding	June 3, 1861
Company K	"Monroe Blues"	Monroe	35th Militia Regiment	Capt. Gaston K. Baldwin	May 16, 1861

When Captain Cleburne was appointed colonel of the new regiment, Captain Edward H. Cowley was elected to succeed him in command of the Yell Rifles, Company F.

=== Transferred to Confederate Service ===
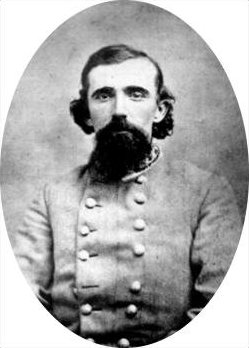
Colonel, Later Brigadier General Lucius E. Polk

The regiment moved via steamboat from Camp Rector down the Mississippi and back up the White River to Pocahontas, Arkansas, where they were sworn into Confederate service. Under the command of Colonel Patrick Cleburne, the unit was transferred from state service to Confederate service on July 23, 1861, at Pitman's Ferry, AR and was initially designated as the 1st Arkansas Infantry; This transfer was not binding on the men, who could opt out if they so desired. The men of Company C (Yell Guards) and Company G (Hindman Guards) declined to transfer to the Provisional Army of the Confederate States, so the men were honorably discharged and their companies were disbanded.

After July 1861, the 1st/15th Arkansas had only eight companies, making it, in effect, a "heavy" battalion, rather than a full regiment, but the unit was kept on the army rolls as a regiment throughout the war. The following companies were transferred into Confederate Service:

- Company A – Harris Guards.
- Company B – Yell Rifles.
- Company C – Napoleon Grays.
- Company D – Tyronza Rebels.
- Company E – Monroe Blues.
- Company F – Phillips Guards.
- Company G – Rector Guards.
- Company H – Jefferson Guards.

=== Re-designated as the 15th Arkansas Infantry Regiment ===
The Regiment conducted its initial training at Pitman's Ferry and was assigned to a division commanded by Confederate General William Hardee's Division. They made a short excursion or raid into southeast Missouri in September, and in October, moved with the rest of Hardee's command across the river into Kentucky, becoming Hardee's Division, Army of Central Kentucky. At the time the regiment was moved across the Mississippi River, it contained 506 men. By January 1862 the Confederate War Department had discovered that there was already a "1st Arkansas Infantry" enrolled in Confederate service. Col James Fleming Fagan's regiment was accepted and enrolled in the Provisional Army of the Confederate States at Lynchburg, Virginia, on May 19, 1861, as the 1st Regiment Arkansas Volunteers. When the Confederate War Department realized that it had two "First Arkansas" regiments, it arbitrarily assigned what their records showed was the next available designation, "the 15th Arkansas Regiment" and ordered Cleburne's regiment to adopt this designation. The regiment was redesignated as the 15th Arkansas Infantry on December 31, 1861. Unfortunately the Arkansas State Military Board had already authorized the use of this designation for Col. James M. Gee's regiment. Effectively the Confederate Army went from having two 1st Arkansas Regiments to having two 15th Arkansas Regiments; however, these designations stuck for the rest of the war. Thus, by January 1862 Cleburne's 1st Arkansas Regiment was reorganized for the war as the 15th Arkansas Regiment, as follows:

Colonel John E. Josey

- Company A – Harris Guards.
- Company B – Jefferson Guards.
- Company C – Yell Rifles.
- Company D – Napoleon Grays.
- Company E – Tyronza Rebels.
- Company F – Monroe Blues.
- Company G – Phillips Guards.
- Company H – Rector Guards.

=== Commanders ===
Colonel Cleburne was appointed Brigadier General in March 1862, and was succeeded by Lieutenant Colonel Archibald K. Patton. After the battle of Shiloh, Colonel Lucius E. Polk took command. Colonel Polk was appointed Brigadier General in December 1862, and was succeeded by Colonel John E. Josey. The U.S. War Department cataloged the regiment's Compiled Service Records as the 15th (Josey's) Arkansas Infantry.

== Battles ==
General Hardee took the 7th Arkansas Battalion with him when he transferred his command to Kentucky and organized the Confederate Army of Central Kentucky and Colonel Cleburne was placed in command of a new brigade which included his 15th Arkansas, the 6th Mississippi, and the 23rd, 24th and 35th Tennessee Regiments. After the losses of Fort Henry and Fort Donelson in February 1862, Confederate General Albert Sidney Johnston withdrew his forces into western Tennessee, northern Mississippi, and Alabama to reorganize. and then retreated through western Tennessee to northern Mississippi. On March 29, 1862, the Army of Central Kentucky was merged into the Army of Mississippi in preparation for the Battle of Shiloh. Under the command of Lieutenant Colonel Archibald K. Patton, the 15th Arkansas saw its first combat at the Battle of Shiloh, April 6–7, 1862, where it suffered heavy casualties in driving back Sherman's division of Union troops.

In early May 1862 the Confederate forces underwent an army-wide reorganization due to the passage of the Conscription Act by the Confederate Congress in April 1862. All twelve-month regiments had to re-muster and enlist for two additional years or the duration of the war; a new election of officers was ordered; and men who were exempted from service by age or other reasons under the Conscription Act were allowed to take a discharge and go home. Officers who did not choose to stand for re-election were also offered a discharge. The reorganization was accomplished among all the Arkansas regiments in and around Corinth, Mississippi, following the Battle of Shiloh.

After reorganizing at Corinth, the regiment participated with Cleburne's Brigade in the Confederate Army of the Mississippi during the Battles of Richmond and Perryville, Kentucky, in October 1862. Due to heavy losses suffered by the 13th Arkansas during the Battle of Shiloh, the 13th and the 15th Arkansas were consolidated during the Kentucky Campaign. The consolidated regiment was commanded by Colonel Lucius Eugene Polk of the 15th Arkansas. The regiment lost 2 killed and 19 wounded at the Battle of Richmond, Kentucky. When the Army of Mississippi was reorganized and redesignated the Army of Tennessee, the regiment was assigned to first Polk's then Liddell's and finally to Govan's Brigade, Army of Tennessee. During the Battle of Murfreesboro the 13th/15th Arkansas was further consolidated with the 1st Arkansas Infantry Regiment and the consolidated regiment was commanded by Colonel John W. Colquitt. The 13th/15th reported 68 casualties at Murfreesborough.

In September 1863 the 15th was field consolidated with the 2nd Arkansas Infantry Regiment and during December 1863 the 24th Arkansas Infantry Regiment was added to the field consolidation. During December, 1863, the 2nd/15th/24th totaled 295 men and 202 arms. The unit served with the army from the Battle of Chickamauga and the Battles for Chattanooga, and throughout the Atlanta campaign.

In July, 1864, the 15th Arkansas was field consolidated with the Fagan's 1st Arkansas Infantry. During the Battle of Kennesay Mountain the 1st/15th became involved in a famous humanitarian act. At one point in the battle on June 27, not far from the position known as the "Dead Angle", the Union frontal assault had failed leaving hundreds of dead and wounded Union soldiers between the Confederate works and the Union lines. The woods and brush between the two armies caught fire because of the gun fire and artillery. The fire began to creep toward the wounded soldiers. Lt. Colonel William P. Martin who was commanding the 1st and 15th combined Arkansas Regiments, jumped on the earthworks and ordered his Confederate soldiers to cease firing. He then waved a white flag of truce yelling to the Union soldiers to "come and get your wounded, they are burning to death." For a short time the Union and Confederate soldiers helped remove the wounded and put out the fires. The next day the Union generals presented Martin with two Colt Revolvers as a thank you for his humanitarian efforts. Later the opposing forces began to fire at each other again.

The regiment and it colors were captured, along with much of Govan's Brigade at the Battle of Jonesboro, Georgia, on Sept. 1, 1864. Due to a special cartel between Union General Sherman and Confederate General John B. Hood, the unit was quickly paroled and exchanged for Union prisoner held at Andersonville Prison. The regiment re-entered service approximately a month later. The 1st/15th reported 15 killed, 67 wounded, and 3 missing during the Battle of Atlanta.

The regiment and the rest of Govan's Brigade were released and exchanged just in time to participate in General John B. Hood's disastrous Franklin-Nashville Campaign. Due to the appalling losses suffered by Govan's Brigade during the Atlanta Campaign, the 1st/15th, 5th/13th and 2nd/24th Arkansas Regiments were consolidated into one regiment, which was commanded by Colonel Peter Green of the 5th/13th (specifically of the 5th). The other officers of the consolidated regiment were Major Alexander T. Meek, of the 2nd/24th Arkansas, Captain Mordecai P. Garrett and Sergeant Major Thomas Benton Moncrief of the 15th Arkansas. The consolidated regiment fought under the colors of the consolidated 5th/13th Arkansas Regiment, because this was one of the only colors not captured when Govan's Brigade was overrun at the Battle of Jonesboro. The flag of the combined 5th/13th Arkansas was issued in March 1864 and was captured by Benjamin Newman of the 88th Illinois Infantry at the battle of Franklin. The consolidated regiment numbered just 300 rifles and sustained 66% casualties during the Battle of Franklin.

The remnants of Govan's Brigade that survived the Tennessee Campaign remained with the Army of Tennessee through its final engagements in the 1865 Carolinas campaign. The 15th Arkansas participated in the following engagements:

- Battle of Shiloh, Tennessee, April 6–7, 1862.
- Siege of Corinth, April to June 1862.
- Kentucky Campaign, Kentucky, August – October, 1862.
  - Battle of Richmond, Kentucky, August 29–30, 1862.
  - Battle of Perryville, Kentucky, October 8, 1862.
- Battle of Murfreesboro, Tennessee, December 31, 1862 – January 3, 1863.
- Tullahoma Campaign, June 1863.
  - Battle of Liberty Gap, Tennessee, June 24–26, 1863.
- Chickamauga Campaign, Georgia, August–September, 1863.
  - Battle of Chickamauga, Georgia, September 19–20, 1863.
- Chattanooga campaign, September–November 1863.
  - Battle of Missionary Ridge, Tennessee, November 25, 1863.
  - Battle of Ringgold Gap, Georgia, November 27, 1863.
- Atlanta campaign, May–September 1864.
  - Battle of Rocky Face Ridge, Georgia, May 5–11, 1864.
  - Battle of Resaca, Georgia, May 14–15, 1864.
  - Battle of New Hope Church, Georgia, May 25–June 4, 1864.
  - Battle of Kennesaw Mountain, Georgia, June 27, 1864.
  - Battle of Peachtree Creek, Georgia, July 20, 1864.
  - Siege of Atlanta, Georgia, July 22, 1864.
  - Battle of Jonesboro, Georgia, August 31–September 1, 1864.
- Franklin–Nashville Campaign, Alabama, Georgia and Tennessee, September 18–December 27, 1864.
  - Battle of Spring Hill, Tennessee, November 29, 1864.
  - Battle of Franklin, Tennessee, November 30, 1864.
  - Battle of Nashville, Tennessee, December 15–16, 1864.
- Carolinas campaign, February–April 1865.
  - Battle of Bentonville, North Carolina, March 19–21, 1865.

== Flags ==
There are three surviving flags associated with the 15th Arkansas, the flags of the Phillips Guards, and the Jefferson Guards, both prewar militia units, and the flag of the 1st Arkansas which represented the 1st/15th Arkansas Consolidated.

Flag of the Phillips Guards

Like other regiments in Hardee's Corps, the 15th Arkansas probably carried a Hardee Pattern Battle flag, with a large white moon on a blue field, similar to flags of the 6th Arkansas Infantry Regiment. Miss Emma Rightor, representing the young ladies of Helena, presented a flag to Capt. Joseph C. Barlow of the Phillips Guards, upon the unit's return from the Seizure of the Little Rock Arsenal. The Phillips Guards became Company G, 15th Arkansas and the flag was donated to the Phillips County Museum (now the Helena Museum of Phillips County) in 1925, where it continues to be on display. the flag consisted of a white field with the seal of the state of Arkansas being the focal point and an eagle resting on top of the seal while holding the United States flag in its beak. The word "Onward" appears at the left of the seal, and "Upward" appears at the right. This flag was presented to the Phillips Guards on February 22, 1861, when there was as yet no official Confederate flag pattern to copy. It is unlikely that the flag was actually carried in any engagement.

The flag of the Jefferson Guards was presented to the company on May 15, 1861, while the unit was stationed at Camp Rector, near present-day West Memphis. The Jefferson Guards became Company H, 15th Arkansas. The flag is 48 in × 96 in (1,200 mm × 2,400 mm) and consists of a blue field with the letters JG surrounded by the inscription "FIAT JUSTICIA RUAT COELUM" and "ARKANSAS". The reverse side of the flat has a cotton plant surrounded by 15 stars and the inscription "REGNANT POPULI". The flag was apparently actually carried with the regiment through the engagements at Shiloh, the Kentucky Campaign, and Murfreesboro. The flag was returned to Arkansas by the State of Illinois in 1986. The flag is currently in the collection of the Pine Bluff/Jefferson County Historical Museum, Pine Bluff, Arkansas.

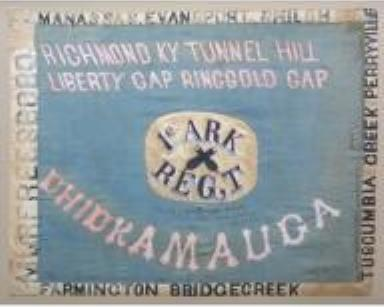

The Hardee Pattern Flag which represented the 1st/15th Consolidated Arkansas Infantry Regiments during the Atlanta Campaign is a cotton and wool flag with faded blue field. The central device is a white disc with black crossed cannons in the center (each 3 1/2 in (89 mm) wool). Designation lettering is 2 in (51 mm) Capitol Romans with red shadow: 1st ARK. REG'T. Honors lettering on the field above the disc is 2 1/2 in (64 mm) tall Capital Romans: RICHMOND, KY, TUNNELL HILL, LIBERTY GAP, RINGGOLD GAP. Honors lettering below the disc are gold, ornate, 4 in (100 mm) letters: CHICKAMAUGA, border is white with black capitol Romans: MANASSAS, EVANSPORT, SHILOH, TUSCUMBIA CREEK, PERRYVILLE, FARMINGTON, BRIDGECREEK, MURFREESBORO. All lettering is painted. Captured by the 14th Michigan Inf. at Jonesboro, Georgia, on 1 September 1864. Returned to the State of Arkansas in 1905 by the U.S. War Department. Currently in the collection of the Old State House Museum, Little Rock, Arkansas.

According to the unpublished diary of Lt. William Huddleston of Co. A, the 15th lost a flag of unknown pattern at the Battle of Liberty Gap, June 25, 1863.

== Consolidation and surrender ==
At the end of the war, Cleburne's old regiment finally recovered its original designation, after a fashion. In the massive reorganization of the Army of Tennessee on April 9, 1865, the 15th Arkansas was consolidated with nine other depleted Arkansas regiments, the 1st Arkansas, 2nd Arkansas, 5th Arkansas, 8th Arkansas, 13th Arkansas, 19th (Dawson's) Arkansas, 24th Arkansas and the 3rd Confederate Infantry Regiment. They were lumped together to form the 1st Arkansas Consolidated Infantry. The survivors of the 15th Arkansas were consolidated into a single understrength company, "Company H" of the new 1st Arkansas Consolidated Infantry. The 1st Arkansas Consolidated Infantry surrendered with the Army of Tennessee at Greensboro, North Carolina, on April 26, 1865.

== See also ==
- List of Confederate units from Arkansas
- Confederate Units by State
