= 5th Arkansas Infantry Regiment =

Infantry regiment of the Confederate States Army

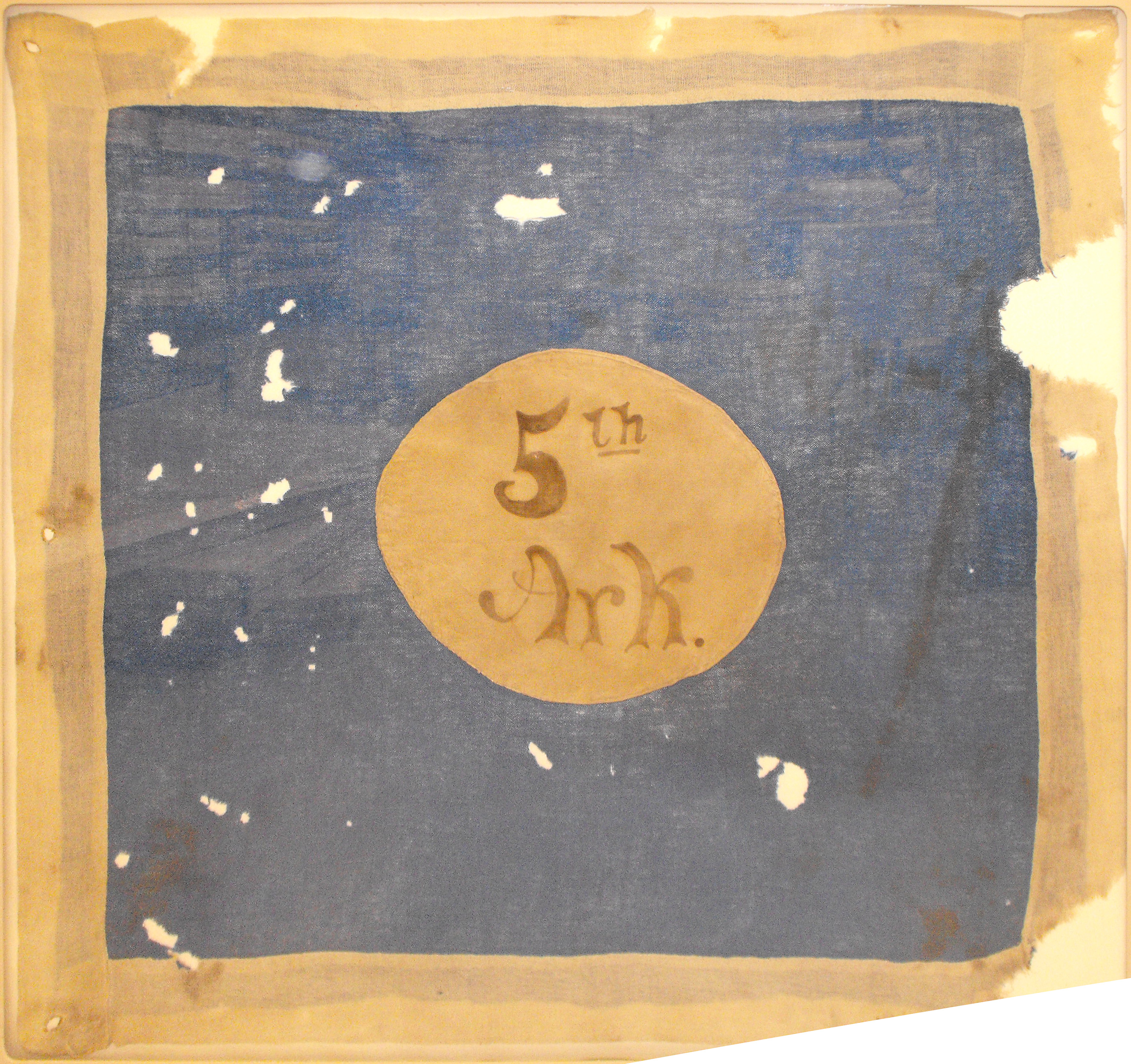
- Regimental Color of the Fifth Arkansas at the Texas Civil War Museum in Fort Worth, Texas
- Active: 1861–1865
- Disbanded: April 26, 1865
- Country: Confederate States
- Allegiance: Arkansas
- Branch: Army
- Type: Infantry
- Size: Regiment
- Facings: Light blue
- Engagements: American Civil War: Siege of Corinth; Kentucky Campaign; Battle of Perryville; Battle of Murfreesboro; Tullahoma Campaign; Battle of Liberty Gap; Chickamauga Campaign; Battle of Chickamauga; Chattanooga campaign; Battle of Missionary Ridge; Battle of Ringgold Gap; Atlanta campaign; Battle of Rocky Face Ridge; Battle of Resaca; Battle of New Hope Church; Battle of Kennesaw Mountain; Battle of Peachtree Creek; Siege of Atlanta; Battle of Jonesboro; Franklin–Nashville Campaign; Battle of Franklin; Battle of Nashville; Carolinas campaign; Battle of Bentonville
- Battle honors: Confederate Roll of Honor: 10 soldiers for the Battle of Chickamauga

Commanders
- Notable commanders: Colonel John E. Murray †

The 5th Arkansas Infantry Regiment (also known as the "Fifth Arkansas") was an infantry formation in the Confederate States Army during the American Civil War. It served throughout the war in the western theater, seeing action in the Kentucky, Tennessee and Georgia campaigns. Following its depletion in numbers the regiment was consolidated several times with other Arkansas regiments, finally merging in 1865 into the 1st Arkansas Consolidated Infantry Regiment. Another Arkansas unit also had the designation 5th Arkansas, the 5th Regiment, Arkansas State Troops which participated in the Battle of Wilson's Creek, but was never transferred to Confederate Service. There is no connection between the two units.

== Formation ==
This regiment was organized for one year in state service at Gainesville in Greene County, Arkansas, on June 28, 1861, and was transferred to Confederate service on July 27, 1861, at Pocahontas, Arkansas. It was reorganized for the war at Corinth, Mississippi, on May 12, 1862. The field officers were David C. Cross, Lucius Featherston, Peter V. Green, and J. E. Murray; Lieutenant Colonels E. A. Howell and B. F. Sweeney; and Majors T. W. Ellsberry and Riddick Pope. The regiment would spend the duration of the war in the service of the Confederate Army of Tennessee, fighting in the western theater. The unit was composed of volunteer companies from the following counties:

- Company A, Commanded by Captain S.L. Miller, organized at Pineville, Poinsett County, Arkansas, on 15 July 1861.
- Company B, the "Walker Grays", Commanded by Captain Lawrence R. Frisk, organized at Wittsburg, Arkansas, on June 12, 1861.
- Company C, the "Sweeney Riflemen", also known as the "Bevering Riflemen" Commanded by Captain Henry C. Fisher, organized at Warren, Arkansas, on May 14, 1862. This company had originally been organized on January 26, 1861, as a volunteer company in the 27th Regiment, Arkansas State Militia, under the command of Captain Benjamin F. Sweeney.
- Company D, Commanded by Captain W.G. Bohaning, organized at Wittsburg, Arkansas, on July 13, 1861.
- Company E, the "Gainesville Guards", Commanded by Captain W.C. Rayburn, organized at Gainesville, Arkansas, on June 26, 1861. This company had originally been organized on as a volunteer company in the 27th Regiment, Arkansas State Militia, under the command of Captain Captain Flavius S. White.
- Company F, the "Harrisburg Riflemen", Commanded by Captain G.F. Smith, organized at Wittsburg, Arkansas, on June 12, 1861. This company had originally been organized on as a volunteer company in the 14th Regiment, Arkansas State Militia, under the command of Captain G.F. Smith.
- Company G, the "Brownsville Rifles", commanded by Captain Robert S. Gantt, organized at Brownsville, Arkansas, on May 31, 1861. This company had originally been organized on May 2, 1861, as a volunteer company in the 50th Regiment, Arkansas State Militia, Prairie County.
- Company H, commanded by Captain John L. Kuykendoll, organized at Gainesville, Arkansas, on September 28, 1861.
- Company I, the "Austin Rifles", Commanded by Captain B.H. Cozart, organized at Brownsville, Arkansas, on June 14, 1861. This company had originally been organized on May 22, 1861, as a volunteer company in the 50th Regiment, Arkansas State Militia, Prairie County.
- Company K, the "Arkansas Toothpicks", commanded by Captain Augustus B. Washington, organized at Wittsburg, Arkansas, on June 13, 1861.
- Unlettered Company, Commanded by Captain Poindexter Dunn.

A letter from a member of the Brownsville Rifles to the Des Arc Citizen described the outcome of the election for regimental officers:

IN CAMP NEAR GAINSVILLE [sic], ARK.,
July 6, 1861.

EDITOR CITIZEN:

Nothing of interest transpired on our trip from Des Arc to Pocahontas. The latter place we found to be a hill-side town, distinguished mainly for high prices and mean whiskey. We may here remark that it is an absolute outrage, and one for which the public indignation should be severe, for merchants to raise the prices of goods simply because they are needed by the soldiers. We know of several instances of this kind but shall not now particularize.

The two companies from Prairie left Pocahontas on 24 June, and arrived at Gainesville on the evening of the 26th after a most fatiguing march of more than two days. The route, for a great portion of the way, was through Cache river bottom, and the mud and water made the trip one long to be remembered.

The election for regimental officers for this, the 5th Regiment of Arkansas Volunteers, transpired on Friday the 28th ult., and resulted as follows: Col. D. C. Cross; Lieut. Col. B. F. Sweeny; and Major Pope. The election of Col. Cross caused dissatisfaction among some of the companies who preferred the elevation of another gentleman to that position. Believing that they sincerely regret their course in the premises we forbear mentioning their names. The Col. elect has not yet arrived and we are consequently enabled to judge him only by report. His high position in life, and the testimonials of his friends induce the conclusion that the selection has been a high one.

Lieut. Col. Sweeney is a gentleman of commanding personal appearance, and is eminently qualified for the position to which he is elected. In the absence of the Colonel he has taken charge of the Regiment.

The two companies from your county have had some sickness in their ranks, but no case, however, of a serious nature. The men generally are cheerful and contented, and perform their duties, even when severe, with the utmost alacrity. The Regiment will probably remain here for some time yet, and friends desirous of writing to members of our company may direct to Gainesville.

Enclosed you will find an accurate roll of the officers and members of the “Brownsville Rifle Guards” which you will be kind enough to insert.

Yours,
PRAIRIE

The regiment was armed with weapons which the state confiscated when the Federal Arsenal at Little Rock was seized by Arkansas State Militia troops in February 1861. Disposition of the weapons found in the Arsenal is somewhat sketchy, but from various records it can be surmised that the 5th, 6th, 7th, and 8th Arkansas Infantry Regiments, mustered in June, 1861, were issued M1816/M1822 .69 caliber flintlocks. They retained these weapons until April, 1862 when they were able to exchange them for better weapons scavenged from the battlefield at Shiloh.

== History ==
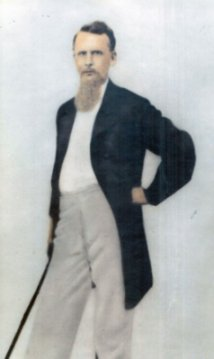
Colonel David C. Cross

The regiment moved with the rest of General Hardee's division to Bowling Green, Kentucky, where Hardee's Division became the Army of Central Kentucky. After the losses of Fort Henry and Fort Donelson in February 1862, Confederate General Albert Sidney Johnston withdrew his forces into western Tennessee, northern Mississippi, and Alabama to reorganize. and then retreated through western Tennessee to northern Mississippi. In the reorganization of forces, the 5th Arkansas was assigned to Hindman's (later Liddell's) brigade, Army of Mississippi in March, 1862. At the time the Battle at Shiloh took place, the 5th Arkansas was on picket duty along the Memphis & Charleston Railroad, about 7 miles north and west of Corinth. Colonel David C. Cross pleaded with Gen. Albert Sidney Johnston to permit the 5th Arkansas to take part in the movement towards Shiloh, but Johnston replied that "the post of duty was the post of honor," and kept the 5th Arkansas on picket duty.

In early May 1862, Confederate forces underwent an army-wide reorganization due to the passage of the Conscription Act by the Confederate Congress in April 1862. All twelve-month regiments had to re-muster and enlist for two additional years or the duration of the war; a new election of officers was ordered; and men who were exempted from service by age or other reasons under the Conscription Act were allowed to take a discharge and go home. Officers who did not choose to stand for re-election were also offered a discharge. The reorganization was accomplished among all the Arkansas regiments in and around Corinth, Mississippi, following the Battle of Shiloh. When Corinth was evacuated on the approach of Halleck and Grant in May 1862, the regiment fell back with the Confederate army to Tupelo Mississippi, where it was reorganized. Captain L. P. Featherston was elected colonel, J. E. Murray, Lieutenant Colonel, and Captain Peter Green, major; J. J. Winston was appointed adjutant.

When General Braxton Bragg led the Army of Mississippi on the Kentucky Campaign, the 5th Arkansas became engaged in the Battle of Perryville. While in Kentucky, John Edward Murray was made Lieutenant Colonel, upon the resignation of Lieutenant Colonel Sweeney.

The regiment was assigned to General Liddell's and Govan's Brigade, and consolidated with the 13th Arkansas from August 1863 to April 9, 1865. The regiment was organized with 722 officers and men and lost forty-two percent of the 336 at the Battle of Murfreesboro. The 5th/13th lost forty-five percent of the 450 engaged at the Battle of Chickamauga. Colonel L. Featherston was also killed on the first day of battle and was succeeded by Colonel Murray. The unit had 21 men disabled at the Battle of Ringgold Gap.

Colonel John E. Murray, was killed in action on July 22, 1864, during the Atlanta Campaign. Colonel Peter V. Green succeeded Colonel Murray and remained in command until the close of the war. The consolidated 5th/13th totaled 321 men and 222 arms in December 1863, and reported 112 casualties at the Battle of Atlanta.

The regiment and the rest of Govan's Brigade participated in General John B. Hood's disastrous Franklin-Nashville Campaign. Due to the appalling losses suffered by Govan's Brigade during the Atlanta Campaign, the 1st/15th, 5th/13th and 2nd/24th Arkansas Regiments were consolidated into one regiment, which was commanded by Colonel Peter Green of the 5th/13th (specifically of the 5th). The other officers of the consolidated regiment were Major Alexander T. Meek, of the 2nd/24th Arkansas, Captain Mordecai P. Garrett and Sergeant Major Thomas Benton Moncrief of the 15th Arkansas. The consolidated regiment fought under the colors of the consolidated 5th/13th Arkansas Regiment, because this was one of the only colors not captured when Govan's Brigade was overrun at the Battle of Jonesboro. The flag of the combined 5th/13th Arkansas was issued in March 1864 and was captured by Benjamin Newman of the 88th Illinois Infantry at the battle of Franklin. The consolidated regiment numbered just 300 rifles and sustained 66% casualties during the Battle of Franklin.

The remnants of Govan's Brigade that survived the Tennessee Campaign remained with the Army of Tennessee through its final engagements in the 1865 Carolinas campaign.

The remnants of ten depleted Arkansas regiments, along with one mostly-Arkansas regiment, in the Army of Tennessee were consolidated into a single regiment at Smithfield, North Carolina, on April 9, 1865.

The 1st Arkansas, was lumped together with the 2nd, 5th, 6th, 7th, 8th, 15th, 19th and 24th Arkansas Infantry Regiments and the 3rd Confederate Infantry Regiment as the 1st Arkansas Consolidated Infantry on April 9, 1865. On April 26, 1865, the 1st Arkansas Consolidated Infantry Regiment was present with the Army of Tennessee when it surrendered in Greensboro, North Carolina.

== Battles ==
The unit is credited with the following engagements:

- Siege of Corinth, April–June 1862.
- Kentucky Campaign, Kentucky, August–October, 1862
  - Battle of Perryville, Kentucky, October 8, 1862.
- Battle of Murfreesboro, Tennessee, December 31, 1862 – January 3, 1863.
- Tullahoma Campaign, June 24 – July 3, 1863.
  - Battle of Liberty Gap, Tennessee, June 24–26, 1863.
- Chickamauga Campaign, Georgia, August–September, 1863.
  - Battle of Chickamauga, Georgia, September 19–20, 1863.
- Chattanooga campaign, September to November 1863.
  - Battle of Missionary Ridge, Tennessee, November 25, 1863.
  - Battle of Ringgold Gap, Georgia, November 27, 1863.
- Atlanta campaign, May to September 1864.
  - Battle of Rocky Face Ridge, Georgia, May 5–11, 1864.
  - Battle of Resaca, Georgia, May 14–15, 1864.
  - Battle of New Hope Church, Georgia, May 25 – June 4, 1864.
  - Battle of Pickett's Mill, Georgina, May 27, 1864.
  - Battle of Kennesaw Mountain, Georgia, June 27, 1864.
  - Battle of Peachtree Creek, Georgia, July 20, 1864.
  - Siege of Atlanta, Georgia, July 22, 1864.
  - Battle of Jonesboro, Georgia, August 31 – September 1, 1864.
- Franklin–Nashville Campaign, Alabama, Georgia, and Tennessee, September 18 – December 27, 1864
  Battle of Spring Hill, Tennessee, November 29, 1864.
  - Battle of Franklin, Tennessee, November 30, 1864.
  - Battle of Nashville, Tennessee, December 15–16, 1864.
- Carolinas campaign, February – April 1865.
  - Battle of Bentonville, North Carolina, March 19–21, 1865.

== Regimental colors ==
A flag was presented to Company A, the Moro Greys, from Calhoun County, by Miss Lucy Lorraine Adams

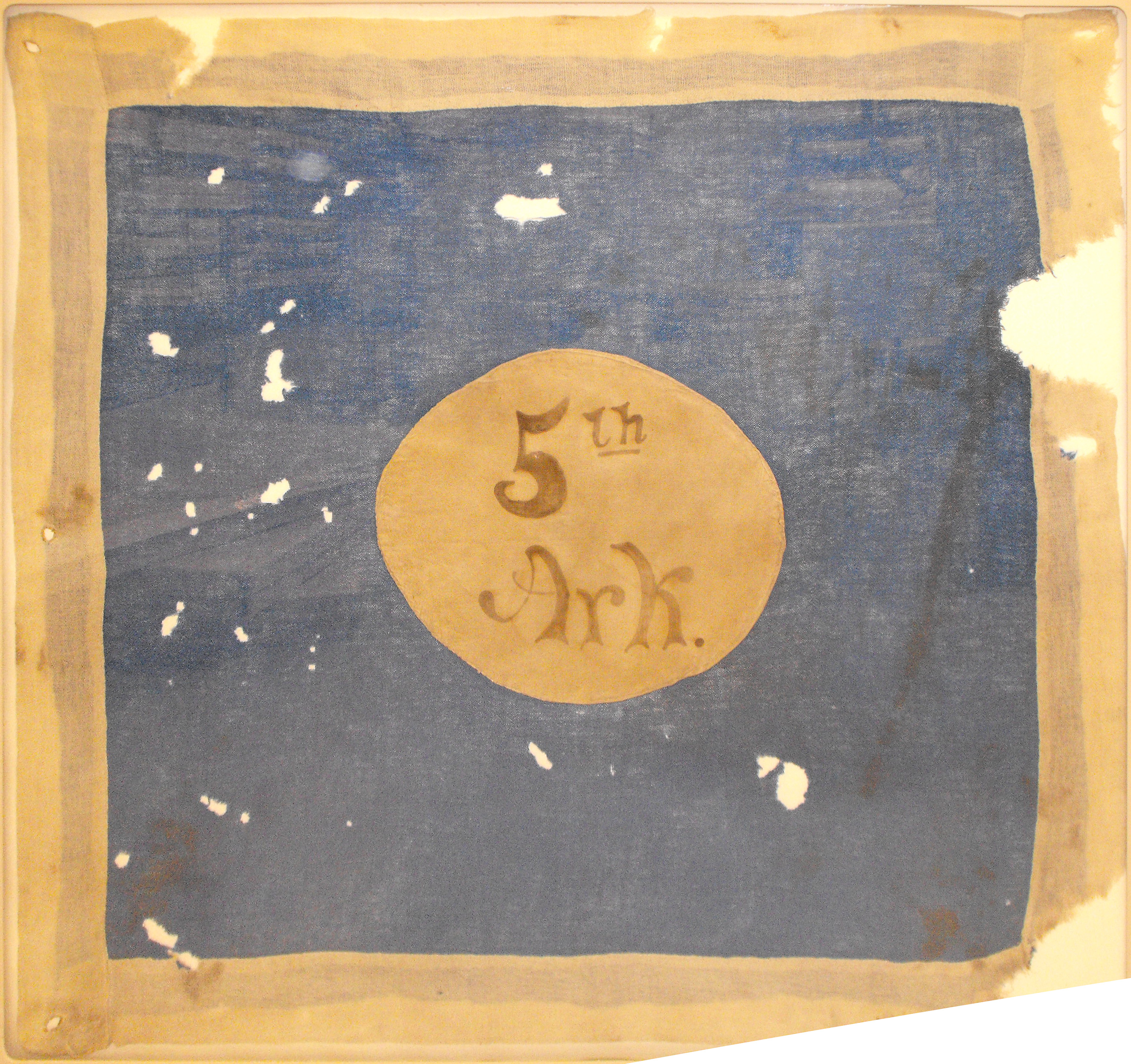
Regimental Color of the 5th Arkansas

It is likely that 5th Arkansas had a First National pattern regimental flag when it entered service, but after being transferred to the Army of Central Kentucky at Bowling Green in late 1861, they would have been issued the first of the Buckner/Hardee pattern battle flags, blue field with a white circle in the center and possibly the unit's name in the circle.

The regiment was assigned to St. John Lidell's Brigade, part of Major General Patrick Cleburne’s Division, which fought the entire war under Hardee Pattern battle flags. There are two existing flags of this type for the 5th Arkansas; one is currently in the collection of the Texas Civil War Museum in Fort Worth Texas and the second is in private hands. The flag which is currently located at the Texas Civil War Museum is of a later issue than the January 1862 flags and has the unit number in the white circle while the other is for the combined 5th/13th Arkansas.

The flag of the combined 5th/13th Arkansas was issued in March 1864 and was captured by Benjamin Newman of the 88th Illinois Infantry at the battle of Franklin, Tennessee. The flag-staff for this flag is also in private hands and it is stenciled; "5th & 6th Arkansas - B. Newman". The curator of the Carter House in Franklin, Tom Carter, says it was mistakenly labeled, and should have been the "5th & 13th", which were consolidated at the time of the battle. The 6th Arkansas by that time was consolidated with the 7th Arkansas. Research shows the flag at that time was a "white moon on a blue field". The 5th/13th Arkansas flag was one of five captured by the 88th Illinois at the Battle of Franklin, and none were forwarded to the War Department. It was last seen at Nashville when the 88th Illinois displayed the captured flags to General Thomas. The division commander stated, "They were afterward sent home by those who captured them. Since then they have been ordered to be returned, and will be forwarded to department headquarters as soon as they arrive." However, none were ever returned.

== See also ==
- List of Confederate units from Arkansas

== Bibliography ==
- Barnhill, Floyd R. Sr. with Calvin L. Collier. The Fighting Fifth: Pat Cleburne's Cutting Edge, The Fifth Arkansas Infantry Regiment, C.S.A. (Jonesboro, AR: The Authors, 1990).
