= Daniel Govan =

American miner, planter, and Confederate soldier

Daniel Chevilette Govan
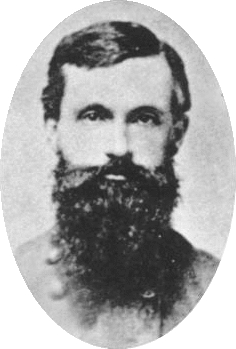
- Born: July 4, 1829; Northampton County, North Carolina, US
- Died: March 12, 1911 (aged 81); Memphis, Tennessee, US
- Military career
- Allegiance: Confederate States of America
- Branch: Confederate States Army
- Service years: 1861–65
- Rank: Brigadier General
- Conflicts: American Civil War: Battle of Shiloh; Battle of Perryville; Battle of Stones River; Battle of Chickamauga; Battle of Missionary Ridge; Battle of Ringgold Gap; Battle of Pickett's Mill; Battle of Jonesborough; Battle of Nashville (WIA)

Daniel Chevilette Govan (July 4, 1829 – March 12, 1911) was an American miner, planter, and soldier. He served as a Confederate general during the American Civil War, prominent in campaigns and battles in the Western Theater.

== Early life and career ==
Daniel C. Govan was born in Northampton County, North Carolina. His father was U.S. Representative Andrew R. Govan from South Carolina, who in 1832 relocated the family to Marshall County, Mississippi, where he was raised. Govan received his primary education from private tutoring and then attended South Carolina College (modern day University of South Carolina) graduating in 1848.

Govan participated in the 1849 California Gold Rush along with his cousin Benjamin McCulloch, who would also become a Confederate general. In 1850 Govan was elected deputy sheriff of Sacramento, and two years later he returned to Mississippi and took up work as a planter. In December 1853 Govan married Mary Fogg Otey, the daughter of prominent theologian James Hervey Otey, with whom he would have 14 children. In 1860 he moved to Helena, Arkansas, and again became a planter.

== Civil War service ==
At the beginning of the American Civil War in 1861, Govan chose to follow his home state and the Confederate cause. He raised a company of men and in May he was appointed a captain in the Arkansas State forces. On June 5 he was elected lieutenant colonel in the 2nd Arkansas Infantry Regiment, and on January 28, 1862, was promoted to colonel and given command of the regiment.

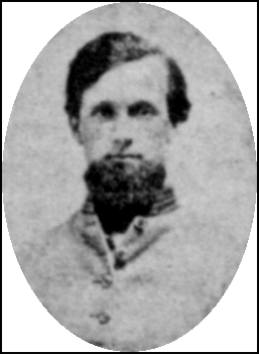
Govan during the Civil War

Govan and his men participated in the Battle of Shiloh in April 1862. Following Shiloh, Govan took part in Edmund Kirby Smith's Kentucky Campaign and fought at the Battle of Perryville in October. At one point during this battle Govan temporarily commanded a brigade. He then fought at the Battle of Stones River that winter and at the Battle of Chickamauga in September 1863. Govan led a brigade in the Reserve Corps of the Army of Tennessee from August to November. During the Battle of Missionary Ridge Govan played a prominent role in the Battle of Ringgold Gap, receiving high praise from his commander, Maj. Gen. Patrick Cleburne.

On December 29, 1863, Govan was promoted to the rank of brigadier general. His command consisting of the 5th, 6th, 7th, and 8th Arkansas Infantry Regiments. Govan's brigade participated in the Atlanta campaign, and he received particular mention for his conduct at the Battle of Pickett's Mill in May 1864. Govan was captured after a fierce battle at the Battle of Jonesborough on September 1, but was exchanged for George Stoneman on October 2.

Govan served the remainder of the war with the Army of Tennessee, participating in the Franklin-Nashville Campaign and then the Carolinas campaign. He was seriously wounded in his throat on December 16 at Nashville. Govan surrendered in 1865 with Gen. Joseph E. Johnston at Greensboro, North Carolina. He was paroled from there on May 1 and was pardoned by the U.S. Government on December 12.

== Postbellum career ==
Following the war, Govan returned home and resumed farming. He later served as the Indian agent at the Tulalip Agency in the state of Washington in 1894. Govan died in 1911 at the home of one of his children in Memphis, Tennessee. His body was brought to Holly Springs, Mississippi, and was buried at the city's Hillcrest Cemetery.

== See also ==
- List of American Civil War generals (Confederate)
