= 19th Arkansas Infantry Regiment (Dawson's) =

Infantry regiment of the Confederate States Army

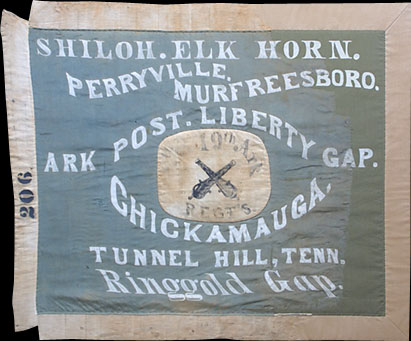
- Regimental color of the 8th and 19th Arkansas at the Old State House Museum in Little Rock, Arkansas
- Active: 1861–1865
- Disbanded: April 26, 1865
- Country: Confederate States
- Allegiance: Arkansas
- Branch: Army
- Type: Infantry
- Size: Regiment
- Facings: Light blue
- Battles: American Civil War; Battle of Pea Ridge; Battle of Arkansas Post; Battle of Murfreesboro; Battle of Chickamauga; Battle of Missionary Ridge; Battle of Ringgold Gap; Battle of Rocky Face Ridge; Battle of Resaca; Battle of New Hope Church; Battle of Pickett's Mill; Battle of Kennesaw Mountain; Battle of Peachtree Creek; Battle of Atlanta; Battle of Jonesboro; Battle of Franklin; Battle of Nashville; Battle of Bentonville

The 19th Arkansas Infantry Regiment (also known as "Dawson's regiment") was an infantry formation in the Confederate States Army during the American Civil War.

The regiment was present for but not engaged during the Battle of Pea Ridge. At the Battle of Arkansas Post, the regiment became split, with part of the regiment surrendering with the garrison when the post capitulated. The captured portion of the regiment was eventually exchanged and released on the east side of the Mississippi and served the remainder of the war with the Confederate Army of Tennessee. The un-captured portion of the regiment was consolidated with the remnants of the 24th Arkansas and served the remainder of the war in the Department of the Trans-Mississippi.

== Formation ==
19th (Dawson's) Infantry Regiment completed its organization at Nashville, Arkansas, in November 1861. The field officers were Colonel C. L. Dawson; Lieutenant Colonels A. S. Hutchison and P. R. Smith; and Majors Joseph Anderson, David H. Hamiter, and John G. McKean. The unit was inducted into Confederate Service at Nashville, Arkansas, on November 21, 1861. The 19th Arkansas Regiment was organized from seven companies from Hempstead, Pike, Polk and Sevier counties. Three additional companies from Hempstead, Scott and Sevier were later added, the last (Company K) on March 3, 1862. Several Companies contained officers and men who had previously served in the 5th Regiment, Arkansas State Troops, which had disbanded rather than enter Confederate service following the Battle of Wilson's Creek. Charles L. Dawson, who had previously commanded the 37th Arkansas Militia Regiment of Sevier County, was elected colonel at the regiment's organization. The unit was composed of volunteer companies from the following locations in Arkansas:

- Company A – Commanded by Captain W. B. Spear, organized on October 10, 1861, at Antoine, Pike County. Captain Spear had originally been elected as the Captain of a "Home Guard" company in the 38th Regiment, Arkansas State Militia on August 7, 1861.
- Company B – Commanded by Captain Booker Cullen "B.C.", Haller", organized October 18, 1861, at Center Point, Howard County.
- Company C – Commanded by Captain John W. Robinson, organized October 19, 1861, in Pike County.
- Company D – Commanded by Captain R. L. Duncan, organized June 1, 1862, in Polk County.
- Company E – Commanded by Captain L. F. Carter, organized October 30, 1861, in Sevier County.
- Company F – Commanded by Captain John G. McKean, organized June 16, 1862, at Paraclifta, Sevier County. Captain McKean had originally organized the "Sevier County Stars", a volunteer militia Company in the 37th Regiment, Arkansas State Militia. The unit became Company H, 5th Regiment, Arkansas State Troops, and served under Colonel Dockery at Wilson's Creek.
- Company G – Commanded by Captain D. C. Cowling, organized November 19, 1861, at Nashville, Howard County. Captain Cowling had originally served as a Second Lieutenant in the volunteer militia company known as the "Davis Blues" from Nashville which became Company F of the 5th Regiment, Arkansas State Troop under Colonel Dockery at Wilson's Creek.">
- Company H – Commanded by Captain A. J. Rader, organized February 22, 1862, at Waldron, Scott County.
- Company I – Commanded by Captain L. W. Delony, organized February 26, 1862, at Nashville, Howard County. A number of men in this company had previously served in Company F of the 5th Regiment, Arkansas State Troop under Colonel Dockery at Wilson's Creek.">
- Company K – Commanded by Captain A. J. Jones, organized March 3, 1862, in Sevier County.

The 19th (Dawson's) Arkansas Regiment had strong support among the population where it was recruited. Even though there was a certain degree of pro-Union sentiment in the mountains of southwest Arkansas, the region continued to supply large numbers of recruits to the 19th Arkansas, and civilians kept up a steady supply of clothing, equipment and other supplies to the men. In fact, the 19th Arkansas started off as one of the largest (in terms of number of men), best clothed (their unique frock coats and Australian-style hats were unmistakable), and best equipped (though marginally armed) Arkansas regiments. The company officers were professionals who were familiar with infantry drill and tactics, mostly men who had been active in the prewar militia. Many were veterans of the Arkansas State Troops and had seen combat close up and personal at the Battle of Wilson's Creek. Many of the staff officers were former businessmen who were used to keeping up with records and reports. Some privates of the regiment were also literate, and their letters home have provided insights to modern researchers.

== History ==
=== Pea Ridge ===
Still unsupplied with sufficient arms, the 19th Arkansas was present, but not engaged, at the Battle of Pea Ridge, where it was detailed to guard the army's train. After the battle, the 19th Arkansas was stationed on the border for a few months, and was ordered to conduct a long, difficult and pointless march through the Indian Territory. The regiment was ravaged by disease during this period. Today, the graves of some of the soldiers of the 19th Arkansas can still be found in the Confederate Cemetery at Atoka, Oklahoma. Many other men were left behind sick at various places, and were never heard from again.

Returning to Arkansas, the regiment was reorganized for the war on August 13, 1862, and was issued new arms and equipment. Recruiting details from the 19th Arkansas had been busy in May and June, bringing a large number of new recruits back with them to Camp White Sulphur Springs, near Pine Bluff. The 19th Arkansas did not receive many of these recruits, however. Many of the new recruits died of disease before they were mustered into service, and were buried in untold numbers of unmarked graves at White Sulphur Springs. Others were shamelessly "shanghaied" and assigned to other units. The 24th Arkansas Regiment received a large number of men recruited by the 19th Arkansas, and Hart's Arkansas Battery was reconstituted by the addition of many of the 19th Arkansas recruits.

=== Arkansas Post ===
Assigned to the garrison of Fort Hindman at Arkansas Post, a large part of the regiment was captured when the fort was surrendered on January 11, 1863. Some of the men were absent from Arkansas Post, and they were subsequently organized into a new regiment (Hardy's). The men who were captured were sent to prisons in the North, and when exchanged in April were assigned to the Army of Tennessee, where they spent the rest of the war. Of the 633 men of the 19th Arkansas Regiment who were captured at Arkansas Post, 185 died of disease in prison, another 58 died in hospitals in Virginia after being released from prison, and 24 had taken the oath of allegiance; so the regiment entered upon its service east of the Mississippi River with only 306 men. As a result, the 19th Arkansas was field-consolidated with the survivors of the 24th Arkansas Regiment and Crawford's Arkansas Battalion (also captured at Arkansas Post), under command of Lieut. Col. Augustus S. Hutchinson of the 19th Arkansas.

=== Chickamauga ===
This consolidated unit fought together at the Battle of Chickamauga where they reported casualties of 16 killed or mortally wounded, 80 wounded, and one captured. At Chickamauga, the unit fought in a brigade made up entirely of the Arkansas Post prisoners, and commanded by General James Deshler who was killed during the battle.

After Chickamauga, the unit's consolidation was changed. The Arkansas units were moved into the Arkansas Brigade of Cleburne's division, and were destined to remain there for the rest of the war. On November 15, 1863, the 24th Ark. was removed from its attachment to the 19th and combined the 2nd and 15th Arkansas. The 8th Arkansas was then united with the 19th, to form the 8th - 19th Arkansas, which organization was to remain in place until the middle of April, 1865. However, it appears that these two units maintained separate unit structures inside the newly reorganized regiment. The ten companies of the 19th were then reorganized by combining them into five as follows:

- Company A merged with B;
- Company C merged with H;
- Company D merged with K;
- Company E merged with F; and
- Company I merged with G.

Colonel George Baucum of the 8th Arkansas assumed command of the consolidate unit. The units remained consolidated for the rest of the war. The unit saw light action at the decisive victory by General Cleburne over Sherman at Tunnel Hill on November 25, 1863, and was in reserve most of the day at the thrashing of the Union pursuit forces at Ringgold Gap, Georgia, on November 27, 1863.

=== Atlanta ===
The 8th-19th played a part in all of Cleburne's actions in the Atlanta Campaign, but particularly distinguished itself at the Battle of Pickett's Mill, when it was sent across a cornfield to counter a Union thrust which was about to turn the Confederate right flank. Cavalry General John Kelly, a former commander of the 8th Arkansas, appeared before the men, and in an electrifying charge, led them into the corn to stop the Union attack cold. Baucum and the unit were cited in General Cleburne's report on the battle. Casualties for the 19th portion of the regiment were 8 killed and 5 wounded.

The unit saw heavy action in the Battle of Atlanta, where it lost many men. Colonel Baucum was shot in the face, while Lt. Col. Hutchison was wounded in the arm. Both being lost for many months, command devolved upon Major David H. Hamiter of the 19th Arkansas, who was to command the regiment until the final days of the war. At Jonesboro, 49 men of the 19th, and 77 men of the 8th were captured when Govan's Brigade was overrun by a massive Union attack. Only heroic fighting by the remainder of the men and the rest of Cleburne's division saved the Confederate position from being destroyed. The flag of the consolidated 8th-19th was captured by Medal of Honor winner, 2nd LT Jeremiah Kuder of the 74th Indiana Infantry Regiment during this fight.

=== Franklin–Nashville ===
The 8th-19th saw action with the remainder of Cleburne's Division during the Tennessee Campaign, and was one of the few Confederate infantry units to become engaged at Spring Hill, before the curious collapse of the Confederate high command that day. On November 30, 1864, Govan's Brigade, the 19th among them lost over 60% of their men during the fateful Confederate assault at Franklin, Tennessee. Charging into the vortex of the battle around the Carter House, the unit fought hand to hand until driven into the ditch outside the second line of works. General Cleburne was one of six Confederate Generals killed during this attack.

The 8th-19th was part of the contingent of the Army of Tennessee that traveled to the Carolinas to resist the army of General Sherman. It saw action one last time at the Battle of Bentonville. At least five members of the 19th are known to have been wounded in this battle, but exact casualty figures are unknown.

The 18th/24th lost thirty-eight percent of the 226 engaged at Chickamauga, and the 8th/19th reported 16 casualties at Ringgold Gap and totaled 363 men and 285 arms in December 1863. At the Battle of Atlanta the 8th/19th had 97 men disabled.

=== Consolidation and Surrender ===
The remnants of ten depleted Arkansas regiments, along with one mostly-Arkansas regiment, in the Army of Tennessee were consolidated into a single regiment at Smithfield, North Carolina, on April 9, 1865. The 19th Arkansas, was lumped together with the 1st, 2nd, 5th, 6th, 7th, 8th, 15th, 19th, 24th Arkansas Infantry Regiments and the 3rd Confederate Infantry Regiment as the 1st Arkansas Consolidated Infantry.

Of the 1,200 men who served in the 19th at various times, only 5% were present at the end. The men of the 19th had only enough people to fill one company in the 1st Arkansas Consolidated Infantry. Company I of the 1st Consolidated Arkansas was made up of the 49 survivors of the 19th Arkansas. The unit was commanded at the surrender of the army by Captain William B. Cone, originally of Company E. On April 26, 1865, the 1st Arkansas Consolidated Infantry Regiment was present with the Army of Tennessee when it surrendered in Greensboro, North Carolina.

== Battles ==
The unit participated in the following battles:

- Battle of Pea Ridge, Arkansas, March 6–8, 1862;
- Battle of Arkansas Post, Arkansas January 9–11, 1863;
- Battle of Chickamauga, Georgia, September 19–20, 1863.
- Battle of Missionary Ridge, Tennessee, November 25, 1863.
- Battle of Ringgold Gap, Georgia, November 27, 1863.
- Battle of Rocky Face Ridge, Georgia, May 5–11, 1864;
- Battle of Resaca, Georgia, May 14–15, 1864;
- Battle of New Hope Church, Georgia, May 25 - June 4, 1864;
- Battle of Pickett's Mill, Georgia, May 27, 1864;
- Battle of Kennesaw Mountain, Georgia, June 27, 1864;
- Battle of Peachtree Creek, Georgia, July 20, 1864;
- Battle of Jonesboro, Georgia, August 31 to September 1, 1864.
- Battle of Spring Hill, Tennessee, November 29, 1864;
- Battle of Franklin, Tennessee, November 30, 1864; and
- Battle of Nashville, Tennessee, December 15–16, 1864.
- Battle of Bentonville, North Carolina, March 19–21, 1865.

== Regimental color ==
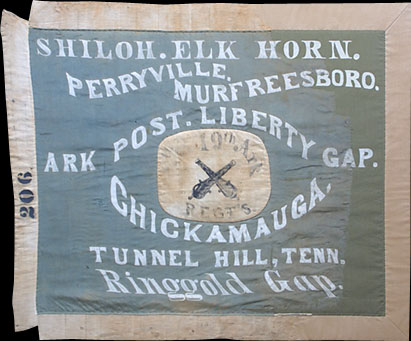
Regimental color of the 8th and 19th Arkansas Infantry Regiment

There is one surviving regimental color. The flag is a Hardee Battle flag pattern, Cleburne's Division 1864 issue. It was produced and decorated specifically for the combined unit, displaying battle honors of each. The poorly dyed blue field, now faded to pea green, is typical of the 1864 flags. When it was captured at Jonesboro, Georgia, on 1 September 1864, the flag was identified as that of an artillery battery. The honor of crossed cannon, as well as the unit's position on the battle field in support of Key's Battery, caused the confused attribution. The flag is made of cotton with black and white paint and currently measures 35" x 34 1/2". The flag was marked with War Department Capture Number 206. It is currently located at the Old State House Museum, Little Rock Arkansas.

== See also ==
- List of Confederate units from Arkansas

== Bibliography ==
- Arkansas Military Department Records, List of Commissioned Officers of the Militia 1827–1862, Arkansas History Commission, Microfilm Roll 00000038-8
- Hempstead, Fay, "A Pictorial History of Arkansas" St. Louis and New York, N. D. Thompson publishing company, 1890, Call number: 9197481
- Pence, Theo Merrill. 19th Arkansas Infantry Regiment, CSA (Dawson's). (Norman, OK: M.T. Pence, 1994).
- Sikakis, Stewart, Compendium of the Confederate Armies, Florida and Arkansas, Facts on File, Inc., 1992, ISBN 978-0-8160-2288-5
- United States. War Dept. The War of the Rebellion: A Compilation of the Official Records of the Union And Confederate Armies. Series 1, Volume 30, In Four Parts. Part 1, Reports., Book, 1890
