= 10th Cavalry =

10th Cavalry may refer to:

== Divisions ==
- 10th Cavalry Division (France)
- 10th Cavalry Division (Russian Empire)
- 10th Cavalry Division (Soviet Union)
- 10th Guards Mechanized Division, Ukraine

== Brigades ==
- 10th Cavalry Brigade (British Indian Army) of the British Indian Army in the First World War, distinct from the one below
- 10th Indian Cavalry Brigade of the British Indian Army in the First World War, distinct from the one above
- 10th Motorized Cavalry Brigade (Poland) of the pre- and early-World War II Polish Army
- 10th Armoured Cavalry Brigade (Poland) of the Polish Armed Forces in the West in World War II

== Regiments ==
- 10th Cavalry Regiment (United States)
- 10th Bengal Lancers, Indian Army
- 10th Queen Victoria's Own Corps of Guides Cavalry (Frontier Force)
- 10th Reserve Cavalry Regiment, United Kingdom
- 10th Royal Hussars, United Kingdom

=== American Civil War regiments ===
==== Union Army ====
- 10th Illinois Cavalry Regiment
- 10th Indiana Cavalry Regiment
- 10th Kentucky Cavalry Regiment
- 10th Michigan Cavalry Regiment
- 10th Missouri Cavalry Regiment
- 10th New York Cavalry Regiment
- 10th Ohio Cavalry Regiment
- 10th Tennessee Cavalry Regiment

==== Confederate Army ====
- 10th Arkansas Cavalry Regiment (Newton's)
- 10th Arkansas Cavalry Regiment (Witt's)
- 10th Virginia Cavalry Regiment

== See also ==
- 10th Division (disambiguation)
- 10th Brigade (disambiguation)
- 10th Regiment (disambiguation)
- 10th (disambiguation)
