= 11th and 17th Consolidated Arkansas Infantry Regiment =

11th/17th Arkansas Infantry
- Active: 1863–1865
- Disbanded: May 13, 1865
- Country: Confederate States
- Allegiance: Arkansas
- Branch: Army
- Type: Infantry
- Size: Regiment
- Facings: Light blue
- Engagements: American Civil War: Siege of Port Hudson; Battle of Natchez; Meridian Campaign; Battle of Concord Church

The 11th and 17th Consolidated Arkansas Infantry Regiment (1861–1865) was a Confederate Army infantry regiment during the American Civil War. The unit is also known as the 11th/17th Arkansas Mounted Infantry or the 11th/17th Arkansas Cavalry. At various times after the consolidation, members of the unit who were captured gave their unit as either the 11th Arkansas Cavalry or the 17th Arkansas Cavalry.

== Organization ==
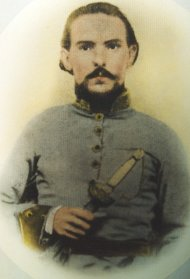
Colonel John L. Logan

In March 1863, the 11th Arkansas Infantry Regiment and the 17th (Griffith's) Arkansas Infantry Regiment were consolidated to bring the strength of each unit to an acceptable number. Col. John L. Logan assumed command, since he was the senior Colonel superseding Col. John Griffith of the 17th Arkansas Infantry. Companies H and I of the Eleventh Arkansas were combined with Company C while the remaining companies remained the same. The companies of the Seventeenth Arkansas were combined into 3 companies, H, I, and K of the new consolidated regiment. Almost immediately the Confederate War Department ordered the unit mounted, with plans for it to serve as a mounted infantry rather than as Cavalry. The "footsore" troops gladly accepted their mounts and spent long hours drilling in this new branch of service.

== Battles ==
The men of the 11th/17th Infantry would spend the remainder of the war in Louisiana and Mississippi. The men still carried long muskets but were not issued sabers and when in battle still operated on foot but only traveled from place to place on horseback. This decreased travel time by a large margin. Although the two regiments were from different parts of the State (the 11th Arkansas was mostly from Saline County and a few other southern counties), with different battle histories, the merger clicked. The first duties of the 11th/17th Infantry was to travel to Southeast Louisiana to slow Union advance while preparations were made upstream to meet the enemy.

The 11th & 17th Arkansas spent the rest of the war as the Confederate Army's 'fire brigade' in southern Mississippi. As Union columns made repeated incursions into the area over the next couple of years, the South's counter-moves invariably involved the 11th/17th Arkansas. General Benjamin Grierson's raid is a classic example of the duties of the 11/17th Arkansas.

At this time, Genl. Grierson made his famous raid across the Confederacy. The Consolidated 11th & 17th Arks. Regts. were sent out to intercept the enemy, but as Genl. Grierson, commanded his Cavly. [sic], he passed around us and went into Baton Rouge. Genl. Gardner commanding at Port Hudson sent an order out to Col. Logan (for Port Hudson had been surrounded by Genl. Banks while we were after Grierson) to seize horse and mount his command. This was done and the Regts. operated as mounted Infty., afterwards Cavalry from the vicinity of Port Hudson to Yazoo City back and forth until the close of the war, and surrendered at Jackson, Miss., Apl. 1865.

Col. Logan, some time, I think, later part 1864, was called West of the Miss. River, this through [sic] Col. Griffith in command of the Regt. and Col. Griffith commanded this Regt. and more than once a Brigade in a number of engagements within the territory mentioned. Col. Griffith was loved by all his men and a braver spirit or a man with warmer heart never left home to do battle.

I should mention an incident that was a compliment to Col. Griffith's Regt. (the Consolidated Regt). I think it was Genl. S.D. Lee, who inspected our Regt. in [the] Summer of 1864 and upon his recommendation the Secretary of War granted a furlough to the entire Regt. for 60 days, to cross the Miss. River and go from Brookhaven, Miss. or that section, to Arks. to recruit our ranks, we were now reduced to 120 men all told. It was quite dangerous to cross the Miss. River as there were gunboat all along the river and patrols constantly on the lookout for Confederates from either side. The crossing could be affected only by crossing at night time when all was quiet by the use of skiffs, one man to row and two, sometimes four, horses were carried over by holding to the bridles to keep their heads up. At the end of the sixty days the Regt. recrossed the Miss. River, below Natchez some 20 miles (32 km), the day, or night of President Lincoln's re election, though we were two nights in getting over.....

Col. Griffith commanded in a number of minor engagements after his Regt. were mounted. I cannot recall all these an [?] engagement [at] Clinton, Plains Store, La., Pig Pens near Yazoo City Miss., Ebenezer Miss., I cannot tell all. It was six men from Col. Griffith Regt. that slipped through three lines of Federal pickets, and captured Genl Neil Dow at Port Hudson. I laid the plan, and Col. Griffith commanded the attack upon the Federal Gunboat Petrel or Duchess of the old Navy. We captured the boat guns etc. [?] This one while above [?] Yazoo City, Miss.

Very Truly,

Ben B. Chism

Colonel John Griffith had previously served in Gratiot's 3rd Regiment, Arkansas State Troops

Some members of the 11/17th Consolidated Arkansas Mounted Infantry were captured at Siege of Port Hudson on July 9, 1863. These men were later released and exchanged in Arkansas and many would later join Poe's Arkansas Cavalry Battalion or Logan's Arkansas Cavalry Regiment. In November 1863 Colonel John Logan was transferred from command of the 11th/17th Arkansas back west of the Mississippi River and Col. John Griffith was given command of the brigade which consisted of:.

- 11th/17th Arkansas Mounted Infantry.
- 14th Confederate Cavalry.
- 9th Louisiana Battalion.
- 9th Tennessee Battalion.
- Stockdale's Mississippi Battalion.
- Wilbourn's Mississippi Battalion.
- Robert's Mississippi Battery.

With Colonel Logan called back west of the river and Colonel Griffith in command of the brigade, command of the 11th/17th Arkansas briefly fell to Lieutenant Colonel McDuff Vance of the 11th. Vance remained in command until November 23, 1863, when Colonel Wirt Adams was promoted to Brigadier General and was given command of the brigade. Col. Griffith was returned to the command of the 11t/17th Arkansas. Colonel Griffith seemed to have a sixth sense when it came to determining when and where to strike a larger enemy force to cause the most damage. The 11th & 17th Arkansas was renowned for its scouting and tracking abilities. The regiment served to the end of the war in this capacity.

The regiment was involved in the following engagements:

- Siege, Port Hudson, Louisiana [detachment] – May 24–July 9, 1863.
- Assault, Port Hudson, Louisiana [detachment] – May 27, 1863.
- Assault, Port Hudson, Louisiana [detachment] – June 14, 1863.
- Surrender, Port Hudson, Louisiana [detachment] – July 9, 1863.
- Skirmish, Jackson, Louisiana – August 3, 1863.
- Skirmishes, Canton Road, near Brownsville, Mississippi – October 15–16, 1863.
- Skirmish, Treadwell Plantation, near Clinton and Vernon Cross Roads, Mississippi – October 16, 1863.
- Action, Bogue Chitto Creek, Mississippi – October 17, 1863.
- Skirmish, Clinton, Mississippi – October 17, 1863.
- Skirmish, Livingston Road, near Clinton, Mississippi – October 18, 1863.
- Skirmish, Brownsville, Mississippi – October 18, 1863.
- Operations about Natchez, Mississippi – December 1–10, 1863.
- Skirmish near Natchez, Mississippi – December 7, 1863.
- Operations near Natchez, Mississippi – January 27, 1864.
- Operations against the Expedition from Vicksburg to Meridian, Mississippi – February 3–March 2, 1864.
- Skirmishes, Meridian, Mississippi – February 9–13, 1864.
- Skirmish, Canton, Mississippi – February 23, 1864.
- Skirmish near Canton, Mississippi – February 26, 1864.
- Skirmish, Canton, Mississippi – February 27, 1864.
- Skirmish near Canton, Mississippi – February 27–28, 1864.
- Action, Pearl River, Mississippi [detachment] – 28 Feb 1864.
- Skirmish, Canton, Mississippi – February 28, 1864.
- Skirmishes near Mechanicsburg, Mississippi – April 20, 1864.
- Affair near Yazoo City, Mississippi – April 22, 1864.
- Capture, Yazoo City, Mississippi – April 23, 1864.
- Skirmish, Port Gibson, Mississippi – July 14, 1864.
- Skirmish near Memphis, Tennessee – October 10, 1864.
- Skirmish near Memphis, Tennessee – October 25, 1864.
- Operations against the Expedition from Vicksburg to Yazoo City, Mississippi – November 23–December 4, 1864.
- Skirmish, Big Black River Bridge, Mississippi Central R. R., Mississippi – November 27, 1864.
- Action, Concord Church, Mississippi – December 1, 1864.
- Skirmish, Twelve Miles from Yazoo City, Mississippi – December 1, 1864.
- Skirmish, Yazoo City, Mississippi – December 2, 1864.
- Operations against the Expedition from Memphis, Tennessee – December 21, 1864 – January 5, 1865.
- Action, Egypt Station, Mississippi – December 28, 1864.
- Skirmish, Franklin, Mississippi – January 2, 1865.
- Skirmish, Lexington, Mississippi – January 3, 1865.
- Skirmish near Mechanicsburg, Mississippi – January 4, 1865.
- Skirmish, The Ponds, Mississippi – January 4, 1865.

== Surrender ==
By May 13, 1865, most of the 11th/17th Arkansas had turned themselves in to Federal garrisons in Jackson, Miss. and were paroled.

== See also ==
- List of Confederate units from Arkansas
- Confederate Units by State
