= 1st Arkansas 30 Day Volunteer Regiment =

Confederate Army infantry regiment of the American Civil War

1st Arkansas Infantry (30 Day Volunteers) (Confederate)
- Active: November 23, 1861
- Country: Confederate States
- Allegiance: Arkansas
- Branch: Army
- Type: Infantry
- Size: Regiment
- Engagements: American Civil War

The 1st Arkansas Infantry (30 Day Volunteers) (1861) was a Confederate Army infantry regiment during the American Civil War. The unit was composed mainly of militia units called to service by Colonel Solon F. Borland in response to an anticipated invasion of Northeast Arkansas in the fall of 1861.

== Organization ==
The 1st Arkansas Regiment, 30-Day Volunteers (infantry), was formally organized on November 23, 1861, which is the date of the appointments of the field and staff officers—under command of Colonel James Haywood McCaleb. Col. McCaleb was the commander of the 25th Militia Regiment, from Lawrence County, Arkansas. It appears that several of the companies that composed the new "30 Day Volunteer" regiment originated as part of the 25th Militia Regiment:

- Company A – Capt. A. G. Kelsey — Randolph and Lawrence counties. This company was presumably organized in Randolph county, Arkansas, by Captain A. G. Kelsey. The company enlisted for 30 days on November 18, 1861, and was discharged on December 18, 1861, at Camp Borland, near Pocahontas, Arkansas. This company's records are in the poorest shape of any of the companies of the regiment. The orderly sergeant had extremely poor handwriting and in most cases entered only initials in lieu of first names. This makes it difficult to verify the identities of most of the men; however, those who can be identified seem to be mostly from Randolph and neighboring Lawrence counties. It must have been a local company, because no authorization was made for payment of transportation to their homes. Endorsement on Company A muster roll—"Muster Roll of Capt. A. G. Kelsey's Co. of Volunteer Infantry, raised in response to Col. Borland's call of Nov. 5; mustered into the Confederate service Nov. 18 for 30 days, and discharged Dec. 18, 1861; entitled to pay from date of muster to the time set opposite their respective names and to transportation and subsistence from Pocahontas to —, Ark., — miles."
- Company B – Capt. John W. Peter — Sharp, Independence and Izard counties. This company was organized at Mount Tabor Church, Lawrence (now Sharp) county, Arkansas, by Captain John W. Peter. The company enlisted for 30 days on November 19, 1861, and was discharged on December 18, 1861, at Camp Borland, near Pocahontas, Arkansas. Most of these men were landowners in what is now Sharp county, with a sizeable number from Independence and Izard counties. Some of them subsequently enlisted in the 27th and 38th Arkansas Infantry Regiments. Endorsement on Company B muster roll—"Muster Roll of Capt. John W. Peter's Co. of Volunteer Infantry, raised in response to Col. Borland's call of Nov. 5; mustered into the Confederate service Nov. 19 for 30 days, and discharged Dec. 18, 1861; entitled to pay from date of muster to the time set opposite their respective names and to transportation and subsistence from Pocahontas to Mt. Tabor Church, Arkansas, 53 miles."
- Company C – Capt. M. Shelby Kennard — Independence county. This company was organized at Batesville, Independence county, Arkansas, by Captain M. Shelby Kennard. The company enlisted for 30 days on November 19, 1861, and was discharged on December 19, 1861, at Camp Borland, near Pocahontas, Arkansas. Most of these men were from Independence county. Some of them subsequently enlisted in the 27th and 38th Arkansas Infantry and 5th Arkansas Cavalry. Endorsement on Company C muster roll—"Muster Roll of Capt. M. Shelby Kennard's Co. of Volunteer Infantry, raised in response to Col. Borland's call of Nov. 5; mustered into the Confederate service Nov. 19 for 30 days, and discharged Dec. 19, 1861; entitled to pay from date of muster to the time set opposite their respective names and to transportation and subsistence from Pocahontas to Batesville, Arkansas, 60 miles."
- Company D – Capt. Thomas S. Simington — Randolph county. This company was organized at Pocahontas, Randolph county, Arkansas, by Captain Thomas S. Simington. The company enlisted for 30 days on November 15, 1861, and was discharged on December 15, 1861, at Camp Borland, near Pocahontas, Arkansas. Most of these men were from Randolph county. Being a local company, they were not entitled to transportation back to their homes. Some of them subsequently enlisted in the 25th and 38th Arkansas Infantry Regiments. Endorsement on Company B muster roll—"Muster Roll of Capt. Thos. S. Simington's Co. of Inf. Vols, raised in response to Col. Borland's call of Nov. 5; mustered into the Confederate service Nov. 15 for 30 days, and discharged Dec. 15, 1861; entitled to pay from date of muster to the time set opposite their respective names and to transportation and subsistence from Pocahontas to —, Ark., — miles."
- Company E – Capt. Joshua Wann — Lawrence (present day Sharp) county. This company was organized in Scott township, Lawrence (now Sharp) county, Arkansas, by Captain Joshua Wann. The company enlisted for 30 days on November 19, 1861, and was discharged on December 19, 1861, at Camp Borland, near Pocahontas, Arkansas. Most of these men were landowners in what is now Sharp county, and many of them subsequently enlisted in Co. B, 38th Arkansas Infantry Regiment. Endorsement on Company E muster roll—"Muster Roll of Capt. Joshua Wann's Co. of Vol. Inf., raised in response to Col. Borland's call of Nov. 5; mustered into the Confederate service Nov. 19 for 30 days, and discharged Dec. 19, 1861; entitled to pay from date of muster to the time set opposite their respective names and to transportation and subsistence from Pocahontas to Scott Township, Lawrence County, Arkansas, 50 miles."
- Company F – Capt. Israel Milligan — Lawrence (present day Sharp) and Izard counties. This company was organized in Lawrence (now Sharp) and Izard counties, Arkansas, by Captain Israel Milligan. The company enlisted for 30 days on November 20, 1861, and was discharged on December 20, 1861, at Camp Borland, near Pocahontas, Arkansas. About half of these men were from what is now Sharp county, and about half from Izard county. The Sharp county men were furnished transportation back to "Calunaile,". The Izard county men were furnished transportation back to Lunenburg. Many of these men subsequently enlisted in the 27th and 38th Arkansas Infantry Regiments. Endorsement on Company F muster roll—"Muster Roll of Capt. Israel Milligan's Co. of Inf. Vols, raised in response to Col. Borland's call of Nov. 5; mustered into the Confederate service Nov. 20 for 30 days, and discharged Dec. 20, 1861; entitled to pay from date of muster to the time set opposite their respective names and to transportation and subsistence from Pocahontas to Calunaile, Lawrence County, Ark., 50 miles, for 34 men, and to Lunenburg, Izard County, 75 miles, for 20 men."
- Company G – Capt. Daniel Yeager — Lawrence (present day Sharp) county. This company was organized at Evening Shade, Lawrence (now Sharp) county, Arkansas, by Captain Daniel Yeager. The company enlisted for 30 days on November 15, 1861, and was discharged on December 15, 1861, at Camp Borland, near Pocahontas, Arkansas. Most of these men were landowners in what is now Sharp county, and many of them subsequently enlisted in Co. F, 38th Arkansas Infantry Regiment. Endorsement on Company G muster roll—"Muster Roll of Capt. Daniel Yeager's Co. of Vol. Inf., raised in response to Col. Borland's call of Nov. 5; mustered into the Confederate service Nov. 15 for 30 days, and discharged Dec. 15, 1861; entitled to pay from date of muster to the time set opposite their respective names and to transportation and subsistence from Pocahontas to Evening Shade, Ark., 50 miles."
- Company H – Capt. James Campbell Anderson — Greene (and present day Clay) counties. This company was organized at Gainesville, Greene county, Arkansas, by Captain James C. Anderson. The company enlisted for 30 days on November 10, 1861, and was discharged on December 9, 1861, at Camp Borland, near Pocahontas, Arkansas. Most of these men were from Greene county. Many of them subsequently enlisted in the various battalions and regiments organized in and around Greene county. Endorsement on Company H muster roll—"Muster Roll of Capt. Anderson's Co. Infantry, raised in response to Col. Borland's call of Nov. 5; mustered into the Confederate service Nov. 10 for 30 days, and discharged Dec. 9, 1861; entitled to pay from date of muster to the time set opposite their respective names and to transportation and subsistence from Pocahontas to Gainesville, Ark., 30 miles."
- Company I – Capt. Beverly B. Owens — Independence county. This company was organized in Barren township, Independence county, Arkansas, by Captain Beverly B. Owens. The company enlisted for 30 days on November 19, 1861, and was discharged on December 19, 1861, at Camp Borland, near Pocahontas, Arkansas. Most of these men were from Independence county. Many of them subsequently enlisted in Cos. I and K, 38th Arkansas Infantry. Endorsement on Company I muster roll—"Muster Roll of Capt. B. B. Owens' Co. of Vol. Inf., raised in response to Col. Borland's call of Nov. 5; mustered into the Confederate service Nov. 19 for 30 days, and discharged Dec. 19, 1861; entitled to pay from date of muster to the time set opposite their respective names and to transportation and subsistence from Pocahontas to Barren Township, Independence County, Ark., 60 miles."
- Company K – Capt. Lazerus W. Robertson — Lawrence (and present day Sharp) counties. This company was organized at Smithville, Lawrence county, Arkansas, by Captain L. W. Robertson. The company enlisted for 30 days on November 17, 1861, and was discharged on December 17, 1861, at Camp Borland, near Pocahontas, Arkansas. Most of these men were from Lawrence county and present-day Sharp county. Many of them subsequently enlisted in the 25th and 38th Arkansas Infantry Regiments. Endorsement on Company K muster roll—"Muster Roll of Capt. L. W. Robertson's Co. of Vol. Inf., raised in response to Col. Borland's call of Nov. 5; mustered into the Confederate service Nov. 17 for 30 days, and discharged Dec. 17, 1861; entitled to pay from date of muster to the time set opposite their respective names and to transportation and subsistence from Pocahontas to Smithville, Ark., — miles."

Field and staff officer appointments were dated November 23, 1861. The following regimental staff was elected for the unit:

- Colonel James Haywood McCaleb,
- Lieutenant-Colonel David G Ligon, (elected from Co. K.)
- Major John P. Black, (elected from Co. A)
- First Lieutenant and Adjutant S. W. Temple, (appointed from Co. E.)
- Quartermaster Elisha Baxter, (elected governor of Arkansas in 1872.)
- Commissary Hiram A. Kelsey, (appointed from Co. A.)
- Surgeon H. W. Vaughs,
- Sergeant-Major T. A. Baxter,
- Drum Major James J. Vest, (appointed from Co. G.)
- Wagonmaster Simon Peter Hurn,(appointed from Co. D.)
- Assistant Wagonmaster James Johnston,

== Background ==
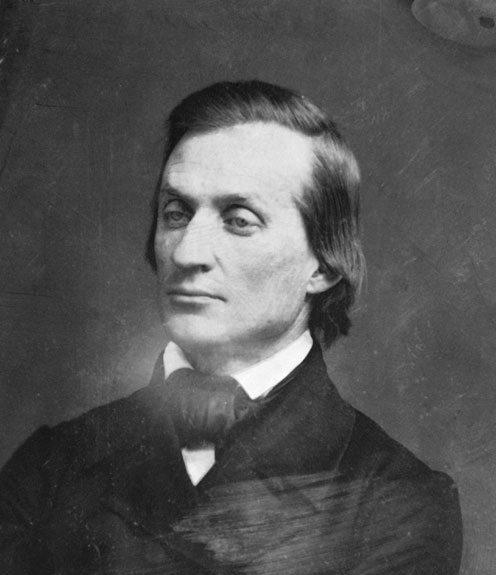
Solon F. Borland served in the Arkansas Regiment of Mounted Volunteers during the Mexican War; he served as the Adjutant General and a United States Senator before the Civil War

In May 1861, Pocahontas and the nearby strategically important Pitman's Ferry, in Randolph County, became an important Confederate military depot. Following the transfer of the State Troop regiments to Brig. Gen Hardee, virtually all the regiments stationed in northeast Arkansas were transferred in late September east of the Mississippi River to Bowling Green, Kentucky. Col. Solon Borland was left in command of a small force at Pitman's Ferry. Col. Borland's force was the only defense left in Northeast Arkansas. The forces included: Borland's own cavalry regiment of seven companies, Col. McCown's five companies of infantry, Maj. Desha's four companies of raw troops, Capt. Robert's artillery unit of 60 men but no guns and about 150 recruits brought by Maj. McCray – altogether about 1,286 men. But of these, owing to sickness and casualties Col Borland said he could count on no more than 600 for fighting service, and all were "raw, inexperienced, poorly disciplined and indifferently armed."

A second round of recruiting for new regiments was just getting underway when Col. Borland began receiving reports of enemy movements in Missouri. The initial reports seemed to indicate a possible movement on Pitman's Ferry. The Union army was massing troops in southeast Missouri mainly for the purpose of a thrust down the Mississippi River. But this posed a very real threat to all areas of northeast Arkansas. Col Borland indicated that he had reliable information "that there are 300 infantry and 150 cavalry at Rives' Station, on Black River, 35 miles (56 km) north of Pitman's Ferry Also that there is a strong infantry force-7,000-at Greenville, 15 miles (24 km) north of Rives' Station." Borland was maintaining a regular correspondence with Brig Gen. M. Jeff Thompson, of the Missouri State Guard, who commanded the First Military District of Missouri at Bloomfield, Missouri.

Reports of these Union troop movements were sent to area militia units. The Jacksonport Herald of October 26, 1861, published a communication received by Christopher W. Board, Commander of the 34th Militia Regiment of Jackson County.

23 Oct.1861

Col. Board

. . . We have commenced taking steps to call out the militia but will not call them out unless there is certainty a necessity for it. It might be well for your officers to take such steps as will enable prompt action in case of necessity. I send it to you, believing that you can have the proper persons ready for action; and at the same time keep down all unnecessary excitement . . .

J.C. Marvin.

Col. Borland moved his command from Pitman's Ferry to Pocahontas and was sufficiently alarmed over the reports to issue a call for reinforcements from the militia. On November 5, 1861, Col. Borland issued an appeal for volunteers in the surrounding counties to hastily organize companies for the defense of Pitman's Ferry until new regular Confederate regiments could be organized and dispatched.

When news of Borland's situation reached Little Rock, the state Military Board responded to Borland's call for aid by calling out the 8th Militia Brigade under the command of Brig. Gen. Phillips:

It being represented that the State was in danger of invasion, and that Colonel Borland's command was threatened with immediate attack, it was ordered that Brigadier-General Phillips be ordered to call out the Eighth Brigade of Militia, and that he also order out one company each from the following counties, viz: Prairie, Monroe, Poinsett, Saint Francis, and Craighead.

Brig. Gen. Theodore H. Phillips offered his services to Col. Borland, who welcomed his aid in the emergency. Phillips undertook the organization of the new 30 day volunteer companies into a brigade. He placed a requisition for camp equipment as follows:"

Requisition for Camp and Garrison Equipage viz: Four camp kettles. 4 ovens, lids and pot hooks, 4 coffee boilers, 15 tin cups. 25 tin plates. 4 mess Bins, 1 coffee mill, 6 spoons, 8 knives. Requisition for forage for 8 horses, 96 pounds (44 kg) of corn.

Brig. Gen Phillips added his explanation for the requisition: "In response to Col. Borland's call for militia service for 30 days. We have responded and entered service. [with] Capt. Ruffner." The receipt was dated Pocahontas November 23. 1861, and was signed by "T. H. Phillips, Brig. Gen. 8th Brigade of Arkansas Militia."

Col. Borland's call received an almost immediate response, but he continued to harbor serious misgivings about his situation. On November 10, he wrote to Maj. Gen. Leonidas Polk, C.S.A., commanding the 1st Division Western Department, at Columbus, Kentucky, and told of his call for reinforcements from the militia. He said the response was "somewhat tumultuous." On November 9, 1,000 men had arrived unorganized and so ill-supplied with arms that be deemed it best to direct them to return home. They followed this direction and assured Borland that within a week's time he would have at least 3,000 men at his command. He told them that companies thus organized and prepared would be received into service for 30 days from the time they reported again to him. Borland added a postscript to this letter, saying that he had just received a report from his scouts that a Federal force of 7,450 was between Reeve's Station and Greenville in Missouri. He told Gen. Polk that the force he had was wholly insufficient for either attack or defense. It should be three times as large or be abandoned altogether; and finally he asked to be relieved of his command. "It is a Brigadier's command, and should have his responsibility, which I am daily growing more and more distrustful of my competency to sustain. Public interests here would be better provided for by other and abler hands."

News of Borland's call for volunteers and the resulting convergence upon Pocahontas was of course reported to other parts of the state. The Arkansas True Democrat of November 14 printed a dispatch from Des Arc dated November 9, 11:00pm:

The steamer Kanawa Valley left Jacksonport this morning and reports here that large numbers of men are flocking to Bor1ands aid. The Federal forces 7,000 strong are advancing on Pocahontas rapidly, and were expected to make an attack on the town to-day. There is a tremendous excitement throughout the country. The women and children are all being moved from Pocahontas and active preparations are making for a stern resistance to the invaders. Borland's command has retreated from Pittman's Ferry to within a mile of Pocahontas, where they have made a stand. This intelligence is perfectly reliable.

— J.C. Morrill.

Some two dozen of these emergency companies were organized in Greene, Independence, Izard, Jackson, Lawrence and Randolph counties, including the areas now encompassed in present-day Clay, Cleburne, Sharp and Woodruff counties. They converged on Pocahontas and Pitman's Ferry, beginning about November 9, and were mustered into Confederate service for a period of thirty days. Few records of these hastily organized and short-lived companies have survived.

== See also ==
- List of Confederate units from Arkansas
- Confederate Units by State
