= List of Confederate units from Arkansas =

This is a list of Confederate units from Arkansas, or military units from the state of Arkansas which fought for the Confederacy in the American Civil War. The list of Union units is shown separately.

Like most states, Arkansas possessed a prewar Militia organization, which consisted of seventy one regiments, organized into eight brigades, and divided into two divisions. In addition to its standard militia regiment or regiments, each county was authorized to create up to four Volunteer Militia Companies. While none of the prewar militia regiments were enrolled into Confederate service, many of the existing Volunteer Militia Companies were enrolled into new volunteer regiments. Other new Volunteer Companies were raised with no connection to the prewar militia. Immediately following secession, the State Military Board began organizing regiments of State Troops. Many of these regiments were eventually transferred into Confederate Service. Some Volunteer Regiments were organized under direct authority of the new Confederate Government and were never organized as State Troops. In April 1862, the Confederate Congress passed a conscription law and new companies and regiments were organized almost entirely of conscripted (drafted) men. Volunteers usually went into already existing units. The secession convention also authorized each county to organize Home Guard units made up of men too young or too old or otherwise exempt from conscription or militia service.

== Militia ==
At the beginning of the war, the Arkansas Militia consisted of 71 Regiments, which were organized into two divisions, each division made up of four brigades. Every county had at least one regiment, and several had more than one. The Arkansas Militia Act allowed each regiment to form up to four volunteer companies. While the regular militia regiments were required to drill three times per year and were required to supply their own weapons, the volunteer companies drilled much more often and were supplied with equipment by the state.

Only one Militia Regiment, the 45th Arkansas Militia Regiment of Searcy County, was mobilized for service during the war. In the fall of 1861, Governor Rector called up the 45th Militia Regiment to deal with a potential threat to the Confederate government from the anti-war "peace societies". The militiamen arrested suspects in the Ozark Mountains of northwest Arkansas, and many of them were forced to enlist in 18th Arkansas Infantry Regiment.

Governor Rector ordered Colonel Solon F. Borland to form a provisional battalion of militia in Pulaski County in April 1862 for the purpose of seizing the federal installation at Fort Smith, Borland's Arkansas Infantry Battalion consisted of three volunteer infantry companies and a volunteer artillery battery from the 13th Arkansas Militia Regiment. Borland's Battalion marched on Fort Smith, only to discover the military post had been abandoned by Federal Troops the day before. One company remained to guard the post, and the rest returned to Pulaski County, where they became part of volunteer regiments.

A decision was made by the state Arkansas Secession Convention not to activate the militia in mass, but form a series of new State Troop regiments for the new Army of Arkansas. Many of these volunteer militia companies were enrolled in the new volunteer regiments which were formed by the Military Board of Arkansas.

== State Troops ==
=== Provisional Army of Arkansas ===
The Arkansas Succession Convention decided that rather than activating the existing militia regiments, they would raise new volunteer regiments. The convention was concerned that if the militia was called out and transferred into Confederate Service, they would be subject to being transferred out of the state, leaving the state defenseless. The convention was also concerned with the cost involved in paying for a large standing state force. These new volunteer regiments would be a part of the Provisional Army of Arkansas and would be transitioned into Confederate service as quickly as possible. The Provisional Army of Arkansas was to consist of two divisions, the 1st Division in the western part of the state, and the 2nd Division in the eastern part of the state. The new regiments of State Troops were mustered into service for 90 days. The regiments in the eastern division were transferred into Confederate Service under the command of Brigadier General Hardee. The regiments in the western division participated in the Battle of Wilson's Creek as a brigade under State Brigadier General N.B. Pearce. Following the battle of Wilson's Creek, the western division was marched back to Arkansas and given the opportunity to vote on whether or not they would be transferred into Confederate Service. The units of the western division voted to disband rather than transfer into Confederate service. The Secession Convention appointed a new state military board to organize the new regiments and coordinate their transition into Confederate service.

=== Left to its own defenses ===
In the Spring of 1862, the state again attempted to gather its own force of State Troops. General Van Dorn had been ordered to take his Army of the West, east of the Mississippi River in order to support Confederate efforts in western Tennessee that would ultimately lead to the Battle of Shiloh and the Corinth Campaign. The State Military Board authorized the establishment of several new regiments for the defense of the State, and ordered the conscription of the requisite number of men from the militia to fill the ranks. The new regiments were organized fairly quickly, and were mustered into service in June, July and August 1862. They were mustered into service as the 1st (Rector), 2nd (Brooks) and 3rd (Peel) Regiments, Northwest Division, District of Arkansas. Colonel Peel was eventually superseded by Charles W. Adams, resulting in what is known as 3rd Regiment, Arkansas State Troops (Adams'), which, was disbanded after breaking under fire during the Battle of Prairie Grove. The 1st and 2nd Regiments, Northwest Division, finally assumed their authorized designations of 35th (Rector) and 34th (Brooks) Arkansas Regiments, respectively.

=== The last-ditch recruiting effort ===
Following the fall of Little Rock to Union Forces in September 1863, the State of Arkansas was again forced to raise units of State Troops in order to provide for its own defense. Governor Harris Flanagin (who had defeated Governor Rector in his re-election bid of 1862) issued a proclamation on August 10, 1863, just a month before the capitol fell, announcing that he had been authorized to raise new regiments of state troops and that by special agreement these new units could not be transferred out of the state by Confederate authorities. After the fall of Little Rock, recruiting was far more difficult than it had been in the first years of the war. The constant transfer of Arkansas troops into the eastern theater of the war, across the Mississippi River from their homes, was a major objection by the remaining population of men eligible for military service. With Federal forces now occupying the state capitol, the Confederate state government had no way of enforcing conscription laws in the counties behind the Union lines, except during raids by Generals Price and Shelby in 1864. The remaining Confederate regiments were plagued by desertions.

On September 16, 1863, Governor Fagan issued General Order No. 6 from Arkadelphia, which called into service the militia regiments of the counties of Clark, Hempstead, Sevier, Pike, Polk, Montgomery, La Fayette, Ouachita, Union, and Columbia in order to resist the Federal army. The Governor's order directed the regiments to march to Arkadelphia at the earliest possible day. Companies were to be mounted and commanders were to compel persons evading the call to come to the rendezvous. The intent was to form companies of twelve-month mounted volunteers. In describing this call in a letter to General Holmes dated October 18, 1863, from Washington, Arkansas, the new Confederate state capitol, Flanagin stated that he issued the order calling out the militia, as an experiment, expecting to get volunteers. The order succeeded in getting companies organized in the counties where the call for the militia was enforced which resulted in seven companies being collected under the call. Flanagin also stated that "the troops raised by the State are more than double all the troops raised by volunteering, or by the conscript law, within the past few months".

These new units of Arkansas State Troops were placed under the overall command of Col. William H. Trader who was detailed to Governor Flanagin by General E. Kirby Smith. Col. Trader remained in command of the state troops until he resigned in June 1864.

On January 14, 1864, Governor Flanagin, through General Peay, issued General Orders, No. 8. which directed that certain named companies of Arkansas mounted volunteers, which had been called into the service of the State under the proclamation of the August 10, 1863, be designated as the 1st Battalion, Arkansas State Troops, more often referred to as Pettus's Battalion Arkansas State Troops. The unit participated in the battle of Marks Mill on April 25, 1864, as a part of Brigadier General William L. Cabell's Brigade. Lieutenant Colonel Pettus was killed during the battle and Captain P.K. Williamson of Company A commanded the battalion until the unit was increased to a regiment and transferred to Confederate service.

In August 1864 when the term of enlistment for these state troops was about to expire, Adjutant General Peay issued an order which directed that companies be allowed to vote on the subject of being transferred into Confederate service. On September 5, 1864, the State Troop companies, including Pettus's Battalion, were formed into one regiment of cavalry to be designated as the 3rd Regiment of Arkansas State Cavalry, with Col. Robert C. Newton assigned to the command of the regiment until an election could be held for field officers. This unit was mustered into the Confederate Service on the October 31, 1864 as the 10th Arkansas Cavalry Regiment (Newton's), and Col. Newton was elected regimental commander.

=== List of Arkansas State Troop units ===
Unit	Commander	Alternate Designation	Final Designation
1st Regiment, Arkansas State Troops	Colonel Patrick R. Cleburne	1st Arkansas Volunteer Infantry	15th (Josey's) Arkansas Volunteer Infantry
3rd Regiment, Arkansas State Troops	Colonel John R. Gratiot	2nd Regiment, Arkansas State Troops "Gratiot's Regiment"	Disbanded following Battle of Wilson's Creek
4th Regiment, Arkansas State Troops	Colonel J. D. Walker	"Walker's Regiment"	Disbanded following Battle of Wilson's Creek
5th Regiment, Arkansas State Troops	Colonel Thomas P. Dockery	"Dockery's Regiment"	Disbanded following Battle of Wilson's Creek
5th Regiment, Arkansas State Troops (Cross)	Colonel David C. Cross	Fighting Fifth	5th Arkansas Volunteer Infantry
6th Regiment, Arkansas State Troops	Colonel Richard Lyon		6th Arkansas Volunteer Infantry
7th Regiment, Arkansas State Troops	Colonel Robert G. Shaver	Bloody Seventh	7th Arkansas Volunteer Infantry
8th Regiment, Arkansas State Troops	Colonel William K. Patterson		8th Arkansas Volunteer Infantry
1st Cavalry Regiment, Arkansas State Troops	Colonel DeRosey Carroll	Carroll's Regiment	Disbanded following Battle of Wilson's Creek
Helena Artillery	Captain A. W. Clarkson Captain John H. Calvert Captain Thomas J. Key	Key's Battery Clarkson's Battery,	Company C, 20th Alabama Light Artillery Battalion Company H, 28th Georgia Artillery Battalion
Jackson Light Artillery	Captain James G. Thrall Captain George W. McCown Captain George T. Hubbard	Thrall's Battery McCown's Battery	3rd Arkansas Light Artillery
Pulaski Light Artillery	Captain Robert C. Newton Captain William Edward Woodruff, Jr.	Woodruff's Battery Weaver Light Artillery 3rd Arkansas Field Battery	Disbanded following Battle of Wilson's Creek Reformed later as the Weaver Light Artillery
Fort Smith Artillery	Captain John G. Reid	Ried's Battery	Disbanded following Battle of Wilson's Creek
"Clark County Light Artillery"	Captain Frank Roberts	Wiggins Arkansas Battery Robert's Arkansas Battery	2nd Arkansas Light Artillery
1st Regiment, Northwest Division	Colonel Frank Rector	Rector's War Regiment	35th Arkansas Infantry Regiment
2nd Regiment, Northwest Division	Colonel William H. Brooks		34th Arkansas Infantry Regiment
3rd Regiment, Northwest Division	Colonel Charles W. Adams	Adams's Arkansas Infantry Regiment	Disbanded following Battle of Prairie Grove
1st Battalion, Arkansas State Troops	Colonel William H. Trader Lieutenant Colonel Allen T. Pettus Colonel Robert C. Newton	Trader's Battalion Arkansas State Troops Pettus's Battalion Arkansas State Troops 3rd Regiment of Arkansas State Cavalry	10th Arkansas Cavalry Regiment (Newton's)
2nd Battalion, Arkansas State Troops	Lieutenant Colonel John Crowell Wright	Wright's Battalion Wright's Cavalry	12th Arkansas Cavalry Regiment

== Confederate Forces raised in Arkansas ==
=== Infantry ===
Tracking Arkansas Confederate infantry regiments can be extremely complicated due to the fact that numerical designations were often issued to multiple units. Some of these duplications were due to the competing authorities attempting to organize forces in the state. Other duplications were due to poor and or delayed communications between the various mustering agents, the Arkansas State Military Board, which was in charge of organizing forces within the state, and the Confederate War Department in Richmond. Additional duplications occurred when parts of various regiments were captured, only to be paroled, exchanged and returned to active status at some later point. Finally, much duplication occurred after effective communications had been severed between Richmond and the Department of the Trans-Mississippi. at one point, General Hindman began designating new units organized in Arkansas as Trans-Mississippi Rifle Regiments, which resulted in many regiments serving west of the Mississippi having duplicate designations with units serving east of the Mississippi River.

==== Competing Authorities ====
An example of the confusion caused by the competing authorities organizing forces is the numbers of the regiment organized by Colonel, later Major General, Patrick Cleburne. Cleburne's regiment received the designation of 1st Arkansas when it was mustered into state service at Mound City on May 14, 1861. Cleburne's regiment was accepted into Confederate service by General Hardee on July 23, 1861, at Pitman's Ferry, Arkansas as the 1st Arkansas Volunteer Infantry. However Confederate authorities had authorized Colonel T. B. Flournoy to raise a regiment of Arkansas Volunteers in April 1861, before the state had actually seceded. The regiment raised by Flournoy, which elected James F. Fagan as its original colonel, was never mustered into State Service, so it never received a state designation. When Cleburne's regiment's documents reached the war department, the duplication was discovered and Cleburne's regiment was re-designated as the 15th Arkansas. Unfortunately there would be two other regiments which were also numbered the 15th Arkansas, one commanded by Colonel Dandrige McRea and another commanded by Colonel James Gee.

Additionally, at various times during the war, the State Military Board attempted to organized State Troop organizations, which were not intended to be transferred to Confederate Service. Most of these regiments were eventually transferred into Confederate service but they existed, often with duplicated state number designations for some period of time as state organizations. An example of this confusion involves the 3rd Arkansas Infantry Regiment and Adams Arkansas Infantry Regiment. After the battle of Pea Ridge, General Van Dorn took most of the organized regiments in the state, and all military supplies that he could lay hand on and moved them across the Mississippi River to Corinth, Mississippi, leaving the state basically defenseless. The State Military Board authorized the establishment of several new regiments for the defense of the State, and ordered the conscription of the requisite number of men from the militia to fill the ranks. The new regiments were organized fairly quickly, and were mustered into service in June, July and August 1862. Among the newly organized regiments authorized by the State Military Board were the 34th (Col. William H. Brooks), 35th (Col. Frank A. Rector) and 36th (Col. Samuel W. Peel). True to form, these designations were ignored, and they were mustered into service as the 1st (Rector), 2nd (Brooks) and 3rd (Peel) Regiments, Northwest Division, District of Arkansas. Colonel Peel was eventually superseded by Charles W. Adams, resulting in what is known as Adam's 3rd Arkansas Infantry, which, was disbanded after the Battle of Prairie Grove. The 1st and 2nd Regiments, Northwest Division, finally assumed their authorized designations of 35th and 34th Arkansas Regiments, respectively. To further confuse matters, when the United States War Department clerks who put together the Compiled Service Records, decades after the war, ran across scattered records of certain men of the 3rd Arkansas who had been paroled at Springfield, Missouri, after the battle of Prairie Grove, they compiled them with the records of Colonel Van H. Manning's 3rd Arkansas Volunteer Infantry Regiment. In fact, these men belonged to Adams's so-called 3rd Arkansas.

==== Confusing Communications ====
Communications with the Confederate War Department also led to much confusion. When a new regiment was organized, state officials issued the next available number under its numbering scheme. Before a new unit obtained its final or Confederate designation, the regimental muster rolls and election returns had to be forwarded to the Confederate War Department which would assign the next available number, according to its numbering scheme. Given the great distance involved, even before Union forces established effective control of the Mississippi River, many duplications occurred. When a duplication was identified, the Confederate War Department would attempt to renumber a regiment to relieve the confusion, but often only confused the issue further. A good example of this type of duplication is the regiment organized by Dandridge McRea. McRea's unit was originally designated as the 3rd Arkansas Infantry Battalion, because it lacked the required number of companies to organize as a full regiment. By the time sufficient companies were added to bring the unit up to regimental strength, the unit was designated as the 21st Arkansas Infantry Regiment. However, Confederate authorities realized that they had also accepted Colonel Jordan E. Cravens regiment as the 21st Arkansas. To rectify the confusion, the Confederate War Department redesignated McRea's Regiment as the 15th Arkansas Infantry Regiment. Almost immediately, the Confederate War Department realized that it had just awarded this designation to Cleburne's former 1st Arkansas, so McRea's Regiment was redesignated as the 15th (Northwest) Arkansas Infantry Regiment.

==== Designations affected by surrender, parole and exchange ====
The designations of some units became conflicted as parts of units were captured and later paroled, exchanged, and re-entered active service. An example of this is Dawson's 19th Arkansas Infantry. The regiment completed its organization at Nashville, Arkansas, in November 1861 and Charles L. Dawson was elected colonel. The unit was assigned to the garrison of Fort Hindman at Arkansas Post, where a large part of the regiment was captured when the fort was surrendered on January 11, 1863. Some of the men, including the regimental commander, Colonel Dawson, were absent from Arkansas Post at the time it surrendered. This remnant of the 19th was consolidated with similar remnants of other units captured at the post, and with Colonel Dawson, in command, they were referred to as the 19th/24th Consolidated Arkansas, sometimes being referred to as Hardy's Regiment (who succeeded Dawson in command), and operated in the Trans-Mississippi department for the remainder of the war. The part of Dawson's original regiment that was captured at Arkansas Post, were sent to prisons in the North, and when exchanged in April 1863 at City Point, Virginia, and then transferred to the Army of Tennessee, where they spent the rest of the war, also being referred to as the 19th Arkansas. There was also a third regiment that was given the designation of 19th Arkansas. This regiment was organized on April 2, 1862, at DeValls Bluff, with Col. Hamilton P. Smead in command. Smead was eventually replaced by Colonel Thomas P. Dockery, and surrendered with the garrison of Vicksburg Mississippi.

==== Re-organization of the Trans-Mississippi Department ====
In May 1862, Major General Hindman assumed command of the Trans-Mississippi and found that the state had been stripped of organized Confederate forces when Major General Van Dorn moved his Army of the West, east of the Mississippi River. In order to organize a new Confederate Army in Arkansas, Hindman utilized the Confederate Conscription act of April 1862. This act actually specifically forbid the use of conscription to raise to units. It had been intended to create a pool of replacements for the regiments which were already in Confederate service but had been depleted by disease and battle filed losses. With no organized regiments in Arkansas, Hindman was forced to create new units. He designated several of his new units as Trans-Mississippi Rifle Regiments. Col. Asa S. Morgan's 26th Arkansas Regiment was designated as the 3rd Trans-Mississippi Regiment. Immediately the officers and men begin to refer to themselves as the 3rd Arkansas Regiment. This leads to confusion for researchers who find Col. Van H. Manning's 3rd Arkansas Volunteer Infantry serving under General Lee in the Army of Northern Virginia and a group in Arkansas who insist on also calling themselves the 3rd Arkansas. General Hindman's reason for the use of this designation isn't clear. It may have been a way of emphasizing that these units were for use west of the Mississippi River in the new Department of the Trans-Mississippi, or it may be related to his dispute with Governor Rector over Rector's plan to raise new regiments of State Troops instead of enrolling new units in Confederate service. It may also have to do with the fact that several of these new units at least initially contained companies of men from Missouri and Texas who were in Arkansas when the organization began.

==== Consolidated units ====
As Confederate units lost access to the geographical area's that they were organized in, they lost any ability to recruit replacements for their battlefield and non battlefield losses. This was particularly true of the regiments that found themselves isolated east of the Mississippi River after the fall of Vicksburg in 1863. As the regiments continued to dwindle in size, it became necessary to combine or consolidate units in order to eliminate unnecessary, redundant command and staff positions and field units at or near full strength. Most of these consolidations were considered "field consolidations" which were intended to be temporary organizations, until recruits could be obtained. Attempts were made to maintain the separate identity of the original regiments in these temporary or field consolidations. Later as the manpower shortage became more extreme, it became necessary to make these consolidations permanent. In the Department of the Trans-Mississippi, these permanent consolidations began in 1864, resulting in the 1st, 2nd and 3rd Arkansas Consolidated Infantry Regiments. In the Army of Tennessee these permanent consolidations did not occur until the final month of the war, resulting in the 1st Consolidated Arkansas Infantry and the 1st Consolidated Arkansas Mounted Rifles.

==== The 40 Series Regiments ====
The State Military Board assigned designators in the 40-series all the way up to the 48th Arkansas. The 40-series Arkansas infantry regiments are actually listed as cavalry regiments in most histories. The first four (40th, 41st, 42nd, 43rd) were assigned to the Arkansas regiments that were surrendered at the Sieges of Vicksburg and Port Hudson, when these regiments were reorganized in southern Arkansas following their parole and exchange. The 41st was assigned to the exchanged prisoners of the 20th Arkansas Infantry Regiment, the 42nd was assigned to the survivors of the 23rd Arkansas Infantry. The 40th and 43rd were assigned to either 15th (Northwest) or the 19th (Dockery's) Arkansas, but it is impossible to be sure which was which because of the illegibility of the original documents. All of these were assigned as mounted infantry designations, and all of them were ignored by the Confederate Army because the old designations continued to be used in the reports for their commanders. There are occasionally prisoner of war records that utilize the official designations.

The 44th through the 48th Arkansas infantry regiments were raised in the summer of 1864, were mounted in order to accompany Price's 1864 Missouri Expedition, which was planned as an all-cavalry affair. Rare references list them as mounted infantry, for example, 44th Arkansas Infantry (Mounted). However, they were almost always referred to as Cavalry units (for example 44th Arkansas Cavalry) when the numerical designation was used. Usually, however, they were simply designated by the name of the regiment's colonel, for example, McGehee's Arkansas Cavalry. These regiments were for the most part raised in northeast Arkansas, and seem to have consisted in large part of absentees from other regiments. The 45th Arkansas, for example, consisted largely of absentees from the 7th Arkansas and the 38th Arkansas Regiments.

==== List of Arkansas Confederate Regiments ====
Regiment	Muster Date	Commanders	Alternate Designations
1st Arkansas Infantry Regiment	May 6, 1861	Colonel James F. Fagan Colonel John W. Colquitt	1st Arkansas Consolidated Infantry
1st Arkansas 30 Day Volunteer Regiment	November 23, 1861	Colonel James Haywood McCaleb	None
1st Arkansas Consolidated Infantry	April 9, 1865	Colonel Edward Alexander Howell	1st Arkansas Infantry Regiment. 2nd Arkansas Infantry Regiment 5th Arkansas Infantry. 6th and 7th Arkansas Infantry. 8th Arkansas Infantry. 24th Arkansas Infantry. 13th Arkansas Infantry. 15th (Josey's) Arkansas Infantry. 19th (Dawsons's) Arkansas Infantry. 3rd Confederate Infantry.
1st Arkansas Consolidated Infantry (Trans-Mississippi)	May 17, 1864	Colonel Jordan E. Cravens	1st Arkansas Consolidated Infantry Regiment 14th Arkansas Infantry Regiment (Powers'), 15th (Northwest) Arkansas Infantry Regiment, 16th Arkansas Infantry Regiment, 21st Arkansas Infantry Regiment (Craven's)
2nd Arkansas Infantry Regiment	June 26, 1861	Colonel Thomas C. Hindman Lieutenant Colonel J. W. Bacoge Lieutenant Colonel Elbridge Brasher Colonel Daniel C. Govan Lieutenant Colonel E. Warfield	Hindman's Legion 1st Arkansas Consolidated Infantry
2nd Arkansas 30 Day Volunteer Regiment	November 18, 1861	Major Allen	None
2nd Arkansas Consolidated Infantry	May 17, 1864	Colonel T.J. Reid	12th Arkansas Infantry Regiment 18th Arkansas Infantry Regiment 23rd Arkansas Infantry Regiment 8th Arkansas Infantry Battalion 12th Arkansas Infantry Battalion
3rd Arkansas Infantry Regiment	July 5, 1861	Colonel Albert Rust Colonel Van. H. Manning Lieutenant Colonel Robert S. Taylor (acting)	None
3rd Arkansas Consolidated Infantry	May 17, 1864	Colonel H. G. P. Williams	15th (Gee/Johnson) Arkansas Infantry Regiment. 19th Arkansas Infantry Regiment, (Dockery's) 20th Arkansas Infantry Regiment.
4th Arkansas Infantry Regiment	August 17, 1861	Colonel Evander McNair, Colonel H. G. Bunn	Southwestern Arkansas Regiment 1st Arkansas Mounted Rifles (Consolidated)
5th Arkansas Infantry Regiment	June 28, 1861 (State Service) July 27, 1861 (Confederate Service)	Colonel David C. Cross, Colonel Lucius Featherston, Colonel Peter V. Green, Colonel John E. Murray	Fighting Fifth 1st Arkansas Consolidated Infantry
6th Arkansas Infantry Regiment	June 10, 1861 (State Service) July 26, 1861, (Confederate Service)	Colonel Richard Lyon Colonel Alexander T. Hawthorn Colonel G. S. Smith Major William F. Douglas Lieutenant Colonel Peter Snyder	6th Regiment, Arkansas State Troops 6th & 7th Arkansas Consolidated Infantry Regiment 1st Arkansas Consolidated Infantry
7th Arkansas Infantry Regiment	June 16, 1861 (State Service) July 26, 1861 (Confederate Service)	Colonel Robert G. Shaver Colonel D. A. Gillespie	"Bloody Seventh" 6th & 7th Arkansas Consolidated Infantry Regiment 1st Arkansas Consolidated Infantry
8th Arkansas Infantry Regiment	July 13, 1861 (State Service) September 10, 1861 (Confederate Service)	Colonel William K. Patterson Colonel George F. Baucum, Colonel John H. Kelly	8th/19th Consolidated Arkansas Infantry Regiments 1st Arkansas Consolidated Infantry
9th Arkansas Infantry Regiment	July 20, 1861	Colonel John M. Bradley, Colonel Isaac L. Dunlop	"Parson's Regiment" 1st Arkansas Mounted Rifles (Consolidated)
10th Arkansas Infantry Regiment	July 27, 1861	Colonel T. D. Merrick Colonel A. R. Witt	Witt's 10th Arkansas Cavalry
11th Arkansas Infantry Regiment	July 28, 1861, first election August 8, 1861, second election	Colonel Jabez M. Smith Colonel John L. Logan Colonel John Griffith	11th and 17th Consolidated Arkansas Infantry Regiment 11th Arkansas Cavalry Regiment
11th and 17th Consolidated Arkansas Infantry Regiment	March 1863	Colonel John L. Logan Colonel John Griffith	11th / 17th Arkansas Mounted Infantry
12th Arkansas Infantry Regiment	July 27, 1861	Colonel Edward W. Gantt Colonel T. J. Reid, Jr.	2nd Arkansas Consolidated Infantry Regiment
13th Arkansas Infantry Regiment	July 29, 1861	Colonel L. Featherston, Colonel James A. McNeely, Colonel John E. Murry, Colonel James C. Tappan	1st Arkansas Consolidated Infantry
14th Arkansas Infantry Regiment (McCarver's)	October 22, 1861	Colonel James H. McCarver	9th Battalion Arkansas Infantry 18th Battalion Arkansas Infantry 21st Arkansas Infantry Regiment (Craven's)
14th Arkansas Infantry Regiment (Powers')	July 1861	Colonel William C. Mitchell, Colonel Eli Dodson, Colonel Frank P. Powers	14th Arkansas Infantry Regiment 1st Arkansas Consolidated Infantry Regiment (Trans-Mississippi)
15th Arkansas Infantry Regiment (Johnson's)	January 2, 1862	Colonel James Gee Colonel Ben W. Johnson	15th (Gee/Johnson)Arkansas Infantry Regiment
15th Arkansas Infantry Regiment (Josey's)	May 14, 1861 (State Service) July 23, 1861 (Confederate Service)	Colonel Patrick R. Cleburne Lieutenant Colonel Archibald K. Patton Colonel Lucius E. Polk Colonel John E. Josey	1st Regiment, Arkansas State Troops 1st Consolidated Arkansas Infantry Regiment
15th Arkansas Infantry Regiment	July 15, 1861	Colonel Dandridge McRae Colonel James H. Hobbs Colonel Squire Boone	3rd Arkansas Infantry Battalion 21st (McRae's) Arkansas Infantry Regiment 1st Arkansas Consolidated Infantry Regiment (Trans-Mississippi)
16th Arkansas Infantry Regiment	December 4, 1861	Colonel John F. Hill Colonel David Provence	16th Arkansas Cavalry Regiment 1st Arkansas Consolidated Infantry Regiment (Trans-Mississippi)
17th Arkansas Infantry Regiment (Griffith's)	November 17, 1861	Colonel Frank Rector Colonel John L. Logan Colonel John Griffith	11th / 17th Arkansas Mounted Infantry 17th Arkansas Cavalry
17th Arkansas Infantry Regiment (Lemoyne's)	August 1, 1861	Colonel George W. Lemoyne Colonel Jordan E. Cravens	21st Arkansas Infantry Regiment 1st Arkansas Consolidated Infantry Regiment (Trans-Mississippi)
18th Arkansas Infantry Regiment	April 2, 1862	Colonel David W. Carroll Colonel John N. Daly Colonel Robert Hamilton Crockett Lieutenant Colonel William N. Parish	2nd Arkansas Consolidated Infantry Regiment 18th Arkansas Mounted Infantry
18th Arkansas Infantry Regiment	January 1, 1862	Colonel Thomas C. Hindman Colonel John S. Marmaduke	Hindman's Legion 1st Arkansas Infantry Battalion 3rd Confederate Infantry Regiment 1st Arkansas Consolidated Infantry
19th Arkansas Infantry Regiment (Dawson's)	November 21, 1861	Colonel C. L. Dawson Lieutenant Colonel Augustus S. Hutchinson	8th/19th Arkansas Infantry Regiment 1st Arkansas Consolidated Infantry
19th Arkansas Infantry Regiment (Dockery's)	April 2, 1862	Colonel Hamilton P. Smead Colonel Thomas P. Dockery Colonel William H. Dismukes Colonel Horatio Gates Perry Williamson	3rd Arkansas Consolidated Infantry Regiment 19th Arkansas Cavalry
19th and 24th Consolidated Arkansas Infantry Regiment	February 1863	Colonel Charles L. Dawson, Colonel William R. Hardy,	Hardy's 19th Arkansas Infantry Regiment Dawson's Arkansas Infantry Regiment Hardy's Arkansas Infantry Regiment 3rd Arkansas Consolidated Infantry Regiment
20th Arkansas Infantry Regiment	April 9, 1862	Colonel George King Colonel Henry P. Johnson Colonel James H. Fletcher Colonel Daniel W. Jones	22nd Arkansas Infantry 41st Arkansas Mounted Infantry 3rd Arkansas Consolidated Infantry Regiment
21st Arkansas Infantry Regiment	May 15, 1862	Colonel Jordan E. Cravens Colonel William G. Matheny	1st Arkansas Consolidated Infantry Regiment (Trans-Mississippi)
22nd Arkansas Infantry Regiment	July 11, 1862	Colonel Frank Rector Colonel James P. King Colonel Henry J. McCord	1st Arkansas Infantry, State Troops, 2nd Regiment, Northwest Division, District of Arkansas Rector's War Regiment 35th Arkansas Infantry Regiment
23rd Arkansas Infantry Regiment	September 10, 1862	Colonel Charles W. Adams Colonel O. P. Lyles Colonel Thomas J. Reid, Jr	2nd Arkansas Consolidated Infantry Regiment Lyle's Arkansas Cavalry
24th Arkansas Infantry Regiment	June 6, 1862	Colonel E. E. Portlock Colonel Augustus S. Hutchenson	Hardy's/Dawson's Infantry Regiment 19th/24th Consolidated Arkansas Infantry Regiment 2nd/15th/24th Consolidated Arkansas Infantry Regiment 2nd/24th Consolidated Arkansas Infantry Regiment 1st Arkansas Consolidated Infantry
25th Arkansas Infantry Regiment	June 13, 1862	Colonel Charles J. Turnbull	11th Battalion Arkansas Infantry 30th Arkansas Infantry Regiment 1st Arkansas Mounted Rifles (Consolidated)
26th Arkansas Infantry Regiment	July 23, 1862	Colonel Asa S. Morgan Colonel Fountain P. Yell Colonel Iverson L. Brooks	Morgan's Arkansas Infantry Battalion 3rd Trans-Mississippi Regiment
27th Arkansas Infantry Regiment	July 31, 1862	Colonel James R. Shaler Colonel Robert G. Shaver Colonel Beal Gaither Lieutenant Colonel James M. Riggs	None
28th Arkansas Infantry Regiment	July 19, 1862	Colonel Dandridge McRae	McRae's Emergency Regiment 2nd Trans-Mississippi Regiment
29th Arkansas Infantry Regiment	June 6, 1862	Colonel Joseph C. Pleasants	1st Trans-Mississippi Regiment 37th Arkansas Infantry Regiment
30th Arkansas Infantry Regiment	June 18, 1862	Colonel A. J. McNeill Colonel Robert A. Hart, Colonel James W. Rogan Lieutenant Colonel Iverson L. Brooks	5th Trans-Mississippi Regiment 39th Arkansas Infantry Regiment Rogan's Arkansas Cavalry
31st Arkansas Infantry Regiment	May 27, 1862	Colonel Thomas Hamilton McCray	1st Arkansas Mounted Rifles (Consolidated)
32nd Arkansas Infantry Regiment	August 6, 1862	Colonel Lucian C. Gause Colonel C. H. Matlock Lieutenant Colonel William Hicks	4th Trans-Mississippi Regiment
33rd Arkansas Infantry Regiment	July 11, 1862	Colonel H.L. Grinstead, Colonel Thomas D. Thomson	None
34th Arkansas Infantry Regiment	August 16, 1862	Colonel William H. Brooks	2nd Regiment, Northwest Division, District of Arkansas
35th Arkansas Infantry Regiment	July 11, 1862	Colonel Frank Rector Colonel James P. King Colonel Henry J. McCord	1st Arkansas Infantry, State Troops, 1st Regiment, Northwest Division, District of Arkansas Rector's War Regiment 22nd Arkansas Infantry Regiment
36th Arkansas Infantry Regiment	July 11, 1862, Redesignated January 1863	Colonel James M. Davie, Colonel John E. Glenn	28th Arkansas Infantry Regiment Davie's Arkansas Infantry
37th Arkansas Infantry Regiment	June 6, 1862	Joseph C. Pleasants Colonel Samuel S. Beal Major T. H. Blacknall	29th Arkansas Infantry Regiment, 1st Trans-Mississippi Infantry Regiment
38th Arkansas Infantry Regiment	September 8, 1862	Colonel Robert G. Shaver, Lieutenant Colonel William C. Adams Lieutenant Colonel Milton D. Baber, Major R. R. Henry	Shaver's Infantry Regiment 27th and 38th Consolidated Arkansas Infantry
39th Arkansas Infantry Regiment	June 17, 1862	Colonel Albert W. Johnson Colonel Alexander T. Hawthorn Colonel John B. Cocke † Lieutenant Colonel Cadwallader Polk (acting)	6th Trans-Mississippi Rifle Regiment Johnson's Arkansas Infantry Regiment Hawthorn's Arkansas Infantry Regiment Cocke's Arkansas Infantry Regiment Polk's Arkansas Infantry Regiment
40th Arkansas Infantry (Mounted)	Fall 1863		15th (Northwest) Arkansas Infantry Regiment or 19th (Dockery's) Arkansas Infantry Regiment
41st Arkansas Infantry (Mounted)	Fall 1863	Colonel Daniel W. Jones	41st Arkansas Infantry Regiment (Mounted) 20th Arkansas Infantry Regiment
42nd Arkansas Infantry (Mounted)	Fall 1863	Colonel Oliver P. Lyles	42nd Arkansas Infantry Regiment (Mounted) 23rd Arkansas Infantry Regiment (Mounted) 23rd Arkansas Cavalry Regiment
43rd Arkansas Infantry (Mounted)	Fall 1863		19th (Dockery's) Arkansas Infantry Regiment or 15th (Northwest) Arkansas Infantry Regiment
44th Arkansas Infantry (Mounted)	Fall 1863	Colonel James H. McGehee Lieutenant Colonel Jessup Grider	44th Arkansas Mounted Infantry 29th Arkansas Cavalry Regiment McGehee's Arkansas Cavalry
45th Arkansas Infantry (Mounted)	Summer 1864	Colonel Milton D. Baber Colonel James W. Clark	45th Arkansas Mounted Infantry Shaver's Cavalry
46th Arkansas Infantry (Mounted)	Summer 1864	Colonel John W. Crabtree Colonel William O. Coleman	46th Arkansas Infantry Crabtree's Arkansas Cavalry Coleman's Arkansas Cavalry Regiment
47th Arkansas Infantry (Mounted)	Summer 1864	Colonel Lee Cradall Lieutenant Colonel Richard M. Davis	47th Arkansas Mounted Infantry
48th Arkansas Infantry (Mounted)	Summer 1864	Unknown	48th Arkansas Infantry 48th Arkansas Cavalry Regiment

==== Infantry Battalions ====
Infantry battalions were not intended to be standing organizations during the Civil War. The regiment was the standard organization for both the Union and Confederate Armies. Battalions most often came into existence when there were not enough infantry companies present to form a full regiment, as when Dandrige McRea's 3rd Arkansas Infantry Battalion was formed before the battle of Wilson's Creek. Many of these ad hoc organizations, like McRea's, eventually gained enough companies and received recognition as a full regiment. Some battalions were formed by the detachment of several companies from a parent regiment as when several companies were detached from McCraven's 14th Arkansas Infantry and transferred to Kentucky with Brigadier General Hardee in 1861, and were designated the 9th Arkansas Infantry Battalion. A few battalions, like the 12th Arkansas Infantry Battalion, actually saw significant combat as a separate command.

Battalion	Commander	Alternate Designation	Final Designation
1st Arkansas Infantry Battalion	Lieutenant Colonel John S. Marmaduke	3rd Confederate Infantry Regiment	18th Arkansas Infantry Regiment
2nd Arkansas Infantry Battalion	Major William Naylor Bronaugh		merged with 3rd Arkansas Infantry Regiment
3rd Arkansas Infantry Battalion	Lieutenant Colonel Dandridge McRae	21st (McCrae's) Arkansas Infantry Regiment	15th (Northwest) Arkansas Infantry Regiment
4th Arkansas Infantry Battalion	Lieutenant Colonel Francis Terry Major J. A. Ross		merged with 4th Arkansas Infantry Regiment
7th Arkansas Infantry Battalion	Colonel Frank W. Desha		merged with the 8th Arkansas Infantry Regiment
8th Arkansas Infantry Battalion	Major John Miller Lieutenant Colonel Batt L. Jones	Jones' 1st Arkansas Battalion Miller's 2nd Arkansas Battalion	Consolidated with other units to form the 2nd Arkansas Consolidated Infantry Regiment
9th Arkansas Infantry Battalion	Major John H. Kelly	14th Arkansas Infantry Regiment (McCarver's)	merged with the 8th Arkansas Infantry Regiment
10th Arkansas Infantry Battalion	Lieutenant Colonel R. Scott		
11th Arkansas Infantry Battalion	Major Charles J. Turnbull,		25th Arkansas Infantry Regiment
12th Arkansas Infantry Battalion	Major C. L. Jackson Major William Field Rapley	Rapley's Sharpshooters	2nd Arkansas Consolidated Infantry Regiment
13th Arkansas Infantry Battalion	Major J.L. Witherspoon		16th Arkansas Cavalry Battalion
17th Arkansas Infantry Battalion	Colonel George W. Lemoyne	17th Arkansas Infantry Regiment (Lemoyne's)	Consolidated with the 18th Battalion to form 21st Arkansas Infantry Regiment (Craven's)
18th Arkansas Infantry Battalion	Colonel James H. McCarver	14th (McCarver's) Arkansas Infantry	Consolidated with the 17th Battalion to form 21st Arkansas Infantry Regiment (Craven's)
Williamson's Arkansas Infantry Battalion	Colonel John L. Williamson		21st (McCrae's) Arkansas Infantry Regiment 1st Brook's Arkansas Cavalry Battalion 3rd Arkansas Cavalry Regiment 31st Arkansas Infantry Regiment
Chew's Arkansas Infantry Battalion	Major Robert E. Chew	Chew's Battalion of Sharpshooters	Merged with 39th Arkansas Infantry Regiment
Crawford's Arkansas Infantry Battalion	Lieutenant Colonel William A. Crawford		split between 19th Arkansas Infantry Regiment (Dawson's) and 19th Arkansas Infantry Regiment (Hardy's)
Whittington's Arkansas Infantry Battalion	Lieutenant Colonel T. M. Whittington		eventually assigned to the 24th Arkansas Infantry Regiment

==== Volunteer Companies ====
The basic building block of a regiment during the Civil War period was the volunteer company. Many volunteer militia companies were organized under the authority of the Arkansas militia law during 1860 and 1861. Most of the companies raised during this period had their elections certified by the local militia regimental commander and their commissions were issued by the governor as the commander in chief of the State Militia. This practice continued until the fall of 1861. Other volunteer companies were raised directly for Confederate service and were never organized in the state militia. Volunteer companies, whether militia or raised directly for Confederate service were then organized into new volunteer regiments. A regiment required eight to ten companies for organization. If a unit was not able to field enough companies to organize as a regiment, it was often allowed to organize as a separate battalion until enough companies were added to comprise a full regiment. A separate battalion was commanded by a lieutenant colonel. This list includes only those companies with a distinct name. Many volunteer companies were simply designated "Volunteer Infantry Company, Conway County," or Volunteer Cavalry Company, Conway County".

Company Name	Commanding Officer	Company	Regiment
Arkansas Guards	Captain John C. McCauley	Company K	7th Arkansas Infantry Regiment
Arkansas Rifles	Captain Felix R. Robertson	Company E	18th Arkansas Infantry Regiment
Arkansas Toothpicks	Captain Lucius P. Featherston	Company K	5th Arkansas Infantry Regiment
Arkansas Toothpicks	Captain G. A. Hale	Company B	12th Arkansas Infantry Regiment
Arkansas Travellers	Captain William H. Tebbs	Company A	3rd Arkansas Infantry Regiment
Arkansas Travellers	Captain Robert M. Wallace	Company G	9th Arkansas Infantry Regiment
Ashley Light Infantry	Captain Micajah R. Wilson	Company F	8th Arkansas Infantry Battalion
Ashley Rangers	Captain James H. Capers	Company A	13th Louisiana Battalion
Ashley Volunteers	Captain Vannoy H. Manning	Company K	3rd Arkansas Infantry Regiment
Auburn Grays	Captain Joseph W. Barnett	Company F	18th Arkansas Infantry Regiment
Augusta Guards	Captain Charles H. Matlock	Company D	1st Arkansas Mounted Rifles
Austin Rifles	Captain Andrew J. Gingles	Company I	5th Arkansas Infantry Regiment
Bayou Metoe Hornets		see Turnbull Guards.	
Belle Point Guards	Captain W. R. Hartzig	Company G	5th Regiment, Arkansas State Troops
Berlin Beauregards	Captain James H. Capers	Company B	3rd Arkansas Infantry Regiment
Bevering Riflemen	Captain Benjamin F. Sweeney	Company C	5th Arkansas Infantry Regiment
Black River Rifles	Captain Robert C. Jones	Company D	8th Arkansas Infantry Battalion
Blackburn Guards	Captain Samuel V. Reid	Company H	3rd Arkansas Infantry Regiment
Booneville Rifles	Captain William Gipson	Company A	2nd Arkansas Mounted Rifles
Border Rangers	Captain Dandridge McRae	Company E	6th Arkansas Cavalry Battalion
Bradley Guards	Captain John M. Bradley	Company A	9th Arkansas Infantry Regiment
Brierfield Rebels	Captain Archibald J. McNeill	Company D	6th Arkansas Cavalry Battalion
Bright Star Rifles	Captain Josephus C. Tison	Company D	4th Arkansas Infantry Regiment
Brownsville Rifles	Captain Robert S. Gantt	Company G	5th Arkansas Infantry Regiment
Burrowville Mountain Guards	Captain John J. Dawson	Company I	3rd Confederate Infantry Regiment
Caddo Rifles	Captain Francis J. Erwin	Company C	4th Arkansas Infantry Regiment
Calhoun Escopets	Captain Joseph B. McCulloch	Company A	4th Arkansas Infantry Regiment
Calhoun Invincibles	Captain Oliver H. P. Black	Company K	4th Arkansas Infantry Regiment
Calhoun Yellow Jackets	Captain Philip H. Echols	Company B1	6th Arkansas Infantry Regiment
Camden Cavalry	Captain Samuel G. Earle Jr.	Company G	3rd Arkansas Cavalry Regiment
Camden Knights	Captain William L. Crenshaw	Company C	1st Arkansas Infantry Regiment
Camden Knights No. 2	Captain John L. Logan	Company G	11th Arkansas Infantry Regiment
Cane Hill Rifles	Captain Pleasant W. Buchanan	Company D	3rd Regiment, Arkansas State Troops
Capitol Guards	Captain Gordon N. Peay	Company A	6th Arkansas Infantry Regiment
Centre Guards	Captain Isaac. D. Booe	unattached.	
Chalk Bluff Rebels	Captain William Reed	Company F	3rd Confederate Infantry Regiment
Champagnolle Guards	Captain Thomas F. Nolan	Company E	3rd Arkansas Infantry Regiment
Chickasaw Guards	Captain George A. Atkins	Company C	12th Arkansas Battalion.
Chicot Rangers	Captain Daniel H. Reynolds	Company A	1st Arkansas Mounted Rifles
Chicot Rebels	Captain James D. Imboden	Company B	8th Arkansas Infantry Battalion
Choctaw Rifles	Captain Richard S. Fears	Company C	10th Arkansas Infantry Regiment
City Guards	Captain Richard Lyon	Company H	6th Arkansas Infantry Regiment
Clan McGregor	Captain Donelson McGregor	Company D	1st Arkansas Infantry Regiment
Clark County Volunteers	Captain Charles S. Stark	Company B	1st Arkansas Infantry Regiment
Clark Rifles	Captain Newton S. Love	Company A	8th Arkansas Infantry Battalion
Clear Lake Independent Guards	Captain Bartley M. Barnes	unattached.	
Columbia Guards	Captain Dawson L. Killgore	Company G	6th Arkansas Infantry Regiment
Colville Guards	Captain James M. Richards	Company G	15th (Northwest) Arkansas Infantry Regiment
Confederate Grays	Captain Simon B. Thomasson	Company B2	9th Arkansas Infantry Regiment
Confederate Guards	Captain John A. Rowles	Company E	4th Arkansas Infantry Regiment
Confederate Stars	Captain Thomas M. Whittington	Company C	3rd Arkansas Infantry Regiment
Conway Invincibles	Captain Edwin L. Vaughan	Company E	10th Arkansas Infantry Regiment
Conway Tigers	Captain John W. Duncan	Company I	10th Arkansas Infantry Regiment
Corley's Spies	Captain Samuel Corley	Company A	1st Arkansas Cavalry Regiment
Cotton Plant Guards	Captain Charles F. Lynch	Company G	18th Arkansas Infantry Regiment
Crawford Artillery	Captain James T. Stewart	Company F	3rd Regiment, Arkansas State Troops
Crawford County Rangers	Captain Thomas B. Brantley	Company C	1st Arkansas Cavalry Battalion (Stirman's).
Crawford Guards	Captain Joel H. Foster	Company K	3rd Regiment, Arkansas State Troops
Crittenden Rangers	Captain R. T. Redman	Company C	6th Arkansas Cavalry Battalion
Crockett Rifles	Captain Robert H. Crockett	Company H	1st Arkansas Infantry Regiment
Cut-Off Guards	Captain William H. Isom	Company B1	9th Arkansas Infantry Regiment
Dallas Volunteer Rifles	Captain Feaster J. Cameron	Company C	6th Arkansas Infantry Regiment
Danley's Rangers	Captain Benjamin F. Danley	Company D	3rd Arkansas Cavalry Regiment
Davis Blues	Captain Joseph L. Neal	Company F	5th Regiment, Arkansas State Troops
Davis Light Horse	Captain William H. Brooks	Company E	1st Arkansas Battalion.
Des Arc Rangers	Captain John S. Pearson	Company B	1st Arkansas Mounted Rifles
Des Arc Regulars	Captain Felix G. Gleaves	unattached.	
Desha Rangers	Captain William S. Malcomb	unattached.	
DeWitt Guards	Captain James M. Boswell	Company K	1st Arkansas Infantry Regiment
Dixie Grays	Captain Samuel G. Smith	Company E	6th Arkansas Infantry Regiment
Dixie Guards	Captain William C. Haislip	Company F	9th Arkansas Infantry Regiment
Drew County Grays	Captain William D. Trotter	Company E	24th Arkansas Infantry Regiment
Drew Light Horse	Captain Henry S. Hudspeth	Company B	6th Arkansas Cavalry Battalion
El Dorado Sentinels	Captain Asa S. Morgan	Company A	1st Arkansas Infantry Regiment
Erin Guard	Captain George B. Hunt	Company K1	13th Arkansas Infantry Regiment
Ettomon Guards	Captain William H. Martin	Company F	1st Arkansas Infantry Regiment
Fagan Guards	Captain William N. Bronaugh	Company B	2nd Arkansas Infantry Battalion
Fagan Rifles	Captain John R. Lacy	Company C	2nd Arkansas Infantry Battalion
Fairplay Rifles	Captain Augustus A. Crawford	Company D	11th Arkansas Infantry Regiment
Falcon Guards	Captain Jackson C. C. Moss	Company E	11th Arkansas Infantry Regiment
Fletcher Rifles	Captain Elliot H. Fletcher Jr.	Company C	3rd Confederate Infantry Regiment
Fort Smith Grays	Captain Cabell	Company D	4th Regiment, Arkansas State Troops
Fort Smith Rifles	Captain James H. Sparks	Company A	3rd Regiment, Arkansas State Troops
Frontier Guards	Captain Hugh T. Brown	Company G	3rd Regiment, Arkansas State Troops
Galla Rangers	Captain Benjamin T. Embry	Company B	2nd Arkansas Mounted Rifles
Glaize Rifles	Captain George E. Orme	Company B	7th Arkansas Infantry Regiment
Greene County Roughs	Captain Guy S. Murray	Company E	8th Arkansas Infantry Battalion
Greene County Volunteers	Captain James C. Anderson		1st Arkansas 30-Day Volunteers Regiment
Hardee Guards	Captain James T. Armstrong	Company H	9th Arkansas Infantry Regiment
Harris Guards	Captain James T. Harris	Company A	15th Arkansas Infantry Regiment (Josey's)
Hempstead Cavalry	Captain George E. Gamble	Company H	2nd Arkansas Mounted Rifles
Hempstead Hornets	Captain Rufus K. Garland	Company B	4th Arkansas Infantry Regiment
Hempstead Legion	Captain Daniel W. Webster	Company A	20th Arkansas Infantry Regiment
Hempstead Plough Boys	Captain Jefferson Cottingham	Company E	20th Arkansas Infantry Regiment
Hempstead Rifles	Captain John R. Gratiot	Company A	3rd Regiment, Arkansas State Troops
Hempstead Rifles No. 2	Captain Benjamin P. Jett, Jr.	Company H	17th (Griffith's) Arkansas Infantry Regiment
Henry Hornets	Captain Philip G. Henry	Company C	9th Arkansas Infantry Regiment
High's Repellers	Captain William T. High	Company B	2nd Arkansas 30-Day Volunteers Regiment
Hindman Guards	Captain Henry B. Blakemore	Company G	15th Arkansas Infantry Regiment (Josey's)
Holly Springs Targeteers	Captain Ezekiel P. Chandler	Company D	12th Arkansas Infantry Regiment
Hot Spring Hornets	Captain Daniel A. Newman	Company F	3rd Arkansas Infantry Regiment
Hot Springs Cavalry	Captain Joseph Jester	Company F	3rd Arkansas Cavalry Regiment
Hot Springs Infantry	Captain Joseph A. Gregory	Company A	2nd Arkansas Infantry Battalion
Hot Springs Rifles	Captain Edwin C. Jones	Company E	12th Arkansas Infantry Regiment
Independence Guards	Captain Justus F. Tracy	Company E	8th Arkansas Infantry Regiment
Independence Rifles	Captain William E. Gibbs	Company K	1st Arkansas Mounted Rifles
Independent Blues	Captain J. E. Horner	unattached.	
Independent Light Horse Guards	Captain Powhatan Perkins	Company D	1st Cavalry Regiment, Arkansas State Troops
Invincible Guards	Captain Thomas P. Dockery	Company A	5th Regiment, Arkansas State Troops
Izard Volunteers	Captain William S. Lindsey	Company A	14th Arkansas Infantry Regiment (McCarver's)
Jackson Aids	Captain William P. Ragland	Company A	6th Arkansas Battalion.
Jackson Guards	Captain Alexander C. Pickett	Company G	1st Arkansas Infantry Regiment
Jackson Guards	Captain Wiley M. Mitchell	Company G	33rd Arkansas Infantry Regiment
Jackson Minute-Men	Captain William J. Wyatt	Company F	12th Arkansas Infantry Regiment
Jefferson Guards	Captain Charles H. Carlton	Company B	15th Arkansas Infantry Regiment (Josey's)
Jefferson Minute-Men	Captain James C. Thompson	Company A	18th Arkansas Infantry Regiment
Jefferson Rifles	Captain David W. Carroll	Company K	18th Arkansas Infantry Regiment
Jo. Wright Guards	Captain Hampton B. Fancher	Company H	4th Regiment, Arkansas State Troops
Johnson Guards	Captain Alfred D. King	Company H	3rd Regiment, Arkansas State Troops
Johnson Rifles	Captain Oliver Basham	Company C	1st Arkansas Mounted Rifles
L'Anguille Rebels	Captain Lemuel O. Bridewell	Company A	2nd Arkansas Infantry Regiment
La Grange Guards	Captain Daniel C. Govan	Company F	2nd Arkansas Infantry Regiment
Lady Davis Guards	Captain Andrew J. Griffin	Company B2	6th Arkansas Infantry Regiment
Lafayette Guards	Captain Samuel H. Dill	Company F	6th Arkansas Infantry Regiment
Lawrence County Rifles	Captain Zachariah P. McAlexander	Company E	1st Arkansas Mounted Rifles
Lawrence Dead-Shots		see Lawrence Sharp-Shooters.	
Lawrence Sharp-Shooters	Captain Joseph C. Holmes	Company G	8th Arkansas Infantry Battalion
Linden Dead-Shots	Captain Poindexter Dunn	Company E	3rd Confederate Infantry Regiment
Lisbon Invincibles	Captain Samuel T. Turner	Company I	6th Arkansas Infantry Regiment
Little Rock Grays	Captain James B. Johnson	Company A	3rd Confederate Infantry Regiment
McCown Guards	Captain D. Whit Harris	unattached.	
McCulloch Avengers	Captain Henry P. Poston	Company B	20th Arkansas Infantry Regiment
McCulloch Guards	Captain George W. Bayne	Company I	9th Arkansas Infantry Regiment
McCulloch Rangers	Captain Robert W. Harper	Company I	1st Arkansas Mounted Rifles
McKeever Guards	Captain Thomas J. Payne	Company B	4th Arkansas Infantry Battalion
Macon Cavalry	Captain Thomas M. Cochran	Company F	6th Arkansas Cavalry Battalion
Magruder Guards	Captain Frederick W. Hoadley	Company D	4th Arkansas Infantry Battalion
Monroe Blues	Captain Gaston W. Baldwin	Company K	15th Arkansas Infantry Regiment (Josey's)
Montgomery Hunters	Captain John M. Simpson	Company F	4th Arkansas Infantry Regiment
Monticello Cavalry		see Jackson Aids.	
Monticello Guards	Captain James A. Jackson	Company I	1st Arkansas Infantry Regiment
Monticello Home Guard	Captain John S. Handley	unattached.	
Muddy Bayou Heroes	Captain Zachariah B. Jennings	Company F	10th Arkansas Infantry Regiment
Napoleon Grays	Captain Henry E. Green	Company E	15th Arkansas Infantry Regiment (Josey's)
Napoleon Rifles	Captain John L. Porter	Company G	1st Arkansas Mounted Rifles
North Fork Rangers	Captain William N. Parish	Company H	18th Arkansas Infantry Regiment
Osceola Hornets	Captain Charles Bowen	Company G	2nd Confederate Infantry
Ouachita Cavalry	Captain James M. Gee	Company H	3rd Arkansas Cavalry Regiment
Ouachita Grays	Captain Hope T. Hodnett	Company K	6th Arkansas Infantry Regiment
Ouachita Rifles	Captain Samuel H. Southerland	Company I	18th Arkansas Infantry Regiment
Ouachita Voltigeurs	Captain Charles A. Bridewell	Company D	6th Arkansas Infantry Regiment
Pat. Cleburne Guards	Captain Washington L. Martin	Company B	2nd Arkansas Infantry Regiment
Perry County Mountaineers	Captain William Wilson	Company H	10th Arkansas Infantry Regiment
Peyton Rifles	Captain Daniel W. Ringo		Borland's Battalion.
Phillips Guards	Captain William S. Otey	Company H	15th Arkansas Infantry Regiment (Josey's)
Pike County Blues	Captain James F. Black	Company G	4th Arkansas Infantry Regiment
Pike County Rangers	Captain William J. Kelly	Company H	16th Arkansas Infantry Regiment
Pike Guards	Captain Samuel R. Bell	Company C	3rd Regiment, Arkansas State Troops
Pike Guards	Captain John H. Dye	Company E	7th Arkansas Infantry Regiment
Pine Bluff Artillery	Captain Frederick P. Steck	Company G	3rd Confederate Infantry Regiment
Pine Bluff Rebels	Captain Read Fletcher	Company D	18th Arkansas Infantry Regiment
Polk County Invincibles	Captain William H. Earp	Company H	4th Arkansas Infantry Regiment
Polk Rifles	Captain James B. Williamson	Company I	4th Arkansas Infantry Regiment
Pope Walker Guards	Captain Charles A. Carroll	Company A	1st Cavalry Regiment, Arkansas State Troops
Prairie County Avengers	Captain M. C. Peel	Company C	18th Arkansas Infantry Regiment
Princeton Light Horse	Captain William T. M. Holmes	Company A	3rd Arkansas Cavalry Regiment
Princeton Rifles	Captain Israel N. McClendon	Company B	18th Arkansas Infantry Regiment
Pulaski Lancers	Captain Thomas J. Churchill		Borland's Battalion.
Pulaski Rangers	Captain Thomas J. Churchill	Company F	1st Arkansas Mounted Rifles
Quitman Rifles	Captain Allen R. Witt	Company A	10th Arkansas Infantry Regiment
Quitman Sharp-Shooters	Captain Jesse E. Martin	Company B	31st Arkansas Infantry Regiment
Ready Rifles	Captain James B. Venable	Company B	10th Arkansas Infantry Regiment
Rector Guards	Captain George W. Glenn	Company D	15th Arkansas Infantry Regiment (Josey's)
Rector Guards	Captain Ira G. Robertson	Company K	3rd Confederate Infantry Regiment
Red River Rifles	Captain Thomas G. Merrick	Company G	10th Arkansas Infantry Regiment
Richland Rangers	Captain John C. Johnson	Company B1	13th Arkansas Infantry Regiment
Rough and Ready Guards	Captain George W. King		Borland's Battalion.
Rough and Ready Riflemen	Captain John C. Douglas	Company B	11th Arkansas Infantry Regiment
Rust Guards	Captain Joseph H. Bell	Company L	3rd Arkansas Infantry Regiment
Saline Avengers	Captain Lewis F. Mauney	Company F	11th Arkansas Infantry Regiment
Saline Guards	Captain James F. Fagan	Company E	1st Arkansas Infantry Regiment
Saline Rifle Rangers	Captain Mazarine J. Henderson	Company C	3rd Arkansas Cavalry Regiment
Saline Tornadoes	Captain McDuff Vance	Company A	11th Arkansas Infantry Regiment
Scott County Cavalry	Captain George W. Featherston	Company H	1st Cavalry Regiment, Arkansas State Troops
Sebastian County Cavalry	Captain Thomas Lewis	Company B	1st Cavalry Regiment, Arkansas State Troops
Selma Rifles	Captain Robert S. Taylor	Company D	3rd Arkansas Infantry Regiment
Sevier County Stars	Captain John G. McKean	Company H	5th Regiment, Arkansas State Troops
Sevier Rifles	Captain Henry K. Brown	Company G	2nd Arkansas Mounted Rifles
Shamrock Guards	Captain John H. Crump	Company D	3rd Confederate Infantry Regiment
Southern Defenders	Captain Edward W. Gantt	Company K	12th Arkansas Infantry Regiment
Southern Flag Company	Captain John S. Walker	Company G	12th Arkansas Infantry Regiment
Springfield Sharp-Shooters	Captain Samuel S. Ford	Company K	10th Arkansas Infantry Regiment
Swamp Rangers	Captain Henry V. Keep	Company H	3rd Confederate Infantry Regiment
Three Creeks Rifles	Captain John W. Reedy	Company G	3rd Arkansas Infantry Regiment
Toombs Rifles		see Little Rock Grays.	
Totten Guards	Captain Augustus M. Reinhardt	Company C	25th Arkansas Infantry Regiment
Trenton Guards	Captain James W. Scaife	Company E	2nd Arkansas Infantry Regiment
Tulip Rifles	Captain George D. Alexander	Company I	3rd Arkansas Infantry Regiment
Turnbull Guards	Captain Thomas F. Murff	Company A	4th Arkansas Infantry Battalion
Tyronza Rebels	Captain Robert L. Harding	Company I	15th Arkansas Infantry Regiment (Josey's)
Van Dorn Cavalry	Captain Richard Hooker	Company C and D	32nd Arkansas Infantry Regiment
Walker Grays	Captain Lawrence R. Frisk	Company B	5th Arkansas Infantry Regiment
West Point Rifles	Captain A. T. Jones	Company F	8th Arkansas Infantry Regiment
White County Volunteers	Captain John A. Pemberton	Company D	10th Arkansas Infantry Regiment
Windsor Guards	Captain William J. Smith	Company F	29th Arkansas Infantry Regiment
Wood's Rifles	Captain Joel G. Wood	Company E	8th Arkansas Infantry Battalion
Worsham Avengers	Captain James G. Johnson	Company C	20th Arkansas Infantry Regiment
Yell Blues	Captain Cornelius S. Lawrence	Company D	5th Regiment, Arkansas State Troops
Yell County Rifles	Captain Thomas J. Daniel	Company H	1st Arkansas Mounted Rifles
Yell Guards	Captain Francis M. McNally	Company C	15th Arkansas Infantry Regiment (Josey's)
Yell Rifles	Captain Patrick R. Cleburne	Company F	15th Arkansas Infantry Regiment (Josey's)
Young Guard	Captain John F. Cameron	Company B	3rd Confederate Infantry Regiment

=== Cavalry ===
Arkansas mounted units consisted of three types, Cavalry, Mounted Infantry, and Partisan Rangers. Cavalry forces fought principally on horseback, armed with carbines, pistols, and especially sabers. Only a small percentage of Arkansas mounted forces met this definition. Some Arkansas Confederate regiments carried shotguns, especially early in the war. Due to a lack of appropriate weapons and training in actual cavalry tactics, most Arkansas horsesoldiers were actually Mounted Infantry. Mounted Infantry moved on horseback but dismounted for fighting on foot, armed principally with rifles. In the second half of the war, most of the units considered to be cavalry actually fought battles using the tactics of mounted infantry. Irregular forces (partisan rangers or guerrillas) were generally mounted forces. There is little commonality as to their weapons—in general, any available were used.

While the concept of a mounted infantry force able to move quickly from point to point and fight as infantry seemed appealing, especially to new recruits, it proved to come at significant costs. Logistically a mounted force was much more costly to sustain and the units themselves tended to be less effective in the actual war effort than standard infantry formations.

Due to severe drought in Arkansas in 1862 and 1863, forage for horses became increasing scares and led to calls from multiple Confederate commanders to dismount the mounted units. Multiple Confederate commanders lamented the fact that the country had been "eaten out" by cavalry. General Hindman at one point stated:

cavalry duty could be performed by the independent companies of the Provost Marshall just as well and cheaper than the worthless, marauding, eating hordes of cavalry wandering the area.

Mounted infantry, while theoretically more maneuverable, were in practice less disciplined and less reliable than the standard infantry formation. Confederate commanders, especially in the Department of the Trans-Mississippi regularly bemoaned the fact that most recruits wanted to "jine the cavalry" as opposed to infantry. Confederate commanders often suggested dismounting cavalry and mounted infantry units in order to man infantry units and this happened to several Arkansas units that served in the Army of Tennessee.

I respectfully request that the department commander refuse all further recruiting for cavalry at once. So long as it is permitted it will be impossible to raise an infantry force which is so much needed now and the present cavalry force is more than ample to eat out all the forage of the country I should be pleased to have a cavalry regiment if it could be obtained but I have seen none throughout the war -I have not seen a cavalry officer who was a sufficient swordsmen to unfix a bayonet nor a single private who could go thru the manual of the saber nor have I seen on this side of the Mississippi 20 privates who were armed with the saber. Very few have carbines or saddle holsters for pistols and still less with the necessary dragoon equipments. If the C.S.A. is unable to furnish cavalry armed educated and equipped as above I am strongly of the opinion that all with shotguns and rifles in their hands should be dismounted excepting enough for scout and picket duty and put the remainder in the line as infantry. ...

The continued organization of more and more mounted units, and the retention of so many others, in the Department of the Trans-Mississippi seem to defy prevailing military wisdom. The last standard infantry regiment formed in Arkansas during the war was the 39th Arkansas Infantry Regiment, formed in 1862. After 1862 all new organizations were mounted infantry.

==== List of Cavalry Regiments ====
Cavalry regiments were organized from companies (also called, "troops") authorized at up to 100 men, ten companies made up a regiment. Two or more companies might be organized into a battalion (also called a "squadron").

Regiment	Organization Date	Commanders	Alternated designations
1st Arkansas Mounted Rifles	June 16, 1861	Colonel Thomas J. Churchill Colonel Daniel H. Reynolds Colonel Robert W. Harper	1st Arkansas Mounted Rifles (Consolidated)
1st Arkansas Mounted Rifles (Consolidated)	April 9, 1865	Colonel Henry G. Bunn	1st Arkansas Mounted Rifles 2nd Arkansas Mounted Rifles 4th Arkansas Infantry Regiment. 4th Arkansas Infantry Regiment. 31st Arkansas Infantry Regiment. 9th Arkansas Infantry Regiment. 9th Arkansas Infantry Regiment. 25th Arkansas Infantry Regiment.
1st Arkansas Cavalry Regiment (Crawford's)	December 30, 1863	Colonel William A. Crawford	10th Arkansas Cavalry Regiment Crawford's Arkansas Cavalry Regiment
1st Arkansas Cavalry Regiment (Dobbin's)	Spring 1863	Colonel Archibald S. Dobbins Major Samuel Corley	Dobbins's Brigade Chrisman's Cavalry Battalion
2nd Arkansas Cavalry Regiment (Slemons's)	May 15, 1862	Colonel William Ferguson Slemons Lt. Col T. W. Jackman	2nd Arkansas Cavalry Battalion 6th Arkansas Cavalry Battalion 4th Arkansas Cavalry Regiment 18th Arkansas Cavalry Battalion
2nd Arkansas Cavalry Regiment (Morgan's)	December 24, 1863	Colonel Thomas J. Morgan	5th Arkansas Cavalry Regiment Newton's Regiment Arkansas Cavalry, Morgan's Regiment Arkansas Cavalry, 2nd Arkansas Cavalry Regiment, 8th Arkansas Cavalry Regiment,
2nd Arkansas Mounted Rifles	July 29, 1861	Colonel James M. McIntosh Colonel Benjamin T. Embry Colonel Harris Flanagin Lieutenant Colonel James A. Williamson	1st Consolidated Mounted Rifles
3rd Arkansas Cavalry Regiment	June 10, 1861 (State Service) July 29, 1863 (Confederate Service)	Colonel Solon Borland Colonel Samuel G. Earle Colonel Anson W. Hobson Lieutenant Colonel M. J. Henderson.	1st Arkansas Cavalry Battalion
4th Arkansas Cavalry Regiment	December 15, 1863	Colonel Anderson Gordon Colonel Charles A. Carroll Colonel Lee L. Thomson	Gordon's Arkansas Cavalry Regiment 2nd (Gordon's) Arkansas Cavalry Regiment 9th Arkansas Cavalry Regiment 11th Arkansas Cavalry Regiment 1st Arkansas Cavalry Regiment (Carrolls)
5th Arkansas Cavalry Regiment	April 1863	Colonel Robert C. Newton	2nd Arkansas Cavalry Regiment (Morgan's)
6th Arkansas Cavalry Regiment	September 1862	Colonel James F. Fagan Colonel James C. Monroe	1st Trans-Mississippi Cavalry Regiment Fagan's Arkansas Cavalry Regiment Monroe's Arkansas Cavalry Regiment
7th Arkansas Cavalry Regiment	July 25, 1863	Colonel John F. Hill	Hill's Cavalry Battalion Hill's Arkansas Cavalry Regiment
8th Arkansas Cavalry Regiment	December 24, 1863	Colonel Thomas J. Morgan	Newton's Regiment Arkansas Cavalry, Morgan's Regiment Arkansas Cavalry, 2nd Arkansas Cavalry Regiment; 5th Regiment Arkansas Cavalry.
9th Arkansas Cavalry Regiment	December 15, 1863	Colonel Anderson Gordon	4th Arkansas Cavalry Regiment
10th Arkansas Cavalry Regiment (Witt's)	Summer 1864	Colonel Allen R. Witt	10th Arkansas Infantry Regiment
10th Arkansas Cavalry Regiment (Newton's)	October 31, 1864	Colonel Robert C. Newton	3rd Regiment of Arkansas State Cavalry
11th Arkansas Cavalry Regiment	1864	Colonel John L. Logan	11th Arkansas Infantry Regiment Logan's Arkansas Cavalry Regiment 11th and 17th Consolidated Arkansas Infantry Regiment
12th Arkansas Cavalry Regiment	February 15, 1864	Colonel John C. Wright	2nd Cavalry Battalion, Arkansas State Troops Wright's Arkansas Cavalry Regiment
13th Arkansas Cavalry Regiment	Unknown	Colonel James J. Clarkson	Clarkson's Battalion Confederate Cavalry (Independent Rangers)
16th Arkansas Cavalry Regiment	December 4, 1861	Colonel John F. Hill Colonel David Provence	16th Arkansas Infantry Regiment
17th Arkansas Cavalry Regiment		Colonel John L. Logan Colonel John Griffith	11th and 17th Consolidated Arkansas Infantry Regiment
23rd Arkansas Cavalry Regiment	Summer 1864	Colonel Oliver P. Lyles	42nd Arkansas Infantry Regiment (Mounted) 23rd Arkansas Infantry Regiment (Mounted)
44th Arkansas Infantry (Mounted)	Summer 1864	Colonel James H. McGehee Lieutenant Colonel Jessup Grider	29th Arkansas Cavalry Regiment McGehee's Arkansas Cavalry
45th Arkansas Cavalry Regiment	Summer 1864	Colonel Milton D. Baber Colonel James W. Clark	45th Arkansas Mounted Infantry Shaver's Cavalry
46th Arkansas Cavalry Regiment	Summer 1864	Colonel Crabtree Colonel W. O. Coleman	46th Arkansas Infantry Crabtree's Arkansas Cavalry Coleman's Arkansas Cavalry Regiment
47th Arkansas Cavalry Regiment	Summer 1864	Colonel Lee Cradall Lieutenant Colonel Richard M. Davis	47th Arkansas Mounted Infantry
48th Arkansas Cavalry Regiment	Summer 1864	Unknown	48th Arkansas Infantry 48th Arkansas Cavalry Regiment
Brandenburch's Arkansas Cavalry Regiment	1862	Captain Solomon I. Brandenburg	Brandenburch's Company
Carlton's Arkansas Cavalry Regiment		Colonel Charles H. Carlton Lieutenant Colonel R. H. Thompson	Carlton's Arkansas Cavalry Battalion 28th Arkansas Cavalry

==== List of Cavalry Battalions ====
Battalion	Organization Date	Commanders	Alternated designations
1st Arkansas Cavalry Battalion (Borlands)	April 1861	Colonel Solon Borland	3rd Arkansas Cavalry Regiment
1st Arkansas Cavalry Battalion (Stirman's)	1861	Major William H. Brooks Colonel Erasmus J. Stirman	1st Arkansas Cavalry Battalion (Brooks') 1st (Stirman's) Battalion Sharpshooters Stirman's Regiment of Sharpshooters
1st Battalion, Arkansas Reserve Cavalry	1864	Lieut. Col. Henry D. Flippin	Flippin's Battalion of "Home Guards", Flippin's battalion
2nd Arkansas Cavalry Battalion	April 1862	Major William D. Barnett	2nd Arkansas Cavalry Regiment (Slemons's)
3rd Arkansas Cavalry Battalion	April 20, 1864	Lieutenant Colonel Thomas M. Gunter	Gunther's Arkansas Cavalry Battalion
6th Arkansas Cavalry Battalion	August 1861	Major Charles W. Phifer	1st Arkansas Cavalry Battalion Phifer's Arkansas Cavalry Battalion White's Arkansas Cavalry Battalion McNeill's Arkansas Cavalry Battalion
13th Arkansas Cavalry Battalion	August 1, 1862	James McCarney O'Neill	6th Arkansas Cavalry Regiment
15th Arkansas Cavalry Battalion	September 20, 1863	Lieutenant Colonel Michael W. Buster	Buster's Arkansas Cavalry Battalion Clarkson's Cavalry Battalion, Independent Rangers
16th Arkansas Cavalry Battalion	1864	Major James L. Witherspoon	Witherspoon's Arkansas Cavalry Battalion 13th Arkansas Cavalry Battalion
17th Arkansas Cavalry Battalion	March 17, 1863	Lieutenant Colonel John M. Harrell	Harrell's Arkansas Cavalry Battalion Harrell's Battalion Arkansas State Troops Crawford's Arkansas Cavalry Battalion
18th Arkansas Cavalry Battalion	September 1864	Lieutenant Colonel Elisha Lawley McMurtrey	2nd Arkansas Cavalry Regiment (Slemons's) McMurtrey's Arkansas Cavalry Battalion
Anderson's Arkansas Cavalry Battalion	September 18, 1864	Captain William L. Anderson	
Chrisman's Arkansas Cavalry Battalion	September 28, 1862	Major Francis M. Chrisman	1st Arkansas Cavalry Regiment (Dobbin's)
Crawford's Arkansas Cavalry Battalion	March 1863	Major William A. Crawford	17th Arkansas Cavalry Battalion.
Davies' Arkansas Cavalry Battalion	1864	Lieutenant Colonel J. F. Davies	14th Missouri Cavalry Battalion 7th Missouri Cavalry Regiment
Ford's Arkansas Cavalry Battalion	August 27, 1864.	Lieutenant Colonel Barney Ford	Ford's Missouri Battalion
Gipson's Mounted Rifles Battalion	July 1862	Major William Gipson	Gipson's Cavalry Regiment Mounted Rifles
Hill's Arkansas Cavalry Battalion	April 1863	Colonel John F. Hill	7th Arkansas Cavalry Regiment
Nave's Arkansas Cavalry Battalion	April 1865	Major R. H. Nave	
Poe's Arkansas Cavalry Battalion	December 1863	Major J. T. Poe	11th Arkansas Infantry Regiment
Rogan's Arkansas Cavalry Battalion	Summer of 1862	Colonel James W. Rogan	30th Arkansas Infantry Regiment Mounted
Thompson's Arkansas Cavalry Battalion		Colonel Lee L. Thompson	Thompson's Arkansas Cavalry Regiment Carroll's Arkansas Cavalry
Woosley's Arkansas Cavalry Battalion	Spring 1864	James Woosley	Gunther's Arkansas Cavalry Battalion

==== Orphan Arkansas cavalry units listed on the National Park Service Soldiers and Sailor System ====
The Civil War Soldiers and Sailors System is a computerized database containing very basic facts about servicemen who served on both sides during the Civil War. The system contains names and other basic information from 6.3 million soldier records in the National Archives. The facts about the soldiers are indexed to many millions of other documents about Union and Confederate Civil War soldiers maintained by the National Archives and Records Administration. The information includes: histories of regiments in both the Union and Confederate Armies, links to descriptions of significant battles of the war, and other historical information. The site currently includes regimental histories of units from 44 states and territories. Joseph Crute's Units of the Confederate Army is the primary source for Confederate unit histories on the site. Because the list of units was compiled over thirty years after the war, from very fragmentary records collected by the United States War Department, some units are misidentified, some being listed as regiments that may in fact have only been a company, such as Brandenburch's Arkansas Cavalry Regiment, which in fact was actually composed of one independent cavalry company surrendered at the battle of Arkansas Post. Several Missouri units are misidentified as Arkansas Confederate units, such as "Coffee's Arkansas Cavalry Regiment", which is actually the 6th Missouri Cavalry. The site contains several alleged Arkansas Confederate units for which no other information exists other than short list of names, probably developed from prisoner of war rosters. Most of these units have less than six identified unit members. Several have only one identified unit member. The following units have no published history and may not have actually been Arkansas Confederate units:

Regiment	Organization Date	Commanders	Alternated designations
Armstrong's Arkansas Cavalry Regiment	Possibly 1860	Possibly Captain Lynas Armstrong	Possibly Company C, 1st Cavalry Regiment, Arkansas State Troops
Dan's Arkansas Cavalry Regiment	Unknown	Unknown	
Fitzhugh's Arkansas Cavalry Regiment	Unknown	Unknown	
Hindman's Arkansas Cavalry Regiment	Unknown	Unknown	
Leve's Arkansas Cavalry Regiment	Unknown	Unknown	
Rutherford's Arkansas Cavalry Regiment	July 1862	Possibly Captain George B. Rutherford	Possibly Company D, 1st Arkansas Cavalry Regiment (Dobbin's)
Pall's Arkansas Cavalry Battalion	Unknown	Unknown	
Weber's Arkansas Cavalry Regiment	Unknown	Possibly Captain A. V. Weber	Possibly Company A, Carlton's Arkansas Cavalry Regiment

=== Artillery ===
Most artillery units seem to have begun the war named for the city or county that sponsored its organization. In the Official Records, artillery units are most often referred to by the name of their battery commander. During the war, some effort was made to organize artillery units into battalions and regiments, but the units almost never functioned above the battery level, and were often broken out and fought as single gun sections. For these reasons the Arkansas artillery organizations are listed by several names. The Arkansas batteries which served primarily in the Confederate Army of Tennessee or Army of Mississippi, (east of the Mississippi River) were "officially" designated as "_st Arkansas Light Artillery". On November 19, 1864, General E. Kirby Smith, commanding the Confederate Trans-Mississippi Department, issued Special Orders No. 290, organizing the artillery of the department into battalions, and listing the various batteries as "_st Arkansas Field Battery". The component batteries rarely, if ever, operated together. They were usually assigned individually to an infantry or cavalry brigade.

Final Designation	Organization Date	Commander's	Alternate Designation
1st Arkansas Light Artillery	April 1861 (First Organization) October 1861 (Second Organization)	Captain John G. Reid Captain David Provence Captain John T. Humphreys Captain John W. Rivers	Fort Smith Artillery Reid's Battery Rivers' Battery Provence's Battery, Humphreys' Battery
2nd Arkansas Light Artillery	July 15, 1861	Captain Franklin Roberts Captain Jannedine H. Wiggins	Clark County Artillery Arkansas Horse Artillery Wiggins' Battery Company E, 14th Georgia Artillery Battalion
3rd Arkansas Light Artillery	State Service, June 15, 1861 Confederate Service, July 25, 1861	Captain James G. Thrall Captain George W. McCown Captain George T. Hubbard	Jackson Light Artillery Thrall's Battery McCown's Battery Arkansas Rats
1st Arkansas Field Battery	April 1861	Captain James J. Gaines Captain Francis M. McNally	John D. Adams Artillery Adams Artillery. Gaines' Arkansas Battery McNally's Arkansas Battery
2nd Arkansas Field Battery	August 1, 1861	Captain William Hart Captain Francis McNally	McNally's Battery Dallas Artillery, Hart's Battery
3rd Arkansas Field Battery	December 1860, State Militia December 27, 1861, Reorganized	Captain Robert C. Newton Captain William E. Woodruff, Jr. Captain John G. Marshall	Pulaski Light Artillery, Weaver Light Artillery Marshall's Battery
4th Arkansas Field Battery	Spring 1862	Captain Henry C. West	Desha County Artillery, West's Battery
5th Arkansas Field Battery	April 1862	Captain William C. Bryan Captain William Hogg Captain Christopher Columbus Scott	Appeal Battery Memphis Appeal Battery
6th Arkansas Field Battery	June 14, 1862	Captain Chambers B. Etter	Washington Artillery, Etter's Battery
7th Arkansas Field Battery	August 6, 1862	Captain William D. Blocher Captain J. V. Zimmerman	Blocher's Battery Zimmerman's Battery
8th Arkansas Field Battery	March 1863	Captain William M. Hughey	Hughey's Battery
9th Arkansas Field Battery	September 20, 1863	Captain John T. Trigg	Trigg's Battery
Company H, 1st Tennessee Heavy Artillery(1st Organization)	December 1861	Captain Frederick William Hoadley Captain William Pratt Parks	"Magruder Guards", Company D, 4th Arkansas Infantry Battalion Company B, 1st Tennessee Heavy Artillery (2nd Organization) Arkansas Artillery
Company B, 1st Tennessee Heavy Artillery (1st Organization)	December 6, 1861	Captain D. Whit Harris Captain Paul Thomas Dismukes	"McCown Guards" Company A, 1st Tennessee Light Artillery(2nd Organization)
Brown's Arkansas Battery	Summer 1864	Captain Louis W. Brown	Newton Artillery
Crawford Artillery	April 1861	Captain James T. Stewart	Company F, 3rd Regiment, Arkansas State Troops
Helena Artillery	April 29, 1861, State Service July 6, 1861, Confederate Service	Captain A. W. Clarkson Captain John H. Calvert Captain Thomas J. Key	Clarkson's Battery, Key's Battery Company C, 20th Alabama Light Artillery Battalion Company H, 28th Georgia Artillery Battalion
Monticello Artillery	February 8, 1862	Captain James A. Owens Captain W. C. Howell	Drew Light Artillery, Owen's Battery
Pine Bluff Artillery	April 21, 1861, State Militia	Captain Frederick P. Steck	Steck's Battery Company G, 18th Arkansas Infantry Regiment
Reid's Arkansas Battery	Summer 1862	Captain John G. Reid	Reid's Battery,
Shoup's Mountain Battery	November 1862	Captain James C. Shoup	Shoup's (Arkansas) Battery
Trigg's Arkansas Battery	July 1861	Captain John T. Trigg Captain Thomas M. Austin	Trigg's Battery Company B, Shoup's Battalion Austin Artillery

== Arkansas soldiers in Confederate units of other States ==
In addition to serving in Confederate units organized in Arkansas, many Arkansas soldiers would serve in Confederate units organized by other states. Because Missouri Confederate troops were effectively driven out of the geographic area of Missouri after the Pea Ridge Campaign, except during raids by Generals Marmaduke, Shelby and Price, many of the Missouri units recruited heavily in Arkansas. This practice led some Missouri units to be mislabeled as Arkansas Units, and some Arkansas units being mislabeled as Missouri units. Troops living near the borders with other states often enlisted in the nearest unit, even if across the state line, resulting in Arkansas soldiers enlisting in units from Missouri, Louisiana and Tennessee. Some Arkansas soldiers were also detailed to help bring Texas units up to strength. The following is a list of units from other Confederate States that contained large numbers of Arkansas soldiers:

Regiment	Organization Date	Commanders	Alternated designations
Company A, 13th Battalion Louisiana Partisan Rangers	July 11, 1862	Capt. James H. Capers	Company I, 2nd Arkansas Cavalry Regiment (Slemons')
1st Battalion, Trans-Mississippi Confederate Cavalry	March 18, 1864	Maj. Thompson J. Bird	Ark. & La. Batt. of Wounded Cadets 1st Battalion, Arkansas and Louisiana Cavalry
Coffee's Arkansas Cavalry Regiment		Colonel John T. Coffee Colonel Gideon W. Thompson Colonel Moses W. Smith	6th Missouri Cavalry 11th Missouri Cavalry
Freeman's Missouri Cavalry Regiment	January 16, 1864	Colonel Thomas R. Freeman Major Martin V. Shaver	
Fristoe's Missouri Cavalry Regiment	July 1864	Colonel Edward T. Fristoe	
Jackman's Arkansas Cavalry Regiment	Spring 1864	Colonel Sidney D. Jackman	Nichols' Arkansas Cavalry Regiment Jackman's Missouri Cavalry
Kitchen's Missouri Cavalry Regiment	April 9, 1863	Colonel Solomon George Kitchen	10th Missouri Cavalry 7th Missouri Cavalry Regiment Kitchen's Battalion Missouri Cavalry
Nichols' Arkansas Cavalry Regiment	Spring 1864	Colonel Charles H. Nichols	Jackman's Arkansas Cavalry Regiment
Sander's Arkansas Cavalry Regiment	September 15, 1862	Edward I. Sanders	Sanders Battalion Arkansas Cavalry 17th Battalion Tennessee Cavalry Sanders' Battalion of Partisan Rangers
Schnabel's Missouri Battalion Cavalry		Lieutenant Colonel John A. Schnabel	
9th Texas Field Battery	June 4, 1862	Captain James M. Daniel	Lamar Artillery

== Home Guard ==
The Arkansas Secession Convention enacted an ordinance on May 30, 1861, authorizing the county courts in each county of the state to appoint a "home guard of minute-men" for a term of service of three months, to include at least ten men in each township. The duty of the home guards was "to see that all slaves are disarmed, to prevent the assemblage of slaves in unusual numbers, to keep the slave population in proper subjugation, and to see that peace and order are observed."

The main reason for the creation of the home guard was to control the excesses of so-called "Vigilance Committees" which had been organized in various parts of the State from about 1859 to 1861 in response to hysterical (and unfounded) rumors of nefarious abolitionist plots and secret underground organizations. There are many lurid stories of assaults and murders attributed to these vigilantes. The home guard was intended to provide a military-style, regulated, accountable organization to keep an eye on the slave population and the activities of suspected abolitionists and Union sympathizers. An ancillary duty of the home guard was to support the Army of Arkansas when called upon to do so.

The records of some of the 1861 home guard companies can be found in County Court records. Unfortunately, the looting and destruction of county court-houses in many parts of the State during the war resulted in the loss of most of the records. The records that still exist consist mainly of lists of appointments (or election in some cases) of home guard members, as well as officer lists.

The term "home guard" was, and continues to be, misused and misunderstood. Legally, the term is not synonymous with "militia," though the two terms were often loosely used interchangeably. Additionally, there is a clear, but not generally understood, distinction between the home guard of 1861 and the home guard of the latter part of the war. The 1861 home guard was strictly an Arkansas show, a creation of the Secession Convention. A new generation of home guards came on line in Arkansas in 1863, pursuant to an Act of the Congress of the Confederate States adopted on October 13, 1862. Alternately referred to as "home guard" or "local defense" companies, these organizations were less concerned with civil order than with military duties. They functioned as a sort of military reserve, military police, and scouts. One of their less popular duties was the enforcement of the Conscription Law. An 1863 letter mentions the Drew County Home Guard using hounds to run down "draft-dodgers".

The later home guards were normally enlisted for a period of twelve months, and were subject to the orders of the governor. As a matter of interest, here is the oath sworn to by the Ashley County Home Guard when they were enlisted on November 4, 1863, at Hamburg. The following was transcribed from the original manuscript held by the Arkansas History Commission, with the original spelling and punctuation intact:

I hereby certify that the members of Capt. B. Tiners company did on the day of there Inlistment appear before Col. Hatthorne and subscribed to the following oath (viz) You do solumly sware that you will bear true allegian to the State of Arkansas and that you will honestly and faithfully defend her from invasion and from all her enemies or apposers whatever, as far as in you power and that you will obey all orders from the Governor of the State of Arkansas as well as from the President of the Confederate States of America and that you will obey all the officers placed over you by them for the space of twelve months from the day of your inlistment or of being received into the service of the State so help you God.

== See also ==
- Lists of American Civil War Regiments by State
- Confederate Units by State
- Arkansas in the American Civil War
