= Reid's Arkansas Battery =

Reid's Arkansas Battery (Confederate)
- Active: 1862
- Country: Confederate States
- Allegiance: Arkansas
- Branch: Confederate States Army
- Type: Battery
- Role: Artillery
- Engagements: American Civil War: Battle of Prairie Grove

Commanders
- 1862: Captain John G. Reid

Reid's Arkansas Battery (1862), was a Confederate artillery battery that served during the American Civil War. Another Arkansas battery, the 1st Arkansas Light Artillery, a.k.a. the Fort Smith Artillery, was also once known as "Reid's Battery". Captain Reid had commanded the Fort Smith Artillery during the Battle of Wilson's Creek, but left that organization and later organized a second battery that is the subject of this article.

== The first "Reid's Battery" ==
Captain John G. Reid had previous served as the commander of a volunteer militia company of the 51st Militia Regiment, Sebastian County, Arkansas, The Fort Smith Artillery. The battery was originally identified simply as the "Independent Artillery" but was later styled the "Fort Smith Battery" or the "Fort Smith Artillery". Following the Battle of Wilson's Creek, the Fort Smith Artillery reorganized for Confederate service and Captain Reid did not stand for re-election, having accepted a staff position. The Fort Smith Artillery elected David Provence as captain on September 17, 1861 and was transferred east of the Mississippi River following the Confederate defeat at the Battle of Pea Ridge.

== Rebuilding Arkansas Confederate Artillery ==
After the battle of Pea Ridge, General Earl Van Dorn was ordered to move his Army of the West across the Mississippi River and cooperate with Confederate forces in Northern Mississippi. Van Dorn stripped the state of military hardware of all types, including almost all the serviceable artillery. When General Thomas C. Hindman arrived to assume command of the new Trans-Mississippi District, he found almost nothing to command. He quickly began organizing new regiments, but his most pressing need was for arms for the new forces he was organizing, including the artillery. With Hindman's first order, dated May 31, 1862 at Little Rock, he announced his staff, including the appointment of Major Francis A. Shoup, Chief of Artillery. Hindman ordered guns, which the United States Arsenal had decommissioned and buried as property markers around the Arsenal in Little Rock, to be dug up and refurbished as best possible as serviceable weapons. Hindman was almost totally destitute of military quality weapons and could hardly arm or issue ammunition to the few troops that he had in June 1862. In July 1862, General Hindman wrote describing his efforts at organization and his need for arms for his men.

Head Quarters Trans Miss District
Little Rock, Arks., July 19, 1862

Major:

I have now at my different camps of instruction in Arkansas and on the march to them, thirty (30) regiments of infantry, averaging very nearly, if not quite one thousand (1,000) men to the regiments. Of these not three thousand (3,000) are armed.
In Missouri six (6) regiments are forming for which I have no arms.
In the Indian country, there are four (4) or five (5) regiments, whose arms are worthless.
I have gathered up, by purchase and impressments, about all the arms within my district. It is perfectly certain that not one thousand more guns more guns can be obtained. Of those that I have, only about 800 are valuable, balance being shotguns and common rifles.
In response to my previous appeal for arms, Gen. Beauregard ordered turned over to my Ordnance officer, Maj. Lockman some 450 damaged shot guns and rifles - and sent me a worthless battery - these I have received.
Curtis is devastating eastern Arkansas - a gunboat and transport fleet is at the mouth of the Arkansas River.
A federal force of between 1,000 and 5,000 is in the Cherokee nation. Another federal column of about the same strength is in North West Arkansas. If arms and ammunition were furnished me, I could do something in the way of defence - without them, I am nearly powerless.
There are old muskets and batteries in abundance east of the Mississippi: I apply for them - The requisitions I send do not cover the fourth of my wants. I have stated the facts. Begging and complaining cannot add to their strength.
Very Respectfully
T. C. Hindman

General Hindman ordered two enterprising young staff officers, Captain R.A. Hart and Major J.B. Lockman to travel to Grenada, Jackson, Columbus, Mississippi and other depots, with requisitions for ordnance and ordnance stores, instructing them to take even condemned articles, and to bring them to Arkansas by the most practicable route. Arms and cannon secured by these two were moved to Gaines Landing on the Mississippi River, where they were loaded onto flatboats and moved across the river between Union gunboat patrols. Apparently this activity did not go unnoticed by Union forces operating along the river:.

HEADQUARTERS ARMY SOUTHWEST,
Helena, Ark., July 16, 1862.
I am credibly informed that General Price has been crossing troops at Gaines Landing below. I hope it will be in your power to send gunboats down to interrupt such a movement. I also desire to move my command, partly on transports; and gunboats seem necessary as convoys on the Mississippi and White rivers.
I have the honor to be, sir, very respectfully, your obedient servant,
CURTIS, Major-General, U. S. Army.
NAVAL COMMANDING OFFICER, Memphis.

HEADQUARTERS ARMY OF THE SOUTHWEST,
Helena, Ark., July 20, 1862.
GENERAL: I have just returned from a reconnaissance down the river. A large amount of ammunition, small-arms, and some twenty-five pieces of artillery were crossed over into Arkansas last week near Gaines' Landing. The gunboats had passed to and fro while this was going on. I took and destroyed some 70 or 80 flat-boats, some of which had been in the business of crossing stores, and one small steamboat.
A more vigilant watch over the river is needed. My advance drove a picket from a picket from Gaines' Landing, and pursued the enemy, killing 1 man. I went 25 miles up the Arkansas River and sent scouts to the road south of it, hoping to intercept the artillery, but it had all passed on to Little Rock.
I am credibly informed that the enemy is arranging to attack our transports with artillery that will be brought to the Mississippi in the vicinity of Gaines' Landing. Some kind of vigilant floating force must be employed to keep this great natural base of operations (the Mississippi River) entirely safe. More unity of action between the gunboats and transports must be had. I speak of what relates to my own operations in Arkansas, the Mississippi being now my new base of operations. I hope your headquarters will move this great river.
I have the honor to be, general, your obedient servant,
SAML. R. CURTIS,
Major-General.

By August 5, 1862, General Hindman wrote to General Cooper describing the improvement in his supply situation

... I have now in camp at this place and Pine Bluff about 18,000 effective men, well armed. I have in camps of instruction between 6,000 and 8,000 men, either wholly unarmed or else armed with guns that are of little value, such as shot-guns, rifles, carbines, &c. The arms brought out by Capt Hart, together with those brought by Gen Parsons, have relieved me of embarrassment and enabled me to make effective the greater part of my command. If Major Bankhead arrives safely, as I think he will, I can then arm the balance of my men. I am waiting anxiously to hear of that officer's arrival on this side of the river.

I have six batteries containing forty brass pieces and one Btry of iron guns. I have a Co of Arty encamped near this place, to which I will give the 8-gun Btry coming in charge of Major Bankhead. By some blundering mistake a box of friction primes intended for me was left at Grenada. I have sent a courier to meet Major Bankhead, and if he has not a full supply of them the courier is to go on to Grenada to request Major Chambliss to send forward those left by Capt Hart.

If, therefore, Major Bankhead reaches me in due time, as, from your dispatch and Major Chambliss's letter, received by same courier, I am led to believe he will, I will have in a short time from 24,000 to 26,000 Inf, about 6,000 Cav, and fifty-four pieces of Arty near this place,

At the same time, General Mosely M. Parson's Brigade returned to Arkansas from Van Dorn's Army in Mississippi in August 1862. General Parson brought with him a wagon train of quartermaster supplies and five pieces of artillery. The quantity of guns supplied led to the organization and reorganization of several Artillery batteries in August and September 1862 in Arkansas.

== Organization ==
The organization of Reid's Arkansas Battery apparently occurred in the summer of 1862 as Hindman attempted to build Confederate forces in Arkansas. On July 17, 1862, General Hindman issued Special Order #29 which directed Captain Reed [sic] to report to Col Carroll who was commanding Northwest Arkansas. Reid was to take four iron guns to be turned over to a Capt Pratt. Capt Shelby or the commanding officer of Shelby's infantry company was to proceed with his company with Capt Reed to Fort Smith. ... Capt Pratt was ordered to turn over to Reed the four iron pieces and will receive from Capt Daniels and Capt Woodruff two guns each. On July 27, 1862, Colonel Carrol reported the arrival of Captain Ried's battery at Fort Smith, Arkansas.

On July 27, 1862, Colonel Robert C. Newton, who was General Hindman's Adjutant, wrote to Brigadier General James S. Rains who Hindman had assigned to command Confederate forces in northwest Arkansas,

You shall have a battery at an early date, as soon as he can have the carriages and cassions made, which is now being done. He desires you to raise an arty Company of 150 men to man such a battery, with good officers and get the necessary horses.

On August 8, 1862 Colonel Newton telegraphed Colonel Carroll, General Cooper and Brigadier Rains to explain Hindman' arrangement of artillery. General Rains was to get Reid's battery, but was directed to return to Colonel Carroll men Carroll had detailed from his command for Reid's battery. General Rains was directed to provide manpower for Reid's battery by detailing men from his own forces.

Major General Hindman relieved Rains of command in October 1862 for "incompetence and insobriety.

On August 17, 1862, General Hindman sent an order to Brigadier General Rains which directed that guns of Captain Reid's company being turned over to Captain Roberts' company. On the same day General Rains reported:

August 17, 1862
Camp Cooper HQ Missouri brigade C.S.A.-Gen Raines
Per Hindman's orders to organize company of artillery with good officers -that company is nearly completed due to energy of Capt Wesley Roberts ... ... a subsequent order has assigned Capt Reid as Capt of artillery. He is in many respects objectionable to the men of the company as well as to myself and I desire that Capt Reid be relieved and Capt Roberts apptd and that I be allowed to nominate the other officers of my command.

Exactly what made Captain Reid objectionable to General Rains is unclear. It may simply have been that General Rains desired that Captain Roberts, a Missourian, command the battery organized from Missouri soldiers to support Rains largely Missouri brigade. Subsequently General Rains was relieved of command by General Hindman in October 1862 for "incompetence and insobriety." Captain Roberts would go on to command a four-gun batter assigned to Colonel Robert G. Shaver's Brigade of Brigadier General Daniel M. Frost's Division during the Battle of Prairie Grove. Roberts' Battery would eventually be designated as the 1st Battery, Missouri Light Artillery.

The state of the artillery belonging to Rains command was included in a letter dated Sept 22 1862, from the Headquarters, District of Arkansas, which described it thus:

His artillery consists of three batteries - two of them are of two 12 pounder each, bronze. The other is of two 12 pounder rifles, bronze, captured at Lone Jack, and four iron 6 pounders, sent from the arsenal here, where they had long been inserted in the ground, as "corner posts". The carriage and harness are much worn. The supply of ammunition small. The horses in tolerable condition. The companies poorly drilled.

General Raines was relieved by General Hindman in October 1862 for "incompetence and insobriety."

== Service ==
By the time of the Battle of Prairie Grove on December 7, 1862, Captain Reid was commanding a 37-man battery armed with two 6-pounder smooth-bore cannon assigned to Brigadier General John S. Roane's Division of General Hindman's First Corps, Army of the Trans-Mississippi.

Brigadier General Roane's Division was assigned on the Confederate left flank during the battle. While not hotly engaged,

General Roane's force screened the left flank of Brigadier General Mosby M. Parsons brigade from Union cavalry. Reid's Battery helped drive off an attack by the 9th Kansas Cavalry regiment which had threatened the Confederate flank. One section of Captain Reid's battery was apparently detached to support General Parsons brigade. Parsons placed this section on his left, protected by the brigade's sharpshooters and Ponders' Infantry Regiment.

== Disbanded ==
Following the confederate defeat at Prairie Grove, Hindman's forces retreated back across the Boston Mountains to Van Buren, Arkansas. In the reorganization of the Confederate Army following its retreat from northwest Arkansas, Reid's Battery was disbanded. On December 24, 1862, General Hindman directed Captain Reid to report to Colonel David Providence, Chief of Artillery at Fort Smith, Arkansas with his battery. Reid was to turn in the guns, equipments, and horses, which were to be turned over to General Frost's and General Fagan's Division. Any items not needed by these commands were to be turned over to the Chief of Ordnance or Post Quarter Master. The officers were to be relieved, while the men were to return to the camp of General Roane to be incorporated with his Texas Infantry, either as a company or returned to their original companies. These orders were to be accomplished no later than December 25, 1862. No reason for the dispersion of the unit was stated. Captain John G. Reid virtually disappears following the break-up of his unit.

== See also ==
- List of Confederate units from Arkansas
- Confederate Units by State
