= 6th Arkansas Cavalry Battalion =

- Active: 1861–1864
- Disbanded: October 25, 1864
- Country: Confederate States of America
- Allegiance: CSA
- Branch: Cavalry
- Size: Battalion
- Engagements: American Civil War: Battle of Mine Creek

Commanders
- Notable commanders: Maj. Charles W. Phifer

The 6th Arkansas Cavalry Battalion (1861 – October 25, 1864) was a Confederate Army cavalry battalion during the American Civil War.

== Battles ==
During its brief existence, the 6th Battalion was assigned to Hardee's Division of the Confederate Central Army of Kentucky, and fought in the battles of Brownsville, Kentucky, November 20, 1861; Rowlett's Station, Kentucky, December 17, 1861; and Shiloh, Tennessee, April 6–7, 1862. As part of the 2nd Arkansas Cavalry Regiment, under Colonel William Ferguson Slemons, the former 6th Battalion troops would go on to establish an impressive record under General Nathan Bedford Forrest. The unit served in the Army of the West and the Department of Mississippi and East Louisiana, and took an active part in the Battles of Iuka, Corinth, and Hatchie Bridge. In 1864, the regiment was transferred to the Trans-Mississippi Army and participated in fought in Arkansas, Missouri and Kansas. The regiment was assigned to W.A. Crawford's, J.C. Wright's, and W.F. Slemon's Brigade in the Trans-Mississippi Department. After fighting at the Battle of Poison Spring, the regiment participated in Price's Missouri Expedition.

== Surrender ==
The 2nd Arkansas Cavalry Regiment was captured at the Battle of Mine Creek on October 25, 1864, and apparently was never exchanged or reformed.

== See also ==
- List of Confederate units from Arkansas
- Confederate Units by State
