= 26th Arkansas Infantry Regiment =

Infantry regiment of the Confederate States Army

- Active: 1862–1865
- Disbanded: May 26, 1865
- Country: Confederate States
- Allegiance: Arkansas
- Branch: Army
- Type: Infantry
- Size: Regiment
- Part of: 1st Arkansas Infantry Brigade
- Facings: Light blue
- Engagements: American Civil War; Battle of Prairie Grove; Battle of Devil's Backbone; Battle of Pleasant Hill; Battle of Jenkins' Ferry

Commanders
- Commanding officers: Col. Asa S. Morgan; Col. Fountain P. Yell; Col. Iverson L. Brooks; Lieut. Col. A. G. Greenwood (acting)

The 26th Arkansas Infantry Regiment (formerly Morgan's Arkansas Infantry Battalion and the 3rd Trans-Mississippi Regiment) was an infantry formation of the Confederate States Army in the Trans-Mississippi Theater of the American Civil War. It was successively commanded by Colonels Asa S. Morgan, Fountain P. Yell, Iverson L. Brooks, and Lieutenant-Colonel A. G. Greenwood.

== Engagements ==
The regiment participated in the following engagements:

- Battle of Prairie Grove
- Battle of Devil's Backbone
- Battle of Pleasant Hill
- Battle of Jenkins' Ferry

== See also ==
- List of Confederate units from Arkansas
