= 3rd Arkansas Consolidated Infantry Regiment =

3rd Arkansas Consolidated Infantry (Confederate)
- Active: 1864–1865
- Country: Confederate States
- Allegiance: Arkansas
- Branch: Army
- Type: Infantry
- Size: Regiment
- Facings: Light blue

The 3rd Arkansas Consolidated Infantry (1864–1865) was a Confederate Army infantry regiment during the American Civil War. The regiment is separate from and has no connection with the 3rd Arkansas Infantry Regiment which served in the Confederate Army of Northern Virginia and is also separate from the 3rd Regiment, Arkansas State Troops, which participated in the Battle of Wilson's Creek.

== Organization ==
In September 1864, the remnants of several Arkansas regiments were consolidated in the Trans-Mississippi Department. There is some evidence that this consolidation may have occurred as a field consolidation as early as May 1864. The 3rd Arkansas Consolidated Infantry was created by combining the following depleted regiments:

- 15th (Gee/Johnson) Arkansas Infantry Regiment
- 19th Arkansas Infantry Regiment, (Dockery's)
- 20th Arkansas Infantry Regiment.

Colonel H.G.P. Williams was selected to command the new consolidated regiment. On September 30, 1864, the 3rd Arkansas Consolidated Infantry was assigned to Brigadier General Evander McNair's 2nd (Arkansas) Brigade, Acting Major General Thomas J. Churchill’s 1st (Arkansas) Division, Major General John B. Magruder’s Second Army Corps, Army of the Trans-Mississippi and remained in that assignment through December 31, 1864. In mid October, 1864, Brigadier General McNair was the Acting Division Commander, with Division headquarters at Camden, Arkansas, and Colonel Williams was appointed as the Division Inspector of Field Works. On 17 November 1864, a union spy reported that the McNair's Brigade and Churhill's Division was in the vicinity of Camden, in Ouachita County, Arkansas. On 31 December 1864, General Kirby Smith's report on the organization of his forces lists the regiment, under the command of Colonel H.G.P. Williams as still belonging to Brigadier General Evander McNair's, 2nd Brigade of Acting Major General Thomas J. Churchill's 1st Arkansas Infantry Division of Major General John B. Magruder's 2nd Army Corps, Confederate Army of the Trans-Mississippi.

On 22 January 1865, Major General Churchill was ordered to move his division to Minden, Louisiana, and occupy winter quarters. The next day, Churchill sent a dispatch to Colonel Hawthorn at Dooley's Ferry and directed his movement to Minden, Louisiana.

Union commanders in the Department of the Gulf reported on March 20, 1865, that General McNair's brigade was composed of the 1st, 2nd and 3rd Consolidated Regiments, commanded by Colonels Cravens, Ried, and Williams, respectively, and that the regiments were made up of paroled prisoners from Vicksburg and Port Hudson. The report provided their location as Minden, Louisiana, with the rest of Churchill's Division. In early April 1865, the division concentrated near Shreaveport, Louisiana, and then moved to Marshall, Texas, by mid April.

== Surrender ==
This regiment was surrendered with the Department of the Trans-Mississippi, General Kirby Smith commanding, May 26, 1865.

== See also ==
- List of Confederate units from Arkansas
- Confederate Units by State
