= 4th Arkansas Cavalry Regiment (Confederate) =

- Active: 1861–1865
- Country: Confederate States of America
- Allegiance: Confederate States Army
- Branch: Cavalry
- Engagements: American Civil War

The 4th Arkansas Cavalry Regiment was a cavalry regiment of the Confederate States Army from the state of Arkansas during the American Civil War. The regiment was designated at various times as Carroll's Regiment Arkansas Cavalry, Thompson's Regiment Arkansas Cavalry, and Gordon's Regiment Arkansas Cavalry. During the same time it was also known as 1st Regiment Arkansas Cavalry, 2nd Regiment Arkansas Cavalry, 9th Regiment Arkansas Cavalry and the 11th Regiment Arkansas Cavalry.

== Organization ==
The 4th Arkansas Cavalry was mustered into Confederate service at Camp Massard, Arkansas, on July 11, 1862, for three years or the war. The unit was composed of volunteer companies from the following counties:

- Company A, of Madison County
- Company B, Originally commanded by Captain (later Colonel) Anderson Gordon, from Conway County, enlisted at Lewisburg, Arkansas, on June 14, 1862.
- Company C, of Yell County
- Company D, of Johnson County
- Company E, of Pope County
- Company F, of Washington County
- Company G, of Benton County
- Company H, of Benton County (Contains many former members of the 10th Regiment Arkansas Militia)
- Company I, of Sebastian County
- Company K, of Franklin County

== Service ==
4th Arkansas Cavalry Regiment served in General Cabell's Brigade, Trans-Mississippi Department, and took an active part in the Camden Expedition and during the Battle of Marks' Mills, twenty-one percent of the 117 engaged were disabled. Later it participated in Price's Missouri Expedition and reported 106 casualties. The unit participated in the following engagements:

- Devil’s Backbone, AR 1 Sep 1863
- Pine Bluff, AR 25 Oct 1863
- Camden Expedition March–May 1864
  - Elkin’s Ferry, AR 3 Apr 1864
  - Near Prairie D’Ane, AR 8 Apr 1864
  - Prairie D’Ane, AR 9–12 April 1864
  - Poison Springs, AR 18 April 1864
  - Camden, AR 20 Apr 1864
  - Marks' Mill, AR 25 April 1864 (4 k, 15 w)
- Dardanelle, AR 16 May 1864
- Pine Bluff, AR 30 July 1864
- Price's Missouri Raid September–October 1864
  - Lewisburg, AR 7 September 1864
  - Glass Village, AR 8 September 1864
  - Arcadia, MO 27 September 1864
  - Pilot Knob, MO 27 September 1864
  - Franklin, MO 1 October 1864
  - Moreau Bottom, MO 7 October 1864
  - California, MO 9 October 1864
  - Booneville, MO 11–12 October 1864
  - Lexington, MO 18 October 1864
  - Little Blue River, MO 21 October 1864
  - Independence, MO 22 October 1864
  - Westport, MO 23 October 1864
  - Marais des Cygnes, KS 25 October 1864
- Fayetteville, AR 2 November 1864

== Surrender ==
During the spring of 1865 the 4th Arkansas Cavalry Regiment disbanded.

== See also ==
- List of Confederate units from Arkansas
