= 7th Arkansas Cavalry Regiment =

Cavalry regiment of the Confederate States Army

- Active: 1863–1865
- Country: Confederate States
- Allegiance: Arkansas
- Branch: Army

The 7th Arkansas Cavalry Regiment (1863–1865) was a Confederate Army cavalry regiment during the American Civil War.

== Organization ==
This regiment was formed on July 25, 1863, by adding independent companies to J. F. Hill's Arkansas Cavalry Battalion. The 7th Cavalry was commanded by Colonel John Fry Hill, Lieutenant Colonel Oliver Basham, and Majors J. L. Adams and J. C. Ward. Many former members of the 10th Arkansas Militia Regiment joined this unit. The unit was composed of companies from the following counties:

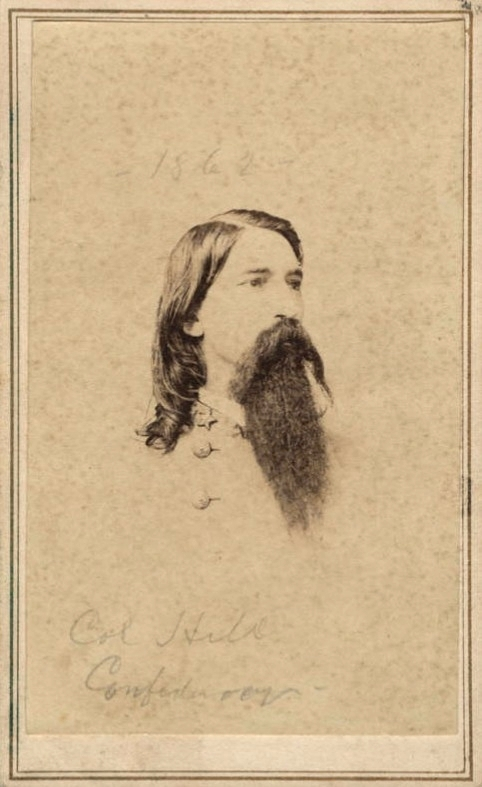
Colonel John Fry Hill commanded both the 16th Arkansas Infantry Regiment and the 7th Arkansas Cavalry Regiment

- Company A – Pope County
- Company B – Johnson County
- Company C – Searcy County
- Company D – Pope County
- Company F – Unknown
- Company G – Madison County
- Company H – Pope and Johnson County
- Company K – Johnson County
- Company L – Johnson County
- Company M – Johnson County

== Battles ==
The unit served in General Cabell's Brigade, Trans-Mississippi Department, and fought in the following engagements:

- Battle of Devil's Backbone, Arkansas, September 1, 1863
- Battle of Poison Spring, Arkansas, April 18, 1864
- Battle of Marks' Mills, Arkansas, April 25, 1864
- Battle of Pine Bluff, Arkansas,
- Battle of Dardanelle, Arkansas,
- Price's Missouri Raid, Arkansas-Missouri-Kansas, September, 1864
- Battle of Marais des Cygnes, Linn County, Kansas, October 25, 1864

== Surrender ==
This regiment surrendered at Galveston, Texas.

== See also ==
- List of Confederate units from Arkansas
- Confederate Units by State
