= 10th Arkansas Cavalry Regiment (Witt's) =

Witt's 10th Arkansas Cavalry
- Active: 1861–1865
- Disbanded: May 28, 1865
- Country: Confederate States of America
- Allegiance: CSA
- Branch: Infantry
- Size: Regiment
- Engagements: American Civil War: Battle of Shiloh; Battle of Baton Rouge; Battle of Port Hudson, Louisiana; Skirmishes, Clear Creek and Tomahawk, Arkansas; Skirmish, Rolling Prairie, Arkansas; Skirmish, Sylamore Creek, Arkansas; Skirmishes near Burrowsville, Arkansas; Skirmish, Crooked Creek, Arkansas; Skirmish, Bayou Des Arc, Arkansas; Skirmish, Gum Swamp, Arkansas; Skirmish, Austin, Arkansas; Operations against Expedition from Little Rock to the Little Red River, Arkansas; Price's Missouri Expedition; Skirmish near Quitman, Arkansas (detachment); Skirmish, Ironton, Mo.; Skirmishes, Arcadia and Ironton, Mo.; Battle of Marmiton (Charlot), Mo.; Battle of Mine Creek, Little Osage River, Marias des Cygnes, Kansas; Skirmish near Lewisburg, Arkansas

Witt's 10th Arkansas Cavalry (1863–1865) was a Confederate Army Cavalry regiment during the American Civil War from the state of Arkansas. The unit was originally known as the 10th Arkansas Infantry Regiment, but was converted to cavalry after being exchanged following the fall of Port Hudson, La.

== Organization ==
The unit was mustered into Confederate Service in July 1861 at Springfield in Conway County. Its members were drawn from the counties of Cleburne, Van Buren, Conway, and Perry. The unit comprised the following volunteer companies:

- Company A – "Quitman Rifles" – commanded by Captain A. R. Witt.
- Company B – "Ready Rifles" – from Conway County.
- Company C – "Choctaw Riflemen" – from Van Buren County.
- Company D – "White County Volunteers" – from White County.
- Company E – "Conway Invincibles" – of Conway County.
- Company F – "Muddy Bayou Heroes" – of Conway County.
- Company G – "Red River Riflemen" – Captain John B. Miller.
- Company H – "Perry County Mountaineers" – from Perry County.
- Company I – "Conway Tigers" – of Conway County.
- Company K – "Springfield Sharpshooters" – of Conway County.

The unit's first commander was Colonel T. D. Merrick, a former Major General of the Arkansas Militia.

== Battles ==
The regiment moved to Union City, Tennessee, where 150 men died from the effects of measles. Later it was involved in the conflicts at Shiloh and Baton Rouge, and in October, 1862, contained 249 effectives. Attached to Buford's and Beall's Brigade, Department of Mississippi and East Louisiana, the 10th was part of the garrison that surrendered at Port Hudson on July 9, 1863. After being exchanged, the men returned to Arkansas and were reorganized as the 10th or Witt's Cavalry Regiment.

The 10th Arkansas Infantry fought in the following engagements:

- Battle of Shiloh, Tennessee, April 6–7, 1862.
- Battle of Baton Rouge, Louisiana. August 5, 1862.
- Battle of Port Hudson, Louisiana, June 14, 1863.

After being reorganized as Witt's Cavalry Regiment, the unit was involved in the following engagements:

- Skirmishes, Clear Creek and Tomahawk, Arkansas – January 22, 1864.
- Skirmish, Rolling Prairie, Arkansas – January 23, 1864.
- Skirmish, Sylamore Creek, Arkansas – January 23, 1864.
- Skirmishes near Burrowsville, Arkansas – January 23, 1864.
- Skirmish, Crooked Creek, Arkansas – February 5, 1864.
- Skirmish, Bayou Des Arc, Arkansas – July 13–16, 1864.
- Skirmish, Gum Swamp, Arkansas – July 17, 1864.
- Skirmish, Austin, Arkansas – July 17, 1864.
- Operations against Expedition from Little Rock to the Little Red River, Arkansas – August 6–16, 1864.
- Price's Missouri Expedition – August 29-December 2, 1864.
- Skirmish near Quitman, Arkansas (detachment) – Septetember 2, 1864.
- Skirmish, Ironton, Mo. – Septemteber 26, 1864.
- Skirmishes, Arcadia and Ironton, Mo. – September 27, 1864.
- Battle of Marmiton (Charlot), Mo. – October 25, 1864.
- Battle of Mine Creek, Little Osage River, Marias des Cygnes, Kansas – October 25, 1864.
- Skirmish near Lewisburg, Arkansas - Feb. 12, 1865.

== Surrender ==
The 10th Arkansas surrendered with the garrison of Port Houston, Louisiana on July 9, 1863. After being exchanged, the men returned to Arkansas and were reorganized as the 10th or Witt's Cavalry Regiment. The unit then skirmished in Arkansas and on May 28, 1865, requested from the Federals terms under which it could surrender.

== See also ==
- List of Confederate units from Arkansas
- Confederate Units by State
