= 10th Arkansas Cavalry Regiment (Newton's) =

10th (Newton's) Arkansas Cavalry
- Active: 1864–1865
- Disbanded: May 31, 1865
- Country: Confederate States of America
- Allegiance: CSA
- Branch: Infantry
- Size: Regiment
- Engagements: American Civil War: Red River Campaign; Battle of Marks' Mills; Battle of Dardanelle

The 10th (Newton's) Arkansas Cavalry (1864–1865) was a Confederate Army Cavalry regiment during the American Civil War. The unit was originally organized from volunteer companies raised from the Arkansas State Militia in the Southern Arkansas Counties in the winter of 1863–1864 after the fall of Little Rock. It was originally organized as Pettus Battalion, Arkansas State Troops but was later enrolled in Confederal Service and Robert C. Newton was elected Colonel.

== Organization ==
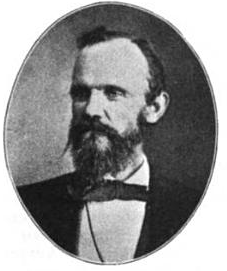
Robert C. Newton

Netwon's 10th Arkansas Cavalry Regiment was originally organized as a group of Volunteer Companies raised from the militia regiments of southern Arkansas, immediately following the fall of Little Rock, Arkansas, to Union forces in September 1863. Governor Harris Flanagin began organizing a new force of state troops issuing a proclamation on August 10, 1863, just a month before the capitol fell, announcing that he had been authorized to raise new regiments of state troops and that by special agreement these new units could not be transferred out of the state by Confederate authorities.

After the fall of Little Rock, recruiting was far more difficult than it had been in the first years of the war. The constant transfer of Arkansas troops into the eastern theater of the war, across the Mississippi River from their homes, was a major objection by the remaining population of men eligible for military service. With Federal forces now occupying the state capitol, the Confederate state government had no way of enforcing conscription laws in the counties behind the Union lines, except during raids by Generals Price and Shelby in 1864. The remaining Confederate regiments were plagued by desertions.

On September 16, 1863, in the immediate aftermath of the fall of the state capitol, Governor Flanagin issued General Order No. 6 from Arkadelphia, which called into service the militia regiments of the counties of Clark, Hempstead, Sevier, Pike, Polk, Montgomery, La Fayette, Ouachita, Union, and Columbia in order to resist the Federal army. The Governor's order directed the regiments to march to Arkadelphia at the earliest possible day. Companies were to be mounted and commanders were to compel persons evading the call to come to the rendezvous. The intent was to form companies of twelve-month mounted volunteers. Only six physicians, one druggist, millers to supply the wants of the country, clerks, sheriffs, postmasters, and persons in the employ of the Confederate States were exempted from the order. In describing this call in a letter to General Holmes dated October 18, 1863, from Washington, Arkansas, the new Confederate state capitol, Flanagin stated that he issued the order calling out the militia, as an experiment, expecting to get volunteers. The order succeeded so well as to get companies organized in the counties where the call for the militia was enforced which resulted in seven companies being collected under the call. Flanagin also stated that "the troops raised by the State are more than double all the troops raised by volunteering, or by the conscript law, within the past few months".

On October 26, 1863, Governor Flanagin directed his Adjutant General Gordon N. Peay to:

visit Lewisville, in La Fayette County, and see Captain Ford, who has been raising a company of mounted riflemen under the State. I have been informed that this company has been sworn into the service of the Confederate States. If so, the only thing to be done is to communicate this fact to General Fagan. If the State troops which can be raised in La Fayette County are already raised you are authorized to disband the militia. If convenient, I would like for you to go to Union County. Captain Holloway has been raising a company of mounted riflemen in that county. If his company is organized, you can disband the militia of that county. If the colonel is inefficient, and Captain Holloway has not got his company formed, let him swear his men in and get the militia together, and compel those who are liable to the conscript law to go into the State or C. S. service.

These new units of Arkansas State Troops were placed under the overall command of Col. William H. Trader who was detailed to Governor Flanagin by General E. Kirby Smith. Col. Trader remained in command of the state troops until he resigned in June 1864.

=== Pettus Battalion, Arkansas State Troops ===
On January 14, 1864, Governor Flanagin, through General Peay, issued General Orders, No. 8. which directed the following named companies of Arkansas mounted volunteers, which had been called into the service of the State under the proclamation of the August 10, A.D. 1863, compose and be designated as the 1st Battalion, Arkansas State Troops:

- Company A – of Hempstead County, Captain E. K. Williamson, commanding.
- Company B – of Clark County, Captain Reuben C. Reed, commanding.
- Company C – of Sevier County, Captain Allen T. Pettus, commanding.
- Company D – of Polk County, Captain G. A. Hale, commanding.
- Company E – of Hot Spring County, Captain John W. Dyer, commanding.

Allen T. Pettus was elected Lieutenant Colonel of this battalion. The unit participated in the battle of Marks Mill on April 25, 1864, as a part of Brigadier General William L. Cabell's Division. Lt. Col. Pettus was killed during the battle and Capt. P.K. Williamson of Company A commanded the battalion until the unit was increased to a regiment and transferred to Confederate service.

=== Newton's 10th Arkansas Cavalry Regiment ===
In August 1864 when the term of enlistment for these state troops was about to expire, Adjutant General Peay issued an order which directed that companies be allowed to vote on the subject of being transferred into Confederate service. However, the chance to vote on being transferred was merely a matter of form because Peay's order also had directions for those who refused transfer to Confederate service:

Men whose terms of service have expired, and who are not willing to be transferred, will be reported to and turned over to the proper enrolling officer of the Confederate States for conscription. Men whose terms of service have not expired and who are opposed to the transfer will be required to serve until the expiration of their term of enlistment, and such as do not then re enlist will be turned over to the proper enrolling officers of the Confederate States for conscription.

On September 5, 1864, the State Troop companies, including Pettus Battalion, were formed into one regiment of cavalry to be designated as the 3rd Regiment of Arkansas Cavalry, with Col. Robert C. Newton assigned to the command of the regiment until an election could be held for field officers. The companies of this regiment included:

- Company A — Capt. Reuben C. Reed, composed of men from Clark County. This company was originally organized as a volunteer company, in the 67th Regiment, Arkansas State Militia, Clark County on October 8, 1863.
- Company B — Capt. Robert S. Burke, composed of men from Montgomery County.
- Company C — Capt. Cyrus K. Holman (replaced Allen T. Pettus), composed of men from Sever County.
- Company D — Capt. James B. Williamson, composed of men from Polk County.
- Company E — Capt. Samuel Ogden (replaced P.K. Williamson), composed of men from Hempstead County.
- Company F — Capt. Theophilus G. Henley, composed of men from Hempstead County.
- Company G — Capt. George A. Hale, composed of men from Polk County.
- Company H — Capt. William C. Corcoran, composed of men from Scott County.
- Company I — Capt. Allen A. McDonald (replaced John W. Dyer), composed of men from Hot Spring County.
- Company K — Capt. John Connally, composed of men from Yell County. This company was originally organized as a volunteer company, in the 26th Regiment, Arkansas State Militia, Yell, County on October 8, 1863.

This unit was mustered into the Confederate Service on the October 31, 1864, as the 10th Arkansas Cavalry Regiment. Col. Newton was elected Regimental Commander.

== Battles ==
The unit operated in the Arkansas River Valley, interdicting the supply route between Little Rock and Fort Smith during the winter of 1864 to 1865.

- Red River Campaign, Arkansas March–May, 1864.
- Battle of Marks' Mills, Arkansas, April 25, 1864.
- Battle of Dardanelle, Arkansas, January 14 and 17, 1865.

== Surrender ==
It appears that rather than surrender, the regiment simply disbanded. It served until May 31, 1865, when the encampment, which was near Dooleys Ferry, in Hempstead County, Arkansas, was abandoned, most of the men having been given furloughs to go home and cut wheat.

== See also ==
- List of Confederate units from Arkansas
- Confederate Units by State
