= Battle of Wilson's Creek order of battle: Confederate =

The following Confederate States Army units and commanders fought in the Battle of Wilson's Creek of the American Civil War, fought on August 10, 1861, near Springfield, Missouri. Though identified with the Confederates, the Missouri State Guard were technically an independent army, as Missouri had not yet seceded, and were not folded into the Confederate Army of the West until March 17, 1862. Though identified with the Confederates, the Arkansas State Troops were technically not yet Confederate troops. Arkansas had seceded on May 6, 1861, and been recognized as a Confederate State, but Brigadier General Nicholas Pearce's troops had not been transferred from the State of Arkansas to the Confederate Government and had not been sworn into Confederate Service. After the battle, Pearce's troops voted to disband rather than enter Confederate Service.

The Union order of battle is shown separately.

== Abbreviations used ==
=== Military rank ===
- BG = Brigadier General
- Col = Colonel
- Ltc = Lieutenant Colonel
- Maj = Major
- Cpt = Captain

=== Other ===
- k = killed
- w = wounded

== Confederate Forces at Wilson's Creek ==
BG Benjamin McCulloch

=== Western Army ===
BG Benjamin McCulloch

Brigade	Regiments and Others
McCulloch's Brigade BG Benjamin McCulloch; Col James M. McIntosh	3rd Louisiana Infantry: Col Louis Hebert; 3rd Arkansas Infantry Battalion: Ltc Dandridge McRae; 1st Arkansas Mounted Rifles: Col Thomas J. Churchill; 2nd Arkansas Mounted Rifles: Col James M. McIntosh, Ltc Benjamin T. Embry; South Kansas-Texas Mounted Regiment (3rd Texas Cavalry): Col Elkanah Greer
Pearce's Division, Arkansas State Troops BG Nicholas Bartlett Pearce	1st Arkansas Cavalry: Col De Rosey Carroll; Carroll's Cavalry: Cpt Charles Carroll; 3rd Regiment, Arkansas State Troops: Col John R. Gratiot; 4th Regiment, Arkansas State Troops: Col James D. Walker (ill), Col Frank A. Rector; 5th Regiment, Arkansas State Troops: Col Thomas P. Dockery; Woodruff's Battery: Cpt William E. Woodruff, Jr.; Reid's Battery: Cpt John G. Reid

=== Missouri State Guard ===
MG Sterling Price (w)

Division	Brigade	Regiments and Others
Second Division; BG James S. Rains	Infantry Brigade Col Richard Hanson Weightman (k)	1st Missouri State Guard Infantry; 2nd Missouri State Guard Infantry; 3rd Missouri State Guard Infantry; 4th Missouri State Guard Infantry
Second Division; BG James S. Rains	Cavalry Brigade Col James Cawthorn	Peyton's Cavalry; McCowen's Cavalry; Hunter's Cavalry
Second Division; BG James S. Rains	Artillery	Bledsoe's Battery: Cpt Hiram Bledsoe
Third Division BG John Bullock Clark, Jr.	commanded directly	Burbridge's Infantry: Col John Q. Burbridge; Major's Cavalry: Ltc James P. Major
Fourth Division BG William Y. Slack	commanded directly	Hughes' Infantry: Col John T. Hughes; Thornton's Infantry: Maj John C.C. Thornton; Rives' Cavalry: Col Benjamin A. Rives
Sixth Division BG Mosby M. Parsons	commanded directly	Kelly's Infantry: Col Joseph M. Kelly; Brown's Cavalry: Col Ben Browne; Guibor's Battery: Cpt Henry Guibor, Lt William P. Barlow
Seventh Division BG James H. McBride	commanded directly	Wingo's Infantry: Col Edmund T. Wingo; Foster's Infantry: Col John A. Foster; Campbell's Cavalry: Cpt A.J. Campbell

== See also ==
- Missouri in the American Civil War
- List of Arkansas Civil War Confederate units
- Arkansas Militia in the Civil War
