= Battle of Wilson's Creek order of battle =

The order of battle for the Battle of Wilson's Creek (also known as the Battle of Oak Hills) includes:

- Battle of Wilson's Creek order of battle: Confederate
- Battle of Wilson's Creek order of battle: Union
