= Thomas Pleasant Dockery =

Thomas P. Dockery
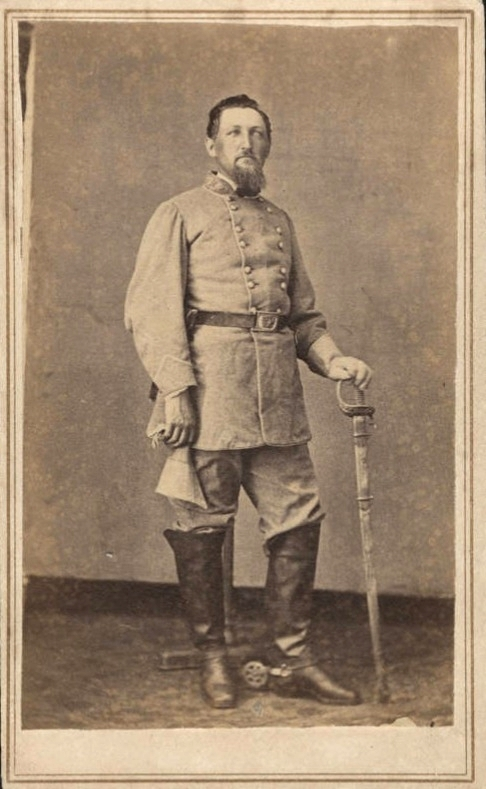
- Dockery in uniform, c. 1864
- Born: December 18, 1833; Montgomery County, North Carolina, U.S.
- Died: February 26, 1898 (aged 64) New York, New York, U.S.
- Buried: City Cemetery, Natchez, Mississippi, U.S. 31°34′30.0″N 91°23′39.3″W
- Allegiance: Confederate States
- Branch: Confederate States Army
- Service years: 1861–1865
- Rank: Brigadier-General
- Commands: 19th Arkansas Infantry (1862-63); Dockery's Brigade (1863-65)
- Conflicts: American Civil War: Battle of Wilson's Creek; Battle of Pea Ridge; Second Battle of Corinth; Battle of Port Gibson; Battle of Champion Hill; Battle of Big Black River; Siege of Vicksburg (POW); Battle of Mount Elba; Battle of Prairie D'Ane; Battle of Poison Spring; Battle of Marks' Mills; Battle of Jenkins' Ferry

Thomas Pleasant Dockery (December 18, 1833 – February 26, 1898) was a Brigadier-General of the Confederate States Army who served in both the Western and Trans-Mississippi theaters of the American Civil War.

== Early life ==
Thomas Pleasant Dockery was born in Montgomery County, North Carolina, to Colonel John Dockery, who had participated in the Indian removals in North Carolina. His father moved first to Hardeman County, Tennessee, and then to Columbia County, Arkansas, where he established a large plantation. John Dockery also played a role in establishing the first railroad in Arkansas.

== American Civil War ==
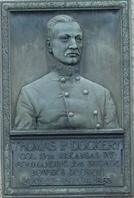
Commemorative plaque image at the Vicksburg National Military Park (2015)

At the outbreak of the American Civil War, Dockery received a commission on June 17, 1861, as captain of a Volunteer Militia Company in the 68th Regiment, Arkansas State Militia, Columbia County. This company became Company B of the 5th Regiment, Arkansas State Troops, and Dockery was elected colonel of the new regiment. Dockery's regiment was assigned to Nicholas Bartlett Pearce's Division, Arkansas State Troops, and participated in the Battle of Wilson's Creek, August 10, 1861. Pearce's Division of State Troops, voted to disband following the battle, rather than be transferred to Confederate Service.

Dockery then helped raise and was elected Colonel of the 19th Arkansas Infantry Regiment. After the Battle of Pea Ridge, most Confederate units were withdrawn from Arkansas to the east side of the Mississippi River. Dockery and his unit participated in the Second Battle of Corinth. Dockery commanded the 19th Arkansas Infantry in Martin E. Green's 2nd Brigade in John S. Bowen's Division during the Vicksburg campaign. The brigade was involved in heavy fighting at the Battle of Port Gibson on May 1, 1863, losing 222 casualties, and the Battle of Champion's Hill on 16 May, losing 268 casualties. At the Battle of Big Black River Bridge on May 17, the brigade was overrun, losing one killed, nine wounded, and 1,012 captured. When Green was killed during the Siege of Vicksburg, Dockery assumed command of the brigade.

Dockery was captured when the city capitulated on July 4, 1864. After being paroled, Dockery was ordered by Confederate Secretary of War J.A. Seddon to assemble the Arkansas Confederate prisoners who had been released following the surrender of Vicksburg and Port Hudson at Washington, Arkansas, in the Trans-Mississippi Department. He was to reform them and recruit the units up to a full brigade.

On August 10, 1864, Dockery received his commission as a brigadier-general and raised an Arkansas brigade, which he led in the Red River Campaign and participated in the Battle of Mount Elba, Battle of Prairie D'Ane, Battle of Poison Spring Battle of Marks' Mills and the Battle of Jenkins' Ferry. During this campaign, Dockery commanded a brigade in Fagan's cavalry division. The brigade consisted of the 18th Arkansas, 19th Arkansas, and 20th Arkansas Mounted Infantry Regiments, and the 12th Arkansas Infantry Battalion (mounted).

Late in 1864, Dockery was assigned to command the Reserve Forces of the State of Arkansas. In May 1865 Dockery signed the instrument of surrender which surrendered all remaining Confederate forces in Arkansas.

== Later life ==
Dockery died on February 26, 1898, in New York City and was buried in Natchez's city cemetery.

== See also ==
- List of American Civil War generals (Confederate)
