= 5th Regiment, Arkansas State Troops =

- Active: 1861
- Disbanded: August 1861
- Country: Confederate States
- Allegiance: Arkansas
- Branch: Infantry
- Engagements: American Civil War: Battle of Wilson's Creek

The 5th Regiment, Arkansas State Troops (1861) was an Arkansas State infantry regiment that served during the American Civil War. Formed in mid-1861, the regiment was assigned to the command of Brigadier General Nicholas Bartlett Pearce, commander, 1st Division, Provisional Army of Arkansas. It was disbanded after the Battle of Wilson's Creek in August 1861. Another Arkansas unit also had the designation 5th Arkansas, the 5th Arkansas Infantry Regiment which belonged to the Confederate Army of Tennessee. There is no connection between the two units.

== Organization ==
In the spring of 1861, as the secession crisis deepened, many additional volunteer companies were being formed in the Arkansas State Militia. The Militia Law of Arkansas as published in 1860 provided for a two-tiered militia system. Section one of the law made all able-bodied free white male inhabitants between the ages of 18 and 45 liable for service. Section 57 of the Militia Act established the second tier of militia organization, the volunteer company. The act allowed each county to raise up to four volunteer companies. These volunteer companies were to be either infantry, riflemen, cavalry, or artillery. While the volunteer companies were to be separate from the regular militia units, they remained under the supervision and authority of the local militia regimental commander, who was required to set the time and place of the election of officers for volunteer companies and certify their election to the governor. Volunteer Companies were allowed to select and acquire their own uniforms and their officers were authorized to wear the uniform of the company. While the standard militia units were organized into lettered companies organized roughly along township boundaries, volunteer companies usually adopted colorful names to set them apart. One example of the volunteer militia company is the ""Bell Point Guards", which would eventually become Company G of the 5th Regiment, Arkansas State Troops. The unit was originally organized on July 10, 1860, in the 51st Regiment, Arkansas State Militia, of Sebastian County. The unit was composed primarily of German immigrants from Sebastian County.

In a letter "To The Militiamen Of The State Of Arkansas" dated August 27, 1860, Governor Conway exhorted the raising of additional volunteer companies: He commented that if all the volunteer companies authorized by the act were to be raised, the state would have a force of 22,000 volunteers.

Although several volunteer companies were already in existence at various locations around the state, the Governor's call sparked a wave of formations. State newspapers in the summer and fall of 1860 contain several stories of volunteer companies being formed, drilling, and participating in the regular muster of the militia regiments. The leaders of these volunteer companies began to search for uniforms and equipment, often requesting them through militia channels to the Governor, but then turning to private sources when the State Government was unable to help. The state legislature responded to the need for arms and equipment in January 1861 by appropriating $100,000 for the arming and equipping of the militia being formed into volunteer companies. Act Number 192, which was approved on January 21, 1861, appropriated money "for the purpose of arming the volunteer militia of this state, when formed into volunteer military companies..."

In the beginning, these volunteer militia companies continued to operate under the authority of the local militia commander, with the local regimental commander overseeing the election of officers and forwarding the election results to the Governor. After the state actually seceded in May 1861, new volunteer companies would be organized under the authority of the State Military Board, and began to be organized into volunteer regiments which would be referred to as the Arkansas State Troops.

The Star Company of Sevier County and the Davis Blues of Hempstead County are examples of these volunteer companies organized under the militia laws in southwest Arkansas. The Stars formed in April, the Blues were organized at Nashville, Arkansas, on June 18, 1861. On the following day, June 19, the Nashville community hosted the Davis Blues to a going away gathering, together with a barbecue dinner and other gifts of clothing and such. The Honorable Charles B. Mitchel of nearby Washington, Arkansas, former U. S. Senator, now a Confederate Senator from Arkansas, spoke at the gathering. That afternoon the Blues, under the command of Captain Joseph L. Neal, left for Little Rock, arriving about June 23. The unit soon moved to Camp Walker, in Benton County, and were mustered into the 5th Regiment, Arkansas State Troops as Company F for the period of 90 days. The Sevier Stars, under of Captain John G. McKean, apparently marched north from Sevier Co. to Camp Walker after this and were mustered into the 5th Regiment, Arkansas State Troops as Company H. Following democratic guidelines, an election of officers was held, in which Thomas P. Dockery was selected to command this new regiment with Captain Joseph L. Neal as the lieutenant colonel. In the Davis Blues, Augusta S. Hutchinson, a man of strong military training was elected to replace Lieutenant Colonel Neal.

Immediately following secession, the Arkansas Succession Convention created the Provisional Army of Arkansas. The Provisional Army was to consist of two divisions, the 1st Division in the western part of the state was to be commanded by Brigadier General Pearce, and the 2nd Division in the eastern half of the state, commanded by Major General James Yell. The intent of the Secession Convention was to transfer these state troop regiments into Confederate service as quickly as possible, to avoid the cost of paying for a large state army. The troops of the eastern division were transferred to the command of Brigadier General William J. Hardee in July 1861, but the troops of the western division under Brigadier General Pearce were not transferred to Confederate service before they became engaged in the Battle of Wilson's Creek. The 5th Regiment, Arkansas State Troops was composed of the following volunteer companies:

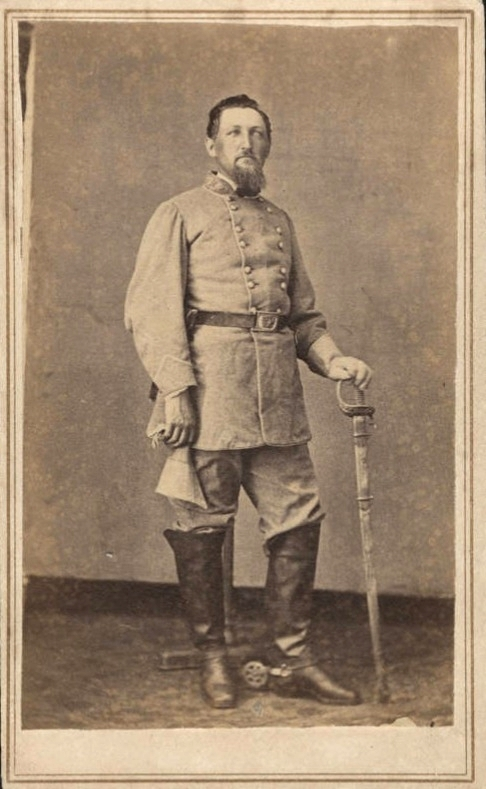
Tom P. Dockery

Company A, of Franklin County, commanded by Captain John Randolph Titsworth; This company was organized on June 7, 1861, as a volunteer company of cavalry from the 7th Regiment, Arkansas State Militia.
Company B, "Invincible Guards", of Columbia County, commanded by Captain William H. Dismukes; This company was originally organized on June 17, 1861, as a volunteer company in the 68th Regiment, Arkansas State Militia, under the command of Captain Thomas P. Dockery.
Company C, uncertain county, commanded by Captain Whaling;
Company D, "Yell Blues" of Yell County, commanded by Captain Cornelius S. Lawrence; This company was originally organized on May 22, 1861, as a volunteer company in the 26th Regiment, Arkansas State Militia.
Company E, "Dowds" of Marion County, commanded by Captain James R. Dowd;
Company F, "Davis Blues" of Hempstead County, commanded by Captain Joseph L. Neal; This company was originally organized as a volunteer militia company in the 8th Regiment, Arkansas State Militia, under the Command of Captain Sims McGown [Simeon McCown]. Captain Neal was 1st Lieutenant of the militia company. The company was originally known as the Nashville Blues.
Company G, "Belle Point Guards" of Sebastian County, commanded by Captain W. R. Hartzig; This company was a prewar volunteer militia company, composed of German immigrants, organized in the 51st Regiment, Arkansas State Militia.
Company H, "Sevier County Stars" of Sevier County, commanded by Captain John G. McKean; This unit had originally organized as a volunteer cavalry company in the 37th Regiment, Arkansas State Militia.
Company I, of Pike County, commanded by Captain John Arnold; and
Company K, of Union County, commanded by Captain Ristor.

The regimental officers were:

Dockery, Tom P. Colonel;
Neal, Joseph L. Lieutenant Colonel; and
Dismuke, William H. Adjutant.

The regiment's designation as the 5th Regiment, Arkansas State Troops is something of an enigma. While the unit was designated as the 5th Regiment by General Pearce, the regiment was not mentioned as an authorized State regiment in the Articles of Transfer of Arkansas Volunteers to the Confederate States, dated July 15, 1861. The State Military Board had already assigned the 5th Regiment designation to the regiment of Cololonel David C. Cross in the Eastern Division of the Army of Arkansas.

== Battles ==
Colonel Dockery soon ran into problems with his new command. Apparently in response to a private being slow in obeying a command, Colonel Dockery picked up a nearby musket and stuck the soldier with the bayonet. All the company commanders in the regiment protested this, and threatened to return home if Colonel Dockery was not removed from command. Dockery relinquished command of the regiment temporarily to Lieutenant Colonel Neal at this time. The 5th Regiment, accompanying other Arkansas troops marched north from Camp Walker to join the Confederate forces in Missouri.

After camping at Crane Creek, the Confederates started marching north and camped at Wilson's Creek, about 10 miles southwest of Springfield on August 4, 1861. Gen. Nathaniel Lyon's Union Troops had been active in scouting the area during this period, being involved in a few skirmishes. Orders for an attack by the Confederates on Springfield on August 9 were cancelled because of rain. Union General Nathaniel Lyons, however, marched that night toward the Confederate camp, halting about 1 P. M., when the Confederate campfires were spotted. Part of his command under Colonel Franz Sigel, had been sent to circle the southern camps and attack from the southeast. Sigel was to attack when he heard Lyons cannons firing. At daylight, Lyons advanced and soon the firing was general. Many of the Arkansas State Troops were having breakfast when they heard the opening salvo's as Totten's Union artillery and Woodruff's Pulaski Light Artillery became engaged in a duel. General Price became heavily involved against Lyons, while General McCulloch and Pearce dealt with Sigel, after which McCulloch joined Price. The 5th regiment for the first 2 hours was sent to the right in support of Reid's Battery, from which position they assisted in the capture of Sigel's artillery.

Most of the action was on the left, where the 3rd Regiment, Arkansas State Troops and the 3rd Louisiana were being supported by Woodruff's Battery. Later, General Pearce led a force including six companies of the 5th Regiment being led by Lieutenant Colonel Neal, to assist the 3rd Arkansas. Lieutenant Colonel Neal was mortally wounded in this action, Colonel Dockery resumed command of the regiment. The four remaining companies of the 5th Regiment, including McKean's and Hutchinson's, continued to guard Reid's Battery until Reid was moved later in the morning, at which time they were sent out as skirmishers. Colonel Thomas P. Dockery, filled the following report of the part the 5th Regiment, Arkansas State Troops played at the Battle of Wilson's Creek, Missouri, on August 10, 1861.

Report of Col. Tom. P. Dockery, Fifth Arkansas Infantry.

Headqrs. Fifth Regiment Arkansas Volunteers,

Camp Wilson's Creek, Mo., August 11, 1861.

Sir: In conformity with military usage, I respectfully submit the following as a chronicle of the memorable occurrences of yesterday:

About sunrise an attack was commenced on Churchill's regiment, which was posted below my command and on the opposite side of the creek, about 1 mile distant. Simultaneously an attack was made on the opposite side of the encampment of the main army. Instantly on the alarm being given my regiment was ordered into line, which order was promptly obeyed. Reid's battery of artillery had been posted on the height southeast of our encampment, and the Fifth Regiment of Arkansas Volunteers was ordered to occupy the height as a guard for the battery. We remained in that position about two hours, and there being no indications of an attack from the direction of the position in which Churchill's regiment had been posted, Captains Titsworth's, Dismukes', Neal's, Dowd's, Whaling's, and Lawrence's companies, under the command of Lieutenant-Colonel Neal, were ordered to support the Third Regiment of Louisiana Volunteers and the Third Regiment of Arkansas Volunteers, which had been exposed to a wasting fire from the main body of the enemy (who were posted on an eminence on the west of our encampment)' from the commencement of the attack. Lieutenant-Colonel Neal moved promptly forward, and while gallantly leading the charge he fell severely wounded. I immediately took command of the battalion and led them on to the attack.

I must, in justice to my own feelings, say that Captains Titsworth, Dismukes, Seal, Dowd, Whaling, and Lawrence, and the commissioned officers and privates under their command, demeaned themselves with such gallantry, and made such splendid exhibitions of courage, that while their conduct excited my admiration, I cannot repress an expression of my commendation of their coolness and firmness. Each man did his whole duty, and although fully exposed for fifteen or twenty minutes to a most deadly fire from the enemy, no man, so far as my observation went, wavered, blanched, or quailed, but poured volley after volley into the ranks of the enemy, which soon fell back and commenced a retreat from the field, leaving it covered with their dead and wounded. Captains Hartzig's, Arnold's, McKean's, and Hutchinson's companies were detailed, after Eeid's battery had been moved to a different position, to act as skirmishers, and continued in that service until the engagement was over. It would be injustice not to make some mention of the highly creditable manner in which these gentlemen deported themselves. Each one obeyed with alacrity and promptness the orders he received, and the men in their respective commands are entitled to all praise for their bravery and coolness in the face of danger.

From the reports submitted by the different captains in my command I find our loss to be 3 killed and 11 wounded.

Congratulating you on the result of yesterday's battle, I am, yours, very respectfully,

TOM. P. DOCKEEY, Colonel, Commanding Fifth Regiment Arkansas Volunteers.

Three men from the 5th Regiment were killed and 11 were wounded, but with the exception of Lieutenant Colonel Neal, their names have not been found. The battle raged for 6 and 1/2 hours, resulting in the death of Union General Lyons, after which the Union Forces withdrew to Springfield.

== Disbanded ==
Following the Battle of Wilson's Creek, the regiment, along with the rest of the Arkansas State Troops marched back to Arkansas and given the opportunity to vote on the issue of being transferred into confederate service following the battle. The regiment, along with the rest of the 1st Division voted to disband rather than be transferred to Confederate service. Many veterans of the regiments joined other Confederate units later in the war. Colonel Thomas P. Dockery would eventually be elected to the Colonelcy of the 19th Arkansas Infantry Regiment. Many members of the Sevier Stars later joined Company F of the "other 19th Arkansas", Dawson's 19th Arkansas Infantry. Many members of the Davis Blues later joined Company G of the Dawson's 19th.

== See also ==
- List of Confederate units from Arkansas
- Confederate Units by State
