= Battle of Wilson's Creek order of battle: Union =

The following Union Army units and commanders fought in the Battle of Wilson's Creek of the American Civil War, fought on August 10, 1861, near Springfield, Missouri. The Confederate order of battle is shown separately.

== Abbreviations used ==
=== Military rank ===
- BG = Brigadier General
- Col = Colonel
- Ltc = Lieutenant Colonel
- Maj = Major
- Cpt = Captain
- Lt = Lieutenant
- 2Lt = 2nd Lieutenant

=== Other ===
- w = wounded
- k = killed

== Army of the West ==
BG Nathaniel Lyon (k)
Maj Samuel D. Sturgis

Staff

- Asst. Inspector General: BG Thomas W. Sweeny
- Chief of Staff: Maj. John M. Schofield

Brigade	Regiments and Others
First Brigade Maj Samuel D. Sturgis	2nd Missouri Infantry (two companies): Maj Peter J. Osterhaus; 1st U.S. Infantry (4 companies): Cpt Joseph B. Plummer (w), Cpt Arch Houston; Company I, 2nd Kansas Infantry (mounted): Cpt Samuel N. Wood; Company D, 1st U.S. Cavalry: Lt Charles W. Canfield; Company F, 2nd U.S. Artillery: Cpt James Totten
Second Brigade Col Franz Sigel	3rd Missouri Infantry: Ltc Anselm Albert; 5th Missouri Infantry: Col Charles E. Salomon; Company I, 1st U.S. Cavalry: Cpt Eugene A. Carr; Company C, 2nd U.S. Dragoons: Lt Charles E. Farrand; Backof's Battery, Missouri Light Artillery: Lt Edward Schuetzenbach, Lt Frederick Schaefer
Third Brigade Ltc George L. Andrews	1st Missouri Infantry: Ltc George L. Andrews (w), Cpt Theodore Yates; 2nd U.S. Infantry (4 companies): Maj Frederick Steele; Du Bois’ Battery: Lt John V. Du Bois
Fourth Brigade Col George Deitzler (w)	1st Iowa Infantry: Col John F. Bates; 1st Kansas Infantry: Col George Deitzler; 2nd Kansas Infantry: Col Robert B. Mitchell (w), Ltc Charles W. Blair; 13th Illinois Infantry (21 man detachment): Lt James Beardsley; Home Guards: Cpt Clark Wright
Unassigned	Lyon's bodyguard: Unknown; Voerster's Pioneer Company: Cpt John D. Voerster
