= 1st Cavalry Regiment, Arkansas State Troops =

- Active: 1861
- Country: Confederate States
- Allegiance: Arkansas
- Branch: Cavalry
- Size: Regiment
- Engagements: American Civil War: Battle of Wilson's Creek

The 1st Cavalry Regiment, Arkansas State Troops (1861) was an Arkansas cavalry regiment during the American Civil War. The regiment was organized at Camp Walker, near Harmony Springs, Benton County, Arkansas. The regiment was officially designated as the Third Regiment (Cavalry), Arkansas State Troops by the State Military Board, but was designated as the 1st Arkansas Cavalry by Brigadier General Nicholas Bartlett Pearce, Commander, 1st Division, Provisional Army of Arkansas. The regiment is referred to as the "Carroll's Regiment" in contemporary accounts.

== Organization ==
At the beginning of the war, the Arkansas Succession Convention created the Provisional Army of Arkansas. The Provisional Army was to consist of two divisions, the 1st Division in the western part of the state was to be commanded by Brigadier General Pearce, and the 2nd Division in the eastern half of the state, commanded by Major General James Yell. The intent of the Secession Convention was to transfer these state troop regiments into Confederate service as quickly as possible, to avoid the cost of paying for a large state army. The troops of the eastern division were transferred to the command of Brigadier General Hardee in July 1861, but the troops of the western division under Brigadier General Pearce were not transferred to Confederate service before they became engaged in the Battle of Wilson's Creek.

The unit's designation as the 1st Cavalry Regiment, Arkansas State Troops has its origins in the confusion caused by Brigadier General Nicholas B. Pearce's failure to comply with the numbering system for regiments adopted by the State Military Board. The State Military Board authorized a 1st and 3rd Arkansas Regiment of State Troops. The 1st Regiment was commanded by Colonel Patrick R. Cleburne and was organized a Mound City, in the 2nd or Eastern Division of the Army of Arkansas. The State Military Board had authorized a 3rd Regiment of State Troops as a cavalry regiment under Colonel DeRosey Carroll, and ordered it to join the 1st Division" (actually a brigade) of the Army of Arkansas commanded by General Nicholas B. Pearce in northwest Arkansas. The free-spirited General Pearce ignored the unit designations authorized by the State Military Board, and assigned his own designations, based on when each regiment showed up in camp to muster. The first units to arrive at the designate assembly point were naturally the mounted units which became Carroll's regiment, so the 3rd Regiment Arkansas State Troops was re-designated the 1st Regiment. The officially sanctioned 2nd Regiment Arkansas State Troops, under Colonel John R. Gratiot, arrived at the assembly point third, and was immediately renamed the 3rd Regiment. Thus, all accounts of the State Troops in northwest Arkansas, including the battle of Wilson's Creek, refer to Gratiot's regiment as the 3rd Arkansas. Carroll's Regiment was composed of the following companies:

- Company A – "Pope Walker Guards" – of Crawford County, commanded by Captain Charles Arthur Carroll This unit was originally organized as a volunteer cavalry company in the 5th Regiment, Arkansas State Militia on June 14, 1861.
- Company B – "Sebastian County Cavalry" – of Sebastian County, commanded by Captain Thomas Lewis This unit was originally organized as a volunteer cavalry company in the 51st Regiment, Arkansas State Militia on May 17, 1861.
- Company C – Captain Armstrong's Company of Johnson County, commanded by Captain Lynus Armstrong This company was originally organized on December 28, 1860, as a volunteer cavalry company in the 10th Regiment, Arkansas State Militia.
- Company D – the "Independent Light Horse Guards" – of Crawford County, commanded by Captain Powhatan Perkins. This unit was originally organized as a volunteer cavalry company in the 5th Regiment, Arkansas State Militia.
- Company E – of Washington County, commanded by Captain Thomas J. Kelly. This company was originally organized on May 28, 1861, as a volunteer cavalry company in the 20th Regiment, Arkansas State Militia.
- Company F – of Benton County, commanded by Captain Daniel R. McKissick.
- Company G – of Franklin County, commanded by Captain John J. Walker. This company was originally organized on May 1, 1861, as a volunteer cavalry company in the 7th Regiment, Arkansas State Militia.
- Company H – of Scott County, commanded by Captain George W. Featherston. This company was originally organized on June 4, 1860, as a volunteer cavalry company in the 17th Regiment, Arkansas State Militia.
- Company I – of uncertain county, commanded by Captain Harleston Reid Withers.
- Company K – of uncertain county, commanded by unknown.

== Battles ==
Under the command of Colonel DeRosey Carroll, the 1st Cavalry Regiment, Arkansas State Troops was present engaged at the Battle of Wilson's Creek, Missouri, on August 10, 1861. Unit suffered a total of five killed and 20 wounded in the battle.

Report of Col. De Rosey Carroll, First Arkansas Cavalry.
Camp On Wilson's Creek, Greene County, Mo., August 11, 1861.

Dear Sir:
In obedience to your order of this morning, I have the honor to submit to you the following report, to wit:
The number of killed, wounded, and missing from my regiment on yesterday is as follows:

Captain Lewis' company: 2 killed, 5 wounded. (Two of Captain Lewis' company wounded thought to be mortally so.)
Captain Park's company: 1 killed, 3 wounded, 1 missing.
Captain Walker's company: 4 wounded, 3 missing. (Captain Walker wounded, but will recover.)
Captain Withers' company: 2 killed.
Captain Perkins' company: 4 wounded, 4 missing.
Captain McKissick's company: 4 wounded, 2 missing.
Captain Kelly's company: 1 missing.
Captain Armstrong's company: 1 wounded, 8 missing.
Recapitulation: 5 killed, 22 wounded, 19 missing.

Prisoners: 4 privates and 1 officer brought in and turned over to headquarters.

In closing this report, the most pleasing part of it now remains to be given you: that the officers and men acted well their part in the hard battle of yesterday, for a while supporting the Missouri Infantry amid a shower of balls from the enemy's infantry, mixed with grape from their batteries, hurled thickly around us; then in the charge by flank on the Totten battery; and the execution done in the charge shows how cool and bravely all behaved; and where all did so well, there can be no discrimination. They drove the enemy in retreat from the battery, and it became easy for the infantry to march on it (Colonel McRae's infantry). The Texas regiment flanked to the left on the charge. I had been ordered to flank with it, which we did in short range for our arms, which were discharged into the enemy. I am sure that our conduct will meet the approval of our country.

I have the honor to be, your obedient servant,
DE ROSEY CARROLL, Colonel First Cavalry Regiment, Arkansas Volunteers.

A statement of ammunition on hand, omitted from above report, shows that the several companies averaged less than eight rounds per man.

Captain Charles Arthur Carroll's company, the "Pope Walker Guards," of Crawford County, was assigned as Company A of Col. DeRosey Carroll's regiment of cavalry, however, this assignment should be considered as purely administrative. Historians believe that at least four of the regiments's companies never actually served with the regiment, but instead operated independently under the direct command of the division commander, Brigadier General Nicholas Bartlett Pearce, as scouts and escorts. Captain Carroll made his own report of the engagement to Brigadier General Pearce:

Report of Capt. Charles A. Carroll, Arkansas Cavalry.
Camp On Wilson's Creek, August 11, 1861.
General:
On the morning of the 10th, going to General McCulloch's quarters per orders, learned the enemy was advancing in considerable force to attack us on the north, whereupon General McCulloch ordered me to have my men in the saddle at ouce. Returning to your quarters to notify you, found my men mounting, they having learned of an attack on the south through one of my men, being one of two who went to a spring without permission, and narrowly escaped being taken, leaving his comrade in the hands of the enemy. My company was not actively engaged during the day, but was, under your orders, acting as a support to Reid's battery, as well as a picket for the southern portion of your command.

The loss to the command is one man missing, two saddles and bridles, two guns and aecoutermeuts, and two horses. One of my sick, who was taken, escaped, but without his horse or arms.

All of which I beg leave to submit.

CHAS. A. CARROLL, Captain Company A, Arkansas Cavalry.

Captain Carroll's company had been part of a force that General Pearce had sent to oppose and attack on the army's rear by Union Colonel Siegel. Pearce described the regiment and Captain Carroll's company's actions in his official report of the battle:

Colonel Carroll's cavalry was engaged in a part of the field away from my view,.... I am informed that the officers and men of his regiment did efficient service in charging the battery of the enemy.

for at this part of the field was supposed would be the main fight, and on my return to this part of the field,..... an advance movement (was made) to the east of half a mile by the fourth and third companies of the Fifth, supported by Captain Carroll's company of cavalry, to give the enemy battle, should he desire it; but the Louisianians, under Colonel Hebert, had fully satisfied Colonel Sigel, and he retreated without giving us another chance at him. Colonel Carroll's regiment, though badly fatigued, was ordered to proceed on the Springfield road in pursuit of the enemy, which duty he performed with his usual promptness and ability.

== Disbanded ==
Following the Battle of Wilson's Creek, the regiment, with the rest of the Arkansas troops, was marched back to Arkansas and given the opportunity to vote on the issue of being transferred into Confederate service. The regiment, along with the rest of the 1st Division voted to disband rather than be transferred to Confederate service. Many veterans of the regiments joined other Confederate units later in the war. DeRosey Carroll held no further commands during the war. He was reportedly murdered by bushwhackers in the front yard of his home at Charleston, Arkansas, in 1863.

== See also ==
- List of Confederate units from Arkansas
- Confederate Units by State
