= 1st Arkansas Light Artillery =

- Active: 1860–1865
- Disbanded: May 4, 1865
- Country: Confederate States of America
- Allegiance: Arkansas
- Branch: Confederate States Army
- Role: Artillery
- Size: Battery
- Nickname: Fort Smith Artillery
- Engagements: American Civil War: Battle of Wilson's Creek; Battle of Pea Ridge; Siege of Corinth; Battle of Farmington; Kentucky Campaign; Battle of Richmond; Stones River Campaign; Battle of Murfreesboro; Chickamauga Campaign; Battle of Chickamauga; Chattanooga campaign; Battle of Missionary Ridge; Atlanta campaign; Savannah Campaign; Second Battle of Dunlap Farm
- Battle honours: Confederate Roll of Honor: Private John Campbell for the Battle of Murfreesboro
- Website: First Arkansas Light Artillery (Rivers’ Battery)

Commanders
- 1860–1861: Captain John G. Reid
- 1861–1862: Captain David Provence
- 1862–1863: Captain John T. Humphreys
- 1863–1865: Captain John W. Rivers

The 1st Arkansas Light Artillery, originally known as the Fort Smith Artillery (1861), was an artillery battery of the Confederate States Army that served during the American Civil War. The unit was actually a pre-war volunteer militia company which was activated as part of the Arkansas State Troops and mustered out of state service following the Battle of Wilson's Creek. The unit immediately re-organized and re-enlisted for Confederate service. The unit spent the majority of the war in the western theater, fighting as part of the Confederate Army of Tennessee. The unit is also known as Reid's Battery, Provence's Battery, Humphreys' Battery and finally Rivers' Battery.

== Organization ==
Captain John G. Reid was elected as commander of a volunteer militia company of the 51st Militia Regiment, Sebastian County, Arkansas, on September 27, 1860. The battery was originally identified simply as the "Independent Artillery" but was later styled the "Fort Smith Battery" or the "Fort Smith Artillery". Commissions were issued to the following officers on October 2, 1860:

- Captain John G. Reid
- First Lieutenant William M Hightower
- Second Lieutenant Marcus S. Wilcox.
- Third Lieutenant Archabald Freeman.

The unit was inducted into state service for 90 days' service as part of Brigadier General Nicholas Bartlett Pearce's 1st Division (brigade), Army of Arkansas, in June 1861. The battery officers at the time of entry into state service were:

- Captain John G. Reid.
- First Lieutenant [unknown].
- Second Lieutenant Marcus S. Wilcox.
- Third Lieutenant James H. Reed.

The Fort Smith Battery was well drilled. Captain William E. Woodruff, Jr., who commanded the Pulaski Light Artillery, is said to have watched the drill of Captain Reid's Battery in order to recall the correct procedures for artillery drill. In keeping with the practice in the Confederate Army of referring to an artillery battery by the name of its current commander, the First Arkansas Light Artillery was variously known as Provence's Battery, Humphreys' Battery and Rivers' Battery. The Compiled Service Records of the men are filed under "Rivers' Battery" on Microfilm Roll #41.

Two of the guns belonging to the battery were themselves somewhat famous. During the Mexican–American War, Captain Braxton Bragg had commanded a battery of 6 pounder howitzers. While the battery was under heavy fire during the Battle of Buena Vista, on February 23, 1847, General Zachary Taylor road up to Captain Bragg's guns. When Bragg asked the General what he should do, the general allegedly replied, "A little more grape, Captain Bragg." This event first raised the young captain to national prominence. The very guns were lying in the Little Rock Arsenal when it was seized by the Arkansas State Militia before the state seceded. Two of the guns were issued to the Crawford Artillery, a battery organized in Crawford County by James T. Stewart. The Crawford Artillery was eventually converted to infantry, and two of Bragg's guns were passed to the Fort Smith Artillery.

== Service ==
=== Wilson's Creek ===
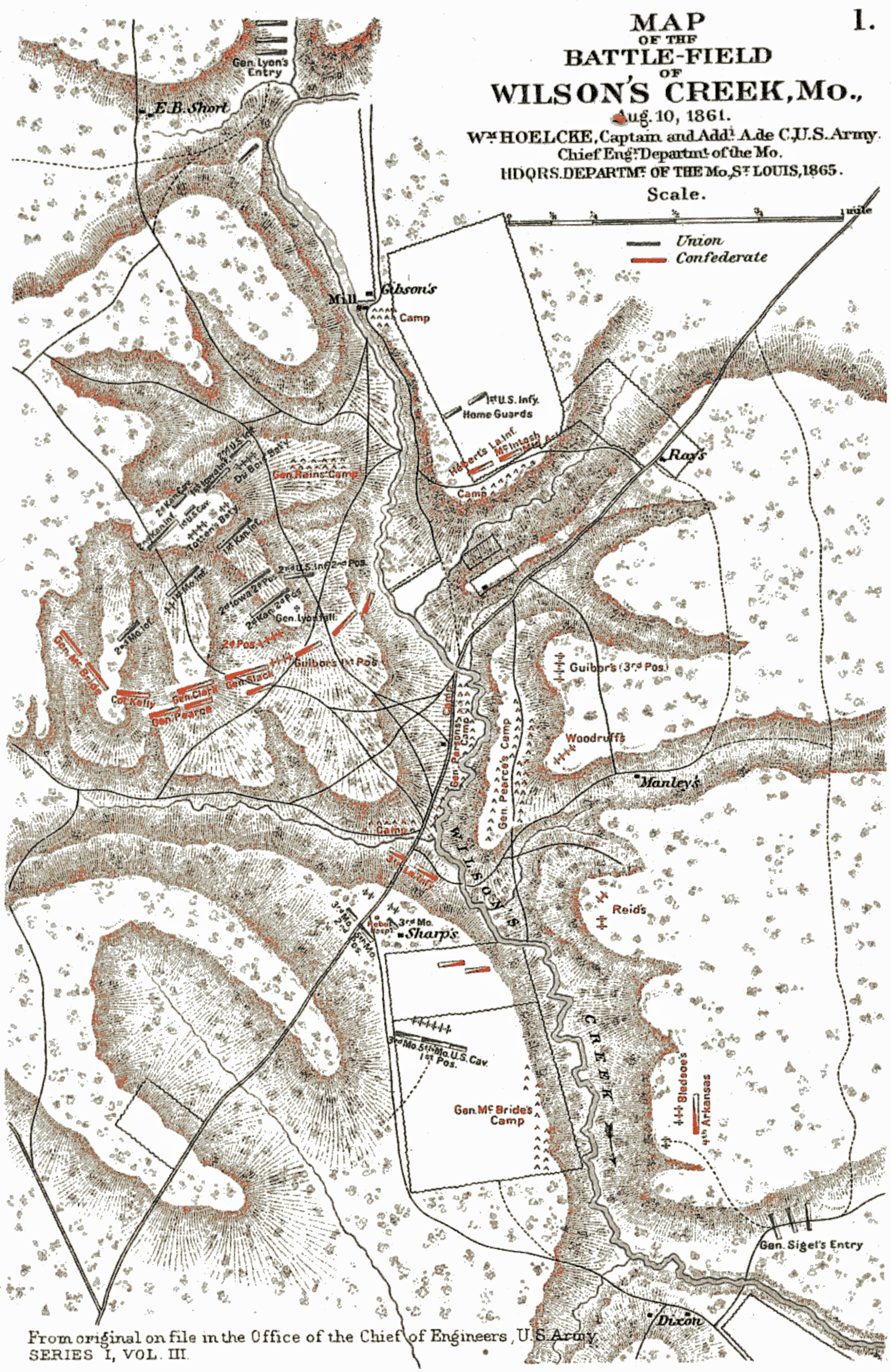
Ried's Arkansas Battery is depicted on the lower right hand part of the map of Wilson's Creek Battle Field. The other Arkansas battery present at Wilson's Creek, Woodruff's Pulaski Light Artillery is depicted to the north of Reid's position.

The ninth day of August, 1861, found the Fort Smith Artillery, camped on Wilson's Creek, ten miles south of Springfield, in south-west Missouri, assigned to the 1st Division (Brigade) of the Provisional Army of Arkansas (State Troops) commanded by State Brigadier General Nicholas B. Pearce. Pearce's Division, comprised one part of the Southern force under the overall command of Confederate Brigadier General Benjamin McCulloch. The other two components of the Southern force were McCulloch's own Western Army, consisting one Louisiana regiment, one Texas regiment, two Arkansas regiments and one battalion of Arkansas Confederate Troops, and Major General Sterling Price's Missouri State Guard.

When notified of the approach of General Nathaniel Lyon's Union force, General Pearce stationed the Ried's battery "on an eminence to command the approaches to our right and rear, and gave him the 5th Arkansas Infantry (Colonel T.P. Dockery) as a support." When Union General Sigel commanding the union left column of the advance from Springfield, came upon Pearce's right and established a battery, Pearce directed Reid's battery to engage. Reid succeeded in getting his range accurately, so that his shot proved very effective." Following the battle, Brigadier General Pearce Arkansas State Troops returned to northwest Arkansas and voted to be mustered out of service rather than being transferred to Confederate Service. The battery was mustered out of State service on September 17, 1861, and all of its members were discharged.

=== Reorganized ===
The battery reorganized after Wilson's Creek, but Captain Reid did not stand for re-election, having accepted a staff position. The battery elected David Provence as captain on September 17, 1861. On March 7 and 8, 1862, during the Battle of Pea Ridge, the battery was assigned to Major General Benjamin McCulloch's Division of Major General Earl Van Dorn's Army of the West. Following the Confederate defeat at Pea Ridge, Van Dorn's Army retreated first to Van Buren and then moved east before boarding river boats and beginning a move to link up with Confederate forces massing near Corinth Mississippi. The Fort Smith Battery was sent east of the Mississippi River and served there for the rest of the war. Captain Reid would later command yet another battery during the Battle of Prairie Grove, but that organization bore no relation to the Fort Smith Battery.

Captain David Provence was elected commander of the re-organized battery. Most of the men originally assigned to the Fort Smith Artillery subsequently reenlisted in Confederate service in Provence's Arkansas Battery (1st Arkansas Light Artillery). The battery retained the name and battery colors of the Fort Smith Artillery, but it was officially referred to as Provence's, and later Rivers', Battery Arkansas Light Artillery. A comparison of enlistment documents between the two units indicates that about three fourths of the original Fort Smith Artillery Battery continued to serve with the battery in Confederate service. The officers elected when the battery reorganized were:

- Captain David Provence.
- First Lieutenant Stephen D. McDonald.
- Second Lieutenant John T. Humphreys.
- Third Lieutenant William H. Gore.

=== Battle of Pea Ridge ===
The battery fought at the Battle of Pea Ridge (Elkhorn Tavern), Arkansas, in March 1862. The battery was assigned to Brigadier General Benjamin McCulloch's Division of Major General Earl Van Dorn's Army of the West. Following the Confederate defeat at Pea Ridge, the army reconsolidated at Van Buren, Arkansas, The battery was assigned to an artillery brigade commanded by Brigadier General D.M. Frost.

=== East of the Mississippi River ===
Then marched overland to Des Arc where the army was transported by steamboat to Memphis in an attempt to unite the Army of the West with the Confederate Army of Mississippi to attack Grant at Pittsburg Landing, Tennessee, but arrived too late for the Battle of Shiloh. The battery would spend the rest of the war east of the Mississippi River.

In April and May 1862, Confederate forces underwent an army-wide reorganization due to the passage of the Conscription Act by the Confederate Congress in April 1862. All twelve-month regiments and units had to re-muster and enlist for two additional years or the duration of the war; a new election of officers was ordered; and men who were exempted from service by age or other reasons under the Conscription Act were allowed to take a discharge and go home. Officers who did not choose to stand for re-election were also offered a discharge. The reorganization was accomplished among all the Arkansas regiments and unit in and around Corinth, Mississippi, following the Battle of Shiloh. Provence's Battery re-organized on April 10, 1862, and the following officers were elected:

- Captain David Provence,
- First Lieutenant John T. Humphreys,
- Second Lieutenant William H. Gore.
- Third Lieutenant Oliver Perry Richardson,

The battery participated in the Battle of Farmington, Mississippi, on May 9, 1862. During this engagement, Captain William Hart, of the Dallas Artillery, served one of Provence's guns as a gunner, Hart's Battery having been ordered disbanded following a poor performance at the Battle of Pea Ridge. Shortly afterward, Captain David Provence resigned to accept an appointment as colonel, 16th Arkansas Infantry Regiment. His resignation was formally approved on June 10, 1862, at which time Lieutenant John T. Humphreys was promoted to captain. The following officers were appointed on July 13, 1862:

- Captain John T. Humphreys,
- First Lieutenant John W. Rivers,
- Second Lieutenant Oliver Perry Richardson.
- Third lieutenant Henry Clay Riggin,

When Lieutenant General Braxton Bragg issued his organization of the Confederate Army of the Mississippi, on June 30, 1862, Provence's Battery, now commanded by Humphrey's was assigned to Brigadier General Thomas J. Churchill's 2nd Brigade of Major General J.P. McCown's 2nd Division of the Confederate Army of the West.

During the Kentucky Campaign of 1862, the battery was assigned to Colonel Evander McNair's 2nd Brigade, of Brigadier General Thomas James Churchill's 3rd Division of Edmund Kirby Smith's Confederate Army of Kentucky. The battery participated in the Battle of Richmond, Kentucky, on August 29–30, 1862. On November 18, 1862, the battery received a large number of transfers and details from the Arkansas regiments and battalions of McNair's Brigade. Many of these men are later listed on the battery's rolls as deserters; however, many, if not most of them simply returned to their original regiments.

=== Stones River ===
During the Stones River Campaign, the battery was assigned to Brigadier General Evander McNair's 3rd Brigade of Major General J.P. McCown's Division of Lieutenant General William Hardee's Corps of the Army of Tennessee. Captain John T. Humphreys described the role played by the battery in the Battle of Stone's River:

... taking position near Mr. Cowan's house, some 3 miles from and northwest of our original lines, opened fire upon the enemy's batteries, some 500 yards distant, in position on an elevation equal to our own and partially concealed by a narrow skirt of timber intervening between our position and his. The enemy's guns (supposed to have been sixteen in number), then firing upon our infantry and other troops in his front, were immediately turned upon us with great precision and rapidity. We responded as fast as our guns could be served, and for more than half an hour drew the entire tire of all the guns on the opposite hill. Two of my guns were rendered useless by ammunition too large, and two others were, during the action, disabled by the enemy's shot, one having a wheel shot off and otherwise injured, and the cannoneers of the other being in the same way disabled. Five horses were killed by an exploding shell. With two pieces (a 3-inch rifle and 6-pounder gnn) we maintained the fight until our advancing lines were charging the enemy's guns, when we were ordered to fall back, which we did, to a point some 300 yards in rear of that position. Eight men were disabled by wounds.

During the engagement there were many acts of individual gallantry displayed, some of which I beg leave to mention. Lieut. John W. Rivers, when the cannoneers at a piece were disabled, seized the sponge staff, and, calling others to his aid, filled the post of No. 1 with energy and determination.

First Lieut. William H. Gore was acting as gunner when he was knocked down and wounded by a shell. He immediately rallied and called upon the men, wounded like himself, to rally to their work.

Lieut. Oliver P. Richardson, whose gallantry on the field of Richmond, Ky., attracted the attention of General Churchill, commanded his section with ability.

Lieut. Henry C. Riggin, after Lieutenant Gore was wounded, was entrusted with the command of that officer's section, and rendered efficient service through the day.

All the above-named officers in this engagement behaved with a gallantry and displayed a devotion to cause and country which should entitle them to the favorable consideration of the commanding general.

First Sergt. William Shea was fearless and efficient. Ensign Cameron, when a part of the flag-staff was shot down, observed coolly that they were "shooting a little close."

Private Samuel M. Tucker had a sponge-staff shot out of his hand, and by the same force he was knocked over, but immediately returned to duty. Private Joseph W. Adams was wounded in the foot and had his pantaloons torn off by an exploding shell. Dennis Corcoran was severely wounded in the neck by splinters from a shell, and reluctantly was compelled to leave the field.

Duty Sergeants Thompson, Casey, Greer, Long, Brewer, and Burket are all deserving of favorable mention for high courage and efficiency. In fact, to do ample and full justice I should have to mention every name on the company rolls. . All were in trying positions, and suffice it to say that no men could have behaved better while subjected to a terrific tire of shot and shell which tore down trees like the whirlwind and scattered them like the lightning.

According to the consolidated casualty report for the Battle of Stones River, the battery suffered six wounded, including one officer and five enlisted men. However, according to the report of Captain Humphreys, the battery suffered eight wounded.

=== Tullahoma Campaign ===
After the Battle of Stones River, the Confederate Army of Tennessee occupied strong defensive position near Tullahoma Tennessee. On January 31, 1863, and again February 28, 1863, the battery in included in the abstract of the tri-monthly return of Major General John P. Smith's 2nd Division of Smith's Corps, Army of Tennessee, and had a total of four officers and 103 enlisted men present for duty. The battery was assigned to Brigadier General R. W. Harper's 3rd Brigade of Smith's Division. In a May 19, 1863, report on the artillery of Lieutenant General Polk's army corps, Humphreys battery is listed as having two 6-pounder guns, two 12-pounder howitzers, and 64 horses, 14 of which were deemed unserviceable. On the June 10, 1863, abstract of the return of the Army of Tennessee, a note indicates that Humphreys Arkansas Battery has been transferred to Lieutenant General William E. Hardee's Corps of the Army of Tennessee.

The Tullahoma Campaign was fought between June 24 and July 3, 1863. The Union Army of the Cumberland, commanded by Maj. Gen. William Rosecrans, outmaneuvered the Confederate Army of Tennessee, commanded by General Braxton Bragg, from a strong defensive position, driving the Confederates from Middle Tennessee and threatening Chattanooga. Stewarts Division, to which Humphreys Arkansas Battery was assigned, defended Hover Gap, but the battery was not engaged in the June 23, 1863, Battle of Hoover's Gap.

By July 31, 1863, Lieutenant General D.H. Hill had replaced Lieutenant General Hardee as commander and Humphreys battery had been assigned to brigadier General H.D. Clayton's Brigade of Major General Alexander P. Stewarts Division.

=== Chickamauga Campaign ===
During the Chickamauga Campaign of 1863 the battery was assigned to Major John W. Eldridge's Artillery Battalion of Major General Alexander P. Stewart's Division of Major General Simon Bolivar Buckner, Sr.'s Corps of General Braxton Bragg's Confederate Army of Tennessee. During the Battle of Chickamauga, Georgia, September 19–20, 1863, the battery supported Clayton's Brigade of Alexander's Division. The battery had two of its guns disabled by enemy counter-battery fire. The battery had two killed and one wounded. It managed to save all of its guns but lost twelve of the battery horses. Following the Battle of Chickamauga, Captain Humphreys resigned on October 15, 1863. Lieutenant John W. Rivers, who had risen from the ranks, was promoted captain, effective October 15, 1863, and commanded the battery to the end of the war.

=== Chattanooga Campaign ===
During the Siege of Chattanooga, in October and November 1863, the battery was assigned to Captain Henery C. Steeple's Artillery Battalion of A.P. Stewart's Division of Major General John C. Breckinridge's Corps, stationed on Missionary Ridge. Captain Humphreys resigned on October 15, 1863. Lieutenant John W. Rivers, who had risen from the ranks, was promoted captain, effective October 15, 1863. The battery continued to be referred to as Humphreys battery in some reports.

As events developed during the Battle of Missionary Ridge on November day, General Stewart received a flurry of orders to move his division back and forth across Missionary Ridge. About 2:00 p.m. Stewart was told to move his division toward the right, and during this movement, his Corps Commander General Breckinridge asked for a brigade and a battery to make a "reconnaissance towards Rossville" Stewart dispatch Holtclaw with Clayton's Brigade, along with the 1st Arkansas Battery under [Captain] John W. Rivers. The temporary commander of the division's artillery battalion, Captain T. J. Stanford, had accompanied Breckinridge, Holtzclaw and the Army of Tennessee's Chief of Artillery, Lieutenant Colonel James H. Hallonquist, on this reconnaissance south of the ridge with Rivers' Arkansas Battery. Upon reaching a point where it became impracticable to take the battery any further south, Stanford directed 1st Arkansas Battery to deploy about 600 yards to the left of the end of Brigadier General Marcellus A. Stovall's brigade "to impeded a flanking movement." Rivers apparently fired on Union Brigadier General John Geary's division of the XII Army Corps for some time until the Federals gained the top of the ridge between the battery' s position and Stovall, necessitation the battery's removal. Union Brigadier General Peter J. Osterhaus' men of XVII Army Corps, had breached the confederate line and were moving north up the east side of the ridge. Osterhuau's men fired on the battery as it retreated, causing it to lose one gun.

=== Atlanta Campaign ===
After the battles outside of Chattanooga, the artillery of the Army of Tennessee was greatly depleted in guns, ammunition and horses. The army withdrew to winter quarters near Dalton Georgia, where the temporary commander, Lieutenant General William Hardee attempted to rebuild the wreckage of the army. On December 6, 1863, five of the hardest hit batteries, Scogins, Massenburg's, Waters, Baxters and Rivers Batteries were stripped of their remaining horses and assigned to garrison duty at Atlanta.

On February 16, 1864, Captain Rivers signed a voucher for clothing received at Dalton Georgia, including 75 Jackets and 75 Pants. The battery muster roll for March and April 1864 show the unit's station as Atlanta Georgia, and the comments on the roll state "the battery has been stationed at this place since last mustered the men have been sober and soldierly in their conduct."

Maj. Gen. William T. Sherman invaded Georgia from the vicinity of Chattanooga, Tennessee, beginning in May 1864, opposed by the Confederate general Joseph E. Johnston. Johnston's Army of Tennessee withdrew toward Atlanta in the face of successive flanking maneuvers by Sherman's group of armies. In July, the Confederate president replaced Johnston with the more aggressive John Bell Hood, who began challenging the Union Army in a series of damaging frontal assaults.

Atlanta was ringed with formidable earthworks, including which were armed with an array of guns including 6 and 12 pounder howitzers, Wiard rifles, 24 pounder rifles and several other heavy cannon brought north from the defenses at Mobile. These guns on Atlanta's perimeter were manned by a collection of six depleted batteries from the Army of Tennessee, including Rivers' Arkansas Battery. These batteries were placed under the command of the Georgia militia.

Captain Rivers signed a requisition for fuel, 1st Arkansas Battery stationed at Atlanta Georgia, May 1864, and the battery strength was reported as 3 officers, 67 enlisted men.

Hood's army was eventually besieged in Atlanta and the city fell on September 2, setting the stage for Sherman's March to the Sea and hastening the end of the war. Two members of Rivers battery were either capture or took the opportunity of the fall of the City of Atlanta to desert. Private Francis M. Brewer is recorded as being captured on September 2, 1864, at Atlanta and subsequently took the oath of allegiance to the Union and was released from prison camp at Camp Douglas, Illinois. Private John O. Brewer was listed as captured on September 3, 1864, at Atlanta and subsequently enlisted in the Union Army.

=== Savannah Campaign ===
General William Tecumseh Sherman, victorious in the lengthy Atlanta campaign, had refitted his army and recently departed from Atlanta on a march designed to reach the Atlantic Coast at Savannah. The right wing of Sherman's force was the Army of the Tennessee, commanded by Maj. Gen. Oliver O. Howard. Union cavalry under Brig. Gen. Judson Kilpatrick was ordered to threaten Macon in order to screen the movements of Howard's column. By demonstrating against Macon, Kilpatrick and his cavalry were able to pin down a significant number of Confederate troops in the city. Unable and unwilling to leave the important industrial city undefended, Southern commanders were prevented from moving aggressively against General Sherman's main columns. This prevented them from attacking and harassing his main columns during the early stages of the March to the Sea when his units were strung out and his supply trains were vulnerable.

The Battle of Walnut Creek, or Second Battle of Dunlap Farm as it is also known, developed when Kilpatrick was ordered to sweep in close to Macon to screen the movements of Sherman's right column, which was starting its turn to the east after appearing to threaten Macon.

Kilpatrick's forces threatening Macon included the 10th Ohio Cavalry, 9th Pennsylvania Cavalry, 92nd Illinois Mounted Infantry, and the 10th Wisconsin Battery. The Confederate defenders at Macon included, among others, the 1st and 2nd Convalescent Regiments, from the hospital located there. General Howell Cobb, who commanded the Confederates in Macon, was blessed with an abundance of artillery, totaling 39 guns. The defense was lucky to have several battalions of artillery, known as the Reserve Artillery, Army of Tennessee, which were left by General Hood when he began his invasion of Tennessee after the fall of Atlanta. The entire Reserve Artillery was commanded by Lieutenant Colonel J. H. Hallonquist. This force included the reserved artillery battalions of Waddell, Martian, and Palmer. Waddell's men had a full complement of ammunition for their guns, but not horses to pull them. Palmer's force had both ammunition and horses, while Martians battalion had a full complement of ammunition, but no horses; as a result most of the artilleryman fought as infantry. The artillery units included troops from Curry's, Bellany's, Guist's, Howell's, Plamers, Rivers, and Captain Edmund D. Baxter's Light Artillery Companies, deployed as infantry. These men were commanded by Captain Albrough. The batteries of Rivers and Prichard were consolidated and the consolidated unit manned four twelve-pounder howitzers. Rivers' guns responded to an attack by at 3:30 p.m. by the Beebe's Battery. Confederate forces brought at least nine cannon into action, some of them firing from the heights at Fort Hawkins, Cobb's forces pounded the Federals on Dunlap's Hill.

Confederate reinforcements poured to the front. As fighting swirled around Dunlap's Hill, so named because it was part of the Dunlap Farm and the location of the Dunlap house, Kilpatrick launched a second attack against the Central of Georgia railroad trestle over Walnut Creek. This advance was quickly blunted by Confederate defenders. As a Confederate counterattack retook the guns on the crest of Dunlap's Hill, Kilpatrick decided that he had accomplished his mission and began to fall back. Confederate cavalry under General Joseph Wheeler was now on the field and shadowed the Union withdrawal.

The battery's muster rolls show that they remained on station a Macon Georgia through at least December 1864. Captain Rivers was still signing requisitions at Macon, Georgia, through April 20, 1865.

=== Battles ===
The 1st Arkansas Light Artillery was involved in the following battles:

- Battle of Pea Ridge, Arkansas, March 7, 1862.
- Siege of Corinth, Mississippi, April to June 1862.
- Battle of Farmington, May 9, 1862.
- Kentucky Campaign
  - Battle of Richmond, Kentucky, August 29–30, 1862.
- Stones River Campaign
  - Battle of Murfreesboro, Tennessee, December 31, 1862, to January 3, 1863.
- Chickamauga Campaign
  - Battle of Chickamauga, Georgia, September 19–20, 1863.
- Chattanooga campaign, September to November 1863.
  - Battle of Missionary Ridge, Tennessee, November 25, 1863.
- Atlanta campaign
  - Siege of Atlanta, Georgia, May 4, 1864, to September 2, 1864
- Savannah Campaign
  - Second Battle of Dunlap Farm, Georgia, November 20, 1864.

In accordance with Confederate Adjutant and Inspector General's Office Order Number 131, Private John Campbell of the battery was recognized for courage and good conduct on the field for the Battle of Murfreesboro

== Surrender ==
Confederate forces at Macon, Georgia, including the 1st Arkansas Light Artillery and Key's Arkansas Battery were surrendered on April 20, 1865, by Confederate General Thomas Howell Cobb to Union Brigadier General James Harrison Wilson.

== See also ==
- List of Confederate units from Arkansas
