= 3rd Regiment, Arkansas State Troops =

Infantry regiment

Third Regiment, Arkansas State Troops
- National Color of the "Pike Guards" at the Kansas Historical Society in Topeka, Kansas
- Active: July–September 1861
- Disbanded: September 19, 1861
- Country: Confederate States
- Allegiance: Arkansas
- Branch: Provisional Army of Arkansas
- Type: Infantry
- Size: Regiment
- Battles: American Civil War; Battle of Wilson's Creek

The Third Regiment, Arkansas State Troops, was an infantry formation of the Provisional Army of Arkansas in the Trans-Mississippi Theater of the American Civil War. The regiment was designated as the Second Regiment by the Arkansas Military Board, but was renamed the Third Regiment by Brigadier-General Nicholas B. Pearce, commander, First Division, Provisional Army of Arkansas. It is generally referred to as the "Third Regiment, Arkansas State Troops", or "Gratiot's Regiment" in contemporary accounts. The regiment is distinguished from the 3rd Arkansas Infantry Regiment which served in the Eastern Theater of War in Robert E. Lee's Army of Northern Virginia. It is also distinguished from a later state organization known as Adams' Regiment, Arkansas State Troops, which was organized in 1862 and participated in the Battle of Prairie Grove before being disbanded.

== Background ==
At the beginning of the war, the Arkansas Succession Convention created the Provisional Army of Arkansas. The Provisional Army was to consist of two divisions: the 1st Division in the western part of the state was to be commanded by Brigadier General Pearce, and the 2nd Division in the eastern half of the state, commanded by Major General James Yell. The intent of the Secession Convention was to transfer these state troop regiments into Confederate service as quickly as possible, to avoid the cost of paying for a large state army. The troops of the eastern division were transferred to the command of Brigadier General Hardee in July 1861, but the troops of the western division under Brigadier General Pearce were not transferred to Confederate service before they became engaged in the Battle of Wilson's Creek.

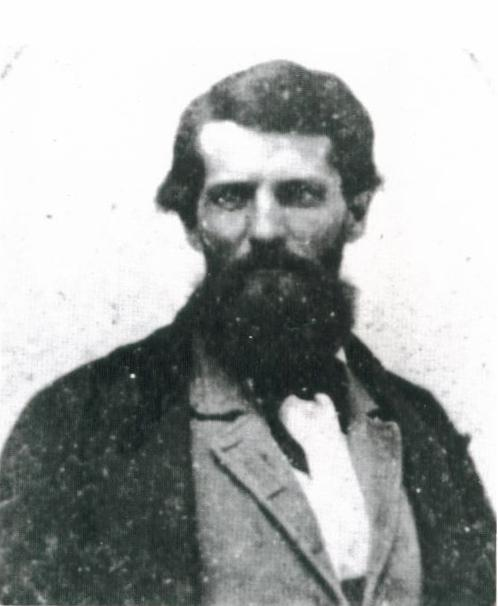
John R. Gratiot

The unit's designation as the 3rd Regiment, Arkansas State Troops has its origins in the confusion caused by Brigadier General Nicholas B. Pearce's failure to comply with the numbering system for regiments adopted by the Arkansas Military Board. The Military Board authorized a 1st and 3rd Arkansas Regiment of State Troops. The 1st Regiment was commanded by Colonel Patrick R. Cleburne and was organized a Mound City, in the 2nd or Eastern Division of the Army of Arkansas. The Military Board had authorized a 3rd Regiment of State Troops as a cavalry regiment under Colonel DeRosey Carroll, and ordered it to join the 1st Division" of the Army of Arkansas commanded by General Nicholas B. Pearce in northwest Arkansas. The free-spirited General Pearce ignored the unit designations authorized by the Military Board, and assigned his own designations, based on when each regiment showed up in camp to muster. The first units to arrive at the designate assembly point were naturally the mounted units which became Carroll's regiment, so the 3rd Regiment Arkansas State Troops was re-designated the 1st Regiment. The officially sanctioned 2nd Regiment Arkansas State Troops, under Colonel John R. Gratiot, arrived at the assembly point third, and was immediately renamed the 3rd Regiment. Thus, all accounts of the State Troops in northwest Arkansas, including the battle of Wilson's Creek, refer to Gratiot's regiment as the 3rd Arkansas.

This designation also leads to confusion with the other, more famous, 3rd Arkansas, commanded by Colonels Albert Rust and Van H. Manning. The Rust/Manning "3rd Arkansas", was not a regiment that was ever officially authorized by the Arkansas Military Board. By the time that several volunteer companies in South Arkansas had recruited and organized, the State had already reached its original goal of eight regiments, so the services of these new companies were declined on the thought that war would not last long. These companies decided to go to Virginia and volunteer their services there. This group of regiments moved to Lynchburg, Virginia and organized themselves into a regiment, and elected Albert Rust as their colonel. They were mustered into service by the Confederate War Department as the 3rd Regiment Arkansas Volunteers. There are those to this very day who insist that Rust's 3rd Arkansas was the same unit that fought at Wilson's Creek, despite unimpeachable documentation showing that Rust's unit was camped on the Greenbrier River in Virginia at the time of the battle.

== Formation ==
The regiment was organized on July 15, 1861. Many of the companies that joined the regiment had been organized as volunteer militia companies prior to secession. One of these companies, the Frontier Guards, of Crawford County had participated in the seizure of the Federal Arsenal at Fort Smith by Borland's Militia Battalion on April 23, 1861. The regiment was composed of the following volunteer companies:

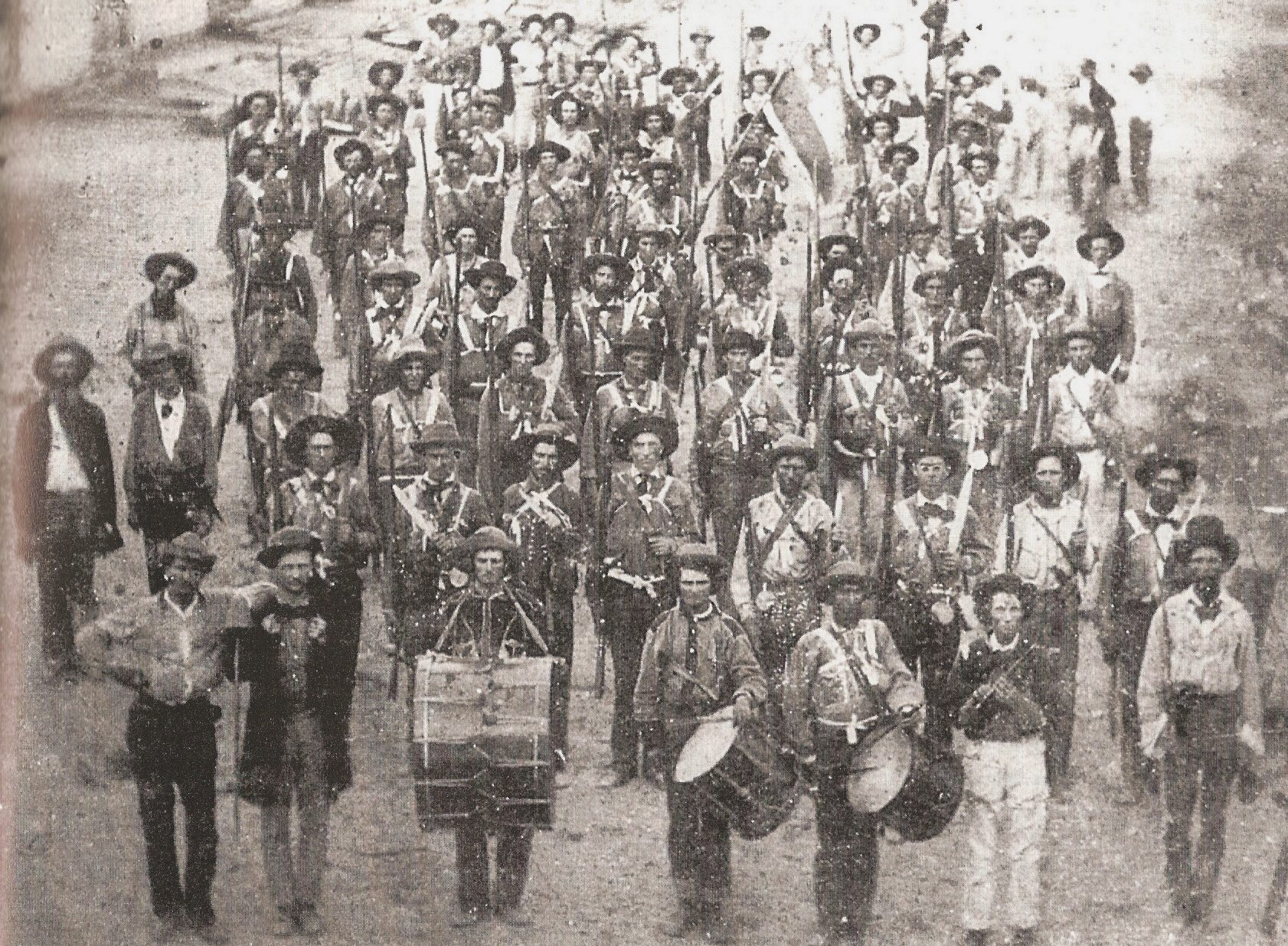
The "Hempstead Rifles" at Arkadelphia, Arkansas, 1861

- Company A, the "Fort Smith Rifles", of Sebastian County, commanded by Captain James H. Sparks. This unit was originally organized as a volunteer company in the 51st Regiment, Arkansas State Militia, on January 12, 1860.
- Company B, the "Hempstead Rifles", of Hempstead County, commanded by Captain John R. Gratiot., William Hart was promoted to Captain when John R. Gratiot was elected Colonel of the Regiment. This unit was originally organized as a volunteer company in the 8th Regiment, Arkansas State Militia, on January 12, 1860.
- Company C, the "Pike Guards", of Washington County, commanded by Captain Samuel R. Bell. This company was originally organized on May 29, 1861, as a volunteer company of light infantry in the 20th Regiment, Arkansas State Militia.
- Company D, the "Cane Hill Rifles", of Washington County, commanded by Captain Pleasant W. Buchanan.
- Company E, of Sebastian County, commanded by John Griffith.
- Company F, the "Crawford Artillery", of Crawford County, commanded by Captain James T. Stewart.
- Company G, the "Van Buren Frontier Guards", of Crawford County, commanded by Captain Hugh T. Brown. This unit was originally organized as a volunteer company in the 5th Regiment, Arkansas State Militia on January 12, 1861.
- Company H, the "Johnson Guards", of Johnson County, commanded by Captain Alfred D. King. This company was originally organized on November 27, 1860, as an Independent Company Cavalry company of in the 10th Regiment, Arkansas State Militia of Johnson County.
- Company I, of Sebastian County, commanded by Captain William C. Corcoran
- Company K, the "Crawford Guards", of Crawford County, commanded by Captain Joel H. Foster.

Either Company E or Company I was known as the "Sebastian Guards", but since both companies were from Sebastian County, it is unclear which company used this name.

== Battles ==
The 1st Division (Brigade) Arkansas State Troops, along with Brigadier-General Ben McCulloch's Confederate brigade, marched north into Missouri, where they linked up with Major General Sterling Price's Missouri State Guard. The combined force then moved towards Springfield, Missouri. Under the command of fought at the Battle of Wilson's Creek, Missouri, on August 10, 1861. On the morning of August 10, 1861, while encamped along Wilson's Creek, just south of Springfield, Missouri, the Southern army was attacked by a Union force under Brigadier General Nathaniel Lyon. The ensuing battle was one of the largest and most desperately fought engagements in the western theater. Colonel John R. Gratiot's, 3rd Regiment, Arkansas State Troops had been held in reserve during the early part of the battle; however, a renewed Union assault on the Confederate right flank prompted calls for its immediate deployment. Forming in a long battle line, Gratiot's regiment charged up Oak Hill toward the Union lines. The regiment had reached a point about 40 yards from the enemy when the Federals unleashed a massive volley directly into the charging Arkansans. The regiment wavered momentarily, as scores of men fell dead or wounded, then charged forward with a roar and smashed into the Federals. After a vicious, face-to-face fight, using bayonets and clubbed muskets, the Southerners broke the Federal line. The unit suffered 109 casualties, including twenty-five killed, out of a force of 500 men.

Colonel Gratiot described the engagement as follows:

Report of Col. John R. Gratiot, Third Arkansas Infantry.

Battle-ground Upon Wilson's Creek, Mo.,

August 11, 1861.

Sir: Early upon the morning of the 10th of August my regiment was summoned by the report that the enemy had taken us by surprise and were upon us. As soon as the regiment was formed it was ordered to an adjacent hill, occupied by Captain Woodruff's battery, to support it, where it remained some hours under a fire of shot and shell. At about 11.30 o'clock a. ra. yourself in person gave orders for my regiment to move on to the scene of action and attack a battery and a large force then forming on the north side of Wilson's Creek, on the ridge, and in the woods. I proceeded to execute the order under a heavy fire of shot and shell from the enemy's batteries, crossed the creek, and marched up the ridge by a flank movement and in column of fours. I advanced until we came near the enemy. We then faced toward them, and marched in line of battle about fifty paces, when we were attacked by a large force of the enemy in front and on the left flank.

At this moment a battery commenced playing upon our left flank, enfilading the entire regiment with grape, canister, and shell. So terrific was the fire, that my regiment was obliged to lie down, and then commenced filing in that position. We remained in this attitude for about thirty minutes, firing with deadly effect, silencing the fire of the artillery and infantry upon our left and driving the enemy in front. We remained upon the ground long after the enemy had fled and all firing ceased.

During the action, I am sorry to say, we were very much annoyed, and some of the casualties hereafter mentioned are to be attributed to the fire of our own friends, who formed behind us and lower down upon the hill, and fired through my ranks after the fire had ceased from the enemy. Attached herewith find a. report of casualties, which will show the heavy fire under which we were placed.*

Of my regiment I must speak in the highest terms for their coolness, prompt obedience, and daring courage, and although but few of them had ever been upon a battle-field, they maintained their position for thirty minutes under one of the most galling fires ever delivered upon regiment by 1,500 or 2,000 Federal troops, besides being enfiladed b; a heavy battery. They stood their ground, delivering their fire with deadly effect and extreme rapidity.

I must here mention in terms of high approbation the conduct of lieutenant-colonel, David Provence, for his coolness, skill, and gallant bearing during the whole action, his example having a powerful influence in keeping the men steady and cool. Major Ward behaved with great gallantry; also Captain Sparks and his company; Captain Har and company; Captain Brown, up to the-time of his death, and Lieutenant King, afterward in command of the company; Captain Bell, up to the time of his death. These companies bore the heat of the action and distinguished themselves by their gallant conduct, and the conduct of the officers and men throughout was so universally gallant and courageous, that it is hard to make personal distinctions.

After my regiment had silenced all firing upon the north side o Wilson's Creek, fears were entertained that the enemy were collecting in force with a view of attacking Woodruff's battery, which yet remained upon the ground that it had occupied during the day. regiment was again ordered to the support of this battery, where we remained until ordered into camp by General McCulloch. As Captain Woodruff's battery was attached to my regiment, I feel it my duty to say something in reference to the services of Captain Woodruff and his battery. The execution which this battery did in the enemy's ranks was prodigious, and its influence was sensibly felt in achieving the fortunes of the day, men and officers behaving with great coolness and courage.

JOHN R. GRATIOT, Colonel Third Regiment Arkansas Volunteers.

== Disbandment ==
Following the battle, the Garrott's Regiment marched back to Arkansas and was given the opportunity to vote on the issue of being transferred into Confederate service. The regiment, along with the rest of the 1st Division voted to disband rather than be transferred to Confederate service. The unit was mustered out of state service on September 19, 1861. Most of its members subsequently enlisted in regular Confederate regiments, including the 1st Battalion Arkansas Cavalry, Griffith's Arkansas Infantry Regiment and 34th Arkansas Infantry Regiment. Some later served in the Indian Territory.

An extraordinary number of the Hempstead Rifles went on to become officers in the Confederate army. At least three of them, besides Colonel Gratiot, went on to become field-grade officers: Daniel W. Jones, colonel in the 20th Arkansas Infantry Regiment; Benjamin P. Jett, Jr., major in the Griffith's Arkansas Infantry Regiment; and Jesse A. Ross, major in the 4th Arkansas Infantry Battalion. Two went on to command artillery batteries: Chambers B. Etter, captain of the 6th Arkansas Field Battery; and William P. Hart, captain of the 2nd Arkansas Field Battery. Another twenty or so went on to become lieutenants and captains of infantry companies and cavalry troops.

== National color ==
National Color of the "Pike Guards" taken by Kansas troops at Camden, Arkansas, in 1864.

Many of the original companies raised for the war received handmade flags which were presented to them in elaborate ceremonies in their hometown before marching off to war. In the first year of the war, many of these home made banners were "1st National Flag" pattern, meaning that they were patterned after the first national flag authorized for the new Confederate Government. The new Confederate Banner, often referred to as the "Stars and Bars", consisted of "a red field, with a white space extending horizontally through the center, equal in width to one third the width of the flag, and red spaces above and below to the same width as the white, the union blue extending blue extending down through the white space and stopping in the lower red space, in the center of the union, a circle of white stars corresponding in number with the States of the Confederacy." The white stripe was a convenient place for the flag makers to embellish the flag with some motto or inscription.

At least two of these 1st National Flag pattern colors were present to units in the 3rd Regiment, Arkansas State Troops. On May 4, 1861, Miss Bettie Conway present a flag to the Hempstead Rifles, along with a stirring speech. This flag, with its stars arranged in three rows of three, many be seen in a photo made of the company before its departure from Arkadelphia.

Another 1st National Flag pattern flag was presented to the "Pike Guards", of Washington County, on May 2, 1861, by Ms Thomas J. (Mary Willis Stirman) Pollard at Fayetteville. In place of the blue union, the flag of the "Pike Guards" has a white field with a painting of the Lady of Liberty. The words "OUR COUNTRY & OUR RIGHTS" were inscribed on the red strips on the front and the words "PIKE GUARDS" was inscribed on the white strip on the reverse side. This flag was allegedly captured in 1864 when Union forces occupied the city of Camden, Arkansas. The flag is now in the keeping of the Kansas State Historical Society in Topeka Kansas.

== See also ==
- List of Confederate units from Arkansas
