= Nicholas Bartlett Pearce =

American Civil War Confederate general (1828–1894)

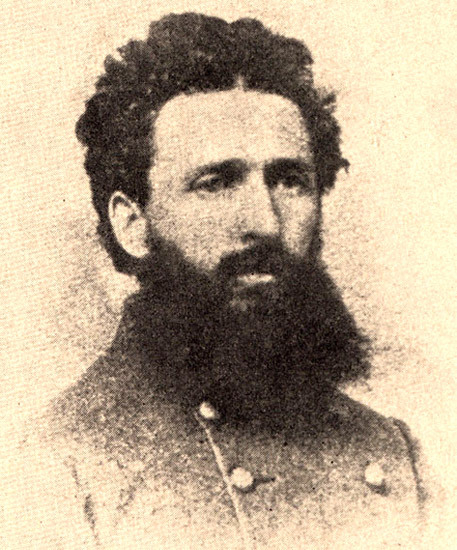
- Born: July 20, 1828; Caldwell County, Kentucky
- Died: March 8, 1894 (aged 65); Dallas, Texas
- Burial place: Whitesboro, Texas
- Military career
- Allegiance: United States of America; Arkansas; Confederate States of America
- Branch: United States Army; Arkansas Militia; Confederate States Army
- Service years: 1850–1858 (USA); 1861–1865 (CSA)
- Rank: First Lieutenant (USA); Colonel (Arkansas Militia); Brigadier General (Arkansas State Troops); Major (CSA)
- Commands: 1st (Western) Division (Brigade), Arkansas State Troops; Fort Smith
- Conflicts: American Civil War: Battle of Wilson's Creek
- Other work: Merchant, college professor, land examiner

Nicholas Bartlett Pearce (commonly known as N. Bart Pearce) (July 20, 1828 – March 8, 1894) was a brigadier general in the Arkansas State Troops during the American Civil War. He led a brigade of infantry in one of the war's earliest battles in the Trans-Mississippi Theater before serving as a commissary officer in the Confederate States Army for the rest of the war.

== Early life and career ==
Pearce was born in Caldwell County, Kentucky, to Allen and Mary (Polly) Morse Pearce. He studied at Cumberland College in Kentucky before appointment to the United States Military Academy. He graduated from West Point in 1850, twenty-sixth in a class of forty-four. He was commissioned a second lieutenant in the 7th U.S. Infantry and stationed in Arkansas and the Indian Territory for most of his United States Army career. In March 1858 he resigned to join his father-in-law's mercantile in Osage Mills, Arkansas. Pearce was elected and briefly served as the Colonel of the Benton County Militia Regiment.

== Civil War service ==
Despite Pearce's vocal opposition to secession, in May 1861 the Arkansas Secession Convention appointed Pearce as a brigadier general and assigned him command of the state militia's 1st (Western) Division. He took command of Fort Smith in June after the Confederate recommissioned the abandoned U.S. Army post. Brigadier General Pearce assumed command of the 1st (Western) Division and had the following units under his direct command:

3rd Regiment, Arkansas State Troops, (Gratiot's Regiment)
4th Regiment, Arkansas State Troops, (Walker's Regiment)
5th Regiment, Arkansas State Troops, (Dockery's Regiment)
1st Cavalry Regiment, Arkansas State Troops (Carrols Regiment)
Pulaski Light Artillery, (Woodruff's Battery).
Fort Smith Artillery, (Ried's Battery)

Brigadier General Pearce, who lived in Benton County, established the headquarters, 1st Division, Provisional Army of Arkansas at Camp Walker at Maysville. Thus when a Union army began operating around Springfield in Southwest Missouri, Pearce's state troops were nearby. Pearce's troops, which are referred to as a brigade of State Troops in the official accounts of the battle, numbered 2,234 troops. Pearce agreed to co-operate with Brigadier General Benjamin McCulloch and his force of about 8,000 other soldiers from several commands, to form a sizable force and immediately marched toward Springfield. On August 10, 1861, Brigadier General Nathaniel Lyon, the forceful commander of Union troops in Missouri, attacked the Confederates.

The Battle of Wilson's Creek came to an abrupt and inglorious halt when the Union commander was killed. Leaderless and outnumbered five-to-one, the bluecoats fled the battlefield. The Arkansas troops played a role in winning the battle, but paid a heavy price for victory. Two Arkansas units suffered particularly heavy casualties. Colonel Thomas J. Churchill's 1st Arkansas Mounted Rifles counted 42 killed and 155 wounded out of 600 men. Colonel John Gratiot's 3rd Arkansas Infantry, State Troops suffered 109 casualties, including 25 killed, out of a force of 500 men.

Pearce's brief and contentious leadership came to an end shortly after the battle, when in August, Arkansas officials sought to transfer his brigade to Confederate service. The troops under Pearce were surveyed on their willingness to join the Confederate command as previously agreed before the battle. Brig. Gen. Pearce actively opposed the idea of joining the Confederate States Army. Historical accounts vary on the number of Arkansas state troops who consented to the transfer. It appears that few were willing to continue in either service. Several units signed petitions requesting that General Pearce be allowed to remain in command. By the end of September 1861, all organized state troops had either been transferred to Confederate command or mustered out of state service.

From December 13, 1861, to the end of the war, Pearce served as a major in the Confederate Commissary Department in Arkansas, the Indian Territory, and Texas. On June 21, 1865, he was paroled in Houston, Texas. He then went to Washington, D.C., and secured a pardon from President Andrew Johnson.

== Post-war career ==
Pearce returned to Osage Mills in 1867 to rebuild his home, mill, and store. In 1872 he left to teach mathematics at the University of Arkansas, resigning this position in 1874 and returning to Osage Mills. From 1870 to 1884 he was employed by a Kansas City wholesale house. Later he moved to Texas for his wife's health and worked as a land examiner.

N. Bart Pearce died in Dallas, Texas, on March 8, 1894, at the home of his daughter-in-law. He is buried in Whitesboro, Texas.

== See also ==
- List of American Civil War generals (Acting Confederate)

== Notes ==
- Service Profile
