= Battle of Wilson's Creek =

1861 battle of the American Civil War

- Part of the American Civil War
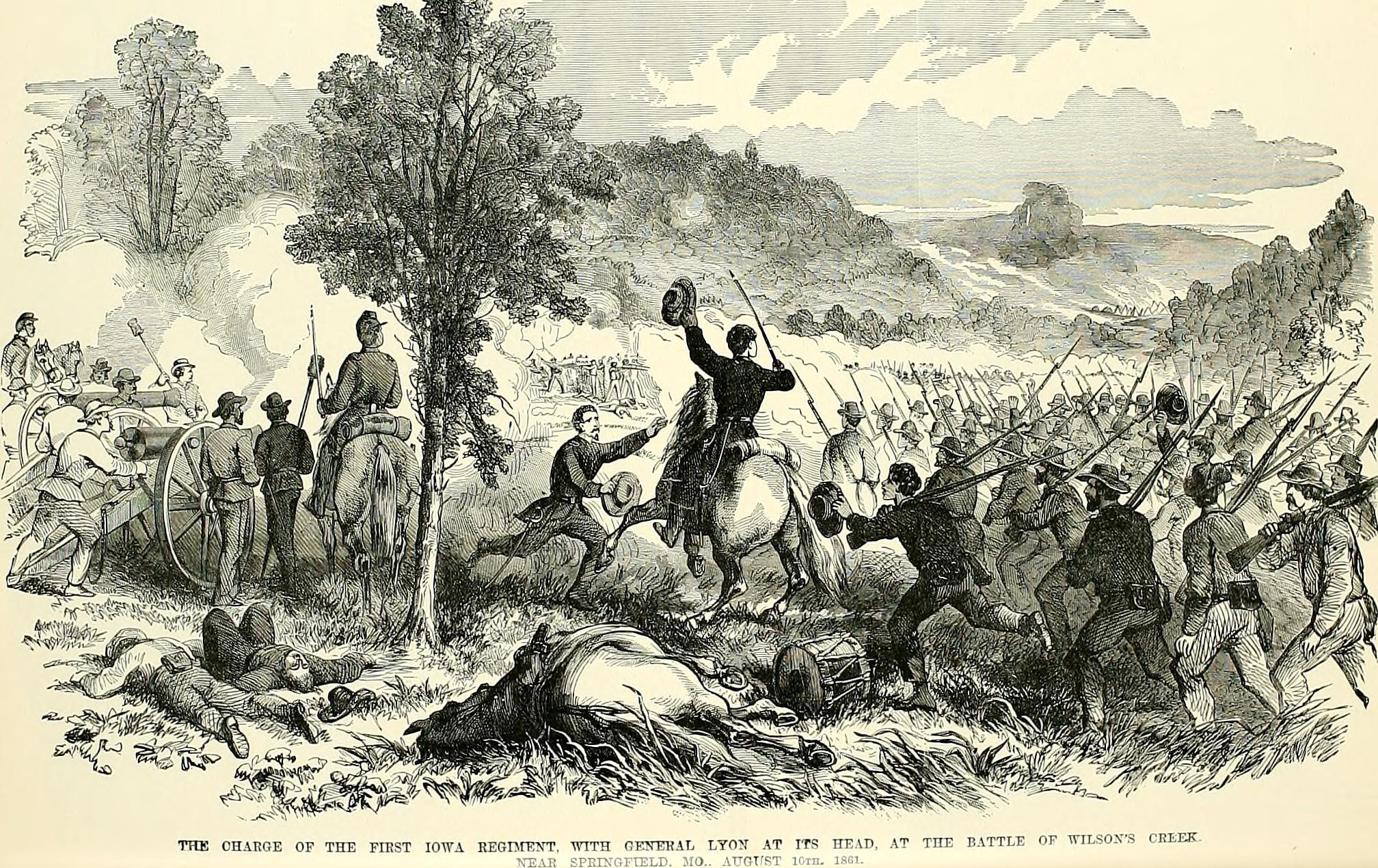
Date	August 10, 1861
Location	Wilson's Creek, near Springfield, Missouri 37.1000°N 93.4075°W
Result	Confederate victory

Belligerents
United States	Confederate States; Missouri (Confederate)

Commanders and leaders
(United States) Nathaniel Lyon † (United States) Franz Sigel (United States) Samuel D. Sturgis	Sterling Price (Confederate States of America) Ben McCulloch (Confederate States of America) Nicholas Pearce

Units involved
Army of the West	Missouri State Guard; Western Army

Strength
c. 5,431	c. 12,125

Casualties and losses
1,317 (285 killed 873 wounded 186 missing)	1,222 (277 killed 945 wounded)
- Location within Missouri

The Battle of Wilson's Creek, also known as the Battle of Oak Hills, was the first major battle of the Trans-Mississippi Theater of the American Civil War. It was fought on August 10, 1861, near Springfield, Missouri.

In August, Confederates under Brigadier General Benjamin McCulloch and Missouri State Guard troops under Maj. Gen. Sterling Price approached Brig. Gen. Nathaniel Lyon's Army of the West, camped at Springfield. On August 10, Lyon, in two columns commanded by himself and Col. Franz Sigel, attacked the Confederates on Wilson Creek (Note: The stream was actually named Wilson Creek at the time, but soldiers on both sides commonly referred to it as Wilson's Creek.) about 10 miles (16 km) southwest of Springfield. Confederate cavalry received the first blow and retreated from the high ground. Confederate infantry attacked the Union forces three times during the day, but failed to break through. Eventually, Sigel's column was driven back to Springfield, allowing the Confederates to consolidate their forces against Lyon's main column. When Lyon was killed, Major Samuel D. Sturgis assumed command of the Union forces. When Sturgis realized that his men were exhausted and lacking ammunition, he ordered a retreat to Springfield. The battle was reckoned as a Confederate victory, but the Confederates were too disorganized and ill-equipped to pursue the retreating Union forces.

Although the state remained in the Union for the remainder of the war, the battle effectively gave the Confederates control of southwestern Missouri. The victory at Wilson's Creek also allowed Price to lead the Missouri State Guard north in a campaign culminating at the siege of Lexington, Missouri.

== Background ==
=== Military and political situation ===
The battle as depicted on a mural in the Missouri State Capitol

At the beginning of the American Civil War in 1861, the state of Missouri was a politically divided border state. Permitting slavery, the state had long-standing cultural and economic ties to the Southern United States, although these had declined in the years leading up to the outbreak of war. While the state's newly-elected Governor Claiborne Fox Jackson did not openly support seceding from the United States and joining the Confederate States of America, he harbored pro-Confederate sympathies. The outgoing governor had appealed to the state to maintain "armed neutrality" during the conflict. On April 20, a secessionist mob seized the arsenal in Liberty, Missouri, increasing Union concerns in the state. Unionist activities in the state increased as well.

Under an 1858 state law governing the militia, Jackson called out the Missouri Volunteer Militia (MVM) for mustering and training. Those companies from the St. Louis area encamped at Lindell's Grove, creating a camp they named Camp Jackson. These militia numbered close to 900 men under the command of Brigadier General Daniel M. Frost and were mostly pro-secession and pro-Confederate. Jackson had secretly obtained two cannons from the Confederate government, and Jackson and Frost intended to use the militia to capture the St. Louis Arsenal. Captain Nathaniel Lyon of the United States Army was aware of these developments and was concerned the militia would move on the arsenal. In late April, Lyon had mustered five regiments of Home Guard into Union service; four of the five regiments were predominantly German. He received further authorization April 30 to raise another five regiments as a reserve under the command of Thomas W. Sweeny. These troops were given arms by the federal government but were not formally mustered into the United States Army; this was considered an extraordinary measure. Lyon kept aware of the activities of the militia camp; he is alleged to have scouted in the camp in a carriage while disguised as an old blind woman. On the morning of May 10, Lyon led his troops in converging columns against Camp Jackson. With Lyon's armed men around the camp, Frost surrendered the militia encampment to Lyon under protest. Lyon paraded his prisoners through the St. Louis streets. Crowds expressed anti-German and pro-Confederate sentiments. A drunk fired a shot at the soldiers after an altercation, and further firing followed. Some of the German troops opened fire on the crowd. Three prisoners, two soldiers, and twenty-eight civilians were killed, with roughly seventy-five more civilians wounded. This became known as the Camp Jackson affair.

News of the events at Camp Jackson led the previously pro-Union state legislature to pass legislation that veered towards secession. On May 14, what was known as the "military bill" was officially passed. This created the Missouri State Guard (MSG), a new militia organization. The MSG was organized into nine divisions. Sterling Price, a former moderate who had objected to the events at Camp Jackson, was placed in command with the rank of major general. One division was never effectively formed due to Union control of the St. Louis area, and the others varied in size from roughly 400 men to over 2,000. The divisions were based on geography, and were not organized in the traditional military sense. Seeing Missouri's tilt to the South, William S. Harney, the Federal commander of the U.S. Army's Department of the West (which included Missouri) negotiated the Price-Harney Truce on May 21, which nominally created cooperation between the U.S. Army and the MSG to maintain order in Missouri. Under the agreement, the Missouri government would keep peace in the state; so long as the situation remained peaceful, Harney would not intervene with the military. If intervention was necessary, Harney agreed to cooperate with the state forces in peace-keeping. Effectively, this required the federal government to be neutral in the conflict.

=== Initial military actions ===
After complaints by Missouri Unionists, Harney was relieved and Lyon promoted to Brigadier General, actions that undermined the fragile truce with Price. However, instead of Lyon replacing Harney as departmental commander, Missouri was transferred from the Department of the West to the Department of the Ohio. On June 11, Lyon and Francis Preston Blair Jr. met with Jackson and Price at the St. Louis Planter's House Hotel in a last attempt to avoid a resumption of fighting. Jackson offered to disband the state militia under the condition that Federal forces be restricted to the St. Louis metropolitan area, but Lyon rejected it. The historians William Garrett Piston and Richard Hatcher believe that Jackson and Price, with their forces unready for battle, were trying to buy time. In a book published in 1886, Colonel Thomas Snead, by then the only surviving witness to that meeting, stated that the meeting ended with Lyon saying:

...rather than concede to the State of Missouri for one single instant the right to dictate to my government in any matter however unimportant, I would see you, and you, and you, and you, and every man, woman, and child in the State, dead and buried. This means war.

Lyon sent a force under Sweeny to Springfield, although Sweeny remained in St. Louis for a time with the troops commanded by Franz Sigel in his absence. Another prong of the advance was commanded by Lyon personally and moved from St. Louis towards the state capital of Jefferson City, which was captured on June 15. Further troops were intended to move from Fort Leavenworth in Kansas and join Lyon in western Missouri. On June 17, Lyon routed a portion of the Missouri State Guard in the Battle of Boonville. Price, Jackson, and the Missouri State Guard withdrew south. Sigel moved to attack Jackson's militia forces in southwestern Missouri but was defeated in the Battle of Carthage on July 5. In light of the crisis, the delegates of the Missouri Constitutional Convention that had previously rejected secession in February reconvened in late July. The convention declared the offices of governor, lieutenant governor, and secretary of state vacant and selected Hamilton Rowan Gamble to be the new provisional governor.

After the defeat at Carthage, Sigel withdrew to Springfield. On July 7, Lyon and the forces with him were joined at Clinton, Missouri, by a force that had arrived from Kansas commanded by Major Samuel D. Sturgis. These troops with Lyon reached the Springfield area on July 13, although Lyon did not immediately allow his troops to enter Springfield until they had been resupplied, as a precaution against looting. Price and Jackson counted on support from Confederate Brigadier General Benjamin McCulloch. McCulloch and Arkansas militia general N. Bart Pearce entered Missouri on July 4, but withdrew back to Arkansas two days later. Price gathered his troops at Cassville on July 28, where they were joined by McCulloch's troops again on July 29, with Pearce's men following two days later. Price and McCulloch developed plans to attack Springfield and put their troops in motion. Having heard rumors that Missouri State Guard troops were moving to occupy a town northwest of Springfield, aware that he was unlikely to get reinforcements from his commanding officer John C. Frémont, and aware of the concentration at Cassville, Lyon marched his troops out of Springfield on August 1 to confront Price and McCulloch's forces. Lyon's vanguard routed James S. Rains' Missouri state guard forces on August 2 in the Battle of Dug Springs. Short on supplies, Lyon withdrew to Springfield on August 4 after a council of war. On August 3 and 4, Price urged McCulloch to attack, but McCulloch was hesitant due to doubts about the quality of the Missouri State Guard which had grown stronger after the fight at Dug Springs. After receiving communications regarding Confederate operations in southeastern Missouri, McCulloch decided to order an advance. On August 6, his force was encamped at Wilson Creek, 10 miles (16 km) southwest of the city. Price was informed by civilians on August 8 that Lyon was considering a withdrawal from Springfield, leading Price to advocate for an assault. McCulloch was initially unwilling to attack, but after a council of war the next day in which Price threatened to attack without McCulloch, agreed to an attack on the morning of April 10. This attack was called off due to a rainstorm late on April 9, which would have dampened the soldiers' gunpowder, preventing them from firing.

Outnumbered, with many of his men's enlistments expiring or about to expire, and aware that he would not be receiving assistance from St. Louis, Lyon's only logical option was to withdraw to Rolla, Missouri. However, the naturally aggressive Lyon did not want to withdraw without a fight; it was hoped that such a fight would delay or discourage pursuit. The decision to attack was made on August 8, with the offensive movement to begin late the next day. At a council of war on the afternoon of August 9, Sigel proposed striking McCulloch in a pincer movement, which would split the already outnumbered Union force; he planned to lead 1,200 men in a flanking maneuver while the main body under Lyon struck from the north. Lyon had previously rejected an earlier plan from Sigel involving an attack by divided forces. While other officers opposed the decision, Lyon concurred with Sigel's plan, which was adopted. The Union army marched out to battle late on August 9; it was rainy for part of the march. Part of Lyon's command was left in Springfield, tasked with guarding the city and preparing for an evacuation in case of defeat.

== Opposing forces ==
Key Union commanders
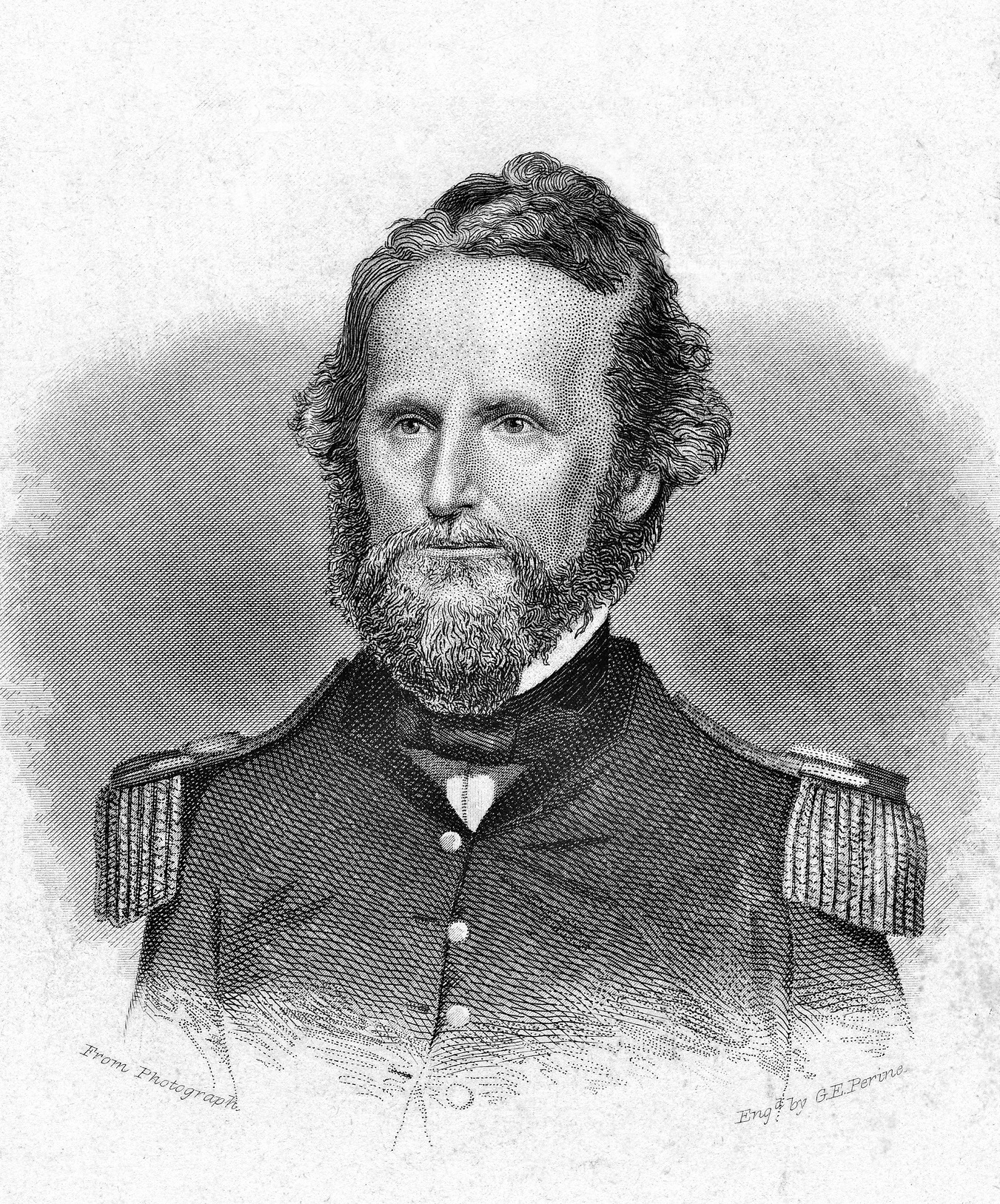
Brig. Gen.
Nathaniel Lyon, USA

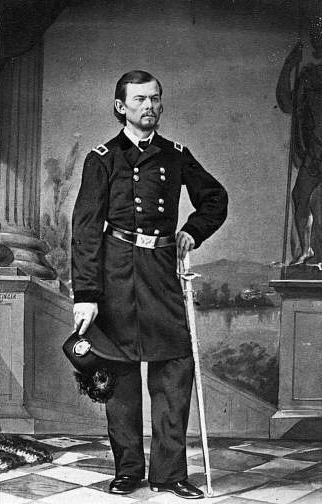
Col. Franz Sigel, USA

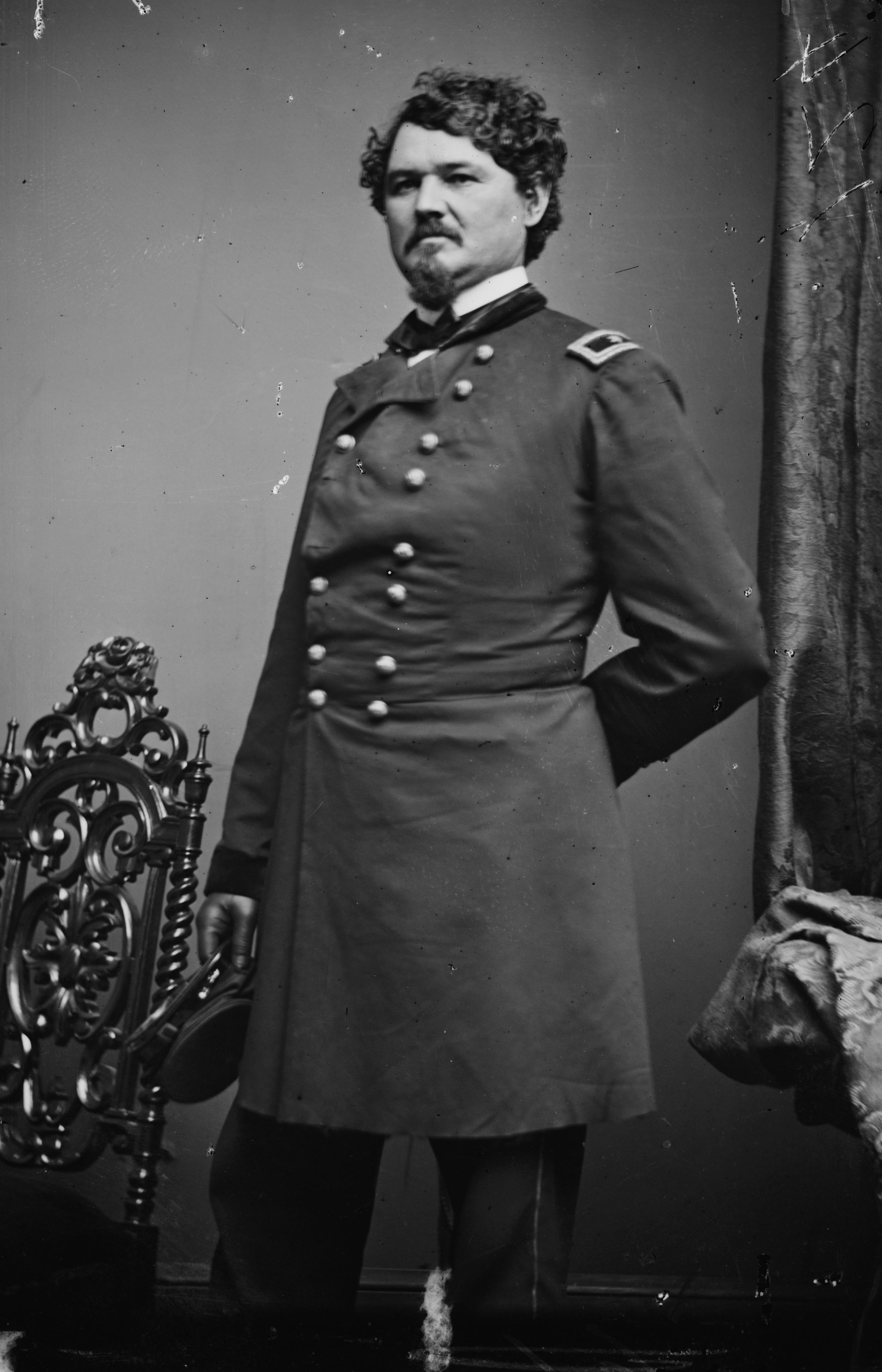
Maj. Samuel D. Sturgis, USA

Key Confederate commanders
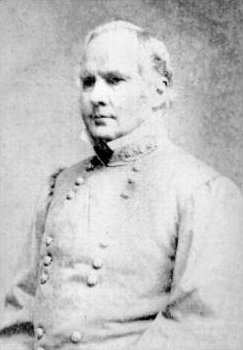
Maj. Gen.
Sterling Price, MSG

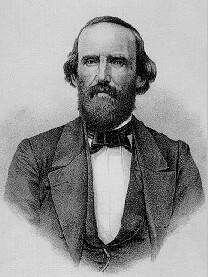
Brig. Gen.
Ben McCulloch, CSA

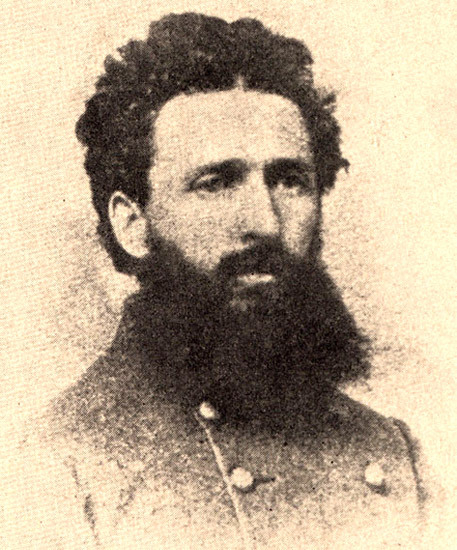
Brig. Gen.
Nicholas Bartlett Pearce, CSA

=== Union ===
Lyon's army was known as the Army of the West. This army was formed from three bodies of troops: one that had accompanied Lyon south from Boonville; troops that had moved from Fort Leavenworth, Kansas, under the command of Sturgis; and a force that had moved down from St. Louis commanded by Sweeny. Sweeny's troops had left St. Louis before he did, and these soldiers were commanded by Sigel earlier in the campaign. In late July, Lyon organized his command into four brigades, commanded by Sturgis, Sigel, George L. Andrews, and George W. Dietzler. Many of Lyon's soldiers earlier in the campaign had enlistment terms of only ninety days, and in July roughly 2,000 soldiers left Lyon's army to be discharged in St. Louis. At the battle, Lyon's force numbered 5,431 men. Further troops remained behind in Springfield, including a 1,200-man Home Guard unit.

=== Confederate ===
McCulloch's army lacked a formal name, although he referred to it as the Western Army. Pearce referred to it as the Army of Arkansas or the Consolidated Army. Price did not consider the Missouri State Guard to be party of the Confederacy, and in June Jackson had delivered a speech arguing that the Missourians were bound to the United States Constitution, but that loyalty to Missouri bore precedence and that the United States government itself was behaving in an unconstitutional manner. While Pearce's troops were clearly subordinate to McCulloch, the same could not be said about Price's MSG. Price eventually offered overall command to McCulloch, who accepted the responsibility. Many of the soldiers were armed only with civilian weapons, and roughly 2,000 unarmed MSG soldiers accompanied the march. The presence of both these unarmed men and a number of Missouri camp followers breached an earlier agreement reached between Price and McCulloch. Including the unarmed Missouri militia, the Western Army numbered an estimated 12,125 men at Wilson's Creek. McCulloch viewed the MSG as undisciplined and unreliable.

== Battle ==
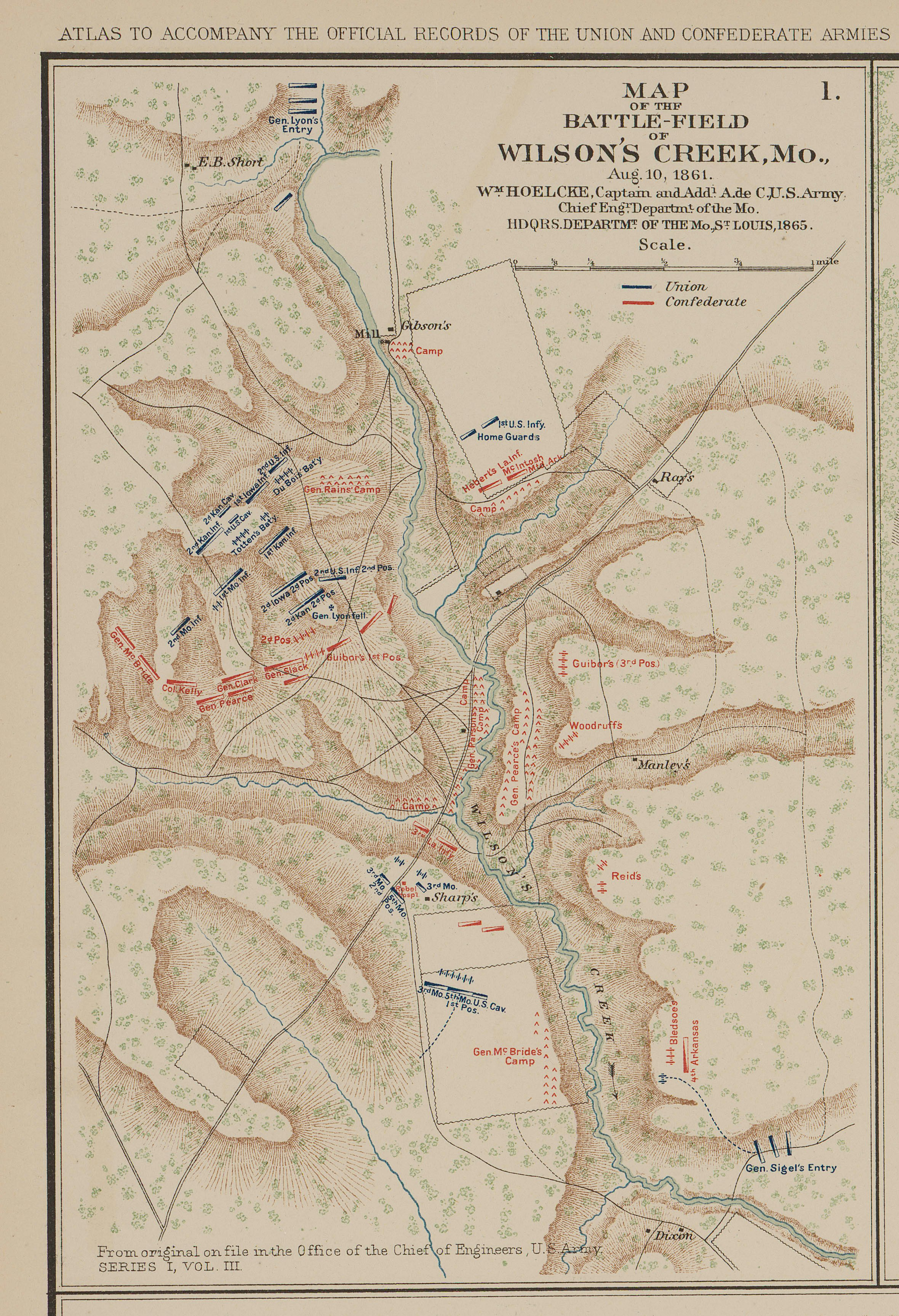
Battle of Wilson's Creek (August 10, 1861)

McCulloch's camp had withdrawn its pickets during the night, which allowed Lyon's column to surprise the opposing force. The first notice the Confederates and allied militia received was when a group of foragers from Rains' division sighted the Union approach early on the morning of August 10. Colonel James Cawthorn, who commanded Rains' cavalry, later sent out a patrol, which made contact with Lyon's force. The first shots of the battle were fired at around 5:00 am by some of Lyon's artillery. Cawthorn brought up more of his men and formed a line on a ridge which became known as "Bloody Hill". McCulloch received word of the Union advance from Rains, but did not believe it, considering the news to be "another of Rains's scares". An acoustic shadow had prevent the sounds of the initial firing reaching McCulloch. McCulloch, Price, and James M. McIntosh soon received visual evidence of the Union advance. Lyon sent Joseph B. Plummer with a force of United States Regulars and some cavalry across the creek to its east side, to extend the Union attack to the left. Cawthorn's MSG cavalry was driven from the crest of Bloody Hill by the Union advance at about 5:30 am.

An Arkansas unit, the Pulaski Light Battery, commanded by Captain William Woodruff, opened fire on the Union troops on Bloody Hill. James Totten responded with fire from his Union battery; Totten had provided artillery training to Woodruff in peacetime. In addition to shooting at Woodruff's battery, Totten also fired on the Confederate and militia camps. Lyon spent until 6:30 am strengthening and organizing his position on Bloody Hill, while Price gathered his Missouri State Guardsmen to confront Lyon. Pearce was informed at around 5:00 am by two men who had left camp that Union forces were moving past Pearce's camp to the east; they had likely encountered the rear elements of Sigel's column, which was in position south of the camp by then. Meanwhile, Plummer continued his movement, but was slowed by difficult terrain. Hoping to defeat Woodruff's battery, Plummer moved his Regulars into the Ray cornfield. McCulloch responded by sending McIntosh with the 2nd Arkansas Mounted Rifles, the 3rd Louisiana Infantry Regiment, and an Arkansas militia unit to confront them. McIntosh attacked and drove Plummer's men from the cornfield, but was in turn repulsed by Union artillery fire from Bloody Hill. Plummer withdrew back to the main Union position.

Sigel reported that he first heard the sound of Lyon's battle at about 5:30 am. He had already positioned some of his artillery on a knoll overlooking the Joseph Sharp farm, and after hearing the sounds of Lyon's engagement, ordered the guns to fire. Located below in Sharp's fields were around 1,500 cavalry troops, including men from both the Confederate, Missouri State Guard, and Arkansas state forces, as well as nearly 2,000 unarmed Missouri State Guardsmen and camp followers. The artillery fire threw the forces there into chaos, and many of the routed cavalrymen were not easily rallied. Sigel's main column continued on, fording Wilson Creek and crossing Terrell Creek. The artillery on the knoll was later ordered to rejoin Sigel's main body. After resting in an exposed column formation from 6:30 to 7:00 am. Soon afterwards, Sigel's artillery again deployed to disperse an opposing force. A leading cavalry force commanded by Eugene Carr reached the Sharp house around 8:00 am, where it positioned itself on the Wire Road, which was the line of communications for the Southern forces.

From Bloody Hill, two of Lyon's officers, Sturgis and John Schofield, heard the sounds of Sigel's opening artillery barrage, although they erroneously believed that they could hear enemy return fire. Additional artillery fire from Sigel's direction was heard shortly after 7:00 am. Lyon began a movement forward afterwards. Price and his poorly armed men, whose weapons were suitable only for close-range combat, awaited the attack. The Union advance did not consist of Lyon's full available force; for reasons that are not entirely known Lyon's advance was made only by the 1st Missouri Infantry Regiment and part of the 1st Kansas Infantry Regiment, about 1,200 men. Lyon soon added the rest of the 1st Kansas to the fray. Price formed a line to oppose Lyon's advance, with the Missouri State Guard divisions of William Y. Slack, John Bullock Clark, Mosby M. Parsons, and James H. McBride generally aligned from right to left, although some units fought out of place in the confusion. The fighting continued for about half an hour before tapering off.

Lyon aligned his position on Bloody Hill on Totten's battery. This position was flawed, as the infantry positioned on top of the hill could not see its base. McBride's troops moved to a position that threatened the right flank of the 1st Missouri. McBride's division was a poorly led and disciplined force largely drawn from Ozarks mountain folk; McBride was a judge and his staff was largely country lawyers. The movement's result in flanking the 1st Missouri was accidental. While it shifted the offensive to the Southern forces, it left McBride in an isolated and dangerous position. Lyon's position on Bloody Hill was reinforced by the arrival of Lieutenant John V. Du Bois's battery. Once the Union attack had ceased, Lyon's troops were aligned on Bloody Hill from left to right as follows: the 1st Iowa Infantry Regiment, Du Bois's battery, the 1st Kansas, a portion of Totten's battery, and then the 1st Missouri, with the 2nd Kansas Infantry Regiment in reserve. Price's troops made uncoordinated assault; it is not clear if this had been actually ordered or if it was a reaction to McBride's movement against the 1st Missouri. Roughly 1,000 men from Colonel Richard Weightman's infantry brigade of Rains's division entered the fray, leading Lyon to deploy the 2nd Kansas to the front line. The addition of the 2nd Kansas and a counterattack by part of the 1st Kansas led to Price's attack breaking off at about 8:00 am. A lull began at the Bloody Hill sector of the battlefield.

Sigel's men were poorly deployed. Backof's Missouri Light Artillery Battery faced north, firing towards the lower portions of Bloody Hill. It was supported by part of the 3rd Missouri Infantry Regiment, which was inexperienced. To the right front of the battery, the ground fell off towards Skegg's Branch; the Union battery could not fire into the low ground. Carr's cavalry was in a wooded area where it could neither see nor support Backof's battery, a company from the 2nd U.S. Dragoons was to the right and rear and also in a position where it could not readily support the battery, and the rest of the 3rd Missouri and the 5th Missouri Infantry Regiment were held in reserve. McCulloch observed Sigel's position and was aware that it was badly positioned. McCulloch brought up part of the 3rd Louisiana, which was no longer engaged after the defeat of Plummer, and sent it towards Sigel's position. He left Pearce's Arkansas state troops in their position on high ground, possibly out of concern that another Union column might appear suddenly as Sigel's had. To his right, Lieutenant Colonel Thomas H. Rosser had gathered two infantry regiments and Hiram Bledsoe's Missouri Battery from Rains's division, although McCulloch did not coordinate his movements with this force. At this time it was around 8:30 am.

The uniform color scheme of blue for Union troops and gray for the Confederates had not been standardized at this point in the war, and when the 3rd Louisiana became visible from Sigel's position, it was thought that the Louisiana unit was the gray-clad 1st Iowa. The Union officers issued orders to avoid opening friendly fire on the advancing unit. Sigel sent a private down the Wire Road to ascertain the identity of any approaching forces, but he was shot by one of the Louisianans after realizing that the advancing unit was Confederate. Two officers from the 3rd Louisiana advanced up the slope, and found that instead of striking Sigel's position on the flank, the 3rd Louisiana would hit the Union battery head-on. As the two men retreated down the slope, Bledsoe's battery and the Reid's Fort Smith Battery (one of Pearce's units) opened fire, shortly followed by Sigel's guns. Adding to the Union confusion, the fact that Reid's battery was firing grapeshot led some of Sigel's men to believe they were being fired on by Totten's battery, as it was thought that the Confederates did not have grapeshot. The 3rd Louisiana charged, joined by a force of Missouri State Guard troops. Rosser's troops struck the Union left, and a battalion of Pearce's troops commanded by Lieutenant Colonel Dandridge McRae also joined the fight. Four of the Union guns were overrun, and Sigel's brigade was routed, with the men fleeing to Springfield in multiple groups. The dragoons were able to bring one of Backof's remaining guns back to Springfield, but another was captured during the chaotic retreat. Piston and Hatcher believe that Sigel was probably the first Union soldier other than evacuated wounded to reach Springfield from the battlefield.

Shortly before 9:00 am, the lull that had formed in the Bloody Hill sector ended with another southern assault. Lyon's force numbered about 3,500 men and ten cannons at this point, with his only reserve being a portion of Plummer's unit of United States Regulars. This second assault against the Union lines lasted until around 10:00 am. The defeat of Sigel having eased pressure on that portion of the Southern line, McCulloch was able to bring up troops to support Price for the attack. The position of the 1st Kansas was pressed hard by Weightman's brigade. Lyon's horse had been killed, and the general had been wounded in the head and right leg. He led a counterattack by the 2nd Kansas and was killed, becoming the war's first battle death for a Union general. Command of the Union forces on Bloody Hill fell to Sturgis. This fighting also resulted in Weightman receiving a mortal wound. As the primary Southern assault failed, a disjointed cavalry assault was against the Union flank made by Colonel Elkanah Greer with his South Kansas-Texas Cavalry and Colonel DeRosey Carroll and his 1st Arkansas Cavalry unsuccessfully.

The third Southern assault against Bloody Hill was the largest, and included more of Pearce's troops than the preceding ones. It began at around 10:30 am and was made by about 3,000 men. This assault, which lasted about 45 minutes, also failed, with the Union artillery having played a major role in the repulse. With ammunition running low in at least the 2nd Kansas and no information from Sigel, Sturgis decided to withdraw at around 11:30, during the lull after the failed third assault. The Union troops retreating from Bloody Hill encountered some of Sigel's retreating men during the retreat and learned of the fate of that portion of the Union column. Sturgis's men returned to Springfield at about 5:00 pm.

== Aftermath ==
The casualties were about equal on both sides – around 1,317 Union and an estimated 1,222 Confederate/Missourian/Arkansan soldiers were either killed, wounded, or captured. Nearly a quarter of Lyon's force had become casualties. Union percentage losses were heaviest in the 1st Missouri, 2nd Missouri, and 1st Kansas. The 1st Kansas's killed and mortally wounded was the seventh-highest for any Union regiment during the entire war. For the Southerners, McCulloch's Confederate troops and Price's Missouri State Guard suffered much heavier losses than Pearce's Arkansas state troops. After falling back to Springfield, Sturgis handed command of the Union army over to Sigel. At a council of war that evening, it was agreed that the army had to fall back to Rolla, beginning early the next morning. However, Sigel failed to get his brigade ready at that time, forcing a delay of several hours. Sigel drove the troops hard during the heat of the day on August 11, but several days later allowed his men to make a lengthy delay to prepare food. Additionally, his troops were given the preferred spot in the line of march every day, and there were concerns about inequitable distribution of rations. At the urging of the other officers, Sturgis took command back from Sigel during the retreat. The Union forces reached Rolla on August 19.

After the battle ended, Price and McCulloch agreed that a pursuit was impracticable due to the exhaustion of their army and an ammunition shortage. The relationship between the two generals also deteriorated. McCulloch objected to wording in Price's after-battle report, which barely mentioned McCulloch's personal participation in the battle and implied that Price's Missourians had taken the cannons captured by the 3rd Louisiana. On August 14, Price took back personal command of the Missouri State Guard. Pearce's troops returned to Arkansas and passed out of McCulloch's control. McCulloch also returned with this force to Arkansas. Price's Missouri State Guard began an invasion of northern Missouri up to the Missouri River that culminated in the First Battle of Lexington, which ended on September 20.

Frémont was able to concentrate a force that was much larger than Price's, and the Missouri State Guard soon withdrew from Lexington. Union troops retook Springfield in late October. In late October, a rump session of the Missouri General Assembly met without a proper quorum at Neosho, Missouri and passed an ordinance of secession, which was approved by Jackson. Jackson's government of Missouri was admitted into the Confederacy as a Confederate state in November. The Unionist provision government retained control of the state for the rest of the war.

By early 1862, Price withdrew from southwestern Missouri in the face of an advance led by Union Major General Samuel Ryan Curtis. Confederate Major General Earl Van Dorn took command of Price's and McCulloch's combined forces, but was defeated by Curtis at the Battle of Pea Ridge in Arkansas, in a multi-day battle that concluded on March 8. Jackson died in December 1862. After Curtis's victory, the state remained firmly in Union hands, but was wracked by devastating guerrilla warfare afterwards. In 1864, Price led an expedition to reclaim Missouri for the Confederacy, but this ended in a disastrous Confederate defeat. This was the last major campaign in the war west of the Mississippi River. The war ended in 1865 with a Confederate defeat. In the 1890s, five Union soldiers who had fought in the battle were awarded the Medal of Honor for their actions at Wilson's Creek: Lorenzo Immell, John Schofield, Henry Clay Wood, William M. Wherry, and Nicholas Bouquet.

The Battle of Wilson's Creek was the first major battle fought in the Trans-Mississippi theater of the war. The battle was known as the Battle of Oak Hills in the Confederacy, and is sometimes called the "Bull Run of the West".

== Battlefield preservation ==
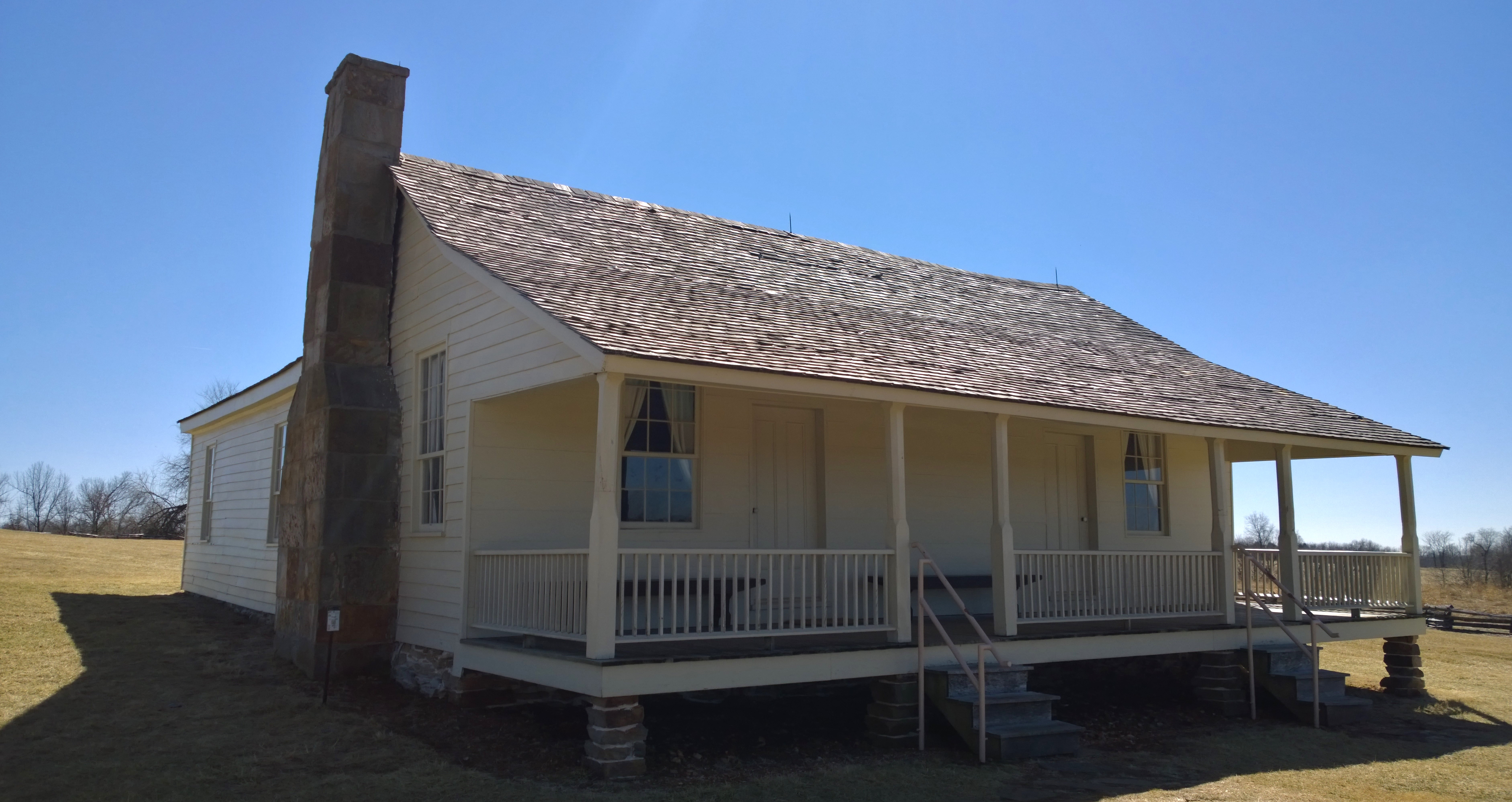
The Ray House at the eastern end of Wilson's Creek National Battlefield

The site of the battle has been protected as Wilson's Creek National Battlefield. The National Park Service operates a visitor center featuring exhibits, a fiber optic map displaying the course of the battle, and a research library. Living history programs depicting various aspects of the soldier's experience of that area are presented on weekends seasonally. The battlefield encompasses 1,750 acres (7.1 km^{2}). The National Park Service has restored a large amount of this to vegetation patterns similar to those present during the battle. The home of the Ray family, which served as a Confederate field hospital during the battle, has been preserved and represents one of only two structures in existence during the battle to still be extant on the park today (the other being a springhouse). In addition, the American Battlefield Trust has preserved 278 acres (1.13 km^{2}) of the Wilson's Creek battlefield.

== See also ==
- List of costliest American Civil War land battles
- Troop engagements of the American Civil War, 1861
- Frémont Emancipation
- Missouri in the American Civil War

== Sources ==
- Bearss, Ed (1975). The Battle of Wilson's Creek. George Washington Carver Birthplace District Association. OCLC 1327752289.
- Brooksher, William Riley (2000) [1995]. Bloody Hill: The Civil War Battle of Wilson's Creek. Lincoln, Nebraska: Potomac Books. ISBN 978-1-57488-205-6.
- Burchett, Kenneth E. (2013). The Battle of Carthage, Missouri: First Trans-Mississippi Conflict of the Civil War. Jefferson, North Carolina: McFarland & Company. ISBN 978-0-7864-6959-8.
- Castel, Albert E. (1993) [1968]. General Sterling Price and the Civil War in the West. Baton Rouge, Louisiana: Louisiana State University Press. ISBN 0-8071-1854-0.
- Gerteis, Louis S. (2015) [2012]. The Civil War in Missouri: A Military History (First Paperback ed.). Columbia, Missouri: University of Missouri Press. ISBN 978-0-8262-2078-3.
- Hatcher, Richard (1998). "Wilson's Creek, Missouri". In Kennedy, Frances H. (ed.). The Civil War Battlefield Guide (2nd ed.). Boston/New York: Houghton Mifflin. ISBN 978-0-395-74012-5.
- Kennedy, Frances H., ed. (1998). The Civil War Battlefield Guide (2nd ed.). Boston/New York: Houghton Mifflin. ISBN 978-0-395-74012-5.
- Parrish, William E. (2001) [1973]. A History of Missouri. Vol. III: 1860 to 1875. Columbia, Missouri: University of Missouri Press. ISBN 0-8262-1376-6.
- Phillips, Christopher (1996) [1990]. Damned Yankee: The Life of General Nathaniel Lyon (Louisiana Paperback ed.). Baton Rouge, Louisiana: Louisiana State University Press. ISBN 0-8071-2103-7.
- Phillips, Christopher (2000). Missouri's Confederate: Claiborne Fox Jackson and the Creation of Southern Identity in the Border West. Columbia, Missouri: University of Missouri Press. ISBN 0-8262-1272-7.
- Piston, William Garrett; Hatcher, Richard (2000). Wilson's Creek: The Second Battle of the Civil War and the Men Who Fought It. University of North Carolina Press. ISBN 9780807825150. OCLC 41185008.
- Shea, William L.; Hess, Earl J. (1998). "Pea Ridge, Arkansas". In Kennedy, Frances H. (ed.). The Civil War Battlefield Guide (2nd ed.). Boston/New York: Houghton Mifflin. pp. 34–37. ISBN 978-0-395-74012-5.
- Welcher, Frank J. (1993). The Union Army 1861–1865: Organization and Operations. Vol. II: The Western Theater. Bloomington, Indiana: Indiana University Press. ISBN 0-253-36454-X.
