= Arkansas Militia in the Civil War =

The units of the Arkansas Militia in the Civil War to which the current Arkansas National Guard has a connection include the Arkansas State Militia, Home Guard, and State Troop regiments raised by the State of Arkansas. Like most of the United States, Arkansas had an organized militia system before the American Civil War. State law required military service of most male inhabitants of a certain age. Following the War with Mexico, the Arkansas militia experienced a decline, but as sectional frictions between the north and south began to build in the late 1850s the militia experienced a revival. By 1860 the state's militia consisted of 62 regiments divided into eight brigades, which comprised an eastern division and a western division. New regiments were added as the militia organization developed. Additionally, many counties and cities raised uniformed volunteer companies, which drilled more often and were better equipped than the un-uniformed militia. These volunteer companies were instrumental in the seizure of federal installations at Little Rock and Fort Smith, beginning in February 1861.

Once Arkansas left the Union in May 1861, the existing volunteer militia companies were among the first mustered into state service and be formed into new volunteer infantry regiments, also referred to as "State Troops". These new regiments comprised the Provisional Army of Arkansas. In July 1861 and agreement was reached to transfer the existing state forces into the Confederate army. The Second Division of the Army of Arkansas was transferred to the Confederate Army under the command of General William E. Hardee, but before the First Division of the Army of Arkansas could be transferred, it participated in the Battle of Wilson's Creek near Springfield, Missouri, in August 1861. Following the battle of Wilson's Creek, the First Division voted to disband rather than enter Confederate Service.

In November 1861, Colonel Solon S. Borland, commanding Confederate forces at Pittman's Ferry received information regarding an imminent invasion of Northeast Arkansas and issued an immediate call for Militia forces to re-enforce his position. The State Military Board authorized the activation of Eighth Brigade of Militia, and one company from the militia regiments of Prairie, Monroe, Poinsett, Saint Francis, and Craighead counties. The units that responded to this call were formed into three regiments of 30 Day Volunteers. Some of these companies later enrolled in regular Confederate service.

In the spring of 1862 a Union invasion of Northwest Arkansas necessitated an activation of parts of the state militia. In February 1862, General McCulloch issued a proclamation from Fayetteville requesting that "every man turn out and form companies, and rally to meet the advancing enemy". Brigadier General N. B. Burrow, commander of the 3rd Brigade, 1st Division, Arkansas State Militia reacted by activating his entire brigade consisting of six regiments for approximately three weeks. Later in the Summer of 1862, when Major General Hindman assumed command of the Department of the Trans-Mississippi, the militia regiments were required to provide volunteers for new Confederate regiments or face conscription.

After the fall of Little Rock to Union forces in September 1863, Governor Harris Flanagin ordered out the militia regiments of Clark, Hempstead, Sevier, Pike, Polk, Montgomery, La Fayette, Ouachita, Union, and Columbia counties and directed them to supply mounted companies for new regiments of State Troops. This recruiting method succeeded in supplying several new mounted companies which participated in resisting Union General Steele's Camden Expedition in the spring of 1864. Sporadic recruiting of new volunteer companies from the Militia continued until March 1865.

The Arkansas Secession Convention directed each county to organize a Home Guard organization, which was intended to include old men and boys who were otherwise disqualified from active service. The Home Guard were later commissioned to begin guerrilla operations against occupying Union forces. Once Union forces secured the state capitol in 1863, the new loyal state government immediately began raising new loyal militia forces in an attempt to combat bands of guerrillas and bushwhackers operating behind Union lines.

== The Marion County War ==
Two famous Arkansas veterans of the War with Mexico would find themselves deeply involved in the first use of the Arkansas Militia following the War with Mexico. Allen Wood, who had raised a volunteer company in Arkansas which became part of the 12th United States Infantry Regiment during the war with Mexico, was appointed as Adjutant General in 1849. On September 16, 1848, Governor John Sheldon Roane, himself a former Lieutenant Colonel in the Arkansas Regiment of Mounted Volunteers during the war with Mexico, ordered General Wood to investigate a state of unrest that existed in Marion County in 1849. Two warring families and their supporters vied for control of all county offices in what was known as the Tutt–Everett War. The Tutts, of the Whig Party and the Everetts, of the Democratic Party had a long running feud which erupted into bloodshed in June 1849. It was said that virtually every man in the county had taken sides in the affair. General Wood raised two militia companies in Carroll County, one commanded by Captain William C. Mitchell, the other by Captain Tilford Denton to assist with the capture of members of the Everetts clan and to guard the jail. General Wood relieved Sheriff Jesse Mooney, who was thought to be a member of the Everett faction and took over the county jail in Yellville. The force was eventually reduced to one company of 75 men who remained in the county from September 1849 through December 1849. Almost as soon as General Wood dismissed his militia companies, members of the Everett clan broke the prisoners out of jail. General Wood resigned the office of Adjutant General in a letter to the Governor dated July 28, 1851. On December 21, 1850, the Arkansas Legislature finally passed an act to pay for the militia called into service by General Wool. It is likely that the experience of calling out the militia for the Marion County War lead to the passage in 1852 of a law styled "an Act to provide for the organization of the Militia when called to suppress insurrections. This law allowed the county sheriff to order elections for offices of companies activated for this purpose.

== Antebellum militia on the eve of conflict ==
With the conclusion of the Mexican–American War, the Arkansas militia fell into a state of disorganization. Without a threat from Mexico or the Indians, it seemed Arkansans needed protection from no one. Election of militia officers in most counties had basically stopped by 1849. Throughout much of the 1850s the Arkansas militia was practically dead; company and regimental musters were held infrequently, and officers stopped performing their duties. Governor Elias Conway, in an address to the state legislature dated November 7, 1854, stated that the state militia had not filed a single annual status report with the War Department since 1843. Without these reports, the militia did not receive its quota of Federal arms and equipment. One Little Rock newspaper editor wrote in 1852:

There is not a volunteer military company in Little Rock; in fact, the editor cannot recall having seen a single muster in this town since the beginning of the war with Mexico [in 1846]. What has become of the military spirit of our young men? If it is not entirely extinct, we would like to see a little of it exhibited in the organization of a uniformed company here.

Elias N. Conway, elected governor in 1854, came from a prominent family of Arkansas politicians, some of whom had served in the militia during its earlier and more active years. The condition of the Arkansas Militia when Governor Conway began his revival may best be summarized by a letter to the Governor from Col. Henry Rieff, Commander of the 20th Regiment Arkansas Militia dated January 3, 1860:

... the militia of this regiment (20th) have not done any duty for several years and I do not now know who are officers and who are not, as fully as I could desire. Some have died, others no doubt removed from the county, but I am now endeavoring to investigate this matter and ascertain who are officers and order election to fill vacancies. In your letter you mention Bracken Lewis as Major but H.E. Moulden was Major but is now dead. He was Major in the 20th instead of the 32nd as stated in your letter. Lt.Col. M.S. Gregg is still living. In the 1st Battalion Maj. Moulden as before stated deceased. As you kindly offered to give me a list of the officers of Regt. 20, I will be glad to have it as it will aid me in ascertaining the officers names.

In answer to your letter relative to the 32nd Regt., I will say that Col. Denton is deceased. Also I think Lt.Col. Coulter has removed from the county and that Maj. Colwell who was elected in said regiment is deceased. Consequently the offices are all vacant. I will see General Neal as suggested who no doubt will order elections to fill the offices ...

I shall proceed at once to have this regiment (20th) officered and enrolled and I think the times and signs of the times favor it, ...

Governor Conway pushed the legislature to revise the militia laws and successfully sparked a renewed interest in the militia. He commissioned a printing of a digest of the militia laws of Arkansas in 1860. A review of the election returns for militia officers in each county in 1860 and the spring of 1861 provide some indication of the success of Governor Conway's attempt to revitalize the organization of the state militia. The militia was organized into two divisions of four brigades each. Each county supplied at least one regiment, and companies were normally organized in each township. Several counties had more than one regiment and one, Lawrence County, had three militia regiments. Regimental and company officers were elected at the annual muster. The election results were forwarded to the Governor either by the regimental commander or by the county clerk. The exact strength of these units is unclear. In May 1860, Col. George M. Holt, commander of the 18th Regiment from Saline County, claimed to have 1,000 to 1,200 men available and requested that the county be granted permission to form a second regiment.

Regiment	Brigade	Commander	Date of Election or Commission	County
1st Militia Division		Major General T.D. Merrick		
1st Militia Brigade	1st Division	Brigadier General Benjamin P. Jett, Sr.		Sevier, Hempstead, Lafayette, Pike, Clark, Ouachita, Hot Springs, Montgomery, Polk, Columbia
2nd Militia Brigade	1st Division	Brigadier General George M. Holt		Pope, Yell, Conway, Perry, White, Prairie, Pulaski, Saline
3rd Militia Brigade	1st Division	Brigadier General Napoleon B. Borrow		Crawford, Franklin, Scott, Johnson, Sebastian
4th Militia Brigade	1st Division	Brigadier General William T. Neal		Washington, Madison, Benton, Carroll
2nd Militia Division		Major General James Yell		
5th Militia Brigade	2nd Division	Brigadier General W. H. Robands		Mississippi, Crittenden, Poinsett, St. Francis, Phillips, Moore, Craighead
6th Militia Brigade	2nd Division	Brigadier General Thomas S. James		Arkansas, Union, Chicot, Desha, Jefferson, Ashley, Calhoun, Dallas, Drew, Bradely
7th Militia Brigade	2nd Division	Brigadier General E. W. Turner		Van Buren, Izard, Fulton, Marion, Searcy, Newton
8th Militia Brigade	2nd Division	Brigadier General Theodore H. Phillips		Randolph, Green, Lawrence, Independence, Jackson
1st Militia Regiment	6th Brigade	Col. Alexander H. Reynolds	February 9, 1861	Arkansas
2nd Militia Regiment	4th Brigade	Col. John T. Humphreys	February 21, 1861	Benton
3rd Militia Regiment	4th Brigade	Col. Henry Helton	April 9, 1860	Carroll
4th Militia Regiment	2nd Brigade	Col. William Turner	February 29, 1860	Conway
5th Militia Regiment	3rd Brigade	Col. John T. Humphreys	January 12, 1861	Crawford
6th Militia Regiment	6th Brigade	Col. William. W. Johnson	February 27, 1860	Desha County
7th Militia Regiment	3rd Brigade	Col. Albert L. Berry	April 20, 1860	Franklin
8th Militia Regiment	1st Brigade	Col. Daniel Griffin	February 8, 1860	Hempstead
9th Militia Regiment	8th Brigade	Col. W. A. Bivens	November 21, 1860	Independence
10th Militia Regiment	3rd Brigade	Col. John W. May	February 27, 1860	Johnson
11th Militia Regiment	4th Brigade	Col. Benjamin Vaughan	June 7, 1861	Madison
12th Militia Regiment	5th Brigade	Col. William H. Robards	April 9, 1860	Phillips
13th Militia Regiment	2nd Brigade	Col. Craven Peyton	February 11, 1860	Pulaski
14th Militia Regiment	5th Brigade	Col. Robert H. Baird	February 16, 1860	Poinsett
15th Militia Regiment	2nd Brigade	Col. John L. Williamson	July 23, 1860	Pope
16th Militia Regiment	8th Brigade	Col. James T. Martin	February 13, 1860	Randolph
17th Militia Regiment	3rd Brigade	Col. James F. Lee	February 11, 1860	Scott
18th Militia Regiment	2nd Brigade	Col. George M. Holt	February 11, 1860	Saline
19th Militia Regiment	5th Brigade	Col. Marsh Walker	February 18, 1860	St Francis
20th Militia Regiment	4th Brigade	Col. Henry Rieff	January 7, 1860	Washington
21st Militia Regiment	2nd Brigade	Col. John Critz	February 8, 1860	White
22nd Militia Regiment	7th Brigade	Col. J. B. Simms	June 24, 1861	Van Buren
23rd Militia Regiment	6th Brigade	Col. Batt Jones	April 9, 1860	Chicot
24th Militia Regiment	6th Brigade	Col. Donelson McGregor	February 22, 1860	Jefferson
25th Militia Regiment	8th Brigade	Col. James H. McCalob	April 21, 1860	Lawrence
26th Militia Regiment	2nd Brigade	Col. William H. Dawson	February 27, 1860	Yell
27th Militia Regiment	6th Brigade	Col. I. E. Crane	June 20, 1841	Bradley
28th Militia Regiment	1st Brigade	Col. William M. Bruce	March 12, 1860	Clark
29th Militia Regiment	6th Brigade	Col. William R. Cowser	May 10, 1860	Union
30th Militia Regiment	5th Brigade	Col. Reuben T. Redman	May 17, 1860	Crittenden
31st Militia Regiment	7th Brigade	Col. J. R. Dowd	February 28, 1860	Marion
32nd Militia Regiment	4th Brigade	Col. George W. Hughes	July 16, 1860	Washington
33rd Militia Regiment	8th Brigade	Col. R. C. Mock	April 10, 1860	Green
34th Militia Regiment	8th Brigade	Col. Christopher W. Board	February 8, 1860	Jackson
35th Militia Regiment	5th Brigade	Col. Caleb W. Richardson	March 8, 1860	Monroe County
36th Militia Regiment	2nd Brigade	Col. John Baskins	March 1, 1860	Perry
37th Militia Regiment	2nd Brigade	Col. Charles L. Dawson	March 14, 1860	Sevier
38th Militia Regiment	1st Brigade	Col. James W. M. Murphy	January 31, 1860	Pike
39th Militia Regiment	1st Brigade	Col. Joab B. Brooks	February 20, 1860	Ouachita
40th Militia Regiment	1st Brigade	Col. John H. Hamiter	February 11, 1860	Layfette
41st Militia Regiment	7th Brigade	Col. Pleasant Fowler	May 10, 1860	Newton
42nd Militia Regiment	7th Brigade	Col. John J. Kemp	April 18, 1860	Izard
43rd Militia Regiment	7th Brigade	Col. Thomas Srable	April 18, 1860	Fulton
44th Militia Regiment	4th Brigade	Col. Benjamin Vaughan		Madison
45th Militia Regiment	7th Brigade	Col. Eldridge G. Michell	March 13, 1860	Searcy
46th Militia Regiment	6th Brigade	Col. H.H. Elliot	February 16, 1860	Dallas
47th Militia Regiment	1st Brigade	Col. Robert S. Clayton	February 20, 1860	Hot Springs (Garland)
48th Militia Regiment	5th Brigade	Col. Joseph. B. Barum	February 11, 1860	Mississippi
49th Militia Regiment	1st Brigade	Col. A. S. Alexander	March 9, 1860	Polk
50th Militia Regiment	2nd Brigade	Col. E.E. Dismukes	February 29, 1860	Prairie
51st Militia Regiment	3rd Brigade	Col. Samuel L. Griffing	February 6, 1860	Sebastian
52nd Militia Regiment	6th Brigade	Col. Lawrence H. Belser	March 12, 1860	Drew
53rd Militia Regiment	6th Brigade	Col. William MacKlin	March 26, 1860	Ashley
54th Militia Regiment	6th Brigade	Col. Henry Atkinson	February 18, 1860	Calhoun
55th Militia Regiment	5th Brigade	Col. Adam D. Grayson	March 14, 1860	Craighead
56th Militia Regiment	1st Brigade	Col. James P. Austin	February 11, 1860	Columbia
57th Militia Regiment	1st Brigade	Col. Nathaniel Grant	April 6, 1860	Montgomery
58th Militia Regiment	3rd Brigade	Col. John M. Council	April 20, 1860	Franklin
59th Militia Regiment	8th Brigade	Col. Sterling Allen	June 22, 1860	Independence
60th Militia Regiment	8th Brigade	Col. R. G. Shaver	July 23, 1860	Lawrence
61st Militia Regiment	8th Brigade	Col. J.C. Holmes	July 23, 1860	Lawrence
62nd Militia Regiment	3rd Brigade	Col. William Whitaker	September 3, 1860	Johnson
63rd Militia Regiment	2nd Brigade	Col. David F. Shall	October 9, 1860	Pulaski
64th Militia Regiment	2nd Brigade	Col. John F. Hicks	March 11, 1861	White
65th Militia Regiment	2nd Brigade	Col. Dona Rogers	March 11, 1861	White
66th Militia Regiment	2nd Brigade	Lt Col Caleb Fletcher	November 29, 1861	Saline
67th Militia Regiment	1st Brigade	Col C. W. Paisley	March 11, 1861	Clark
68th Militia Regiment	1st Brigade	Col. E. W. Bacon	March 11, 1861	Columbia
69th Militia Regiment	1st Brigade	Col. Hammon Biskolf	July 8, 1861	Hempstead
70th Militia Regiment				There does not appear to have been a 70th Regiment. Why this number was skipped is unclear.
71st Militia Regiment	4th Brigade	Capt. G. W. Maris	February 5, 1862	Carroll

=== Militia vs. volunteer companies ===
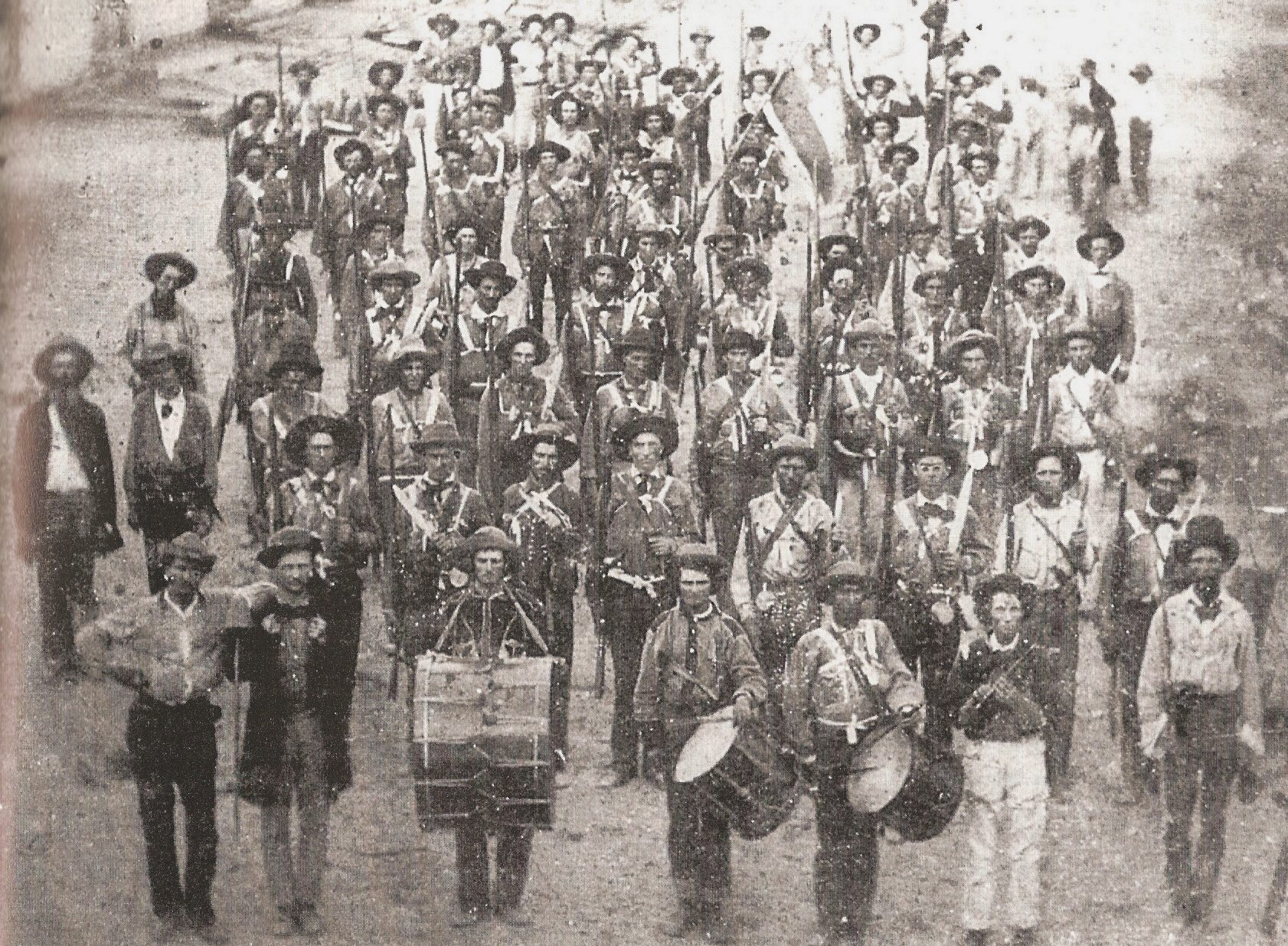
Mustering in the "Hempstead Rifles," Arkansas Volunteers, at Arkadelphia, Arkansas, in 1861.

The Militia Law of Arkansas as published in 1860 provided for a two-tiered militia system. Section one of the law made all able-bodied free white male inhabitants between the ages of 18 and 45 liable for service. The militiamen were required to provide their own weapons and equipment and were to muster four times annually, including two company drills, one battalion muster, and one regimental muster. No provision was made for uniforms for the private militiamen, while officers were required to acquire and wear the uniform of the United States Army. Additionally, section 57 of the act allowed each county to raise up to four Volunteer Companies. These Volunteer Companies were to be either infantry, riflemen, cavalry, or artillery. While the Volunteer Companies were to be separate from the regular militia units, they remained under the supervision and authority of the local militia regimental commander, who was required to set the time and place of the election of officers for volunteer companies and certify their election to the governor. Volunteer Companies were required to drill at least once per month (although the Pulaski Artillery, a Volunteer Artillery Company organized in Little Rock in December 1860, scheduled drill three times a week). Volunteer Companies were allowed to select and acquire their own uniforms and their officers were authorized to wear the uniform of the company. While the standard militia units were organized into lettered companies organized roughly along township boundaries, Volunteer Companies usually adopted colorful names to set them apart. Membership in the Volunteer Companies was encouraged by the provision that once a militiaman had completed five years service in a Volunteer Company, he was exempted from further militia service.

In a letter "To The Militiamen Of The State Of Arkansas" dated August 27, 1860, Governor Conway exhorted the raising of additional volunteer companies:

All the volunteer companies authorized by law in every county in the state ought to be speedily and thoroughly organized and disciplined, and armed and equipped in the best manner as soon as possible ... It devolves upon each colonel commandant, not only to organize his regiment, but also to have formed within the bounds of his regiment, as many volunteer companies, independent of his regiment, as the law requires, and the number of militiamen will justify.

He commented that if all the volunteer companies authorized by the act were to be raised, the state would have a force of 22,000 volunteers. He explained that the general assembly had yet to pass a law allowing the state to provide arms for all the volunteer companies, and he encouraged the counties to consider taxing themselves in order to raise the funds.

Although several Volunteer Companies were already in existence at various locations around the state, the Governor's call sparked a wave of formations. State newspapers in the summer and fall of 1860 have several stories of volunteer companies being formed, drilling, and participating in the regular muster of the militia regiments. The leaders of these volunteer companies began to search for uniforms and equipment, often requesting them through militia channels to the Governor, but then turning to private sources when the State Government was unable to help. The state legislature responded to the need for arms and equipment in January 1861 by appropriating $100,000 for the arming and equipping of the militia being formed into volunteer companies. Act Number 192, which was approved on January 21, 1861, appropriated money "for the purpose of arming the volunteer militia of this state, when formed into volunteer military companies ..."

Section 2. Whenever the several colonels or captains ... shall notify the governor that a volunteer company of not less than fifty men ... has been formed and organized ... he is hereby required to cause to be delivered ... arms and accoutrements suitable to such company ...

In the beginning, these companies continued to operate under the authority of the local militia commander, with the local regimental commander overseeing the election of officers and forwarding the election results to the Governor. After the state actually seceded in May 1861, Volunteer Companies and Regiments would be raised under the authority of the State Military Board, or directly by Confederate Government authorities.

The readiness of the Militia organizations was compared to that of the Volunteer Companies springing up around the state when the Crawford County Militia, the 5th Regiment Arkansas Militia, conducted its annual muster and drill on February 23, 1861, at Van Buren. They were joined on this occasion by two companies of volunteers, the Frontier Guards (led by Captain Hugh Thomas Brown) and the Independent Light Horse Guards (under Captain Powhatan Perkins). The two independent companies received rave reviews for their drill, but the performance of the 5th Militia Regiment provoked the following report from the Van Buren Press:

The special parade of this Regiment, by order of the Officers in command, took place in this City on Saturday last. In connection therewith, the Rifle Company, Capt. Brown, and Horse Company, Capt. Perkins, paraded, making a fine display—and in fact all the 'military' on the ground was composed of these two independent companies. A more decided burlesque on military parade could not be had, than the muster on Saturday. If any good was derived by bringing such a body of men together, for 'inspection' and 'drill,' we were not able to discover it—and we trust it will be at least a year, before another 'occasion' occurs for preparation to defend our rights and liberties against northern aggression.

A more favorable account comes from a report on the September 1860 muster of Pulaski County's 13th Militia Regiment:

The regiment, composed of ten companies, numbering about a thousand men, was drawn up in line of battle facing to the west ... The regiment having been reviewed in form, changed direction to the right, and now in its turn, while the reviewing officers took position on the former front, marched before them by companies, in the following order: Pulaski Lancers, Lieut. Morrison, commanding cavalry, with lances, pennants and handsome uniforms of blue and red, well drilled, and presenting a very gallant appearance; 1st comp. the Capital Guards, Capt. Peay, drilled like veterans of the 'Old Guard', and dressed in a uniform of blue and gold, never yet surpassed in taste and neatness; 2d company, exceeding well drilled and fine looking, Capt. Stillwell; 3d company, composed of gallant looking and intelligent men, Lieut. Griffith, commanding; 4th company, the elite of the regiment, Sergeant Lee of the 'Guards', commanding; 5th company presenting a most soldierly appearance, Capt. Johnson; 6th company, with the step and front of courage and intelligence, Capt. Bushnell; 7th company brave looking, erect and well-drilled, Capt. Vance; 8th company looking as if they might have seen service, and would like to see it again, Capt. Marshall; 9th company who we will venture to say, are all good riflemen, and familiar with the smell of gun powder, Capt. Wellman.

Following the parade of the 13th Regiment, Brigadier General Holt and the regimental officers gathered in front of Governor Conway's home and heard a speech in which the governor complimented them "upon the revival, at a critical time, of the military spirit which once animated the people, but seemed long to have been dead."

In October an article appeared in the same paper announcing a drill contest to be conducted as a part of a Fair scheduled for November 8–9, 1860, on the grounds of St John's College in Little Rock. The best-drilled militia company was to receive a "Premium".

=== Volunteer companies organized in the state militia ===
This list includes volunteer militia companies which were organized in accordance with Section 57 of the 1860 Militia Law, by having the election of their company officers certified by the Colonel commanding the local militia regiment, or whose association with the local militia regiment can be documented through contemporary accounts.

Regiment	Company	Company Commander	Date of Election/Commission	County
1st Militia Regiment	"Home Defenders", Cavalry Company	Captain Logan Fitzhugh	February 8, 1861	Arkansas
1st Militia Regiment	"Dewitt Guards", Company Number 1	Captain D. B. Quertermous	February 8, 1861	Arkansas
1st Militia Regiment	"Dixie Grays"	Captain Sam G. Smith	June 1, 1861	Arkansas
1st Militia Regiment	"Arkansas Riflemen"	Captain C.C. Goddard	June 26, 1861	Arkansas
2nd Militia Regiment	"Spavinaw Volunteer Rifle Company"	Captain David C. Patten	February 21, 1861	Benton
4th Militia Regiment	"Volunteer Light Infantry Company" a.k.a. the "Springfield Sharpshooters"	Captain S. S. Ford	July 27, 1860	Conway
4th Militia Regiment	"Volunteer Cavalry Company"	Captain William D. Adams	October 13, 1860	Conway
4th Militia Regiment	"Mounted Rifle Company" Also known as, "McCulloch Rangers"	Captain R. W. Harper	May 1, 1861	Conway
5th Militia Regiment	"Van Buren Frontier Guards"	Captain Hugh T. Brown	January 12, 1861	Crawford
5th Militia Regiment	"Independent Light Horse Guards"	Captain Powhatan Perkins	Prior to February 23, 1861	Crawford
5th Militia Regiment	"Crawford County Rangers"	Captain William S. Pennyhouse, later, Captain Thomas B. Brantley	March 21, 1861	Crawford
5th Militia Regiment	"Pope Walker Guards"	Captain Charles A. Carroll	June 14, 1861	Crawford
6th Militia Regiment	"Napoleon Grays"	Captain Henry E. Green	February 28, 1861	Desha
6th Militia Regiment	"Napoleon Cavalry"	Captain J. L. Porter	March 7, 1861	Desha
6th Militia Regiment	"Home Guards"	Captain O. F. Parrish	March 8, 1861	Desha
7th Militia Regiment	"Volunteer Company Cavalry"	Captain Robert C. Tweedy	November 21, 1860	Franklin
7th Militia Regiment	"Volunteer Company Cavalry"	Captain John J. Walker	May 1, 1861	Franklin
7th Militia Regiment	"Volunteer Company Cavalry"	Captain John R. Titsworth	June 3, 1861	Franklin
7th Militia Regiment	"Volunteer Company Rangers"	Captain Albert H. Moffit	June 3, 1861	Franklin
7th Militia Regiment	"Ozark Rifles"	Captain David Alexander Stewart	July 1, 1861	Franklin
8th Militia Regiment	"Volunteer Company Cavalry"	Captain John H. Hall	June 25, 1860	Hempstead
8th Militia Regiment	"Nashville Blues" Also known as the "Davis Blues"	Captain Sims McCoran, later by Captain Joseph L. Neal and finally by Captain Augustus S. Hutchinson	March 20, 1861	Hempstead
8th Militia Regiment	"Hempstead Riflemen"	Captain John R. Gratiot	January 12, 1861	Hempstead
8th Militia Regiment	"Hempstead Cavalry"	Captain George E. Gamble	May 28, 1861	Hempstead
8th Militia Regiment	"Confederate Guards"	Captain John A. Rowles	July 8, 1861	Hempstead
10th Militia Regiment	"Clarksville Riflemen"	Captain Oliver Basham	January 18, 1860	Johnson
10th Militia Regiment	"Independent Company Riflemen" also known as "Johnson Guards"	Captain Alfred Dixon King	November 27, 1860	Johnson
10th Militia Regiment	"Independent Company Cavalry"	Captain Lynus Armstrong	December 28, 1860	Johnson
10th Militia Regiment	"Johnson Mounted Rifles"	Captain Oliver Basham	May 22, 1861	Johnson
10th Militia Regiment	"Volunteer Company Infantry"	Captain J. W. Ring	June 12, 1861	Johnson
10th Militia Regiment	" Johnson County Lancers"	Captain Baston W. Cox	June 18, 1861	Johnson
10th Militia Regiment	"South Johnson Rifles"	Captain George Turner	July 10, 1861	Johnson
11th Militia Regiment	"Volunteer Company Militia"	Captain Patrick Saunders	June 3, 1861	Madison
12th Militia Regiment	"Volunteer Company Cavalry"	Captain M.G. B. Scafe	September 17, 1860	Phillips
12th Militia Regiment	"Volunteer Company Light Infantry" also known as "Phillips Guards"	Captain George Otey	September 9, 1860	Phillips
12th Militia Regiment	"Yell Riflemen"	Captain Patrick R. Cleburne	February 18, 1861	Phillips
12th Militia Regiment	"LaGrange Cavalry"	Captain Thomas Gist	February 18, 1861	Phillips
12th Militia Regiment	"Tappan Guards"	Captain James C. Tappan	May 23, 1861	Phillips
12th Militia Regiment	"Artillery Company Helena Greys"	Captain J. C. Clendening	December 11, 1861	Phillips
13th Militia Regiment	"Little Rock Guards" also known as "Capitol Guards"	Captain John C. Peay, later	September 25, 1858	Pulaski
13th Militia Regiment	"Pulaski Lancers"	Captain Thomas J. Churchill	March 16, 1860	Pulaski
13th Militia Regiment	"Totten Artillery Company" later "Pulaski Light Artillery"	Captain Robert C. Newton, later Captain William E. Woodruff, Jr.	March 22, 1861	Pulaski
13th Militia Regiment	"Peyton's Rifles"	Captain Daniel W. Ringo	April 20, 1861	Pulaski
13th Militia Regiment	"Volunteer Company Artillery" also known as Trigg's Arkansas Battery	Captain John Trigg	May 22, 1861	Pulaski
13th Militia Regiment	"Pulaski Rangers"	Captain R. W. Stevenson	June 3, 1861	Pulaski
14th Militia Regiment	"Harrisburg Riflemen"	Captain Granville F. Smith	June 3, 1861	Poinsett
14th Militia Regiment	"Harrisburg Vindicators"	Captain Benjamin Harris	August 1, 1861	Poinsett
14th Militia Regiment	"Volunteer Company"	Captain James Shearer	August 6, 1861	Poinsett
14th Militia Regiment	"Confederate Greys"	Captain Evan Watkins	August 10, 1861	Poinsett
14th Militia Regiment	"Rough and Ready"	Captain William F. J. Clements	August 10, 1861	Poinsett
14th Militia Regiment	"Tappan Guards"	Captain Robert B. Lambert	August 10, 1861	Poinsett
14th Militia Regiment	"Volunteer Company"	Captain Andrew Balfou	August 12, 1861	Poinsett
15th Militia Regiment	Volunteer Cavalry Company, also known as "Galla Rangers"	Captain . W. W. Raukins, later Capt. P.W. Parker Capt	August 20, 1860	Pope
15th Militia Regiment	Volunteer Light Infantry or Riflemen Company	Captain A. D. Oats	January 8, 1861	Pope
15th Militia Regiment	"Norristown Guards"	Captain William D. Caldwell, later Capt. L. W. Burges	May 13, 1861	Pope
15th Militia Regiment	"Dover Mounted Riflemen "	Captain John H. Scott	June 12, 1861	Pope
15th Militia Regiment	"Pope County Lancers "	Captain Thos. P. Linton	June 13, 1861	Pope
15th Militia Regiment	"Volunteer Company Infantry"	Captain Caleb Davis	June 24, 1861	Pope
15th Militia Regiment	"Volunteer Company Cavalry"	Captain Samuel Brown	March 31, 1862	Pope
17th Militia Regiment	"Company Mounted Riflemen"	Captain Daniel Williams	June 4, 1860	Scott
17th Militia Regiment	"Company of Cavalry"	Captain George W. Featherston	June 4, 1860	Scott
18th Militia Regiment	"Volunteer Infantry Company"	Captain Samuel Abby	May 16, 1860	Saline
18th Militia Regiment	"Volunteer Infantry Company "	Captain J. D. Heuster	May 16, 1860	Saline
18th Militia Regiment	"Saline Rifle Rangers"	Captain Mazarine J. Henderson	May 29, 1861	Saline
19th Militia Regiment	"Home Guards"	Captain R. C. Harris	May 3, 1861	St. Frances
19th Militia Regiment	"Linden Dead Shots"	Captain Poindexter Dunn	May 16, 1861	St. Frances
19th Militia Regiment	"Richland Rangers"	Captain John C. Johnson	August 26, 1861	St. Frances
20th Militia Regiment	"Washington Rifle Guards"	Captain George C. North	January 7, 1860	Washington
20th Militia Regiment	"Washington Mounted Rifles"	Captain James M. Tuttle	February 18, 1860	Washington
20th Militia Regiment	"Volunteer Company L. Infantry" also known as the "Pike Guards"	Captain Samuel R. Bell	May 29, 1861	Washington
20th Militia Regiment	"Volunteer Company Cavalry"	Captain Thomas Kelly	May 28, 1861	Washington
21st Militia Regiment	"Volunteer Company Cavalry"	Captain James M. West	September 14, 1860	White
21st Militia Regiment	"Volunteer Company Light Infantry", Also Known as the "Arkansas Guards"	Captain Dandridge McRae, Later Capt John C. McCauley	September 12, 1860	White
22nd Militia Regiment	"Quitman Rifles"	Captain Allen R. Witt	June 24, 1861	Van Buren
23rd Militia Regiment	"Chicot Rangers"	Captain Jacob Connell, 2nd Lieut Daniel H. Reynolds	October 3, 1860	Chicot
24th Militia Regiment	"Jefferson Guards"	Captain Charles H. Carlton	September 24, 1860	Jefferson
24th Militia Regiment	"Southern Guards"	Captain Joseph W. Bocage	December 18, 1860	Jefferson
24th Militia Regiment	"Pine Bluff Artillery"	Captain Frederick Stick	April 21, 1861	Jefferson
24th Militia Regiment	"Bradley Guards"	Captain J. Bradley	June 17, 1861	Jefferson
24th Militia Regiment	"McCullock Guards"	Captain George W. Bayne	July 24, 1861	Jefferson
24th Militia Regiment	"Arkansas Travellers"	Captain R. M. Wallace	July 24, 1861	Jefferson
24th Militia Regiment	"Hardee Guards"	Captain James T. Armstrong	August 2, 1861	Jefferson
25th Militia Regiment	"Volunteer Company Cavalry"	Captain Reed Shell	February 19, 1861	Lawrence
25th Militia Regiment	"Volunteer Company Infantry"	Captain Samuel J. Herndon	February 19, 1861	Lawrence
26th Militia Regiment	"Dardanelle Rangers" also known as "Yell County Rifles"	Captain Thomas J. Daniel	May 6, 1861	Yell
26th Militia Regiment	"Yell Blues"	Captain Cornelius S. Lawrence	May 22, 1861	Yell
26th Militia Regiment	Mounted Volunteer Company	Captain John Connally	September 13, 1864	Yell
27th Militia Regiment	"Sweeney Riflemen"	Captain B. F. Swinney	January 26, 1861	Bradley
28th Militia Regiment	"Arkadelphia Guards"	Captain Charles Stakes	May 1, 1860	Clark
28th Militia Regiment	"Clark County Light Artillery"	Captain Frank Roberts	March 29, 1861	Clark
28th Militia Regiment	"Jackson Blues"	Captain Shaw	March 29, 1861	Clark
28th Militia Regiment	Volunteer Company	Captain Harris Flanagin	August 1, 1861	Clark
29th Militia Regiment	"Eldorado Troop	Captain F. W. Chipman	February 15, 1861	Union
30th Militia Regiment	"Crittenden Rangers"	Captain Frank B. Rodgers	April 10, 1861	Crittenden
30th Militia Regiment	"Mound City Greys"	Captain Braxton C. Crump	July 5, 1861	Crittenden
31st Militia Regiment	"Volunteer Company Cavalry"	Captain Eli Dodson	June 13, 1860	Marion
31st Militia Regiment	"Volunteer Company Cavalry"	Captain William Christmas Mitchell	June 14, 1861	Marion
32nd Militia Regiment	"Volunteer Company Cavalry"	Captain S.L. Mans	March 15, 1861	Washington
32nd Militia Regiment	"Washington County Mounted Volunteers"	Captain William T. Neal	June 5, 1861	Washington
32nd Militia Regiment	"Washington Volunteer Company Mounted Guards"	Captain Samuel G. Howkey	June 14, 1861	Washington
32nd Militia Regiment	"Washington Volunteer Company"	Captain Andrew Johnston	June 14, 1861	Washington
32nd Militia Regiment	Illinois Township Volunteer Company	Captain Joseph R. Parks	August 22, 1861	Washington
32nd Militia Regiment	Mountain Township Volunteer Company	Captain Thomas Gray	August 22, 1861	Washington
32nd Militia Regiment	Cove Creek Township Volunteer Company	Captain William Hulee	August 22, 1861	Washington
32nd Militia Regiment	Morris Hill Township Volunteer Company	Captain P.L. Crawford	November 9, 1861	Washington
32nd Militia Regiment	Morris Hill Township Volunteer Company	Captain A.G. Lewis	November 9, 1861	Washington
33rd Militia Regiment	"Gainesville Guards"	Captain Flavius S. White	July 8, 1861	Green
34th Militia Regiment	"Jackson Guards"	Captain Wiley M. Mitchell	March 8, 1860	Jackson
34th Militia Regiment	"Glaize Rifles"	Captain George E. Orme	December 28, 1860	Jackson
34th Militia Regiment	"Augusta Cavalry" Also Known as "August Rifles"	Captain Charles H. Matlock	December 28, 1860	Jackson
34th Militia Regiment	"Rifles Rangers"	Captain James Wilson	May 31, 1861	Jackson
34th Militia Regiment	"Volunteer Company Cavalry"	Captain William K. Patterson	June 5, 1861	Jackson
34th Militia Regiment	"McCown's Artillery", Also known as "Jackson Light Artillery"	Captain George W. McGowan	June 15, 1861	Jackson
34th Militia Regiment	"Star Rangers"	Captain John H. Dowell	June 19, 1861	Jackson
35th Militia Regiment	"Volunteer Rifle Company"	Captain M.E. Jefferson	March 11, 1861	Monroe
35th Militia Regiment	"Monroe Cavalry"	Captain James R. Jackson	April 29, 1861	Monroe
35th Militia Regiment	"Monroe Blues"	Captain Gaston K. Baldwin	May 16, 1861	Monroe
35th Militia Regiment	"Harris Guards"	Captain James T. Harris	May 27, 1861	Monroe
35th Militia Regiment	Volunteer Infantry Company	Captain J. R. Jackson	December 30, 1861	Monroe
36th Militia Regiment	Perry Rangers	Captain William H. Blackwell	May 28, 1861	Monroe
37th Militia Regiment	"Rector Cavalry"	Captain J. R. Arnold	March 11, 1861	Sevier
37th Militia Regiment	"Volunteer Cavalry", Also known as the "Sevier County Stars"	Captain John G. McKean	May 29, 1861	Sevier
37th Militia Regiment	"Rocky Cought Cavalry"	Captain J. D. Laue	March 11, 1861	Sevier
37th Militia Regiment	"Red River Mounted Riflemen"	Captain William D. Cook	June 25, 1861	Sevier
37th Militia Regiment	"Southern Flag"	Captain B. A. Abernathy	August 18, 1861	Sevier
39th Militia Regiment	"Camden Knights"	Captain William L. Crenshaw	April 29, 1861	Ouachita
39th Militia Regiment	"City Guard"	Captain Richard Lyon	May 9, 1861	Ouachita
39th Militia Regiment	"Mountain Rangers"	Captain James M. Gee	May 23, 1861	Ouachita
39th Militia Regiment	"Bradley Guards"	Captain Edward Woodland	May 29, 1861	Ouachita
39th Militia Regiment	"Ouachita Volunteers" later, "Ouachita Voltiquers"	Captain John W. Kingswell	May 31, 1861	Ouachita
39th Militia Regiment	"Ouachita Greys"	Captain Hope T. Hodnett	June 1, 1861	Ouachita
39th Militia Regiment	"Ouachita Guard"	Captain Joseph R. White	June 3, 1861	Ouachita
39th Militia Regiment	"Ouachita Cavalry"	Captain John Quillin	June 5, 1861	Ouachita
40th Militia Regiment	"Lafayette Guards"	Captain Sam H. Dill	June 3, 1861	Lafayette
41st Militia Regiment	"Volunteer Company"	Captain James Meguffa	August 10, 1861	Newton
41st Militia Regiment	"Volunteer Company"	Captain E.M. Moore	August 10, 1861	Newton
43rd Militia Regiment	"Volunteer Company Infantry"	Captain James M. Ackin	September 2, 1860	Izard
43rd Militia Regiment	"Volunteer Company Infantry"	Captain William S. Linsway	September 2, 1860	Izard
46th Militia Regiment	"Volunteer Light Horse Company"	Captain William T M. Holman	July 26, 1860	Dallas
46th Militia Regiment	"Volunteer Company Rifleman"	Captain F J. Commonoer	May 9, 1861	Dallas
46th Militia Regiment	"Volunteer Company Rifleman"	Captain E. P. Chandler	May 30, 1861	Dallas
47th Militia Regiment	"Mountain Minute Men"	Captain Robert S. Clayton	December 25, 1861	Hot Springs
47th Militia Regiment	"Hot Springs Guards"	Captain E. H. Stewart	May 2, 1861	Hot Springs
47th Militia Regiment	"Hot Springs Rangers"	Captain Joseph Jester	June 19, 1861	Hot Springs
48th Militia Regiment	"Osceola Stars"	Captain J. B. Murray	March 10, 1861	Mississippi
49th Militia Regiment	"Border Guards"	Captain Wiley Stinnett	May 21, 1861	Polk
50th Militia Regiment	"Volunteer Company Cavalry"	Captain B. L. Anthony	October 31, 1860	Prairie
50th Militia Regiment	"Rector Guards"	Captain George W. Glenn	February 12, 1861	Prairie
50th Militia Regiment	"Brownsville Guards"	Captain Robert S. Gantt	May 2, 1861	Prairie
50th Militia Regiment	"Austin Rifles"	Captain Andrew J. Gingles	May 22, 1861	Prairie
50th Militia Regiment	"Des Arc Rangers"	Captain John S. Pearson	June 3, 1861	Prairie
50th Militia Regiment	"Volunteer Company A"	Captain M.M. McKay	November 12, 1861	Prairie
50th Militia Regiment	"Volunteer Company B"	Captain John D. Thomas	November 12, 1861	Prairie
50th Militia Regiment	"Volunteer Company C"	Captain Felix R. Gleaves	November 12, 1861	Prairie
50th Militia Regiment	"Volunteer Company D"	Captain Wiley Nicholas	November 12, 1861	Prairie
50th Militia Regiment	"Volunteer Company E"	Captain James H. Edminson	November 12, 1861	Prairie
50th Militia Regiment	"Volunteer Company F"	Captain A H. Burns	November 12, 1861	Prairie
50th Militia Regiment	"Volunteer Company G"	Captain William T High	November 12, 1861	Prairie
50th Militia Regiment	"Volunteer Company H"	Captain W.J. McCombs	November 12, 1861	Prairie
50th Militia Regiment	"Volunteer Company I"	Captain S. C. Pican	December 21, 1861	Prairie
51st Militia Regiment	"Fort Smith Rifles"	Captain James H. Sparks	January 12, 1860	Sebastian
51st Militia Regiment	"Bell Point Guards"	Captain W. R. Hartzig	July 10, 1860	Sebastian
51st Militia Regiment	"Sebastian County Volunteers"	Captain Jackson J. Edward	August 7, 1860	Sebastian
51st Militia Regiment	Horse Company "Mountain Rangers"	Captain Joseph M. McDonald	August 30, 1860	Sebastian
51st Militia Regiment	"Independent Artillery" Also known as "Fort Smith Battery"	Captain John G. Reid	September 27, 1860	Sebastian
51st Militia Regiment	"Light Cavalry Company Fort Smith" Also known as "Sebastian County Cavalry"	Captain Thomas Lewis	May 17, 1861	Sebastian
51st Militia Regiment	"Volunteer Company Cavalry"	Captain Thomas McCamon	May 27, 1861	Sebastian
51st Militia Regiment	"Volunteer Company Cavalry B"	Captain Henry C. Dunne	June 5, 1861	Sebastian
52nd Militia Regiment	"The Drew Light Horse"	Captain H. S. Hudspeth	August 13, 1861	Drew
53rd Militia Regiment	"Ashley Rangers"	Captain William Tensley	March 27, 1861	Ashley
53rd Militia Regiment	"Volunteer Rifle Company" Later the "Ashley Volunteers"	Captain Unreadable, later Vannoy Hartrog Manning,	May 21, 1861	Ashley
54th Militia Regiment	"Yellow Jackets"	Captain Philip Henry Echols	May 9, 1861	Calhoun
54th Militia Regiment	"Moro Greys" later the "Calhoun Escopets"	Captain Algernon S. Holderness	May 9, 1861	Calhoun
55th Militia Regiment	"Craighead Blues"	Captain Simpson Albright	June 5, 1861	Craighead
55th Militia Regiment	"Confederate Greys"	Captain James Pollard	August 18, 1861	Craighead
56th Militia Regiment	"Columbia Guards"	Captain D. L. Kilgore	May 10, 1861	Columbia
56th Militia Regiment	"Columbian County Cavalry"	Captain W.N.C. Read	May 10, 1861	Columbia
56th Militia Regiment	Volunteer Company	Captain James Sewell	August 10, 1861	Columbia
58th Militia Regiment	Volunteer Company (Rifle) Franklin Guards	Captain E.B. Knotts	February 28, 1861	Franklin County
58th Militia Regiment	Dixie Blues	Captain A. S. Cabell	May 10, 1861	Franklin County
58th Militia Regiment	Volunteer Company E	Captain Daniel Henry	June 4, 1861	Franklin County
59th Militia Regiment	"Independence Guards"	Captain Justus F. Tracy	February 15, 1861	Independence
59th Militia Regiment	"Volunteer Infantry Company"	Captain Thomas J. Morgan	June 8, 1861	Independence
60th Militia Regiment	"Lawrence Cavalry"	Captain John Miller	January 16, 1861	Lawrence
60th Militia Regiment	"Lawrence Rangers" also known as "Lawrence Rifles"	Captain Zachariah P. McAlexander	May 8, 1861	Lawrence
60th Militia Regiment	"Shaver Guards" also known as "Dick Johnson Guards"	Captain Carney C. Straughan	June 17, 1861	Lawrence
63rd Militia Regiment	"Volunteer Company Militia Bower Rangers" also known as Danley's Rangers.	Captain Ben F. Danley	June 1, 1861	Pulaski
64th Militia Regiment	"Volunteer Light Infantry Company"	Captain Henry M. Couch, Later Captain George W. McCauley	July 1, 1861	White
64th Militia Regiment	"Volunteer Company"	Captain John Dodd	September 21, 1861	White
65th Militia Regiment	"West Point Rangers" also known as "West Point Rifles"	Captain Joseph F. Hathaway, Later Captain A. T. Jones	May 29, 1861	White
66th Militia Regiment	"Company Horse Guards"	Captain John E. Douglas	May 2, 1861	Saline
67th Militia Regiment	"Volunteer Company "Antoine Rangers"	Captain George Albert Hale	May 18, 1861	Clark
67th Militia Regiment	"Volunteer Company Cavalry	Captain Ruben C. Reed	October 8, 1863	Clark
68th Militia Regiment	"Invincible Guards"	Captain Thomas P. Dockery, Later Captain William H. Dismukes	June 17, 1861	Columbia
68th Militia Regiment	"Columbia Greys"	Captain William Cooke	August 9, 1861	Columbia

== Militia operations: Spring and Summer 1861 ==
=== The secession crisis ===
Lincoln's victory in the presidential election of 1860 triggered South Carolina's declaration of secession from the Union. By February 1861, six more Southern states made similar declarations. On February 7, the seven states adopted a provisional constitution for the Confederate States of America and established their temporary capital at Montgomery, Alabama. A pre-war February Peace Conference of 1861 met in Washington in a failed attempt at resolving the crisis.

As the secession movement grew, people in Arkansas became greatly concerned. In January 1861 the General Assembly called an election for the people to vote on whether Arkansas should hold a convention to consider secession. At the same time the voters were to elect delegates to the convention in case the vote should be favorable. On February 18, 1861, Arkansans voted to call a secession convention, but elected mostly conditional unionist delegates.

==== Seizure of the Federal Arsenal at Little Rock ====
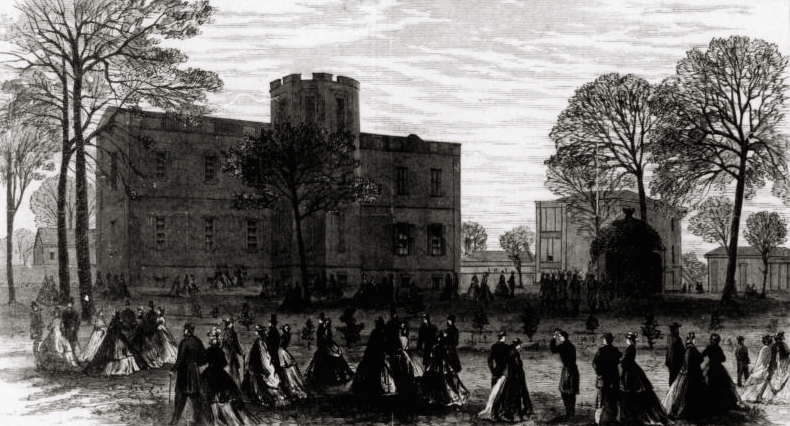
Little Rock Arsenal, early 1800s

Anti-union forces began calling for the seizure of the Federal Arsenal in Little Rock. When rumors were circulated that the Federal Government intended to reinforce the troops at the Little Rock Arsenal, the leading citizens of Helena sent Governor Henry Massey Rector a telegram volunteering 500 men to assist in its seizure. Edmund Burgevin, adjutant general of the Arkansas State Militia, carried the message to the Governor. Burgevin complained of the impropriety of a direct offer of volunteers to the governor of a State which had not seceded, and might not secede. Governor Rector's response was:

The governor has no authority to summon you to take possession of a Federal post, whether threatened to be reinforced or not. Should the people assemble in their defense, the governor will interpose his official position in their behalf.

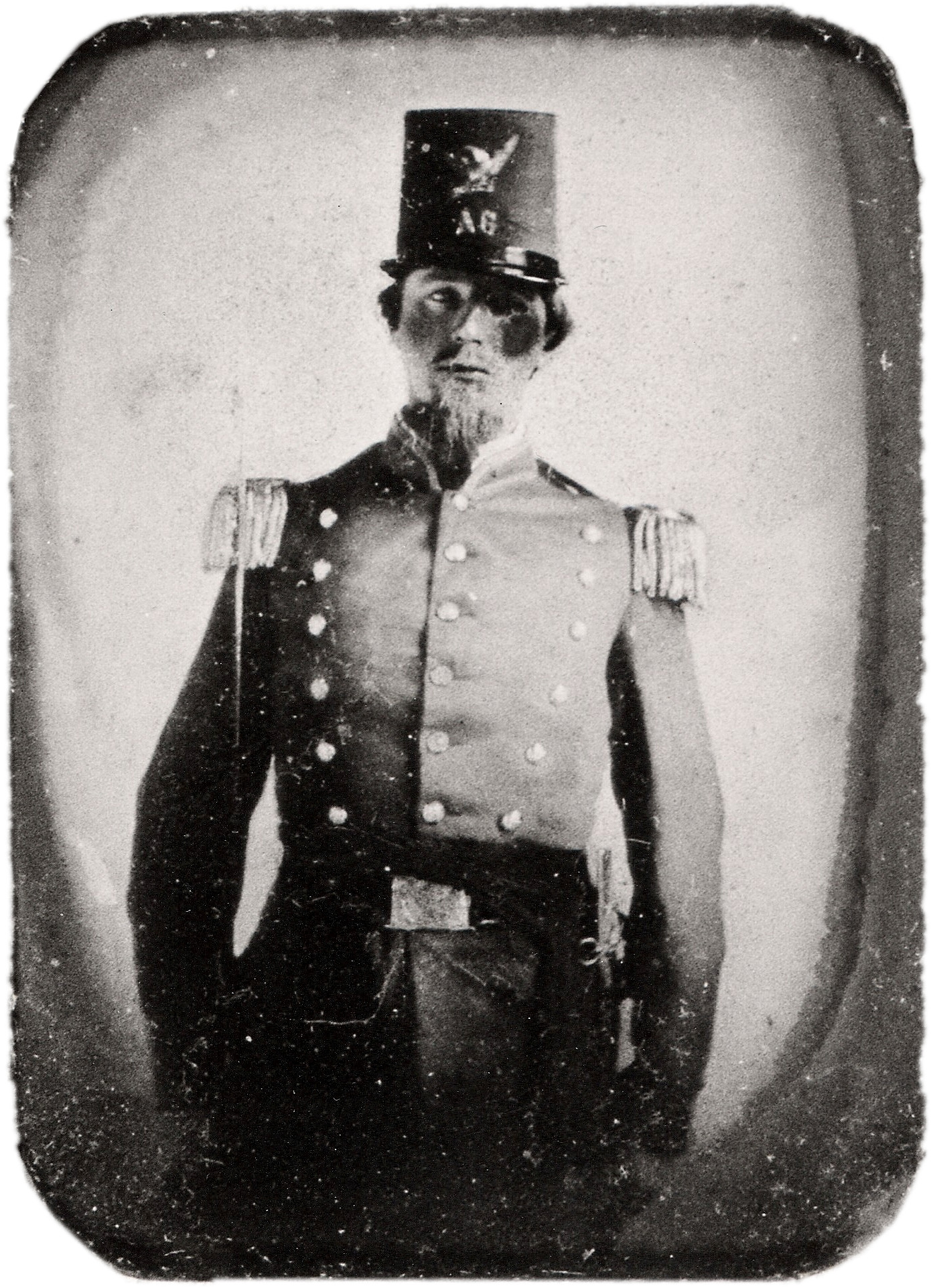
Captain Dandridge McRae commanded the Arkansas Guards, a volunteer militia company from the White County, during the Arsnel crisis. Later, McRea helped organize State Troops at Camp Rector, near Hopefield (present West Memphis). McRea, who was eventually promoted to Brigadier General, also helped raise the "Northwest regiment".

In response to the Governor's message, Militia companies began assembling in Little Rock by February 5, 1861, and they made their intention to seize the Arsenal known to its commander, Captain Totten. The Yell Rifles, including future Confederate General Patrick Cleburne, and the Phillips County Guards (both of Phillips County), were the first companies to reach Little Rock and report to Governor Rector. Governor Rector denied having called the militia forces, and sent the newly arriving companies into camps near the present state capitol building. In addition to the two Phillips County Companies, the Jefferson Guards of Pine Bluff, the Southwestern Guards, and the LaGrange Cavalry responded to the call to seize the Arsenal. Eventually more than a thousand men would assemble, representing Phillips, Jefferson, Prairie, White, Saline, Hot Spring, Montgomery, Monroe, and St Francis counties. Many citizens of Little Rock opposed the occupation of the Arsenal, fearing a loss of life and property. The Little Rock City Council reacted with alarm at this sudden invasion of the capitol by the newly formed volunteer companies and called out its own militia unit, the Capitol Guards, and ordered them to patrol the streets and stand guard over the volunteer companies. Although generally opposed to secession, the Little Rock City Council fear that a battle might ensure within the city itself and passed an ordinance requesting the Governor assume control of the assembling volunteer forces and to seize the Arsenal "to prevent the effusion of blood".

Governor Rector, now armed with the city council's request, took control of the military situation. The 13th Militia Regiment of Pulaski County was activated and Brigadier General Holt, the local militia brigade commander, was placed in command. With militia forces now surrounding the arsenal grounds, Governor Rector dispatched General Thomas D. Merrick, commander of the First Division, Arkansas Militia, with a formal demand for the Arsenal's surrender. Captain James Totten, Arsenal commander, agreed to evacuate the Arsenal in return for safe passage out of the state. Governor Rector agreed and the Militia took control of the Arsenal on February 8, 1861. Totten and his men were escorted from the city by the Capitol Guards. Grateful citizens of Little Rock presented him a sword, which some later came to regret; Totten would eventually meet Arkansas troops on the field of battle. Later, artillery batteries were set up at Helena on the Mississippi River and Pine Bluff on the Arkansas to prevent reinforcement of Federal military posts.

The Yell Rifles returned to Helena, and then moved to Camp Rector, at Mound City, (near present-day West Memphis, Arkansas) where they mustered into state service as Company A, 1st Arkansas Infantry, State Troops. Cleburne was eventually elected to command the new regiment. The Phillips Guards under the command of Captain George Otey, remained in Little Rock to provide a garrison for the newly seized Arsenal.

==== The first Convention on Secession ====
On March 4, 1861, Abraham Lincoln was sworn in as president. In his inaugural address, he argued that the Constitution was a "more perfect union" than the earlier Articles of Confederation and Perpetual Union, that it was a binding contract, and called any secession "legally void". He stated he had no intent to invade the Southern states, nor did he intend to end slavery where it existed, but that he would use force to maintain possession of federal property. His speech closed with a plea for restoration of the bonds of union.

The next day, the Arkansas Secession Convention convened in the State House in Little Rock. David Walker, who opposed secession, was elected president. The convention continued in session for two and a half weeks. Feeling ran high and many fiery speeches were made, but it soon became evident that a majority of the members did not think that the situation at that time called for secession. The convention voted down a resolution condemning Lincoln's inaugural address, and defeated a conditional ordinance of secession. The opinion seemed to prevail that Arkansas should secede only if the Federal government made war on the Confederate States. Still hoping for a compromise settlement that would avoid war, the delegates agreed to go home until after the people had voted on the secession question at a special election to be held in August.

==== Arkansas leaves the Union ====
Fort Monroe in Virginia, Fort Sumter in Charleston, South Carolina, and Fort Pickens, Fort Jefferson, and Fort Taylor, in Florida, were the remaining Union-held forts in the Confederacy, and Lincoln was determined to hold them all. Under orders from Confederate President Jefferson Davis, troops controlled by the Confederate government under P. G. T. Beauregard bombarded Fort Sumter on April 12, forcing its capitulation. Northerners rallied behind Lincoln's call for all the states to send troops to recapture the forts and to preserve the Union, citing presidential powers given by the Militia Acts of 1792. President Lincoln called upon the "militia of the several states" to provide 75,000 troops to put down the rebellion. For months before that, several Northern governors had discreetly readied their state militias; they began to move forces the next day. The first Arkansas Secession Convention had pledged the state to "Resist to the last extremity any attempt on the part of such power (President Lincoln) to coerce any state that had succeeded from the old Union". In spite of the fact that Arkansas had yet to officially secede, a militia battalion was quickly organized under the command of Solon F. Borland. The force, including the Pulaski Lancers, the Capitol Guards, the Pulaski Light Artillery, and Captain Daniel Ringo's Peyton Rifles (all associated with the 13th Militia Regiment, Pulaski County) was dispatched to seize the Federal Arsenal at Fort Smith on April 23, 1861.

The Adjutant General, Edmond Burgevin, provided the state's response to the War Department's demand for troops:

SIR: I am directed by his Excellency the governor to acknowledge the receipt for Special Orders, No. 106, from the War Department at Washington. That order is based on the presumption of the State of Arkansas being willing to furnish the quota of troops required of her for the Federal Army, a presumption entirely improbable, and I can assure you, utterly impossible.

Further, I have to inform you that I had the honor on Tuesday night, April 23, 1861, at Fort Smith, to order the seizure of the person of Maj. R.C. Gatlin, Fifth Infantry, as a prisoner of war, and who is now at large on parole of honor not to serve against the State of Arkansas or the Southern Confederacy.

I am, sir, very respectfully, your obedient servant.

Edmund Burgevin

Adjutant General of Arkansas

Faced with President Lincoln's demand for troops, the Secession Convention reconvened in Little Rock and, on May 6, 1861, passed the ordinance of secession by a vote of 69 to 1. Future Governor Isaac Murphy was the only "No" vote.

The Pulaski Light Artillery was initially assigned to garrison the captured arsenal at Fort Smith. Brigadier General Napoleon Bonapart Burrows, commander of the 8th Brigade, Arkansas Militia was sent to Fort Smith, where he began negotiations with the Chickasaw Nation to occupy Federal forts in the Indian Territory.

=== Organizing Arkansas State Troops ===
The Secession Convention continued to meet and began the process of drafting a new state constitution and ordering the state's military affairs. The new constitution sought to limit the power of the Governor by vesting authority for military matters in a three-person board chaired by the Governor. The Military Board was to oversee the organization of a state army; to arm, feed, and clothe the troops; and to call out the forces for such military expeditions as might be necessary to defend the state. The military board was composed of Governor Rector, Christopher C. Danley of Little Rock, and Benjamin C. Totten of Prairie County. Danley was soon replaced by Samuel W. Williams, who was replaced in turn by L. D. Hill of Perry County. The Secession Convention also adopted an ordinance providing for the organization of an "Army of Arkansas". The Army was to consist of two divisions: the 1st Division in the western portion of the state and the 2nd Division in the eastern portion of the state. Each division was to be commanded by a brigadier general. While called "divisions", the formations were actually intended to be of brigade size, with each being composed of four regiments of infantry and two artillery batteries. The ordinance required each regiment to consist of not less than six companies and not more than 10. Each company was to consist of not less than 64 men and not more than 96 men and four officers. The officers were to be elected by the men of the regiment. $2 million was appropriated to fund the Board.

The Convention elected three of its members as commanders of the new army: Major General James Yell of Jefferson County (overall commander) Nicholas Bartlett Pearce, a graduate of West Point and resident of Benton County (commander of the First Division), and Thomas H. Bradley of Crittenden County (commander of the Second Division). Historian Leo Huff has referred to these commanders as "three political generals"; however, each had some connection to the militia. Major General Yell had served as the commander of the 2nd Division of the Arkansas Militia, Brigadier General Pearce had served as the Colonel of the Benton County Militia Regiment, and Brigadier General Thomas H. Bradley had previously served as a major general in the Tennessee Militia. General Pearce, who had graduated from West Point, had the most military training of the three generals. But all three of these men did harm to the war effort by opposing the transfer of Arkansas troops to a unified Confederate command. Eventually, all three men were either relieved of their command or transferred to other activities.

The Secession Convention enacted an ordinance on May 30, 1861, that called upon all the counties in the State to appoint a "home guard of minute men" for local defense, until regular military regiments could be raised and deployed. These Home Guard units were made up of old men and boys who were not eligible for normal military service. Like the Militia, the Home Guard units were organized at the county level, with companies being supplied by each township. Originally these units were intended to be separate from the state militia. Most counties presumably complied with the law, but records of only a few of these 1861 home guard organizations can now be found. The Independence County Home Guard was established in accordance with this new ordinance. The Independence County Court, in special session, established and made appointments to the local home guard organization on June 29, 1861. Subsequent appointments were made in July, October, and November 1861. About 220 men were appointed in all the townships of the county. Most of them were property owners, many quite prominent and wealthy, and, as far as can be determined, all were over the conscript age. Some were quite elderly. Despite their age, wealth, and social position, many later served in regular Confederate units in the latter part of the war, especially in Dobbin's and Morgan's cavalry regiments. John Farrell Allen was appointed General Commander of the Independence County Home Guard.

==== Mobilizing forces ====
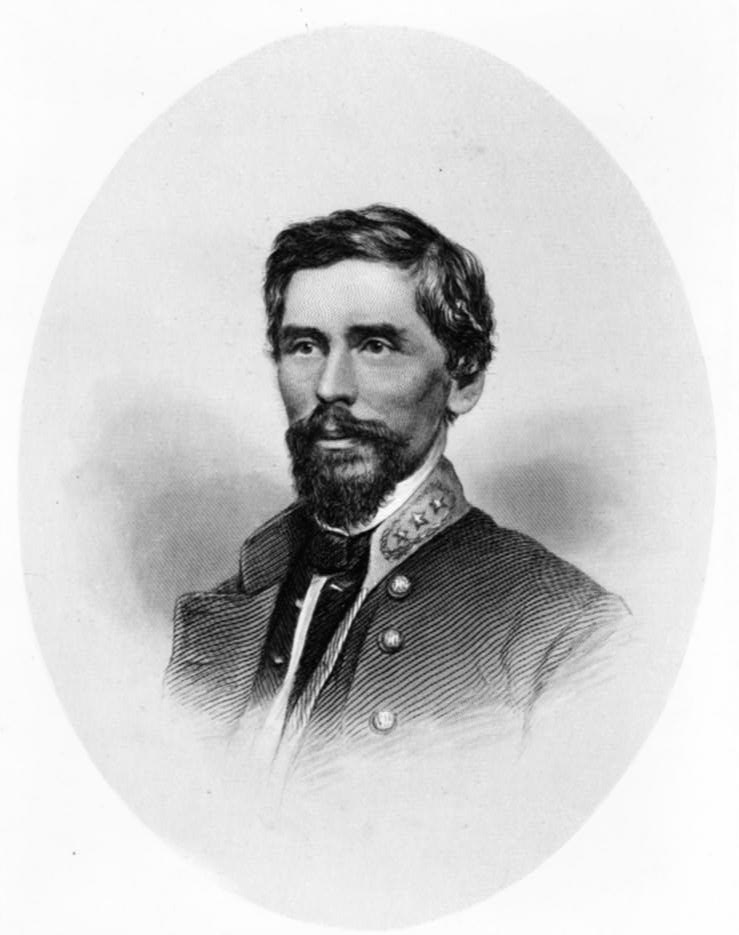
Col. Patrick Cleburne, Commander, 1st Arkansas Infantry, State Troops, a.k.a. 15th Arkansas Volunteer Infantry, Confederate States Army

Militia leaders were hopeful that their existing formations would be mobilized and utilized to defend the state. Brigadier General Jett, commanding the 1st Brigade, Arkansas Militia even wrote directly to Confederate President Jefferson Davis and offered the services of his brigade, which he described as "all officered and ready for action except in arms and munitions of war." The Secession Convention had other plans: they intended for the militia to remain separate from the Confederate forces. The existing militia organizations were to be retained as a source of manpower and a last-ditch defense network. This resulted in many local militia company commanders volunteering their existing forces as new volunteer companies rather than organizing separate Confederate companies.

Efforts to mobilize the state's forces were subject to the competing interest of the State Military Board. The board recognized the need to quickly mobilize troops to defend the state, but wished to avoid as much of the cost of the mobilization as possible. Additionally the Military Board feared that troops raised to defend the state would be diverted into the eastern theater of operations by the Confederate government. This concern quickly proved valid. The board made a decision not to mobilize the existing state militia regiments, and instead began organizing new volunteer regiments. The existing militia law authorized volunteer companies to be organized into regiments and brigades of volunteer troops. The regiments are also referred to as "State Troops" in state records from the period. Existing Volunteer Companies, already organized in the militia, were inducted into these new volunteer regiments. The militia regiments would maintain a separate identity from the State Troops and later Confederate regiments.

The board dispatched Christopher C. Danley of Little Rock to Richmond to open negotiations with the new Confederate government for the transfer of State Troops to the Confederate government. The Board immediately issued a call for 10,000 troops (10 regiments). Acting under the militia law's authority to organize volunteer regiments, Governor Rector had already directed volunteer units to begin organizing, so the first seven regiments were already in the process of organization when the military board issued its call for troops.

Much confusion exists in tracking the formation of military units during the initial months of the war because several different governments (Confederate, state, and county), all with competing interests, were raising troops within the state. The State Military Board was raising units which it hoped to transfer to Confederate service. James F. Fagan, T. B. Flournoy, and Albert Rust received authority directly from the new Confederate government to raise regiments for Confederate service. The War Department assigned the regimental designations of 1st Arkansas Volunteers (Fagan), 2nd Arkansas Volunteers (Hindman), and 3rd Arkansas Volunteers (Rust). The 1st and 3rd Arkansas Regiments organized, armed, and reported themselves ready for active service in May 1861, and received orders to report to Lynchburg, Virginia. Col. Hindman, however, had problems organizing his companies and obtaining arms, perhaps because the Arkansas State Troops were actively organizing in the same area. Col. Hindman's 2nd Arkansas Volunteers did not complete its organization and recruiting until June, and then had trouble getting orders from the War Department. Hindman's regiment was eventually sworn into state service and was then transferred to Confederate service with the rest of the eastern division of the Army of Arkansas.

The Military Board developed its own plan for numbering the regiments of State Troops, but this plan was apparently ignored by the new brigade commanders, who tended to number regiments sequentially based upon the date they were sworn into state service. The plan was also ignored by Confederate authorities, who often renumbered the regiments of State Troops when they were transferred into Confederate service, based on the date they were sworn into the Confederate Army. The result is a great deal of confusion regarding the designation of any particular Arkansas unit.

The 1st Arkansas Infantry, State Troops, commanded by Colonel Patrick R. Cleburne, was one of the first regiments created from the initial wave of Volunteer Companies. Of the eight companies which were inducted into state service as a part of this regiment at Mound City on May 14, 1861, seven had been originally organized as volunteer companies under the militia law. The regiment was initially mustered into the Confederate Army as the 1st Arkansas Volunteer Infantry, Confederate States Army. Later it was determined that another regiment had already received that designation. The unit recognized by the Confederate War Department as the 1st Arkansas Infantry was commanded by Col. James F. Fagan. Col. Fagan had served as a lieutenant with Company C of the Arkansas Regiment of Mounted Volunteers during the War with Mexico. Fagan's regiment was not mustered into state service, but left the state for the Eastern Theater; it was mustered into Confederate service in Lexington, Virginia. Col. Cleburne's 1st Arkansas Infantry, State Troops, was redesignated as the 15th Arkansas Infantry. The confusion did not end there, because a total of three Arkansas Infantry regiments were eventually named the "15th", the first being the aforementioned 1st Arkansas Infantry, State Troops commanded by Col. Cleburne. The new 15th Arkansas moved into camp with the 2nd Division of the Army of Arkansas, under the field command of Major General Yell, in Pocahontas.

==== Volunteer militia companies enlisted in Confederate service ====
The following volunteer companies who were formed under the authority of the antebellum militia laws were inducted into the new regiments of State Troops or directly into Confederate Service:

Company	Militia Regiment	Regiment of State Troops	Confederate Army Regiment
"Dewitt Guards"	1st Militia Regiment		1st Arkansas Infantry Regiment, Company K
"Dixie Grays"	1st Militia Regiment		6th Arkansas Infantry Regiment, Company A
"McCulloch Rangers"	4th Militia Regiment		1st Arkansas Mounted Rifles, Company I,
"Volunteer Light Infantry Company"	4th Militia Regiment		10th Arkansas Infantry Regiment, Company K
"Crawford County Rangers"	5th Militia Regiment		1st Arkansas Cavalry Battalion (Stirman's)
"Van Buren Frontier Guards"	5th Militia Regiment	3rd Regiment, Arkansas State Troops, Company G	35th Arkansas Volunteer Infantry Regiment, Company G,
"Independent Light Horse Guards"	5th Militia Regiment	1st Cavalry Regiment, Arkansas State Troops, Company D	Disbanded after The Battle of Wilson's Creek
"Pope Walker Guards"	5th Militia Regiment	1st Cavalry Regiment, Arkansas State Troops, Company A	Disbanded after Battle of Wilson's Creek
"Napoleon Grays"	6th Militia Regiment	1st Regiment, Arkansas State Troops, Company E	15th Arkansas Infantry Regiment (Josey's), Company C
"Napoleon Rifles" also known as "Napoleon Cavalry"	6th Militia Regiment		1st Arkansas Mounted Rifles, Company G
"Volunteer Company Cavalry"	7th Militia Regiment	5th Regiment, Arkansas State Troops, Company A	Disbanded after Wilson's Creek
"Volunteer Company Cavalry"	7th Militia Regiment	3rd Battalion Arkansas Infantry	15th Arkansas Infantry Regiment, Company I
"Volunteer Company Rangers"	7th Militia Regiment		15th Arkansas Infantry Regiment, Company B
"Volunteer Company Cavalry"	7th Militia Regiment	1st Cavalry Regiment, Arkansas State Troops, Company G	Disbanded after Wilson's Creek
"Ozark Rifles"	7th Militia Regiment		15th Arkansas Infantry Regiment, Company C
"Hempstead Cavalry"	8th Militia Regiment		2nd Arkansas Mounted Rifles, Company H
"Hempstead Riflemen"	8th Militia Regiment	3rd Regiment, Arkansas State Troops, Company B	17th Arkansas Infantry Regiment (Griffith's), Company H,
"Nashville Blues" Also known as the "Davis Blues"	8th Militia Regiment	5th Regiment, Arkansas State Troops, Company F	Disbanded after Wilson's Creek, many members joined Companies G and I, 19th Arkansas Infantry Regiment (Dawson's)
"Confederate Guards"	8th Militia Regiment		4th Arkansas Infantry Regiment, Company E
"Independent Company Riflemen" Also Known As "Johnson Guards"	10th Militia Regiment	3rd Regiment, Arkansas State Troops, Company H	Disbanded following the Battle of Wilson's Creek.
"Johnson Mounted Rifles"	10th Militia Regiment		1st Arkansas Mounted Rifles, Company C
"South Johnson Rifles"	10th Militia Regiment		16th Arkansas Infantry Regiment, Company B
"Independent Company Cavalry"	10th Militia Regiment	1st Cavalry Regiment, Arkansas State Troops, Company C	Disbanded following the Battle of Wilson's Creek.
"Volunteer Company Militia"	11th Militia Regiment	4th Regiment, Arkansas State Troops, Company B	Disbanded following the Battle of Wilson's Creek.
"Phillips Guards"	12th Militia Regiment	1st Regiment, Arkansas State Troops, Company H	15th Arkansas Infantry Regiment (Josey's), Company F
"Yell Riflemen"	12th Militia Regiment	1st Regiment, Arkansas State Troops, Company F	15th Arkansas Infantry Regiment (Josey's), Company B
"Tappan Guards"	12th Militia Regiment		13th Arkansas Infantry Regiment, Company A
"Totten Artillery Company" later "Pulaski Light Artillery"	13th Militia Regiment	Colonel Solon Borland's Militia Battalion, disbanded after Wilson's Creek	reformed later as Weaver Light Artillery 3rd Arkansas Field Battery
"Capitol Guards"	13th Militia Regiment	6th Regiment, Arkansas State Troops, Company A	6th Arkansas Infantry Regiment, Company A
"Pulaski Lancers"	13th Militia Regiment	Colonel Solon Borland's Militia Battalion	1st Arkansas Mounted Rifles, Company F
"Peyton Rifles"	13th Militia Regiment	Colonel Solon Borland's Militia Battalion	25th Arkansas Infantry Regiment, Company F,
"Volunteer Company Artillery" also known as Trigg's Arkansas Battery	13th Militia Regiment		Shoup's Artillery Battalion, Company B.
"Harrisburg Riflemen"	14th Militia Regiment	5th Regiment, Arkansas State Troops (Cross)	5th Arkansas Infantry Regiment, Company F
"Harrisburg Vindicators"	14th Militia Regiment		13th Arkansas Infantry Regiment, Company C
Balfour's "Volunteer Company"	14th Militia Regiment		13th Arkansas Infantry Regiment, Company D
"Rough and Ready"	14th Militia Regiment		13th Arkansas Infantry Regiment, Company F
"Tappan Guards"	14th Militia Regiment		13th Arkansas Infantry Regiment, Company A
Volunteer Cavalry Company, also known as "Galla Rangers"	15th Militia Regiment		2nd Arkansas Mounted Rifles, Company B
Davis's "Volunteer Company Infantry"	15th Militia Regiment		15th Arkansas Infantry Regiment, Company E
"Company of Cavalry"	17th Militia Regiment	1st Cavalry Regiment, Arkansas State Troops, Company H	
"Saline Rifle Rangers"	18th Militia Regiment	Col. Solon Borland's 1st Arkansas Mounted Volunteers	3rd Arkansas Cavalry Regiment, Company C
"Linden Dead Shots"	19th Militia Regiment		18th (Marmaduke's) Arkansas Infantry Regiment, Company E,
"Richland Rangers"	19th Militia Regiment		13th Arkansas Infantry Regiment, Company B
"Volunteer Company L. Infantry" also known as the "Pike Guards"	20th Militia Regiment	3rd Regiment, Arkansas State Troops, Company C	disbanded following Battle of Wilson's Creek
"Volunteer Company Cavalry"	20th Militia Regiment	1st Cavalry Regiment, Arkansas State Troops, Company E	disbanded following Battle of Wilson's Creek
"Quitman Rifles"	22nd Militia Regiment		10th Arkansas Infantry Regiment, Company A,
"Arkansas Guards"	21st Militia Regiment	7th Regiment, Arkansas State Troops, Company K	7th Arkansas Infantry Regiment, Company K
"Chicot Rangers"	23rd Militia Regiment		1st Arkansas Mounted Rifles, Company A
"Southern Guards"	24th Militia Regiment		2nd Arkansas Infantry Regiment, Company H
"Jefferson Guards"	24th Militia Regiment	1st Regiment, Arkansas State Troops, Company B	15th Arkansas Infantry Regiment (Josey's), Company H
"Pine Bluff Artillery"	24th Militia Regiment		18th (Marmaduke's) Arkansas Infantry Regiment, Company G,
"Bradley Guards"	24th Militia Regiment		9th Arkansas Infantry Regiment, Company A,
"Arkansas Travellers"	24th Militia Regiment		9th Arkansas Infantry Regiment, Company G
"Hardee Guards"	24th Militia Regiment		9th Arkansas Infantry Regiment, Company H
"McCullock Guards"	24th Militia Regiment		9th Arkansas Infantry Regiment, Company I
"Volunteer Company Cavalry"	25th Militia Regiment	1st Arkansas Regiment, 30-Day Volunteers, Company G	38th Arkansas Infantry Regiment Company F,
"Volunteer Company Infantry"	25th Militia Regiment		21st Arkansas Infantry Regiment (Craven's), Company F
"Dardanelle Rangers" also known as "Yell County Rifles"	26th Militia Regiment		1st Arkansas Mounted Rifles, Company H
"Yell Blues"	26th Militia Regiment	5th Regiment, Arkansas State Troops, Company D	Disbanded after Battle of Wilson's Creek
"Mounted Volunteer Company"	26th Militia Regiment	3rd Regiment, Arkansas State Cavalry, Company K	10th Arkansas Cavalry Regiment (Newton's), Company K
"Sweeney Riflemen"	27th Militia Regiment	5th Arkansas Infantry Regiment, Company C	
"Clark County Light Artillery"	28th Militia Regiment		2nd Arkansas Light Artillery
Flanagin's "Volunteer Company"	28th Militia Regiment		2nd Arkansas Mounted Rifles, Company F
"Eldorado Troop" later "El Dorado Sentinels"	29th Militia Regiment		1st Arkansas Infantry Regiment, Company A
"Crittenden Rangers"	30th Militia Regiment		6th Arkansas Cavalry Battalion, Company C, and later, 2nd Arkansas Cavalry Regiment (Slemons's)
"Mound City Greys"	30th Militia Regiment		13th Arkansas Infantry Regiment, Company H
Dodson's "Volunteer Company Cavalry"	31st Militia Regiment		14th Arkansas Infantry Regiment (Powers'), Company B
Mitchell's "Volunteer Company Cavalry"	31st Militia Regiment		14th Arkansas Infantry Regiment (Powers'), Company C
"Washington County Mounted Volunteers"	32nd Militia Regiment		16th Arkansas Infantry Regiment, Company G,
"Illinois Township Volunteer Company"	32nd Militia Regiment		17th Arkansas Infantry Regiment (Griffith's), Company E,
"Gainesville Guards"	33rd Militia Regiment		5th Arkansas Infantry Regiment, Company E
"Jackson Guards"	34th Militia Regiment		1st Arkansas Infantry Regiment, Company G
"Glaize Rifles"	34th Militia Regiment	7th Regiment, Arkansas State Troops, Company B	7th Arkansas Infantry Regiment, Company B
"Augusta Cavalry" Also Known as "Augusta Rifles"	34th Militia Regiment		1st Arkansas Mounted Rifles, Company D
"McCowan's Battery"	34th Militia Regiment		Jackson Light Artillery (Thrall's Battery) 3rd Arkansas Light Artillery
"Rifles Rangers"	34th Militia Regiment		8th Arkansas Infantry Regiment, Company B
"Monroe Blues"	35th Militia Regiment	1st Regiment, Arkansas State Troops, Company K	15th Arkansas Infantry Regiment (Josey's), Company E
"Harris Guards"	35th Militia Regiment	1st Regiment, Arkansas State Troops, Company A	15th Arkansas Infantry Regiment (Josey's), Company A
"Perry Rangers"	36th Militia Regiment	1st Arkansas Cavalry Battalion (Borland's)	3rd Arkansas Cavalry Regiment, Company B
"Volunteer Cavalry", Also known as the "Sevier County Stars"	37th Militia Regiment	5th Regiment, Arkansas State Troops, Company H	Disbanded following the Battle of Wilson's Creek, but several members eventually served in Company F, 19th Arkansas Infantry Regiment (Dawson's).
"Southern Flag"	37th Militia Regiment		12th Arkansas Infantry Regiment, Company G
"Red River Mounted Riflemen"	37th Militia Regiment		12th Arkansas Infantry Regiment, Company H
"Camden Knights"	39th Militia Regiment		1st Arkansas Infantry Regiment, Company C
"City Guard"	39th Militia Regiment		6th Arkansas Infantry Regiment, Company H
"Mountain Rangers"	39th Militia Regiment		3rd Arkansas Cavalry Regiment, Company H
"Ouachita Volunteers" later, "Ouachita Voltiquers"	39th Militia Regiment	6th Regiment, Arkansas State Troops, Company D	6th Arkansas Infantry Regiment, Company D
"Ouachita Greys"	39th Militia Regiment	6th Regiment, Arkansas State Troops, Company K	6th Arkansas Infantry Regiment, Company K
"Ouachita Guard"	39th Militia Regiment		12th Arkansas Infantry Regiment, Company C
"Lafayette Guards"	40th Militia Regiment	6th Regiment, Arkansas State Troops, Company F	6th Arkansas Infantry Regiment, Company F
"Volunteer Company Rifleman"	46th Militia Regiment		12th Arkansas Infantry Regiment, Company D
"Mountain Minute Men"	47th Militia Regiment		19th Arkansas Infantry Regiment (Dockery's), Company E
"Hot Springs Rangers"	47th Militia Regiment		3rd Arkansas Cavalry Regiment, Company F
"Rector Guards"	50th Militia Regiment	1st Regiment, Arkansas State Troops, Company D	15th Arkansas Infantry Regiment (Josey's), Company G
"Brownsville Guards"	50th Militia Regiment		5th Arkansas Infantry Regiment, Company G
"Austin Rifles"	50th Militia Regiment		5th Arkansas Infantry Regiment, Company I
"Des Arc Rangers"	50th Militia Regiment		1st Arkansas Mounted Rifles, Company B
"Volunteer Company A"	50th Militia Regiment		25th Arkansas Infantry Regiment, Company I.
"Volunteer Company B"	50th Militia Regiment		25th Arkansas Infantry Regiment, Company C.
"Volunteer Company G"	50th Militia Regiment		2nd Arkansas 30 Day Volunteer Regiment, Company B
"Volunteer Company H"	50th Militia Regiment		2nd Arkansas 30 Day Volunteer Regiment, Company B
"Fort Smith Rifles"	51st Militia Regiment	3rd Regiment, Arkansas State Troops Company A	disbanded following Battle of Wilson's Creek
"Bell Point Guards"	51st Militia Regiment	5th Regiment, Arkansas State Troops, Company G	Disbanded following the Battle of Wilson's Creek.
"Light Cavalry Company Fort Smith" also known as "Sebastian County Cavalry"	51st Militia Regiment	1st Cavalry Regiment, Arkansas State Troops, Company B	Disbanded after Battle of Wilson's Creek
"Independent Artillery" Also known as "Fort Smith Battery"	51st Militia Regiment		1st Arkansas Light Artillery
"The Drew Light Horse"	52nd Militia Regiment	6th Arkansas Cavalry Battalion, Company B	2nd Arkansas Cavalry Regiment (Slemons') Company B,
"Ashley Rangers"	53rd Militia Regiment		13th Louisiana Battalion, Company A
"Volunteer Rifle Company" Later the "Ashley Volunteers"	53rd Militia Regiment		3rd Arkansas Infantry Regiment, Company K
"Moro Greys" later renamed "Calhoun Escopets"	54th Militia Regiment		4th Arkansas Infantry Regiment, Company A
"Yellow Jackets"	54th Militia Regiment	6th Regiment, Arkansas State Troops, Company B	Refused to enter Confederate Service
"Confederate Greys"	55th Militia Regiment		13th Arkansas Infantry Regiment, Company I
"Columbia Guards"	56th Militia Regiment		6th Arkansas Infantry Regiment, Company G
Volunteer Company (Rifle) "Franklin Guards"	58th Militia Regiment		15th Arkansas Infantry Regiment, Company B
"Dixie Blues"	58th Militia Regiment	4th Regiment, Arkansas State Troops, Company D	Disbanded after Battle of Wilson's Creek
"Independence Guards"	59th Militia Regiment		8th Arkansas Infantry Regiment, Company E
"Volunteer Infantry Company"	59th Militia Regiment		8th Arkansas Infantry Regiment, Company D
"Dick Johnson Guards"	60th Militia Regiment	7th Regiment, Arkansas State Troops, Company D	7th Arkansas Infantry Regiment, Company D
"Lawrence Rangers" also known as "Lawrence Rifles"	60th Militia Regiment		1st Arkansas Mounted Rifles, Company E
"Volunteer Company Militia Bower Rangers" also known as "Danley's Rangers"	63rd Militia Regiment	1st Arkansas Cavalry Battalion (Borland's), Company D	3rd Arkansas Cavalry Regiment, Company D
"Volunteer Light Infantry Company"	64th Militia Regiment		8th Arkansas Infantry Regiment, Company C
"West Point Rifles"	65th Militia Regiment		8th Arkansas Infantry Regiment, Company D
"Volunteer Company Cavalry	67th Militia Regiment	Pettus Battalion, Arkansas State Troops, Company B	10th Arkansas Cavalry Regiment (Newton's), Company A
"Invincible Guards"	68th Militia Regiment	5th Regiment, Arkansas State Troops, Company B	Disbanded following the Battle of Wilson's Creek.

=== Order of battle, Provisional Army of Arkansas ===
The new Army of Arkansas was to consist of two divisions: the 1st Division, covering western Arkansas, and the 2nd Division in the eastern half of the state. A major general was to command the Army, while each division was to be under the command of a brigadier general. Each regiment was to consist of six to 10 companies. As was tradition, company officers were elected by the men and regimental officers were elected by the company officers.

Brigadier General Thomas Bradely, who initially commanded the eastern or 2nd Division, was quickly relieved of command after a dispute with Col. Cleburne. Major General Yell assumed command of the 2nd (Eastern) Division and had the following units under his command:

1st Regiment, Arkansas State Troops, (15th Josey's Volunteer Infantry)
5th Regiment (Cross's Regiment), Arkansas State Troops, (5th Arkansas Volunteer Infantry, Confederate States Army)
6th Regiment, Arkansas State Troops, (6th Arkansas Volunteer Infantry, Confederate States Army)
7th Regiment, Arkansas State Troops, (7th Arkansas Volunteer Infantry, Confederate States Army)
Helena Artillery (Key's Battery)
Jackson Light Artillery (McCown's Battery)
Clark County Artillery (Roberts Battery)

Brigadier General Pearce assumed command of the 1st (Western) Division and had the following units under his direct command:

3rd Regiment, Arkansas State Troops, (Gratiot's Regiment)
4th Regiment, Arkansas State Troops, (Walker's Regiment)
5th Regiment, Arkansas State Troops, (Dockery's Regiment)
1st Cavalry Regiment, Arkansas State Troops (Carroll's Regiment)
Pulaski Light Artillery, (Woodruff's Battery).
Fort Smith Artillery, (Ried's Battery)

On July 14, 1861, Confederate Brigadier General William J. Hardee arrived in Little Rock to assume unified Confederate command in the state. The following day the state Military Board signed an "Article of Transfer", which provided that all state forces (excepting the militia), some 10,000 men, would be transferred on a voluntary basis to the command of the Confederate States of America. All weapons, ammunition, and supplies were also to be transferred. Before the transfer could take place, Arkansas State Troops got their first taste of real battle.

=== State troops and the Battle of Wilson's Creek ===
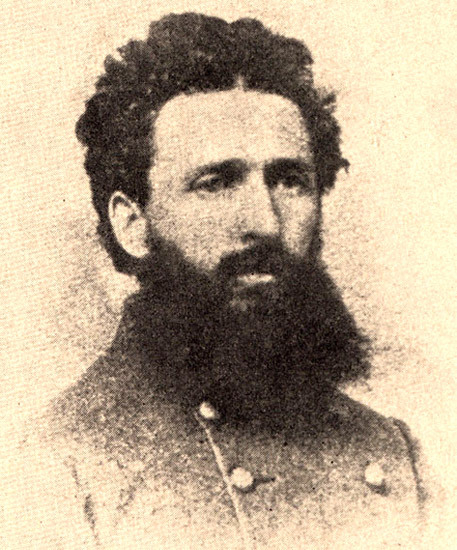
Brigadier General Nicholas Bartlett Pearce, Commander, Western Division, Provisional Army of Arkansas

Brigadier General Pearce, who lived in Benton County, established the headquarters, 1st Division, Provisional Army of Arkansas at Camp Walker at Maysville. Thus when a Union army began operating around Springfield in Southwest Missouri, Pearce's state troops were nearby. Pearce's troops, which are referred to as a brigade of State Troops in the official accounts of the battle, numbered 2,234 troops. Pearce agreed to co-operate with Brigadier General Benjamin McCulloch and his force of about 8,000 other soldiers from several commands, to form a sizable force and immediately marched toward Springfield. On August 10, 1861, Brigadier General Nathaniel Lyon, the forceful commander of Union troops in Missouri, attacked the Confederates. The ensuing day-long battle was fought on a number of fronts. Captain William E. Woodruff, Jr., commander of the Pulaski Light Artillery, engaged in a fierce artillery duel with Captain James Totten, who had only a few months earlier surrendered the Federal Arsenal at Little Rock. Captain Totten found himself with an opportunity to gain revenge, and his cannons roared throughout the day.

The Battle of Wilson's Creek came to an abrupt and inglorious halt when the Union commander was killed. Leaderless and outnumbered five-to-one, the bluecoats fled the battlefield. The Arkansas troops played a major role in winning the battle, but paid a heavy price for victory. Two Arkansas units suffered particularly heavy casualties. Colonel Thomas J. Churchill's 1st Arkansas Mounted Rifles counted 42 killed and 155 wounded out of 600 men. Colonel John Gratiot's 3rd Arkansas Infantry, State Troops suffered 109 casualties, including 25 killed, out of a force of 500 men.

=== Pearce's Troops vote to disband ===
Shortly after the Battle of Wilson's Creek, Pearce's troops were polled as to whether they wanted to be transferred to Confederate command as had been arranged prior to the battle. Brig. Gen. Pearce actively campaigned against joining the Confederate States Army. Sources differ as to how many of these Arkansas state troops agreed to the transfer. It appears that few were willing to continue in either service. Colonel Gratiot's command voted en masse against the transfer, and they were marched back to southwest Arkansas, where they were mustered out of state service on September 19, 1861. By the end of September 1861, all organized state troops had either been transferred to Confederate command or mustered out of state service.

=== Arkansas Confederates transferred east of the river ===
Between July 2 and August 1, 1861, eight regiments were organized by the Military Board. By November 1861 Governor Rector reported that 21 regiments had been raised, a total of 16,000 men, and an additional 6,000 men were soon to be in the ranks.

The Secession Convention and Military Board fears of Arkansas troops being transferred east of the Mississippi quickly became a reality. Brigadier General William J. Hardee led his new brigade of Arkansas Troops on a short uneventful raid into Missouri, and then transferred the command east of the Mississippi to join what would become the Confederate Army of Tennessee. Arkansas soon found itself virtually defenseless. By insisting that all state troops have the right to approve their transfer to Confederate service, state authorities had effectively killed the chance of raising a large unified force in the state. Governor Rector's newspaper charged: "The Confederate government has abandoned Arkansas to her fate."

== Militia operations: Fall 1861 ==
=== Col. Borland calls for militia to defend Northeast Arkansas: November 1861 ===
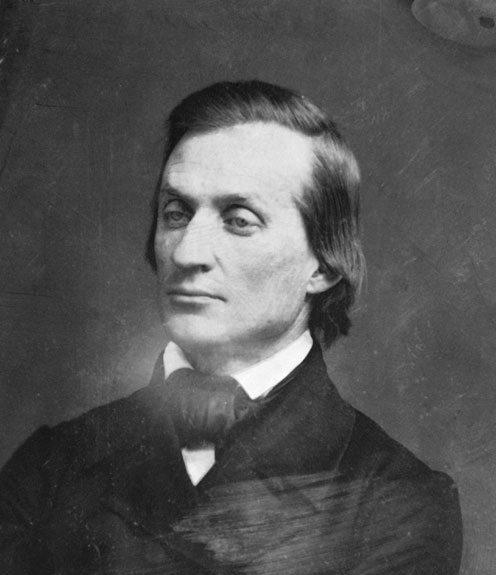
Solon F. Borland served in the Arkansas Regiment of Mounted Volunteers during the Mexican War; He served as the Adjutant General and a United States Senator before the Civil War.

In May 1861, Pocahontas and the nearby strategically important Pitman's Ferry, in Randolph County, became an important Confederate military depot. Following the transfer of the State Troop regiments to Brig. Gen Hardee, virtually all the regiments stationed in northeast Arkansas were transferred in late September east of the Mississippi River to Bowling Green, Kentucky. Col. Solon Borland was left in command of a small force at Pitman's Ferry. Col. Borland's force was the only defense left in Northeast Arkansas. The forces included: Borland's own cavalry regiment of seven companies, Col. McCown's five companies of infantry, Maj. Desha's four companies of raw troops, Capt. Robert's artillery unit of 60 men but no guns and about 150 recruits brought by Maj. McCray – altogether about 1286 men. But of these, owing to sickness and casualties Col Borland said he could count on no more than 600 for fighting service, and all were "raw, inexperienced, poorly disciplined and indifferently armed."

A second round of recruiting for new regiments was just getting underway when Col. Borland began receiving reports of enemy movements in Missouri. The initial reports seemed to indicate a possible movement on Pitman's Ferry. The Union army was massing troops in southeast Missouri mainly for the purpose of a thrust down the Mississippi River. But this posed a very real threat to all areas of northeast Arkansas. Col Borland indicated that he had reliable information "that there are 300 infantry and 150 cavalry at Rives' Station, on Black River, 35 miles north of Pitman's Ferry. Also that there is a strong infantry force-7,000-at Greenville, 15 miles north of Rives' Station." Borland was maintaining a regular correspondence with Brig Gen. M. Jeff Thompson, of the Missouri State Guard, who commanded the First Military District of Missouri at Bloomfield, Missouri.

Reports of these Union troop movements were sent to area militia units. The Jacksonport Herald of October 26, 1861, published a communication received by Christopher W. Board, Commander of the 34th Militia Regiment of Jackson County.

23 Oct.1861

Col. Board

... We have commenced taking steps to call out the militia but will not call them out unless there is certainty a necessity for it. It might be well for your officers to take such steps as will enable prompt action in case of necessity. I send it to you, believing that you can have the proper persons ready for action; and at the same time keep down all unnecessary excitement ... J.C. Marvin.

Col. Borland moved his command from Pitman's Ferry to Pocahontas and was sufficiently alarmed over the reports to issue a call for reinforcements from the militia. On November 5, 1861, Col. Borland issued an appeal for volunteers in the surrounding counties to hastily organize companies for the defense of Pitman's Ferry until new regular Confederate regiments could be organized and dispatched.

When news of Borland's situation reached Little Rock, the state Military Board responded to Borland's call for aid by calling out the 8th Militia Brigade under the command of Brig. Gen. Phillips:

It being represented that the State was in danger of invasion, and that Colonel Borland's command was threatened with immediate attack, it was ordered that Brigadier-General Phillips be ordered to call out the Eighth Brigade of Militia, and that he also order out one company each from the following counties, viz: Prairie, Monroe, Poinsett, Saint Francis, and Craighead.

Brig. Gen. Theodore H. Phillips offered his services to Col. Borland, who welcomed his aid in the emergency. Phillips undertook the organization of the new 30 day volunteer companies into a brigade. He placed a requisition for camp equipment as follows:

Requisition for Camp and Garrison Equipage viz: Four camp kettles. 4 ovens, lids and pot hooks, 4 coffee boilers, 15 tin cups. 25 tin plates. 4 mess Bins, 1 coffee mill, 6 spoons, 8 knives. Requisition for forage for 8 horses, 96 lbs. of corn.

Brig. Gen Phillips added his explanation for the requisition: "In response to Col. Borland's call for militia service for 30 days. We have responded and entered service. [with] Capt. Ruffner." The receipt was dated Pocahontas November 23. 1861, and was signed by "T. H. Phillips, Brig. Gen. 8th Brigade of Arkansas Militia."

Col. Borland's call received an almost immediate response, but he continued to harbor serious misgivings about his situation. On November 10, he wrote to Maj. Gen. Leonidas Polk, C.S.A., commanding the 1st Division Western Department, at Columbus, Kentucky, and told of his call for reinforcements from the militia. He said the response was "somewhat tumultuous." On November 9, 1000 men had arrived unorganized and so ill-supplied with arms that be deemed it best to direct them to return home. They followed this direction and assured Borland that within a week's time he would have at least 3000 men at his command. He told them that companies thus organized and prepared would be received into service for 30 days from the time they reported again to him. Borland added a postscript to this letter, saying that he had just received a report from his scouts that a Federal force of 7450 was between Reeve's Station and Greenville in Missouri. He told Gen. Polk that the force he had was wholly insufficient for either attack or defense. It should be three times as large or be abandoned altogether; and finally he asked to be relieved of his command. "It is a Brigadier's command, and should have his responsibility, which I am daily growing more and more distrustful of my competency to sustain. Public interests here would be better provided for by other and abler hands."

News of Borland's call for volunteers and the resulting convergence upon Pocahontas was of course reported to other parts of the state. The Arkansas True Democrat of November 14 printed a dispatch from Des Arc dated November 9, 11:00 pm:

The steamer Kanawa Valley left Jacksonport this morning and reports here that large numbers of men are flocking to Bor1ands aid. The Federal forces 7,000 strong are advancing on Pocahontas rapidly, and were expected to make an attack on the town to-day. There is a tremendous excitement throughout the country. The women and children are all being moved from Pocahontas and active preparations are making for a stern resistance to the invaders. Borland's command has retreated from Pittman's Ferry to within a mile of Pocahontas, where they have made a stand. This intelligence is perfectly reliable. J.C. Morrill.

Some two dozen of these emergency companies were organized in Greene, Independence, Izard, Jackson, Lawrence and Randolph counties, including the areas now encompassed in present-day Clay, Cleburne, Sharp and Woodruff counties. They converged on Pocahontas and Pitman's Ferry, beginning about November 9, and were mustered into Confederate service for a period of thirty days. Few records of these hastily organized and short-lived companies have survived. It appears that three thirty-day regiments were organized from these companies.

==== 1st Arkansas Regiment, 30 Day Volunteers, CSA ====
The 1st Arkansas Regiment, 30-Day Volunteers (infantry), seems to have been formally organized on November 23, 1861—at least that is the date of the appointments of the field and staff officers—under command of Colonel James Haywood McCaleb. Col. McCaleb was the commander of the 25th Militia Regiment, form Lawrence County. It appears that several of the companies that composed the new "30 Day Volunteer" regiment originated as part of the 25th Militia Regiment:

- Company A – Capt. A. G. Kelsey—Randolph and Lawrence counties.
- Company B – Capt. John W. Peter—Sharp, Independence and Izard counties.
- Company C – Capt. M. Shelby Kennard—Independence county.
- Company D – Capt. Thomas S. Simington—Randolph county.
- Company E – Capt. Joshua Wann—Lawrence (present day Sharp) county.
- Company F – Capt. Israel Milligan—Lawrence (present day Sharp) and Izard counties.
- Company G – Capt. Daniel Yeager—Lawrence (present day Sharp) county.
- Company H – Capt. James Campbell Anderson—Greene (and present day Clay) counties.
- Company I – Capt. Beverly B. Owens—Independence county.
- Company K – Capt. L. W. Robertson—Lawrence (and present day Sharp) counties.

==== 2nd Arkansas Regiment, 30 Day Volunteers, CSA ====
The 2nd Regiment Arkansas Regiment, 30-Day Volunteers (infantry), may not have completed its organization—only the records of one battalion of this regiment have survived. Only the records of the four companies of the 1st Battalion of the 2nd Regiment are extant. Four companies from northeast Arkansas constituted the 1st Battalion. The companies enlisted for 30-days of emergency service on November 18, and were discharged on December 18, 1861:

- Company A – Capt. John H. Miers' company from Jackson County.
- Company B – Capt. W. T. High's company ("High's Repellers") from Prairie (and present-day Lonoke) counties. This company appears to have originated as Company G, 50th Militia Regiment of Prairie County.
- Company C – Capt. James R. Morris' company from Independence and present-day Cleburne counties, and
- Company D – Capt. Thomas G. Shinpock's company from present-day Woodruff County.

The men of Companies A, B and C returned to their respective homes after being discharged. The men of Company D stayed on to enlist in Confederate service for one year and became Company K of McCarver's 14th Arkansas Infantry. No colonel or lieutenant-colonel was ever assigned to the 2nd Regiment. The only field-grade officer mentioned in the record is a Major Allen, commanding the 1st Battalion, 2nd Regiment.

==== 3rd Arkansas Regiment, 30 Day Volunteers, CSA ====
A 3rd Arkansas Regiment, 30-Day Volunteers (cavalry), almost surely never completely organized—only the rosters of two mounted companies, under Captains Reves and Hooker, have survived.

- Capt. Reves' Mounted Company, 30-Day Volunteers, CSA – from Randolph County. Notation on muster roll—"This company was raised in Randolph county, Arkansas, in response to Colonel Borland's call of November 5, 1861, mustered into the Confederate service on December 26, 1861, for 30 days, and discharged on January 26, 1862, at Pocahontas, Arkansas.".
- Capt. Richard Hooker's Company, Arkansas Mounted Volunteers, 30 days 1861, CSA – Jackson County. This company was mustered into Confederate service November 29, and discharged December 28, 1861. Muster rolls for this period bear the remark: "the men were armed with shotguns and borrowed sabers." Hooker's Company began as a cavalry unit. They had evidently spent time training in camp at Jacksonport before going to Pocahontas. In a report of purchases of army equipment at Jacksonport for the military board, R. R. Kellogg wrote on December 20, 1861: "Enclosed please find an Invoice of Goods by the Committee for Jackson County at this place – together with the receipts of all that we have distributed. The tents loaned to Hooker's Company have been returned and are now subject to your order." Although Hooker's Company was originally organized for 30 day service, it was reorganized on February 26, 1862, by Capt. Hooker at Jacksonport and more men were added. It figured prominently in actions around Jackson County in the spring and summer of 1862. Hooker's Company was mustered into it Confederate service as companies C and D of the 32nd Arkansas Infantry Regiment.

==== Unattached companies ====
Four additional companies were raised, possibly to fill out the rest of the 2nd Regiment or possibly for the 3rd Regiment of 30 day Volunteers, but they were never formally assigned to a regiment.

- Capt. Clayton's Company, 30-Day Volunteers, CSA—From Lawrence (Now Sharp) county. Notation on muster roll—"This company was raised at Ash Flat, Arkansas, in response to Colonel Borland's call of November 5, 1861, mustered into the Confederate service on November 9, 1861, for 30 days, and discharged on December 9, 1861, at Pitman's Ferry, Arkansas."
- Capt. Ballard's Company, 30-Day Volunteers, CSA – from Randolph county, Notation on muster roll—"This company was raised in Randolph county, Arkansas, in response to Colonel Borland's call of November 5, 1861, mustered into the Confederate service on November 17, 1861, for 30 days, and discharged on December 17, 1861, at Pitman's Ferry, Arkansas."
- Capt. Baker's Company, 30-Day Volunteers, CSA – from St Francis county. Notation on muster roll—"This company was raised at Cotton Plant, Arkansas, in response to Colonel Borland's call of November 5, 1861, mustered into the Confederate service on November 14, 1861, for 30 days, and discharged on December 14, 1861, at Pocahontas, Arkansas."
- Capt. Ruffner commanded a company of volunteers from the southern part of Lawrence County and evidently camped with Gen. Phillips. They remained at Pocahontas until the emergency was over and Col. Borland felt their service was no longer needed.

The period of enlistment for these emergency companies expired from mid-December to early January, about the time that the new regular regiments arrived, and they were discharged and sent home. Most of the volunteers subsequently enlisted in various regiments organized in the third round of troop mobilization in March and April 1862.

=== Operations against the Peace Society ===
The 45th Regiment Arkansas Militia was the regiment of Searcy and present-day Stone counties. It is the only militia regiment known to have been called up during the war for a specific mission. Confederate and State authorities became increasingly concerned about a shadowy organization in north-central Arkansas known as the Peace Society. The Peace Societies were largely union sympathizers who felt that the large slaveholding planters of southern Arkansas and the deep South had caused the war; they felt that they should be required to bear the burden of the conflict. Governor Rector ordered the 45th Arkansas Militia Regiment (Searcy County) to round up suspected Peace Society members in Searcy and Van Buren counties.

The regiment mustered on November 26, 1861, at Burrowville (now Marshall), and spent the next few weeks identifying and apprehending suspected Peace Society members throughout the mountains of north-central Arkansas. Finally, in mid-December, the regiment "escorted" their prisoners to Little Rock, where most of them were forced into Confederate service. Companies I and K of Marmaduke's 18th Arkansas (later 3rd Confederate) regiment were composed primarily of men rounded up by the 45th Militia. Their mission completed, the regiment returned to Searcy County and mustered out on December 20, 1861. The next spring, most of them enlisted in the 27th and 32nd Arkansas Infantry Regiments.

=== Inspection of militia units December 1861 ===
The Military Board's efforts to mobilize necessary forces to defend the state, while maintaining the Militia as a separate organization, appear to have still been successful in the fall and winter of 1861. In early December 1861, the commanding generals of the Arkansas Militia Brigades made inspection tours of their districts. The Adjutant General, General Edmund Burevin, reviewed the Militia Division of Major General Thomas D. Merrick, who had mobilized as the Colonel of the 10th Arkansas. Major General James Yell reviewed the 2nd Militia Division. Brigadier General Holt, 2nd Brigade, 1st Division, reported that the militia units in the eight counties that comprised the 2nd Brigade were well organized, and that domestic arms were more plentiful than he had expected. Regimental Drill was conducted on December 5, 1861, at St. Johns College in Little Rock, and on December 7 in Saline County.

== Militia operations: 1862 ==
The Confederate Government in Richmond reacted to Arkansas' complaints on January 10, 1862, by creating District of the Trans-Mississippi from General Albert Sidney Johnston's Department of the West and dispatching Major General Earl Van Dorn to assume command. General Van Dorn arrived in Little Rock on January 29, 1862, and immediately made a requisition upon the State Military Board for ten additional regiments of infantry and four companies of artillery. In a proclamation, "To The People Of Arkansas, dated January 31, 1862, Governor Rector commented that:

From the best data in possession of the State authorities it is estimated that Arkansas has now 22,000 men in the Confederate Army, which is equal to 37 per cent, of her population fit or subject to military duty—the 8,500 called for making 30,500 out of 60,000, being one-half, or 50 per cent, of her entire military force

Under the Governor's Proclamation, the state was divided into four new "divisions" and each division was assigned a recruiting goal. Governor Rector warned that any division which failed to report the number of men to them by March 5, 1862, would be subject to a draft, by counties, until their due proportion according to population was furnished ... Rector also stated that the State Military Board had the authority "to make a draft from the militia to obtain the required number for service".

=== Militia called out in the face of invasion ===
Before Major General Van Dorn could make much progress at building his new "Army of the West", a Union invasion of Northwest Arkansas necissitated an activation of the state militia. On February 17, 1862, General McCulloch issued a proclamation from Fayetteville:

To Able-bodied Citizens Of Western Arkansas: The troops under General Price and myself are falling back before a superior force to the Boston Mountains. Thousands of Federal hirelings are within the line of your State, -whilst hundreds of men remain at home, notwithstanding their services are needed. Let every man turn out and form companies, and rally to meet the advancing enemy. Rally at once or it will be too late.

Brigadier General N. B. Burrow, commander of the 3rd Brigade, 1st Division, Arkansas State Militia reacted by activating his entire brigade. According to pay records and muster rolls from the period, the following elements of the 3rd Brigade were activated in the face of the Union invasion of Northwest Arkansas:

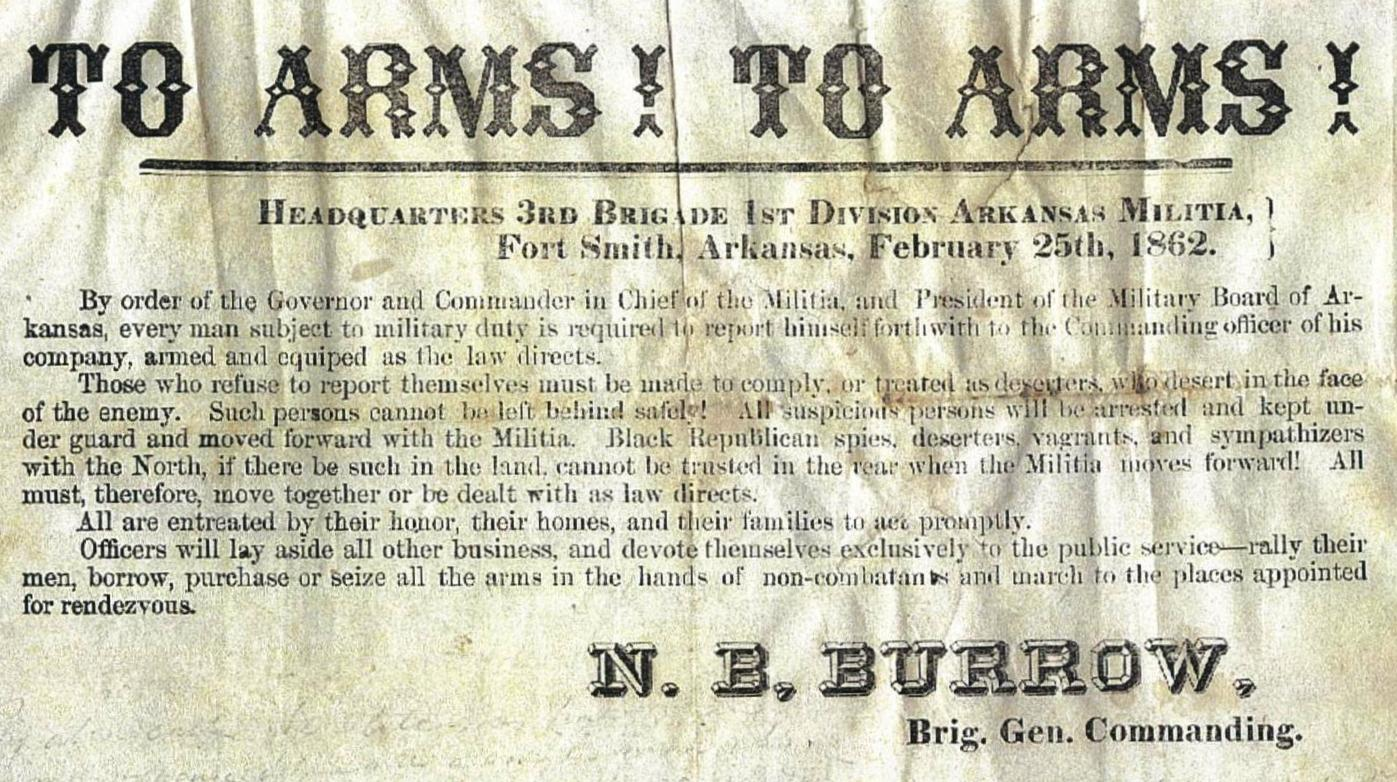

- 5th Militia Regiment, 3rd Militia Brigade, Crawford County, on duty 21 February -17 March,
- 7th Militia Regiment, 3rd Militia Brigade, Franklin County, on duty 22 February -19 March,
- 10th Militia Regiment, 3rd Militia Brigade, Johnson County, on duty 20 February -19 March
- 51st Militia Regiment, 3rd Militia Brigade, Sebastian County, on duty 4 March - 19 March,
- 58th Militia Regiment, 3rd Militia Brigade, Logan County, on duty 22 February - 21 March,
- 62nd Militia Regiment, 3rd Militia Brigade, Johnson County, on duty 22 February - 1 March,

General Van Dorn received dispatches on February 22, from Generals McCullock and Price which indicated that General Price had rapidly fallen back from Springfield Missouri before a superior force of the enemy, and was endeavoring to form a junction with the division of General McCulloch in Boston Mountains, near Fayetteville. The State Military Board issued an order to Brigadier General George M. Holt, Commander of the 2nd Brigade of Arkansas Militia on February 26, to organize and put in camp each regiment in his militia brigade without delay. Brigadier General Burrow of the 3rd Militia Brigade, wrote from his headquarters at Van Buren to Governor Rector on March 2 informing the governor that he feared that only about 1,400 out of the 4,800 men enlisted in the brigade would report for duty. This estimate was based on the first returns from the units he had called out in response to Brigadier General McCulloch's call. Burrow indicated that reasons for this poor showing were that many had responded to General McCulloch's call by simply joining the existing volunteer regiments. Others had gone into hiding in the mountains in order to avoid militia duty. Finally some had joined the quartermaster department as teamsters and runners, and thus became exempt from militia duty, in order to escape combat.

On March 3, General Van Dorn reached the headquarters of Generals Price and McCulloch and on March 7–8 General Van Dorn's Army of the West engaged the Federal Army of the Southwest near Elk Horn Tavern in what would become known as the Battle of Pea Ridge. After initial success on the first day of the battle, Van Dorn was forced to order a retreat due to a lack of ammunition to continue the fight.

In response to the call of the State Military Board, elements of the 2nd Brigade, Arkansas Militia were mustered during and immediately following the Battle of Pea Ridge. The 50th Militia Regiment, of Prairie County, mustered March 7–9 while the 15th Militia Regiment, of Pope County mustered on 10–11 March. These are the only 2nd Brigade units for which pay roll records are available. H.W. Sholar of Greene County wrote to Governor Rector on 13 March, concerning Rector's recent call for 1,500 men to enlist in the militia. Scholar reported that companies were being raised in the county, but he complained that the men who refuse to enlist are threatened with death and "mob law" reigned in the county.

While General Van Dorn was fighting the Federals, Governor Rector was fighting attempts by the state legislature to abolish the militia. The legislature had been called into a special session beginning March 5, but the legislature lacked a quorum until 17 March when they began a 5-day session. Legislators who were tired of the high cost of attempting to maintain a separate state army sought to abolish the militia and passed an act to forbid Governor from paying Militia officers. The legislature did appropriates $575,000 to implement current military law. Governor used a pocket veto to prevent the bill abolishing the militia and the bill forbidding him to pay militia officers from becoming law but signed the appropriation passed by the legislature and used the funds to finance Militia activities.

=== Governor Rector attempts to organize a new State Army ===
Following his defeat at this battle, General Van Dorn initially retreated to Fort Smith and began moving his army back across the state in the direction of Jacksonport. Van Dorn originally intended to attempt an invasion of Missouri from Northeast Arkansas, but before he could begin such an operation, he received orders from General Albert Sydney Johnson directing him to move his army east of the Mississippi to assist with operations near Corinth, Mississippi. Van Dorn left the state with virtually every organized military unit and all the military stores and equipment that he could procure, once again leaving the State of Arkansas virtually defenseless in the face of a continued threat of invasion.

Furious with the authorities in Richmond, Governor Rector threatened to withdraw Arkansas from the Confederacy. Governor Rector issued an address on May 5, 1862, calling for the formation of 30 new infantry companies and 20 new cavalry companies. Rector indicated that if there were insufficient volunteers to fill these new companies, a draft would be made upon the militia regiments and brigades. As a further enticement, Rector also indicated that these regiments were for home defense and that they would not be transferred to Confederate Service without their consent.

=== General Hindman assumes command ===
Arkansas' Confederate congressional delegation joined Governor Rector in demanding defense for Arkansas, President Jefferson Davis in the summer of 1862 created the Trans-Mississippi District, made up of Arkansas, Louisiana, and Texas. Major General E. Kirby Smith was placed in command, with headquarters at Shreveport, Louisiana. Major General Thomas C. Hindman, a resident of Helena and a forceful commander, was named to command the forces in Arkansas in a Special Order issued by General Bragg on May 26, 1862. With Federal troops only 35 miles (56 km) from Little Rock, Hindman was forced to take drastic measures. While on his way to Little Rock he had "impressed" $1 million from Memphis banks. At Helena he raided the stores, confiscating supplies ranging from medicine to ammunition, all of which he loaded on impressed steamboats. Of doubtful legality, these actions continued once Hindman reached Arkansas. Professor Michael Dougan has written that Hindman took "stores of all kinds" from citizens, even going so far as to raid the State Library to obtain paper for making cartridges. Finally, he burned thousands of bales of cotton to prevent their falling into enemy hands.

Broadside announcing the militia muster of the 1st and 2nd Battalions of the Arkansas County Militia for the purpose of enrolling conscripts in Confederate Army, June 1862

Reaching Little Rock on May 30, 1862, General Hindman wasted no time in trying to correct the complicated situation in Arkansas. The general at once began to raise a new army. Facing the immediate threat of Federal occupation, General Hindman insisted that the State Military Board transfer all remaining state troops to Confederate service. Rector, having won the battle with Richmond and facing staggering costs in maintaining a state army, was in no position to refuse. On June 2, 1862, Rector issued a proclamation noting that it was "essential that but one military organization shall exist within the Trans-Mississippi Department" and transferred all state forces to Confederate command.

Relying upon a recently adopted Confederate conscription law, General Hindman drafted large numbers of men. To encourage volunteering, Hindman announced that if men formed themselves into volunteer companies by June 20, 1862, they would be permitted to elect their own company officers, instead of their officers being appointed by General Hindman. It is possible that this led to the aforementioned large number or enlistments from former militiamen into Volunteer Regiments in the summer of 1862.

During the spring and summer, many former militiamen joined one of the newly formed volunteer regiments. It may be that the militiamen decided it was better to enlist and remain together than to wait for forced conscription under new Confederate Conscription laws, which were being strictly enforced during the summer of 1862. In some cases, the Militia was ordered to assemble at their Regular Battalion Muster Grounds for the purpose of enrolling conscripts for service the Confederate Army. In many cases, names on the militia muster rolls from the February–March call up of the militia match subsequent enlistments in new Volunteer Regiments being raised in the spring and summer of 1862. A good example of this process is Company A of the 6th Arkansas Cavalry Regiment which was enlisted at Hickory Plains, Prairie County, Arkansas, on May 9, 1862, by Captain Patrick Henry Wheat. Of the 97 members of this company who enlisted at Hickory Plains, 49 were present for the muster of the 50th Militia Regiment on March 7, 1862.

Regiment	County	Final Muster Date	Confederate Unit of Enlistment
5th Regiment Arkansas Militia	Crawford County	February 21 to March 17, 1862	unknown
7th Regiment Arkansas Militia	Franklin County	February and March 1862	Co. I, 34th Arkansas Infantry Regiment, CSA also several enlisted in Union units
10th Regiment Arkansas Militia	Johnson County	February 20 to March 19, 1862	Company H, 26th Arkansas Infantry Regiment, Company D, 4th Arkansas Cavalry Regiment, Company I, 34th Arkansas Infantry Regiment, and Company B, 7th Arkansas Cavalry Regiment
15th Regiment Arkansas Militia	Pope County	March 10–11, 1862	Williamson's Arkansas Infantry Battalion, Companies C, D, and E, 35th Arkansas Infantry Regiment
21st Regiment Arkansas Militia	White County	March 7–9, 1862	Companies A, B and E of the 36th Arkansas Infantry Regiment, CSA
45th Regiment Arkansas Militia	Searcy County	December 20, 1861	Company F, 27th Arkansas Infantry Regiment and Company F, 32nd Arkansas Infantry Regiments, CSA
50th Regiment Arkansas Militia	Prairie County	March 7, 1862	Company A, 6th (Monroe's) Arkansas Cavalry, and 2nd Arkansas 30-Day Volunteers
51st Regiment Arkansas Militia	Sebastian County	March 4–14, 1862	Unknown
58th Regiment Arkansas Militia	Franklin County	February 22 to March 21, 1862	35th Arkansas Infantry Regiment, CSA (Many also enlisted in Union Regiments)
62nd Regiment Arkansas Militia	Johnson County	February 22, 1862, to March 1, 1862	a small number enlisted in either the 34th Arkansas Infantry Regiment or the 4th Arkansas Cavalry Regiment many joined Union Regiments raised in the area.

=== Home guard ===
Besides attempting to organize a strong force of regular Confederate troops, General Hindman used the conscription laws to create home guard units. The Confederate conscription statutes required that from 1864, boys of 17 years and men between 45 and 50 serve as a state defense reserve. On June 17, 1862, Hindman issued General Order Number Seventeen, providing that "for the more effectual annoyance of the enemy ... all citizens of this district, who are not subject to conscription, are called upon to organize themselves into independent companies." In the thoroughness that typified Hindman, he suggested the types of operations which the home guards should carry out: "Their duty will be to cut off Federal pickets, scouts, foraging parties, and trains, and to kill pilots and others on gun-boats and transports, attacking them day and night, and using the greatest vigor in their movements." Although the home guard units were similar to the militia, the Federals accused Hindman of legalizing bushwhacking. Many of the men who joined the home guards merely used the organization as an excuse to pillage isolated farms and villages. Northwest Arkansas, in particular, suffered at the hands of these guerilla bands.

The home guards proved to be popular with Confederate sympathizers in Arkansas, primarily because these units could not be sent out of the state without the consent of state authorities. While some of these groups did engage in informal guerrilla activities, others were well-organized and competently commanded. The Home Guard units continued to operate until the closing days of the war.

=== The fall of Little Rock ===
General Hindman proved a more effective organizer than a battlefield leader. His new army met defeat first at the Battle of Prairie Grove (December 7, 1962) and later at the Battle of Helena in July 1863. The state capitol, Little Rock, fell to advancing Union Forces on September 10, 1863. Arkansas Confederate forces continued to resist until the end of the war, and managed to inflict a few embarrassing Union defeats, notably at Battle of Jenkins' Ferry and Battle of Marks' Mills during the Red River Campaign of 1864. Many of the units which participated in these final battles of the conflict in Arkansas were raised as State Troops from the militia of southern Arkansas.

== Militia operations after the fall of Little Rock ==
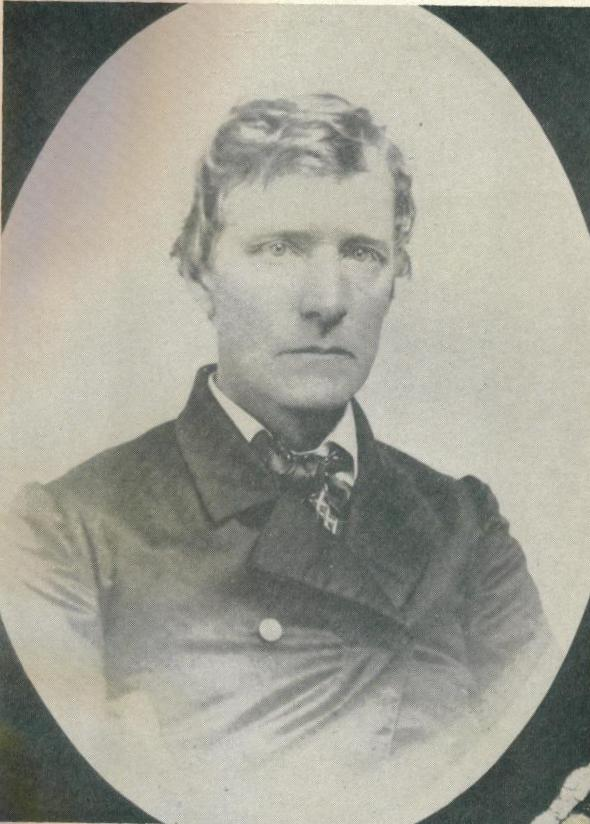
Gordon Neill Peay served as Adjutant General to Governor Flanagin, 1863-1865

Governor Harris Flanagin (who had defeated Governor Rector in his re-election bid of 1862) began organizing a new force of state troops in the fall of 1863. Governor Flanagin appointed Gordon N. Peay to serve as his Adjutant General. Peay would serve in this capacity until the end of the war. Flanagin issued a proclamation on August 10, 1863, just a month before the capitol fell, announcing that he had been authorized to raise new regiments of state troops and that by special agreement these new units could not be transferred out of the state by Confederate authorities. After the fall of Little Rock, recruiting was far more difficult than it had been in the first years of the war. The constant transfer of Arkansas troops into the eastern theater of the war, across the Mississippi River from their homes, was a major objection by the remaining population of men eligible for military service. With Federal forces now occupying the state capitol, the Confederate state government had no way of enforcing conscription laws in the counties behind the Union lines, except during raids by Generals Price and Shelby in 1864. The remaining Confederate regiments were plagued by desertions.

On September 16, 1863, in the immediate aftermath of the fall of the state capitol, Governor Flanagin issued General Order No. 6 from Arkadelphia, which called into service the militia regiments of the counties of Clark, Hempstead, Sevier, Pike, Polk, Montgomery, La Fayette, Ouachita, Union, and Columbia in order to resist the Federal army. The Governor's order directed the regiments to march to Arkadelphia at the earliest possible day. Companies were to be mounted and commanders were to compel persons evading the call to come to the rendezvous. The intent was to form companies of twelve-month mounted volunteers. Only six physicians, one druggist, millers to supply the wants of the country, clerks, sheriffs, postmasters, and persons in the employ of the Confederate States were exempted from the order. In describing this call in a letter to General Holmes dated October 18, 1863, from Washington, Arkansas, the new Confederate state capitol, Flanagin stated that he issued the order calling out the militia, as an experiment, expecting to get volunteers. The order succeeded so well as to get companies organized in the counties where the call for the militia was enforced which resulted in seven companies being collected under the call. Flanagin also stated that "the troops raised by the State are more than double all the troops raised by volunteering, or by the conscript law, within the past few months".

On October 26, 1863, Governor Flanagin directed Adjutant General Peay to:

visit Lewisville, in La Fayette County, and see Captain Ford, who has been raising a company of mounted riflemen under the State. I have been informed that this company has been sworn into the service of the Confederate States. If so, the only thing to be done is to communicate this fact to General Fagan. If the State troops which can be raised in La Fayette County are already raised you are authorized to disband the militia. If convenient, I would like for you to go to Union County. Captain Holloway has been raising a company of mounted riflemen in that county. If his company is organized, you can disband the militia of that county. If the colonel is inefficient, and Captain Holloway has not got his company formed, let him swear his men in and get the militia together, and compel those who are liable to the conscript law to go into the State or C. S. service.

These new units of Arkansas State Troops were placed under the overall command of Col. William H. Trader who was detailed to Governor Flanagin by General E. Kirby Smith. Col. Trader remained in command of the state troops until he resigned in June 1864.

=== Pettus Battalion, Arkansas State Troops ===
On January 14, 1864, Governor Flanagin, through General Peay, issued General Orders, No. 8. which directed the following named companies of Arkansas mounted volunteers, which had been called into the service of the State under the proclamation of the August 10, A.D. 1863, compose and be designated as the 1st Battalion, Arkansas State Troops:

- Company A, of Hempstead County, Captain E. K. Williamson, commanding.
- Company B, of Clark County, Captain Reuben C. Reed, commanding.
- Company C, of Sevier County, Captain Allen T. Pettus, commanding.
- Company D, of Polk County, Captain G. A. Hale, commanding.
- Company E, of Hot Spring County, Captain John W. Dyer, commanding.

Allen T. Pettus was elected Lieutenant Colonel of this battalion. The unit participated in the battle of Marks Mill on April 25, 1864, as a part of Brigadier General William L. Cabell's Division. Lt. Col. Pettus was killed during the battle and Capt. P.K. Williamson of Company A commanded the battalion until the unit was increased to a regiment and transferred to Confederate service.

=== Newton's 10th Arkansas Cavalry Regiment ===
In August 1864 when the term of enlistment for these state troops was about to expire, Adjutant General Peay issued an order which directed that companies be allowed to vote on the subject of being transferred into Confederate service. However, the chance to vote on being transferred was merely a matter of form because Peay's order also had directions for those who refused transfer to Confederate service:

Men whose terms of service have expired, and who are not willing to be transferred, will be reported to and turned over to the proper enrolling officer of the Confederate States for conscription. Men whose terms of service have not expired and who are opposed to the transfer will be required to serve until the expiration of their term of enlistment, and such as do not then re enlist will be turned over to the proper enrolling officers of the Confederate States for conscription.

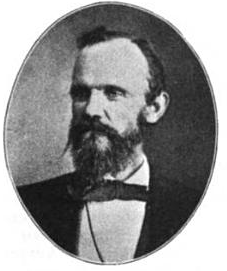
Robert C Newton, first commander of the Pulaski Light Artillery. Later commanded the 5th Arkansas Cavalry Regiment.

On September 5, 1864, the State Troop companies, including Pettus Battalion, were formed into one regiment of cavalry to be designated as the 3rd Regiment of Arkansas Cavalry, with Col. Robert C. Newton assigned to the command of the regiment until an election could be held for field officers. The companies of this regiment included:

- Company A—Capt. Reuben C. Reed, composed of men from Clark County
- Company B—Capt. Robert S. Burke, composed of men from Montgomery County
- Company C—Capt. Cyrus K. Holman (replaced Allen T. Pettus), composed of men from Sever County
- Company D—Capt. James B. Williamson, composed of men from Polk County
- Company E—Capt. Samuel Ogden (replaced P.K. Williamson), composed of men from Hempstead County
- Company F—Capt. Theophilus G. Henley, composed of men from Hempstead County
- Company G—Capt. George A. Hale, composed of men from Polk County
- Company H—Capt. William C. Corcoran, composed of men from Scott County
- Company I—Capt. Allen A. McDonald (replaced John W. Dyer), composed of men from Hot Spring County
- Company K—Capt. John Connally, composed of men from Pope County.

This unit was mustered into the Confederate Service on the October 31, 1864 as the 10th Arkansas Cavalry Regiment. Col. Newton was elected Regimental Commander. The unit operated in the Arkansas River Valley, interdicting the supply route between Little Rock and Fort Smith during the winter of 1864 to 1865.

== The new unionist militia ==
In September 1863 Little Rock was captured by Union forces, and the Confederate state government fled to Washington, a town in Southwest Arkansas. From that point, effective Confederate control was limited to the southwest corner of the state. Home guard units and guerrilla bands continued to mount frequent raids. The Union government acted quickly to establish a loyal government in Little Rock.

That new loyal government was led by Isaac Murphy. Murphy had gained fame, and no small degree of hatred, by his firm refusal to vote for secession during the state secession convention. In early 1864 a convention was held in Little Rock to draft a unionist state constitution. On March 14 the document was approved by the available voters; Isaac Murphy was shortly thereafter elected governor.

Among Murphy's first acts was to call for the formation of a loyal state militia, as bushwhackers were running rampant in the state. On May 31, 1864, the legislature adopted Act Number Nineteen, which provided for the creation of "a loyal State militia." This legislation stipulated that "none but loyal and trustworthy men shall be permitted to bear arms in said organization." So that the legal militia could be easily separated from the guerrilla forces, the act required each militiaman to "wear, as a mark of distinction, and for the purpose of being recognized at a distance, a band of red cloth [three] inches in width, to be worn on their hats, or in the most conspicouns [sic] manner ..." Governor Murphy was authorized by the legislature to solicit 10,000 stands of arms from the Federal authorities to supply the militia force. Albert W. Bishop, a lieutenant colonel in the 1st Arkansas (Union) Cavalry, became Murphy's adjutant general.

Using United States Army officers to oversee recruitment, the new militia slowly took shape. Recruitment was most effective in strong unionist areas, especially northwest Arkansas, and in areas where a large Federal garrison could provide assistance. By the end of September 1864 militia drills were being held at Little Rock and Fort Smith as well as other points. In Little Rock, authorities ordered businesses to close during the three-hour weekly drills to encourage full attendance.

The rural areas of Northwest Arkansas, which experienced continual depredations by guerrilla forces, witnessed the formation of paramilitary organizations akin to, but different from, the Militia. Portions of the area had been stripped of productive farms, given the roaming bands of bushwhackers and Federal troops who frequently impressed food and supplies. Thus, a large percentage of the population faced starvation. As early as 1863, well before the formation of the Murphy government in Little Rock, Colonel M. LaRue Harrison, a Unionist commander and the man after whom the city of Harrison would be named, formed what came to be known as "Farm Colonies". These colonies would serve both a military and agricultural purpose. The colonies organized Militia companies composed entirely of farmers, which would be expected to cultivate the land and protect it.

== Connection to the Arkansas National Guard ==
Current Arkansas Army National Guard units do not trace their lineage and honors to any of the units that participated in the Civil War. This is due in part to the lack of organization and poor record-keeping at the state level both before and after the war, and in part due to confusion over identification of units. In contrast to other southern states whose current National Guard units are awarded the campaign participate credits for their unit's participation in the various campaigns and engagements while in Confederate service, no current Arkansas National Guard unit has Campaign Participation Credit for the period of the Civil War.

== See also ==
- Arkansas in the American Civil War
- List of Arkansas Civil War Confederate units
- List of Arkansas Union Civil War units
