= 3rd Arkansas Cavalry Regiment (Confederate) =

Third Arkansas Cavalry Regiment
- Active: 1861–1865
- Disbanded: May 1, 1865
- Country: Confederate States
- Branch: Confederate States Army
- Type: Cavalry
- Size: Regiment
- Facings: Yellow
- Engagements: American Civil War: Corinth Campaign; Battle of Corinth; Battle of Holly Springs; Battle of Thompson's Station; Battle of Franklin; Tullahoma Campaign; Battle of Chickamauga; Siege of Chattanooga; Siege of Knoxville; Atlanta campaign; Siege of Atlanta; Battle of Flat Shoals; Battle of Strawberry Plains; Battle of Brown's Mill; Battle of Thompson's Station; Savannah Campaign; Carolinas campaign

Commanders
- Notable commanders: Colonel Solon Borland; Colonel Samuel G. Earle; Colonel Anson W. Hobson

The 3d Arkansas Cavalry Regiment (1861–1865) was a Confederate Army Cavalry regiment during the American Civil War.

At the outbreak of hostilities between the north and south, Arkansas began raising troops to serve in the Confederate Army. The state raised some 48 infantry regiments, along with several cavalry regiments and artillery batteries. The 3rd Arkansas Cavalry was first organized in Little Rock, Arkansas on June 10, 1861, by former senator and soldier Solon Borland. Borland, who was at the time serving as a state militia commander for Northern Arkansas, was initially named a Colonel of the regiment. However, that post was "elected" by the members of the regiment, and Borland was not reelected in May 1861.

On July 27, 1861, the regiment was mustered into the Confederate Army for one years service which they later extended, and sent to Corinth, Mississippi, but without Borland. Borland by this time had been replaced by Colonel Samuel G. Earle. The regiment was placed under the command of Major General Joseph Wheeler, and later became a part of the Army of Mississippi. They saw their first real battle action on October 3 and 4, 1862 at the Second Battle of Corinth, where Lieutenant Colonel Anson W. Hobson was wounded in both arms, with the regiment as a whole suffering heavy casualties. The very next day, on October 5, 1862, they fought in the Battle of Hatchie's Bridge. They saw considerable combat action in the months that followed. On March 5, 1863, Col. Earle was killed in action near Thompson's Station, Tennessee.

He was replaced by newly promoted Col. Anson W. Hobson. The regiment took part in the Knoxville Campaign, the Atlanta campaign, and fought at the Battle of Bentonville. They surrendered with the Army of Tennessee on April 26, 1865.

== Organization ==
The 3d Arkansas Cavalry Regiment was organized June 10, 1861, as the 1st (Borland's) Arkansas Cavalry Battalion. Mustered into state service as the 1st Arkansas Mounted Volunteer Regiment. Mustered into Confederate Service for one year on July 29, 1862. Redesignated as the 3d Arkansas Cavalry on January 15, 1862. Received the attachment of Companies E,F, and H of Williamson's Arkansas Infantry Battalion. Reorganized for two years on May 26, 1862. For a time it was stationed at Pocahontas, Arkansas, where at least some of the men were recruited. The field officers were Colonels Solon Borland, Samuel G. Earle, and Amson W. Hobson; Lieutenant Colonels Benjamin F. Danley, James M. Gee, and M. J. Henderson; and Majors William H. Blackwell, J. F. Earle, and David F. Shall. The unit was formed from the following Volunteer companies:

- Company A — Dallas County (Princeton Light Horse).
- Company B — Perry County (Perry Rangers).
- Company C — Saline County (Saline Rifle Rangers).
- Company D — Pulaski County (Danley’s Rangers).
- 1st Company E — Pope County (transferred from Williamson's Arkansas Infantry Battalion, May 26, 1862).
- 2nd Company E — "Border Rangers" of White County and "Crittenden Rangers" of Crittenden County (transferred from 2nd Arkansas Cavalry Regiment, January 1, 1863).
- Company F — Hot Spring County (Hot Springs Cavalry).
- Company G — Ouachita County (Ouachita Cavalry).
- Company H — Ouachita County (Camden Cavalry).
- Company I — Conway County (transferred from Williamson's Arkansas Infantry Battalion, May 26, 1862).
- Company K — Yell County (transferred from Williamson's Arkansas Infantry Battalion, May 26, 1862).

The regiment was armed with weapons which the state confiscated by Arkansas State Militia troops.

== Battles ==
When the 3d Arkansas Cavalry was transferred from Arkansas to Mississippi in 1862, only 395 effectives crossed the Mississippi River. The regiment was dismounted when it fought at the Battle of Corinth, Mississippi, then was remounted and assigned to General Armstrong's and T. Harrison's Brigade. The 3d Arkansas Cavalry served under Major-General “Fighting Joe” Wheeler in the Confederate Army of Mississippi for much of the war. The unit was involved in the following engagements:

Siege of Corinth (also known as the "First Battle of Corinth"), April to June 1862.
Second Battle of Corinth, Mississippi, October 3–4, 1862.
Battle of Holly Springs, December 20, 1862.
Battle of Thompson's Station, March 5, 1863.
Battle of Franklin, April 20, 1863.
Tullahoma Campaign, June 1863.
Battle of Chickamauga, Georgia, September 19–20, 1863.
Siege of Chattanooga, Tennessee, September–November 1863.
Siege of Knoxville, Tennessee, November 1863.
Atlanta campaign, May to September 1864.
Siege of Atlanta, Georgia, July 22, 1864.
Battle of Flat Shoals, Georgia, July 28, 1864.
Battle of Strawberry Plains, Georgia, August 24, 1864.
Battle of Brown's Mill, Georgia, July 30, 1864.
Savannah Campaign, Georgia, November–December, 1864.
Carolinas campaign, February to April 1865.

== Surrender ==
The 3d Arkansas Cavalry surrendered with the Army of Tennessee at Durham Station, Orange County, North Carolina, April 26, 1865.

== See also ==
- List of Confederate units from Arkansas
- Confederate Units by State

== Bibliography ==
Collier, Calvin L. The War Child's Children: The Story of the Third Regiment, Arkansas Cavalry; Confederate States Army. (Little Rock, AR: Pioneer Press, 1965).
