= 4th Regiment, Arkansas State Troops =

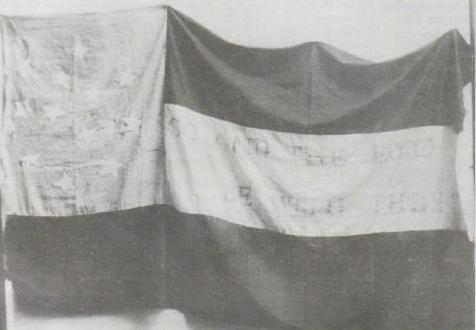
- National color of the Fourth Arkansas
- Active: 1861
- Disbanded: August 1861
- Country: Confederate States
- Allegiance: Arkansas
- Branch: Army
- Engagements: American Civil War: Battle of Wilson's Creek

The 4th Infantry, Arkansas State Troops (1861) was an Arkansas State infantry regiment that served during the American Civil War. After being raised in mid-1861, the regiment was assigned to the command of Brigadier General Nicholas Bartlett Pearce, who was the commander of the 1st Division, Provisional Army of Arkansas. The regiment is referred to as the "4th Regiment Arkansas Volunteers", or "Walker's Regiment" in contemporary accounts; it was disbanded shortly after the Battle of Wilson's Creek in August 1861. Another Arkansas unit also had the designation 4th Arkansas, the 4th Arkansas Infantry Regiment which formed after the Battle of Wilson's Creek, and spent most of its service in the Confederate Army of Tennessee. There is no connection between the two units.

== Organization ==
At the beginning of the war, the Arkansas Succession Convention created the Provisional Army of Arkansas. The Provisional Army was to consist of two divisions, the 1st Division in the western part of the state was to be commanded by Brigadier General Pearce, and the 2nd Division in the eastern half of the state, commanded by Major General James Yell. The intent of the Secession Convention was to transfer these state troop regiments into Confederate service as quickly as possible, to avoid the cost of paying for a large state army. The troops of the eastern division were transferred to the command of Brigadier General Hardee in July 1861, but the troops of the western division under Brigadier General Pearce were not transferred to Confederate service before they became engaged in the Battle of Wilson's Creek. The unit was composed of the following volunteer companies:

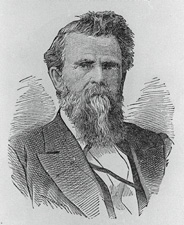
Colonel James David Walker, 4th Regiment, Arkansas State Troops

Company A, of Sebastian County, commanded by Captain Patrick H. Sanders.
Company B, of Madison County, commanded by Captain Larkin Bunch.
Company C, of Washington County, commanded by Captain Hugh L. Tinnen.
Company D, the Fort Smith Grays, of Sebastian County, commanded by Captain Cabell.
Company E, of Crawford County, commanded by John T. Humphreys.
Company F, of Washington County commanded by Captain Thomas Montague Gunter.
Company G, of uncertain county commanded by Captain J. W. Johnson.
Company H, the Jo. Wright Guards, of Carroll County commanded by Capt. Hampton B. Fancher.
Company I, of Carroll County, commanded by Captain John Denny.
Company K, of Carroll County, commanded by Captain James Midleton Pittman.

The regimental officers were:

Walker, James D., Colonel
Berry, Tom, Lieutenant Colonel
Peel, S.W., Major
Dunlap, A., Surgeon
Morrow, J.M., Assistant Surgeon

== Battles ==
The 1st Division (Brigade) Arkansas State Troops, along with Brigadier-General Ben McCulloch's Confederate brigade, marched north into Missouri, where they linked up with Major General Sterling Price's Missouri State Guard. The combined force then moved towards Springfield, Missouri. Under the command of Colonel James D. Walker, the 4th Regiment, Arkansas State Troops was present at the Battle of Wilson's Creek, Missouri, on August 10, 1861, but was not engaged. On the morning of August 10, 1861, while encamped along Wilson's Creek, just south of Springfield, Missouri, the Southern army was attacked by a Union force under Brigadier General Nathaniel Lyon. The ensuing battle was one of the largest and most desperately fought engagements in the western theater.

Report of Col. J. D. Walker, Fourth Arkansas Infantry.

IN CAMP ON WILSON'S CREEK, MO., August 11, 1861.

The Fourth Regiment, on the morning of the 10th, was placed under the command of Adjutant-Gen. Rector, who remained in command during the day. This regiment was not brought into immediate action, being stationed upon the hill for the protection of Reid's battery, and although exposed to danger from the fire of the enemy, all the officers and men of the regiment behaved with the greatest promptness and coolness in all their movements during the day. There were none killed or wounded in the Fourth Regt.

I have the honor to be, respectfully, &c.,

J. D. WALKER,

Col. Fourth Regt. Arkansas Volunteers.

Brig.-Gen. PEARCE.

== Disbanded ==
Following the battle, the regiment, with the rest of the Arkansas troops, was marched back to Arkansas and given the opportunity to vote on the issue of being transferred into Confederate service. The regiment, along with the rest of the 1st Division voted to disband rather than be transferred to Confederate service. Many veterans of the regiments joined other Confederate units later in the war.

== Flag ==
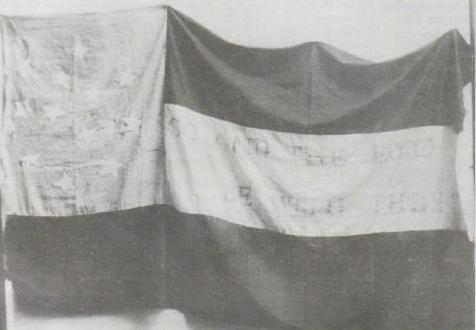
Flag of the Joe Wright Guards, which later became the colors of the 16th Arkansas Infantry Regiment

Many of the original companies raised for the war received handmade flags which were presented to them in elaborate ceremonies in their hometown before marching off to war. In the first year of the war, many of these homemade banners were "1st National Flag" pattern, meaning that they were patterned after the first national flag authorized for the new Confederate Government. The new Confederate Banner, often referred to as the "Stars and Bars", consisted of "a red field, with a white space extending horizontally through the center, equal in width to one third the width of the flag, and red spaces above and below to the same width as the white, the union blue extending blue extending down through the white space and stopping in the lower red space, in the center of the union, a circle of white stars corresponding in number with the States of the Confederacy." The white stripe was a convenient place for the flag makers to embellish the flag with some motto or inscription.

One of these "1st National" pattern flags was given to the Joe Wright Guards, which became Company H, 4th Regiment, Arkansas State Troops. The flag was made by Ms. Josephine Wright and Ms. Jane Bailey. The flag is 36" by 72" and has the words GO AND THE LORD BE WITH THEE" painted on the white stripe. The flag was alleged chosen for the colors of the 4th Regiment. After the 4th Regiment was disbanded, many of the former members of the Joe Wright Guards joined Company D, of the new 16th Arkansas Infantry Regiment, and according to the Memoirs of Captain J. B. Bailey, the flag was chosen as the regimental colors of the 16th. The flag was carried by the 16th Arkansas during the Battle of Iuka and the Battle of Hatchie's Bridge during the Iuka-Corinth Campaign. The flag was retired when the 16th Arkansas was issued a new Van Dorn Pattern Battle Flag. The 16th Arkansas was captured during the Siege of Port Hudson, but the old set of colors was smuggled out and returned to the family of Ms. Wright. The flag remained in the family until 1981, when it was donated to the Atlanta Civil War Museum, but current location of the flag is unknown.

== See also ==
- List of Confederate units from Arkansas
- Confederate Units by State
