= 14th Arkansas Infantry Regiment (McCarver's) =

- Active: 1861–1865
- Disbanded: May 26, 1865
- Country: Confederate States
- Allegiance: Arkansas
- Branch: Army
- Type: Infantry
- Size: Regiment
- Engagements: American Civil War: Bombardment of Fort Pillow

The 14th (McCarver's) Arkansas Infantry (1861–1865) was a Confederate Army infantry regiment during the American Civil War. Almost as soon as the regiment was formed, it was divided into two separate units. The first five companies were organized into the 9th Arkansas Infantry Battalion, while the remainder of the companies would become the 18th Arkansas Infantry Battalion. The 9th Arkansas Infantry Battalion was later merged with the 8th Arkansas Infantry and served for the rest of the war as part of that regiment, While the 18th Arkansas Infantry Battalion was consolidated with the remnants of the 17th Arkansas Infantry Regiment (Lemoyne's); the combined unit was then designated the 21st Arkansas Infantry Regiment (Craven's). A tenth company was added in December, 1862. The companies were from Izard, Lawrence, and Randolph counties.

The 17th Arkansas Regiment took part in the 1863 Vicksburg campaign, and was surrendered as part of the garrison. The 17th Arkansas was paroled, and after its eventual exchange was reorganized and consolidated with the remnants of several other Arkansas Regiments, known thereafter as the 1st Consolidated Arkansas Infantry (Trans-Mississippi). Another Arkansas regiment also bore the number 14. It was originally commanded by William C. Mitchell, but is best known as Powers' 14th Arkansas Infantry Regiment.

== Organization ==
McCarver's 14th Arkansas Regiment has been described as the regiment that barely was, since it existed only briefly as a full regiment. The first eight companies were mustered into service between August 31 and September 23, and the Field and Staff Officers were appointed on September 23, 1861, at Pocahontas, Arkansas. October 22, 1861, is recognized as the date of the organization of the regiment because that's when the ninth company joined the unit, and the company muster rolls were submitted to the Confederate War Department along with official notification of the organization of the regiment, (initially designated by Colonel Solon Borland as the 9th Arkansas). Stationed in the same area were the 1st, 2nd, 5th, 6th, 7th and 8th Arkansas Regiments, which led Col. Solon Borland, commanding Post of Pocahontas, to muster Col. James H. McCarver's new regiment into service as the 9th Arkansas Infantry Regiment. This would have been logical, except for the fact that a 9th Arkansas Infantry Regiment had already been authorized by the State Military Board and mustered into service at Pine Bluff on July 25, 1861, Colonel John M. Bradley commanding. When Colonel Borland sent the muster-in rolls to the Confederate War Department, he was informed that McCarver's regiment would instead be designated as the 14th Arkansas Regiment.

It is unclear why the Confederate War Department assigned this designation to McCarver's regiment. Correspondence exists between Arkansas Governor Henry Rector and Confederate Secretary of War Walker, in which Mitchell's regiment is clearly identified as the 14th Arkansas. In a letter dated August 22, 1861, Governor Rector wrote, "The Fourteenth Regiment of Arkansas is at Yellville. We understand that General Hardee does not wish to receive it." So the War Department was clearly informed of the existence of a 14th Arkansas Regiment; yet they still assigned that designation to McCarver's regiment four months later. The unit was originally composed of volunteer companies from the following counties:

- Company A – The "Izard Volunteers" – Commanded by Captain Lindsey S. Williams, organized at Pocahontas, Arkansas, on September 1, 1861.
- Company B – Commanded by Captain Thomas N. Smith, organized at Pocahontas, Arkansas, on September 24, 1861.
- Company C – Commanded by Captain Enoch O. Wolf.
- Company D – Commanded by Captain Christopher C. Elkins, organized in Izard Co, Arkansas, on August 27, 1861.
- Company E – Commanded by Captain Hugh A. Barnett, organized at Pocahontas, Arkansas, on September 23, 1861.
- Company F – Commanded by Captain William G. Matheney, organized at Pocahontas, Arkansas, on September 23, 1861.
- Company G – Commanded by Captain Samuel J. Herndon, organized at Pocahontas, Arkansas, on August 31, 1861.
- Company H – Commanded by Captain, organized at Pocahontas, Arkansas, on September 23, 1861.
- Company I – Commanded by Captain Adison H. Nunn, organized at Pocahontas, Arkansas, on October 24, 1861.
- Company K – Commanded by Captain Thomas G. Shinpock, organized at Pitman's Ferry, Arkansas, on December 18, 1861. Prior to being assigned to the 14th, this company had served as Company D, 1st Battalion, 2nd Arkansas 30 Day Volunteer Regiment. The company had originally been organized as a volunteer company in the 25th Regiment, Arkansas State Militia, from Lawrence (Modern Woodruff) County.

McCarver's regiment had barely received its designation when it was placed in danger of losing it. Brigadier General William J. Hardee made a decision to detach four of the regiment's best armed and equipped companies (Companies A, B, E & H) and designate them as the 9th Arkansas Infantry Battalion, and place them under the command of Major John H. Kelly. It was Brigadier General Hardee's intention was to take all of the organized Arkansas troops with him when transferred his command to Kentucky in September 1861 except for Colonel Borland's own regiment. However Hardee did not wish to accept poorly armed and untrained troops. It appears that there were sufficient arms to equip four of McCarver's companies, so these companies were detached from the regiment as a separate battalion and departed with General Hardee, with the balance of the regiment to follow when they were properly armed and equipped. Clearly, McCarver considered the detachment of those companies to be temporary, because when the official notice of organization was sent to the Confederate War Department, he assigned the detached companies designations (Cos. A-B-E-H) and noted that they were detached with General Hardee. This arrangement caused some confusion at Richmond, which wrote back to Borland, "Does Col. J. S. McCarver's command consist of only five companies, or a full regiment? If less than a regiment, it will be known as the Eighth Battalion; if ten companies, the Fourteenth Regiment Arkansas Volunteers. Please inform the Department at your earliest convenience the exact state and condition of his command. Maj. F. W. Desha's command will be known as the Seventh Battalion Arkansas Volunteers." McCarver certainly considered that he had a full regiment (the tenth company had arrived on December 18), because as late as February 1862 he was signing correspondence as "colonel commanding 14th Arkansas Regiment."

The balance of McCarver's regiment never joined Hardee because Borland, commanding post, was in a state of panic over reports that a large Union force was planning to attack Pocahontas. Borland stopped further troops movements to Kentucky, including Robert's Arkansas Battery which was intended for Hardee, and sent out a frantic call for emergency volunteers. Over two dozen of these poorly armed thirty-day companies converged on Pocahontas for an attack that never came. Borland's call resulted in the formation of the 1st and 2nd Arkansas 30 Day Volunteer Regiments.

The Compiled Service Records of Confederate Soldiers Who Served in Organizations from the State of Arkansas quartermaster receipts from October and November 1861 show the remaining companies of McCarver's command furiously requisitioning large amounts of supplies and camp equipment. There was similar activity with the ordnance department, requisitioning arms and ammunition, which indicates that McCarver intended to equip the balance of his command sufficiently armed and equipped to join Hardee. However, McCarver's command remained in Arkansas. McCarver eventually replaced Col Borland and the commander of troop in northeast Arkansas, and McCarver's detached companies became a separate command, Kelly's 9th Arkansas Infantry Battalion

== Battles ==
General Hardee took the 9th Arkansas Battalion with him when he transferred his command to Kentucky and organized the Confederate Army of Central Kentucky. When Hardee's command was attached to forces under Confederate General Albert Sidney Johnston, The 9th Arkansas Infantry Battalion, under the command of Major Kelly was assigned to Brigadier General S.A.M. Wood's brigade of Hardee's Corps, of the Army of Mississippi and participated in the Battle of Shiloh, Tennessee, on April 6, 1862.

The detachment of Kelly's Battalion left McCarver with half a regiment. The War Department notified Colonel Borland that unless the 14th Arkansas was assigned its requisite ten companies, it would henceforth be known as the 8th Battalion Arkansas Infantry (though that designation was later assigned to Lieutenant Colonel Batt L. Jones' battalion). The remnants of the regiment spent much of the winter of 1861-1862 encamped near Pitman's Ferry, Arkansas, where several soldiers died of measles. The unit responded to several alarms associated with the anticipated invasion of Northeast Arkansas by Union Force following the Battle of Pea Ridge. By late March 1862, Colonel McCarver was in command of an organization dubbed the "White River forces" which in addition to the remnants of his own regiment, included, the 3rd Arkansas Cavalry Regiment, Lemoyne's 17th Arkansas Infantry, a temporary battalion under the command of Captain Turnbull, and artillery battery and at least two companies of Missouri troops totalling 1599 troops.

In the wake of the defeat at the Battle of Pea Ridge, the Army of the West was undergoing a comprehensive reorganization, and units were assigned and reassigned on virtually a daily basis. The White River forces at Pocahontas including the Arkansas infantry commands of McCarver, Lemoyne and Turnbull were involved in a confusing array of assignments and reassignments, primarily within the brigades of Brigadier General Albert Rust and Brigadier General Thomas Churchill. It appears that McCarver's regiment was intended to be assigned to Churchill's brigade.

As with most of the other active units in Arkansas, the remainder of McCarver's regiment was ordered to Corinth, Mississippi, in April 1862. The unit marched from Pittman's Ferry on April 1, 1862, and reached Jacksonport on April 5. Special Order Number 47, Army of the West, directed Colonel McCarver's regiment of Arkansas Infantry to transfer at once to the steamer General Price and sail for Memphis, Tennessee. Upon reaching Memphis, McCraven and Colonel Lemoyne were to report to Brigaider General Rust. The unit boarded the steamer and moved down White River, out at its mouth, then up the great Mississippi and landed at Memphis, Tennessee, on April 9. At Memphis the regiment was met by some of the wounded from Shiloh, including men from the Kelly's 9th Arkansas Infantry Battalion, who provided news of the battle of Shiloh.

The regiment marched through Memphis to the Memphis & Charleston depot to board trains for Corinth. Before the train departed, the regiment was ordered to march back, board a steamer, and move further up the Mississippi River and was landed at Fort Pillow, 50 miles (80 km) above Memphis, on the Tennessee side. It was here that the men of McCarver's command saw their first enemy fire. It was described by Private Elihu C. Bechkam many years after the war.

Just before landing, as I was standing on the hurricane deck, I saw something that looked like a gigantic lightning bug flying with incredible speed through the heavy timber of the river bottom. I could not tell how far away the thing was, neither did I know what it was, but you may bet that before the ten days were out that we remained there I knew what it was. Just as the thing got opposite our boat, it flashed, then was gone, but about that time we heard a report that told us that it was one of Uncle Sam's "baby wakers," which was the first bomb shell I had ever seen.

The unit remained at Fort Pillow for ten days. The unit continued to experience bombardment during its stay at Fort Pillow, but only one man was killed. Many of the soldiers were sick, and several died due to the very muddy conditions and poor water supply at the fort. The unit left Fort Pillow on the April 19, with a fleet of Confederate gunboats and moved to nearby Fort Randolph the same day.

On April 21, 1862, General Van Dorn issued Special Order Number 59, from Memphis which announced the organization of the 1st and 2nd Brigades of the 2nd Division of the Army of the West. McCarver's regiment is listed as part of Brigadier General Churchill's 2nd Brigade. On the April 22, morning report of Churchill's brigade, McCarver's regiment is listed as being on detached service. Then on April 24, Special Order Number 64, Army of the West, from Memphis, directed that Col McCarver's regiment of Arkansas Volunteers be transferred from Churchill's to Rust's Brigade. General Rust's brigade was to be composed of Colonel Carroll's 18th Arkansas, King's 22nd Arkansas, Smead's 19th Arkansas, McCarver's 14th Arkansas and Lemoyne's 17th Arkansas and a yet to be named artillery battery.

The 14th Arkansas remained at Fort Randolph until April 24 when it again moved by steamer to Memphis and from there to Corinth, Mississippi, on April 25. The unit camped about 2 miles (3.2 km) southeast of Corinth, where the unit was reorganized. There are few official records of the unit between January and April 1862. At Corinth, McCarver's command is listed in a return of troops in the Army of the West, dated at Corinth, Mississippi, May 4, 1862, as the 18th Battalion Arkansas Infantry, with 198 of 275 men present for duty. It is unclear how that designation came about. On the same return is listed Lemoyne's 17th Battalion Arkansas Infantry, with 387 of 627 men present for duty.

In early May 1862, Confederate forces underwent an army-wide reorganization due to the passage of the Conscription Act by the Confederate Congress in April 1862. All twelve-month regiments had to re-muster and enlist for two additional years or the duration of the war; a new election of officers was ordered; and men who were exempted from service by age or other reasons under the Conscription Act were allowed to take a discharge and go home. Officers who did not choose to stand for re-election were also offered a discharge. The reorganization was accomplished among all the Arkansas regiments in and around Corinth, Mississippi, following the Battle of Shiloh.

On May 15, 1862, McCarver's 14th and 17th Arkansas Infantry Regiment (Lemoyne's)s, (or 17th and 18th Arkansas Battalions), were consolidated to form the 21st Arkansas Infantry Regiment. Col McCarver was not re-elected in the reorganization of the regiment and was discharged. Jordan E. Cravens was elected colonel of the new unit. The units new designation as the 21st Arkansas caused some initial confusion because the designation "21st Arkansas" had already been assigned to the regiment of Colonel Dandridge McRae. To avoid confusion between two 21st Arkansas Regiments, McRae's regiment was later redesignated as the 15th (Northwest) Arkansas Infantry Regiment (making a total of three 15th Arkansas Regiments).

As the 21st Arkansas Regiment, under Col. Jordan E. Cravens, this regiment fought in the following engagements: Second Battle of Corinth, Battle of Grand Gulf, Battle of Port Gibson, Battle of Champion's Hill, Battle of Big Black River Bridge, and finally was surrendered with at the end of the Siege of Vicksburg. The 21st Arkansas was consolidated with the 15th Northwest Arkansas, 16th Arkansas, and Powers' 14th Arkansas Infantry Regiments to form the 1st Arkansas Consolidated Infantry Regiment (Trans-Mississippi), and was stationed at Marshall, Texas, when the war ended. The consolidated regiment was assigned along with the 2nd Arkansas Consolidated Infantry Regiment and the 3rd Arkansas Consolidated Infantry Regiment and to the 2nd (McNair's) Arkansas Brigade, 1st (Churchill's) Arkansas Division, 2nd Corps, Trans-Mississippi Department, from September 1864 to May 1865.

== Surrender ==
The 1st Arkansas Consolidated Infantry Regiment was formerly surrendered with the Department of the Trans-Mississippi by Major General E. Kirby Smith on May 26, 1865. When the Trans-Mississippi Department surrendered, all of the Arkansas infantry regiments were encamped in and around Marshall, Texas (since war-ravaged Arkansas was no longer able to sustain the army). The regiments were ordered to report to Shreveport, Louisiana, to be paroled. None of them did so. Some soldiers went to Shreveport on their own to be paroled, but the regiments simply disbanded without formally surrendering. A company or two managed to keep together until they got home. For example, Company G, 35th Arkansas Infantry Regiment, traveled back to Van Buren, Arkansas, where they surrendered to the U.S. post commander in a formal ceremony, drawn up in front of the court-house, laying down their weapons, etc. But for the most part, the men simply went home. Many of the Arkansas Cavalry units, which had largely been furloughed for the winter of 1864-1865 following Price's disastrous Missouri Expedition did formally surrender at Jacksonport, Wittsburg, and a few other locations.

== See also ==
- List of Confederate units from Arkansas
- Confederate Units by State
