= 19th Arkansas Infantry Regiment (Dockery's) =

- Active: 1862–1865
- Disbanded: May 26, 1865
- Country: Confederate States
- Allegiance: Arkansas
- Branch: Army
- Type: Infantry
- Size: Regiment
- Facings: Light blue
- Battles: American Civil War; Battle of Farmington; Battle of Iuka; Battle of Corinth; Battle of Hatchie Bridge; Battle of Port Gibson; Battle of Champion's Hill; Battle of Big Black River Bridge; Siege of Vicksburg (POW); Battle of Mount Elba; Battle of Prairie D'Ane; Battle of Marks' Mills; Battle of Jenkins Ferry
- Battle honors: Farmington; Iuka; Corinth; Hatchie Bridge

Commanders
- Notable commanders: Col. Thomas P. Dockery

The 19th Arkansas Infantry Regiment or Dockery's regiment was an infantry formation of the Confederate States Army during the American Civil War. There were two other regiments which were designated as the 19th Arkansas. Dawson's 19th Arkansas Infantry was organized at Nashville, Arkansas, on November 21, 1861. Hardy's Arkansas Infantry, which is also occasionally referred to as the 19th Arkansas was organized in 1863 from those parts of Dawson's 19th Infantry Regiment, the 24th Arkansas Infantry Regiment and Crawford's Arkansas Infantry Battalion, which escaped capture at the Battle of Arkansas Post.

== Formation ==
The 19th Arkansas Infantry Regiment was organized on April 2, 1862, at DeValls Bluff, with Col. Hamilton P. Smead in command. The regimental quartermaster was Capt. Thomas P. Dockery, future brigadier-general. The regiment comprised ten companies from Columbia, Hot Spring, Lafayette, Ouachita and Union counties. The unit was composed of volunteer companies from the following counties:

- Company A – commanded by Captain James G. Johnson, and organized in Lewisville, Lafayette County, Arkansas on February 25, 1862;
- Company B – commanded by Captain Dave Dixon and organized in Columbia County, Arkansas on February 26, 1862;
- Company C – commanded by Captain Wiley H. Buffington and organized in Columbia County, Arkansas on February 27, 1862;
- Company D/E – the "Mountain Minute Men" – commanded by Captain R. S. Clayton and organized as a volunteer company in the 47th Regiment, Arkansas State Militia, Hot Springs County, Arkansas on December 25, 1861. The unit was sworn in to Confederate service on March 1, 1862;
- Company F – commanded by Captain W. C. Langford, and organized at El Dorado, Arkansas on March 1, 1862;
- Company G – commanded by Captain John A. Meek, and organized in Union County, Arkansas on March 1, 1862;
- Company H – commanded by Captain John Cook, and organized at Caney, Arkansas on March 3, 1862;
- Company I – commanded by Captain B. R. Mathews, and organized in Union County, Arkansas on March 3, 1862; and
- Company K – commanded by Captain H. K. Perry, and organized in Columbia County, Arkansas on March 8, 1862.

The original Regimental officers were:

- SMEAD, H.P. – Colonel
- DISMUKES, WILLIAM H. – Lieutenant Colonel
- WILLIAMS, H.G.P. – Major
- DOCKERY, THOMAS P. Captain – Commissary
- FELTON, ROBERT A. – Surgeon
- PEARCE, GEORGE W. – Assistant Surgeon
- DURHAM, F.M. – Surgeon Major
- MOHR, DAVID – Quartermaster Sargent
- EDENBO, WILLIAM H. – Musician
- TATUM, ORGAN Ordnance Sargent

== American Civil War ==
Soon after being organized, the regiment was ordered to Mississippi, along with the rest of Van Dorn's Army of the West. The unit boarded a steamer and moved down White River, out at its mouth, then up the Mississippi River and landed at Memphis, Tennessee. The Confederate commander at Memphis reported on April 7 that Colonel Smead's command with a total of 762 soldiers (of which 560 were fit for duty) was present but armed with double barrel shotguns and inferior rifles. The unit was assigned to the Brigadier General Albert Rust's brigade. The regiment was immediately ordered to move via paddle steamer to Fort Pillow, approximately 50 miles (80 km) north of Memphis, along with the remainder of Rust's Brigade. At Fort Pillow, during a bombardment by Union gunboats, the regiment saw their first enemy fire.

The unit remained at Fort Pillow for about two weeks. The unit experienced few casualties in the bombardment of Fort Pillow, but many of the soldiers became sick, and several died due to the very muddy conditions and poor water supply at the fort. The unit left Fort Pillow on April 26 moved back to Memphis and then on to Camp Churchill Clark, near Corinth, Mississippi.

In early May 1862 the Confederate Army underwent an army-wide reorganization due to the passage of the Conscription Act by the Confederate Congress in April 1862. All twelve-month regiments had to re-muster and enlist for two additional years or the duration of the war; a new election of officers was ordered; and men who were exempted from service by age or other reasons under the Conscription Act were allowed to take a discharge and go home. Officers who did not choose to stand for re-election were also offered a discharge. The reorganization was accomplished among all the Arkansas regiments in and around Corinth, Mississippi, following the Battle of Shiloh. After settling in at Camp Churchill Clark, near Corinth, Mississippi, the 19th Arkansas was reorganized for the war and new officers were elected. All of the original field officers were thrown out in the election of May 12, 1862, and in their place the men elected Colonel Thomas P. Dockery, Lieutenant Colonel William H. Dismukes, and Major Horatio G. P. Williams. On June 2, 1862, the two Hot Spring County companies were consolidated. Company D (from Rockport) was merged into Company E (from Hot Springs).

=== Iuka-Corinth Campaign ===
During the Iuka-Corinth Campaign, the 19th Arkansas was assigned to Brigadier General William L. Cabell's brigade of Brigadier General Dabney H. Maury's Division of Major General Sterling Price's 1st Corps the Confederate (Army of the West). The unit participated in the Battle of Corinth and the Battle of Hatchie's Bridge, and reported 129 casualties.

=== Vicksburg Campaign ===
The regiment was assigned to Brigadier General Martin E. Green's brigade of Major General John S. Bowen's Division, of Lieutenant General John C. Pemberton's Army of Mississippi for the Vicksburg Campaign. When General Green was killed on June 27, 1863, Colonel Dockery was placed in command of Second Brigade, Bowen's Division, and so actual field command of the 19th Arkansas Regiment devolved upon Lieutenant-Colonel Dismukes, who led the regiment through the terrible battles that preceded the Siege of Vicksburg. The 19th Arkansas fought at Battle of Port Gibson, Battle of Champion's Hill, and the Battle of Big Black River Bridge, where Lieutenant-Colonel Dismukes was mortally wounded and most of the regiment was captured. Major Horatio Gates Perry Williamson was promoted to lieutenant-colonel after Dismukes' death, and the uncaptured remnant of the 19th Arkansas fell back to Vicksburg, where it endured the forty-day siege.

=== Paroled, exchanged and re-organized ===
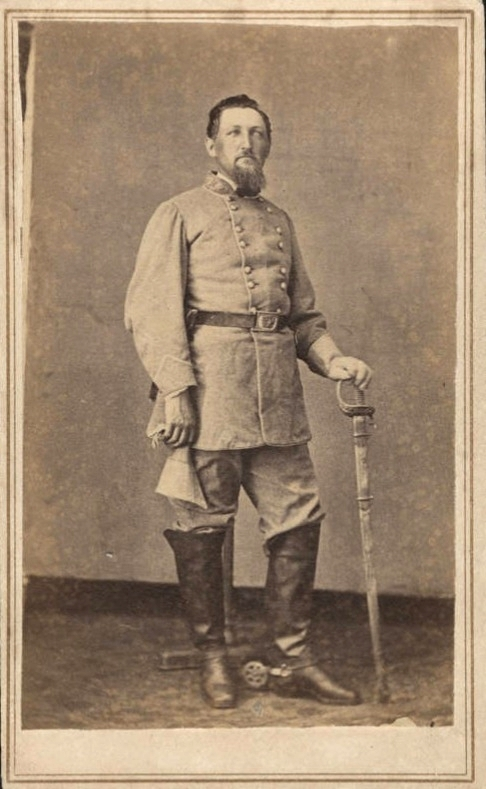
Dockery in uniform, c. 1864

This regiment surrendered with the Army of Mississippi at Vicksburg, Mississippi, July 4, 1863. General U. S. Grant initially demanded the unconditional surrender of the Vicksburg garrison, but faced with the necessity of feeding 30,000 starving Confederates and having the idea that these soldiers might do more harm to the Confederate cause by being released to return home rather than being exchanged as whole units, he relented and allowed for the immediate parole of the surrendered units. According to the Confederate War Department, Union leaders encouraged the surrendered confederates to simply return home, rather than reporting to parole camps to await their eventual exchange. The able bodied Confederate soldiers who were released on parole walked out of Vicksburg (they were not allowed to proceed in any military formations) on July 11, 1863. Paroling of these able bodied men was completed in their respective regimental camps inside Vicksburg prior to July 11. Those who were wounded or sick in the various hospitals in Vicksburg were paroled, and were released as soon as they could leave on their own. July 15/16 is the most common date of these Vicksburg hospital paroles. Some of the most seriously wounded and sick were sent by steamship down the Mississippi River and over to Mobile, Alabama, where they were delivered on parole to Confederate authorities.

Confederate commanders designated Enterprise, Mississippi as the rendezvous point (parole camp) for the Vicksburg parolees to report to after they got clear of the last Federal control point at Big Black Bridge. By August 3, 1864 it was apparent that most of the Arkansas units had bypassed the established parole camps, and with the assistance of their Union captors, simply crossed the river and returned home. On August 3, 1863 it was reported that only a very small number of the paroled Arkansas troops had reported to parole camps east of the Mississippi River.

On August 8, 1863, General Pemberton, wrote to Adjutant General and Inspector General of the Confederate Army, Brigadier General Samuel Cooper to report that the troops from Trans-Mississippi Department (including Arkansas) had abandoned the Army of Mississippi before permission was obtained to furlough them. The troops were ordered to rendezvous at Camden, Arkansas. General Pemberton also requested to send Arkansas troops paroled at after the surrender of Port Hudson to that Camden as well. Because so many of the Vicksburg parolees, especially from Arkansas, simply went home, Major General Pemberton requested Confederate President Davis to grant the men a thirty furlough beginning on July 21. Soldiers who did not report to the parole camp with in the time limits of the furlough were not punished as deserters as long as the soldier eventually showed up at a parole camp to be declared exchanged and returned to duty.

On August 9, 1863, Confederate Secretary of War James A. Seddon wrote to General Kirby Smith, Commanding the Department of the Trans-Mississippi, informing him that Colonel T. P. Dockery of the 19th Arkansas had been ordered to cross the Mississippi River and reassemble the men of his former brigade at Camden Arkansas. Dockery was to arm, recruit, and return to active service the men of his brigade as quickly as they were exchanged. Seddon opined that prisoners who, with the connivance and instigation of the enemy, left Vicksburg before being properly accounted for by their officers, were not properly listed a prisoners, and therefore were free to re-enter service immediately. Seddon also indicated that it might be advisable to distribute these men to other commands rather than keeping them together, but he left that matter up to General Smith. Seddon's letter included Colonel Dockery's commission as a Brigadier General. On August 10, 1863, Colonel Dockery received the following orders from the Confederate Secretary of War:

You will reassemble the scattered and furloughed troops which have passed west of the Mississippi, of the brigade recently commanded by you at the surrender of Vicksburg, at Camden, in Arkansas, or such other point as may be designated by General Smith. On such reassembling, you will take command and proceed to organize and equip them as soon and as perfectly as may be practicable. You will discriminate between such as before the final departure from Vicksburg were, by the act or with the complicity of the enemy, contrary to the terms of the capitulation, transferred to the west bank of the Mississippi, and those who afterward by straggling or after furlough returned to that side, and return lists as early as possible of the two classes, both to the general commanding the Trans-Mississippi Department, and to the Adjutant and Inspector General here. The first class will, with the approval of the commanding general, be regarded as discharged from all obligations of parole, and free for immediate service. Of the exchange or discharge of the others, you will be informed as soon as it can be effected. When reconstituted, you will, under the instruction of the general commanding, and in conformity with the regulations existing, or which may be prescribed for the execution of the conscript law, endeavor to recruit and refill the numbers of your brigade. It is desirable that these troops, or their equivalent, should, as opportunity will allow, be returned from the west to the east side of the Mississippi ...

General Kirby Smith acknowledged the receipt of Seddon's letter on September 11, 1863. General Smith reported that he did not expect that Dockery would have as much success as might be hoped for in reassembling his brigade. General Smith indicated that he lack sufficient weapons to arm Dockery's reconstituted brigade and the military situation in Arkansas would likely prevent Dockery and his men from being returned to duty east of the Mississippi river as Seddon had hoped. The exchange declaration reports issued by Colonel Robert Ould in Richmond for various units in the Vicksburg and Port Hudson surrenders began in September 1863 based upon men who actually reported into one of the two parole camps. On October 16, 1863, the Confederate Exchange Agent, R. O. Ould declared the staff of Colonel Dockery, captured at Vicksburg on July 4, 1863 to be duly exchanged.

When Colonel Dockery was appointed brigadier-general, Lieutenant-Colonel Williamson was promoted to colonel and placed in command of the 19th Arkansas. On December 5, 1863, General Kirby Smith wrote to Lieutenant General Holmes, commanding the District of Arkansas that he was expecting the arrival of 1,200 weapons which were to be sent to Dockery's brigade. Smith indicated that Dockery's Brigade was to be returned to service as Infantry (as opposed to mounted).

On December 5, 1863, General Kirby Smith ordered Brigadier General Dockery, to "quietly, but promptly, draw in and prepare for the field all the men of your command." General Smith indicated that Dockery would be supplied with arms and they Dockery's Brigade would serve as infantry, even if some of Dockery's men had been mounted. By December 23, 1863, General Smith was still attempting to secure weapons for General Dockery's men. General smith ordered General Dockery with "900 unarmed men" to move to Monroe, LA on or before 1 January 1864 to receive weapons from Brigadier General Alfred Mouton.

In January 1864, the Chief Paymaster of the Trans-Mississippi wrote to the Departments Inspector General to report that he lacked sufficient funds on hand to pay the paroled and exchanged prisoners from Vicksburg and Port Hudson assembling at Washington Arkansas under General Dockery. On February 27, 1864 Confederate General Richard Taylor reported to Major General W.R. Boggs, Chief of Staff to General Kirby Smith, that during the month of January 1864, "1,400 stand of arms were crossed (over the Mississippi River) and distributed among General Dockery's unarmed brigade." By March 1864, Dockery's Brigade, consisting of remnants the now paroled and exchanged Arkansas regiments from Vicksburg and Port Hudson, was stationed near Monticello, in Drew County, Arkansas. General Fagan was with Dockery's Brigade assisting in the organization, but near the end of the month withdrew, leaving Brigadier General Dockery in command of his Brigade and Crawford's Brigade. Many of the regiments were mere skeletons, with companies numbering fewer than ten men each, so many consolidations were made with in Dockery's Command. The heavy loss of men sustained by the 19th Arkansas and Johnson's 15th Arkansas, which was surrendered at Port Hudson made it necessary to consolidate these two regiments. But because their enviable records each regiment was permitted to retain its number; and the new regiment was known as the Consolidated 15th and 19th Arkansas Regiment. The regimental officers of the 15th Arkansas had been carried away to Union prison camps in the surrender and not exchanged so Captain Joe, who had managed to escape from Union custody, as senior remaining captain, took command of the remnant of the 15th Arkansas, and Colonel Williams of the 19th was placed in command of the Consolidated Regiment. A portion of the brigade was mounted, and General Dockery took command of this part; and Colonel Williams commanded the infantry portion of the brigade. This left the infantry portion of the 15th and 19th under the command of Captain Joe until the 23rd of May, 1864, when he resigned upon a surgeon's certificate, because of wounds received at Port Hudson. This left Lieutenant Dock in command of Company B in the Consolidated Regiment.

General Dockery had mounted a portion of his brigade, ostensibly to help facilitate the re-assembly of the brigade. This action caused friction with Confederate leadership. The Confederate Army had at this point far more mounted commands that was necessary and the logistical requirements to support such a large mounted force far exceeded the ability of the Arkansas country side to support. By late March, Dockery had a portion of his brigade mounted and a regimental size portion of the brigade under the command of Colonel Williams dismounted as infantry. Dockery's Brigade consisted of the following elements: The mounted portion under Colonel Dockery consisted of:

18th Mounted Arkansas Infantry Regiment
19th and 15th Consolidated Mounted Infantry Regiment
20th Arkansas Mounted Infantry Regiment (Jones)
12th Arkansas Mounted Infantry Battalion (Sharpshooters)

The infantry portion of Dockery's brigade was a regimental size (approximately 400 man) organization and was commanded by Lieut. Col. Horatio G. P. Williams. This organization is occasionally referred to as the 19th Arkansas Infantry, but was actually composed of dismounted company size elements of:

15th Arkansas Infantry Regiment, under Capt. Austin K. Etris
18th Mounted Arkansas Infantry Regiment, under Maj. Samuel H. Southerland
19th Arkansas Infantry Regiment (Dockery's), under Capt. Thomas M. Drewery
12th Arkansas Infantry Battalion, under First Lieut. James A. Gillespie

The remnants of the following Arkansas regiments were also assigned to Dockery's brigade, but in numbers below company strength and the exact manner in which they were consolidated with the mounted and infantry portions of the brigade is unknown:

8th Arkansas Infantry Battalion
12th Arkansas Infantry Regiment
14th Arkansas Infantry Regiment (Powers'),
16th Arkansas Infantry Regiment
21st Arkansas Infantry Regiment (Craven's), and the
23rd Arkansas Infantry Regiment

=== Campden Expedition ===
After being exchanged and reorganized the regiment, along with the rest of Dockery's Brigade, saw extensive action during the Camden Expedition at the Battles of Prairie D'Ane, Marks' Mills, and Jenkins Ferry.

==== The Expedition to Mount Elba ====
The 1864 Camden Expedition was part of a two-pronged strategy by the Union Army to drive Confederate resistance out of southwestern Arkansas and northern Louisiana, and to penetrate into Confederate Texas. Union Major General Frederick Steele led a Union force from Little Rock on March 23, 1864, with the objective of joining forces with Major General Nathaniel Prentice Banks at Shreveport, Louisiana. Confederate forces in Arkansas were directed from Washington, where the Confederate government of the state relocated after the fall of Little Rock.

In support of General Steele's movements toward Arkadelphia, Arkansas, Union Colonel Powell Clayton, stationed at Pine Bluff, decided to conduct an attack Colonel Dockery's forces at Monticello. Clayton had received information that Dockery was about to leave Monticello to oppose Steele's movement. The expedition to Mount Elba began on March 27, 1864 when the Powell's forces under left Pine Bluff. Colonel Clayton's force consisted of elements of Eighteenth Illinois Infantry, Twenty-eighth Wisconsin Infantry, Fifth Kansas Cavalry, First Indiana Cavalry, Seventh Missouri Cavalry (US), totaling approximately 237 men.

Major General Sterling Price, the commander of the Confederate district of Arkansas, had ordered General Dockery to harass the rear flanks of the Union troop movements and attack Union supply trains. General Dockery's forces consisted of his own brigade and elements of Colonel Crawford's Arkansas Cavalry Brigade, including Poe's and McMurtrey's Cavalry Battalions. "Unfortunately," Price reported, "before Brigadier-General Dockery could execute this order he was on March 29 attacked at Mount Elba by a party of the enemy from Pine Bluff and completely routed. They at the same time captured at Long View his entire train (twenty-six wagons) and about 200 prisoners." "Col. Clayton, commanding the expedition from Pine Bluff, destroyed the pontoon bridge at Longview—burned a train of thirty-five wagons loaded with camp and garrison equipage, ammunition, quartermaster's stores, etc., and captured over three hundred prisoners ... .He engaged Dockery's division, of about 1200 men, from Monticello, on the morning of the 30th ult., routed and pursued him ten miles, with a loss on his side of over one hundred killed and wounded—capturing a large quantity of small arms and two stands of colors. Our loss did not exceed fifteen in killed, wounded and missing ... .Three hundred horses and mules and many wagons were captured. Col. Clayton by this expedition has added fresh laurels to his brow. He is worthy of all honor, and deserving the highest reward at the hands of the government. He has been in every instance successful and will be promoted to the rank of Brigadier General for valiant service to the Union cause. He justly deserves the honor."

==== Battle of Prairie D'Ane ====
Confederate Major General Sterling Price ordered Brigadier General John S. Marmaduke to harry the Union column and to prevent it from crossing the Little Missouri River as it moved toward Washington. Advance Union forces clashed with Confederate defenders in the Battle of Elkin's Ferry on April 3. The outnumbered Confederates were forced to withdraw, and General Marmaduke established a defensive position, lightly fortified by earthworks, on the road between Elkin's Ferry and Washington at the western edge of the sparsely populated Prairie d'Ane, a roughly circular area of prairie surrounded by woodlands.

After waiting for the arrival of reinforcements, General Steele advanced on April 9, but was stopped in the Battle of Prairie D'Ane, a series of encounters that ended on April 12. General Dockery's Brigade assisted Marmaduke's division in Prairie D'Ane, April 9–12. After making a feint in the direction of the Confederate state capital at Washington, Arkansas, Steele then turned and occupied Camden, on April 15, in order to resupply his army, which was then on half-rations. Price had stripped Camden of personnel in order to defend Washington, and the Union forces occupied the city against no significant opposition.

==== Battle of Poison Spring ====
After a two-day wait, General Steele sent out foraging parties into the countryside and awaited news from Banks. However, Banks was in retreat, having been defeated at the Battle of Mansfield, and now more of Kirby Smith's forces were heading into Arkansas to intercept Steele. Dwindling supplies for his army at Camden forced Steele to send out a 1,200-man foraging party to gather corn that the Confederates had stored about twenty miles away. After loading the corn into over 200 wagons and proceeding about five miles on April 18, Col. James M. Williams's party was savagely attacked by John Marmaduke's division, assisted by the 19th Arkansas as part of Dockery's Brigade at the Battle of Poison Spring. Williams was forced to retreat northward into a marsh, where his men finally regrouped and fell back to Camden, minus the wagonloads of much-needed corn.

==== Battle of Jenkins Ferry ====
Steele was relieved on April 20 when a wagon train arrived from Pine Bluff with welcome supplies. One week later, the Battle of Marks' Mills resulted in the capture of 2,000 more of Steele's men and many more wagons. Steele decided to abandon Camden under the cover of darkness and retreated to back toward Little Rock on April 26. Three days later, he reached the Saline River at Jenkins' Ferry and began constructing a pontoon bridge. Smith's Confederates arrived on April 30 and repeatedly attacked the retreating Federals in windy and rainy conditions.

Colonel H. G. P. WILLIAMS, of the 19th Arkansas, led his "dismounted casuals" of Dockery's Brigade on the left of Churchill's Division during the battle and filed the following report of his operations:

I carried into action nearly 400 men, divided into four small detachments, commanded respectively by Capt.'s Drewry and Etris, Maj. Southerland, and Lieut. Gillespie, composing the infantry portion of Brig.-Gen. Dockery's brigade. Being temporarily detached from your division, I was ordered by Gen. Smith to cross a large creek or bayou, and moved rapidly down it on the left until I engaged the enemy. I had moved about 1,000 yards when my skirmishers engaged those of the enemy, and my line continuing to advance, the engagement soon became general. After a severe contest of about thirty minutes I succeeded in driving him before me until he entirely disappeared in the under-brush. We again advanced slowly and cautiously, with desultory firing, until the engagement again became general, and lasting for about one hour, with very heavy musketry on each side; but again he was driven back and his fire virtually silenced. At this stage of the battle I was ordered by a staff officer of Gen. Smith to withdraw my forces and recross the creek where I first entered the bottom. I fought with some advantages, my command being in the brush and thick timber, while the heaviest body of the enemy occupied the left corner of an open field across the creek, upon whom my fire was principally directed ... ... I cannot refrain from noticing the action of Lieut. Gillespie, Twelfth Battalion Sharpshooters, commanding detachment, on the field. For activity and daring he was particularly conspicuous, and I would respectfully urge that promotion could not be bestowed upon a more worthy or efficient officer. Capt. Franklin, First Battalion Dismounted Cavalry, commanding a company, deserves the highest praise for his conduct. ... My loss was 1 killed, 14 wounded, and 1 missing

Colonel Steele repulsed the Confederate attacks and finally crossed with what was left of his force, destroying the bridge to prevent Smith from following. He was compelled to abandon most of his remaining supply wagons in the swamp north of the river. A badly chagrined Steele finally reached his base at the Little Rock Arsenal on May 3.

On May 8, 1864, Brigadier General T. J. Churchill reported that the strength of Dockery's Brigade was 870 effectives of 900 assigned. On June 25, 1864, a Union intelligence report placed Dockery's Brigade including 900 paroled and exchanged prisoners at Washington, Arkansas.

=== Last Year of the war ===
The remnants of Dockery's 19th Arkansas were consolidated with the 15th and 20th Arkansas Infantry on November 29, 1864, and the consolidated unit renamed as the 3rd Arkansas Consolidated Infantry Regiment. The consolidated regiment was assigned along with the 1st and 2nd Arkansas Consolidated Infantry Regiments to the 2nd (McNair's) Arkansas Brigade, 1st (Churchill's) Arkansas Division, 2nd Corps, Trans-Mississippi Department, from September 1864 to May 1865.

On 22 January 1865, Major General Churchill was ordered to move his division to Minden, Louisiana, and occupy winter quarters. Union commanders in the Department of the Gulf reported on March 20, 1865 that General McNair's brigade was located at Minden, Louisiana, with the rest of Churchill's Division. In early April 1865, the division concentrated near Shreaveport Louisiana, and then moved to Marshall, Texas, by mid-April 1865.

=== Surrender ===
The 3rd Arkansas Consolidated Infantry Regiment was stationed at Marshall, Texas, when the war ended, and was officially surrendered with the Department of the Trans-Mississippi by Major General E. Kirby Smith on May 26, 1865.

== See also ==
- List of Confederate units from Arkansas
- List of American Civil War units by state#Confederate States
