= 17th Arkansas Infantry Regiment (Lemoyne's) =

- Active: 1862–1865
- Disbanded: May 26, 1865
- Country: Confederate States
- Allegiance: Arkansas
- Branch: Army
- Type: Infantry
- Size: Regiment
- Facings: Light blue
- Engagements: American Civil War: Bombardment of Fort Pillow

The 17th (Lemoyne's) Arkansas Infantry (1862–1865) was a Confederate Army infantry regiment during the American Civil War. The regiment did not yet have the required 10 companies when it was ordered east of the Mississippi River with the rest of General Earl Van Dorn's Army of the West. Due to its understrength size the unit was also known as the 17th Arkansas Infantry Battalion. The unit was eventually consolidated with remnants of McCraver's 14th Arkansas Infantry Battalion and the consolidated unit was re-designated as the 21st Arkansas Infantry Regiment. The 21st Arkansas fought in all of the engagements of the Vicksburg campaign, and ended up surrounded and besieged at Vicksburg and surrendered with the rest of Pemberton's command. After being paroled and exchanged back to Arkansas, the regiment was consolidated with the remnants of several other Arkansas regiments to become 1st Arkansas Consolidated Infantry Regiment (Trans-Mississippi).

Another Arkansas Infantry Regiment, first commanded by Colonel Frank A. Rector and later commanded by Colonel John Griffith was also designated as the 17th Arkansas Infantry Regiment (Griffith's).

== Organization ==
The Seventeenth Arkansas regiment was organized from six companies from Conway, Johnson, Pope and Yell counties on January 3, 1862, at Fairfield, Yell county. The regiment recruited only two more before it was ordered east of the Mississippi River by General Earl Van Dorn. The field and staff officers were:

- Colonel George W. Lemoyne.
- Lieutenant Colonel Samuel W. Williams.
- Major Commodore S. Lawrence, of Danville.
- Adjutant William A. Dowdle, of Conway county.

The unit was composed of volunteer companies from the following counties:

- Company A – Commanded by Captain J. M. Dowdle, Organized 07 Oct 1861 at Lewisburg, Conway County. This company was consolidated with company B and became Company D, 21st Ark Infantry.
- Company B – Commanded by Captain Bryan B. King, Organized 01 Nov 1861 at East Fork, Conway County. This company was consolidated with Company A and became Company D, 21st Ark Infantry.
- Company C – Commanded by Captain John Perry, Organized 18 Nov 1861 at Clarksville, Johnson County, became Company C, 21st Ark Infantry.
- Company D – Commanded by Captain John Mills, Organized 03 Nov 1861 at Dardanelle, Yell County, became Company H, 21st Ark Infantry.
- Company E – Commanded by Captain E. B Harrell, Organized 21 Dec 1861 at Dardanelle, Yell County, became Company I, 21st Ark Infantry.
- Company F – Commanded by Captain Mathew L. Bone, Organized 28 Dec 1861 in Yell County. This company was consolidated with Company G and became Company E, 21st Ark Infantry.
- Company G – Commanded by Captain George Harrod, Organized 15 Feb 1862 in Yell County. This company was consolidated with Company F and became Company E, 21st Ark Infantry.
- Company H – Commanded by Captain John Bulls, Organized 15 Feb 1862 at Des Arc, Prairie County, became Company G, 21st Arkansas Infantry.

== Battles ==
The 17th Arkansas was ordered to Jacksonport. Records exist of soldiers from this unit being injured when the steamer Cambridge sank on February 23, 1862, while transporting Lemoyne's regiment across the White River between Grand Glaize and Augusta. The Company G of Yell County and Company H of Prairie County were added on February 15, 1862.

The regiment was ordered to accompany General Van Dorn to Mississippi, and a return of troops shows Lemoyne's regiment, now listed as the 17th Arkansas Battalion at Corinth in early May 1862. During the reorganization of the army at Corinth, the 17th Arkansas was consolidated with McCarver's 14th Arkansas, and redesignated as the 21st Arkansas Regiment. The existing 21st Arkansas was redesignated as the 15th (Northwest) Arkansas Infantry.

The 21st Arkansas Infantry Regiment was assigned to the Army of the West under General Price in north Mississippi and participated with credit in the battle of Corinth.

The 21st Arkansas Infantry Regiment took part in the Battle of Big Black River Bridge, May 17, 1863, and endured the Siege of Vicksburg until the capitulation of Pemberton, July 4, 1863. Colonel Cravens was captured at the Big Black and, with the other officers, was sent a prisoner to Johnson's Island. Colonel Cravens became circuit judge and representative in Congress; Colonel Pitman, circuit judge and State senator; Capt. B. B. Chisom, secretary of State; F. J. Spurlin, private, who lost a leg, was many years treasurer of Garland county; Col. O. P. Lyles became representative in Congress.

== Consolidation and Surrender ==
In September 1864, 21st Arkansas Infantry Regiment was consolidated with the remnants of 14th Arkansas Infantry Regiment (Powers'), 15th (Northwest) Arkansas Infantry Regiment, and the 16th Arkansas Infantry Regiment in the Army of the Trans-Mississippi, and designated as the 1st Arkansas Consolidated Infantry Regiment (Trans-Mississippi) under the command of Colonel Jordan E. Cravens. The 1st Arkansas Consolidated Infantry (Trans-Mississippi) Regiment was surrendered by General Kirby Smith with the remainder of the Department of the Trans-Mississippi on May 26, 1865.

== See also ==
- List of Confederate units from Arkansas
- Confederate Units by State
