= 21st Arkansas Infantry Regiment =

The 21st Arkansas Infantry Regiment was the designation of several units of the Confederate Army during the American Civil War. They were :

- 21st Arkansas Infantry Regiment (Craven's), formed May 1862, finished at Vicksburg July 1863
- 21st (McCrae's) Arkansas Infantry Regiment, formed July 1863 but redesignated 15th (North-West) Arkansas Infantry Regiment
