= Jordan E. Cravens =

American politician

Jordan Edgar Cravens
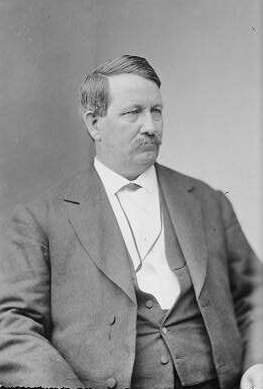

Member of the U.S. House of Representatives from Arkansas's 3rd district
- In office March 4, 1877 – March 3, 1883
- Preceded by: William W. Wilshire
- Succeeded by: John H. Rogers

Member of the Arkansas Senate from the 6th district
- In office November 5, 1866 – April 2, 1868
- Preceded by: Redistricted
- Succeeded by: John N. Sarber
- Constituency: Johnson and Pope counties

Member of the Arkansas House of Representatives from the Johnson County district
- In office November 5, 1860 – November 5, 1862 Serving with L. Robinson
- Preceded by: S. Farmer
- Succeeded by: L.B. Howell

Personal details
- Born: November 7, 1830 Fredericktown, Missouri, U.S.
- Died: April 8, 1914 (aged 83) Fort Smith, Arkansas, U.S.
- Party: Independent Democrat; Democratic
- Spouse: Emma Batson
- Children: Jeane, Jane, Felix, Sallie, and Samuella

Military service
- Allegiance: Confederate States of America
- Branch/service: Confederate States Army
- Years of service: 1861 to 1865
- Rank: Colonel
- Unit: 1st Arkansas Consolidated Infantry Regiment (Trans-Mississippi)
- Battles/wars: Civil War: Battle of Dug Springs

Jordan Edgar Cravens (November 7, 1830 – April 8, 1914) was an American lawyer and politician who served as a U.S. representative from Arkansas. From 1877 to 1883, he served three terms in Congress, first as an independent Democrat, then as a Democrat.

He was the cousin of William Ben Cravens.

== Biography ==
Born in Fredericktown, Missouri in 1830, Cravens was the son of Nehemiah and Sophia Thompson Cravens. He moved with his father to Arkansas the following year, and attended the common schools.

He was graduated from the Cane Hill Academy at Boonsboro (now Canehill), Washington County, Arkansas, in 1850. He studied law and was admitted to the bar in 1854. He commenced practice in Clarksville, Arkansas.

Prior to the Civil War, he we was elected as member of the Arkansas House of Representatives in 1860, serving in the 13th Arkansas General Assembly. He later served in the Arkansas Senate during the 16th Arkansas General Assembly, representing Johnson and Pope counties.

=== Personal life ===
Cravens owned slaves. He married Emma Batson and they had five children, Jeane, Jane, Felix, Sallie, and Samuella. Emma Batson's father was Felix Ives Batson an Arkansas Supreme Court judge who during the American Civil War, represented the First Congressional District of northwest Arkansas in the First Confederate Congress and the Second Confederate Congress House of Representatives.

== Civil War ==
Cravens entered the Confederate States Army in 1861 as a private in Company C, 17th Arkansas Infantry Regiment (Lemoyne's). When that regiment underwent consolidation in May 1862, Cravens was elected Colonel of the new unit: the 21st Arkansas Infantry Regiment. The 21st Arkansas was surrendered, at Vicksburg, Mississippi, on July 4, 1863. After being declared exchanged, on September 12, 1863, Cravens' unit was consolidated with the 14th Powers' Arkansas, 15th (Northwest) Arkansas, and the 16th Arkansas, to form a new unit: the 1st Arkansas Consolidated Infantry Regiment (Trans-Mississippi) Department. He was named colonel of the new organization.

=== Post-war career ===
At the close of hostilities, Cravens returned to Clarksville where he served as prosecuting attorney of Johnson County in 1865 and 1866 and then as member of the Arkansas State Senate from 1866 until 1868. He did not seek re-election and returned to his law practice.

=== Congress ===
In 1876, Cravens was elected as an Independent Democrat to the Forty-fifth Congress, winning a contested three-way race with 37% of the vote. His margin of victory was fewer than 300 votes over second-place candidate John McClure.

In 1878, he was reelected as a Democrat to the 46th Congress, then won a third term in 1880 with 58% of the vote, defeating former congressman Thomas Boles

In 1882, Cravens lost in the Democratic primary to local judge John H. Rogers. In all, Cravens served in Congress from March 4, 1877, until March 3, 1883.

=== Later career ===
He then resumed the practice of law in Clarksville, Arkansas.

He remained active in politics, being mentioned for various offices, including governor and a return to Congress. In 1889, he won election as a local circuit court judge, serving from 1890 until 1894.

== Death ==
Cravens died in Fort Smith, Arkansas on April 8, 1914, (age 83 years, 152 days) and is interred at Oakland Cemetery, Clarksville, Arkansas.

U.S. House of Representatives
Preceded by Thomas Boles	Member of the U.S. House of Representatives from Arkansas's 3rd congressional district 1877–1883	Succeeded by Thomas M. Gunter
