= 21st Arkansas Infantry Regiment (Craven's) =

- Active: 1862–1865
- Disbanded: May 26, 1865
- Country: Confederate States
- Allegiance: Arkansas
- Branch: Army
- Size: Regiment
- Engagements: American Civil War: Iuka-Corinth Campaign; Second Battle of Corinth; Vicksburg Campaign; Battle of Port Gibson; Battle of Champion's Hill; Battle of Big Black River Bridge; Siege of Vicksburg

Commanders
- Notable commanders: Col. Jordan E. Cravens

The 21st Arkansas Infantry (1862–1865) was a Confederate Army infantry regiment during the American Civil War. The unit was organized from the consolidation of two understrength Arkansas units in May 1862. The unit participated in the Iuka-Corinth Campaign before becoming part of the garrison of Vicksburg Mississippi. After the capitulation of Confederate forces at Vicksburg, the 21st was paroled and exchanged back to Arkansas where it was combined with the remnants of several there Arkansas regiments to become the 1st Arkansas Consolidated Infantry Regiment (Trans-Mississippi). Another Arkansas Confederate infantry regiment, commanded by Colonel Dandridge McRae was also labeled the "21st Arkansas". To avoid confusion between two 21st Arkansas Regiments, McRae's regiment was later redesignated as the 15th (Northwest) Arkansas Infantry Regiment (making a total of three 15th Arkansas Regiments).

== Organization ==
21st Arkansas Infantry Regiment was organized on May 15, 1862, by consolidating four companies of McCarver's 14th Arkansas and six companies of Lemoyne's 17th Arkansas Regiments, (also known as the 17th and 18th Arkansas Battalions) to form the 21st (McCarver's) Arkansas Regiment.

The unit was composed of the following companies:

- Company A – Commanded by Captain E.O. Wolfe. This company, originally organized at Pittman's Ferry, Arkansas, was previously assigned as Company C, McCarver's 14th Arkansas.
- Company B – Commanded by Captain John M. Wasson. This company, originally organized at Pocahontas, Arkansas, was previously assigned as Company I, McCarver's 14th Arkansas.
- Company C – Commanded by Captain Harper S. Taylor. This company, from Johnson County, was previously assigned as Company C, Lemoyne's 17th Arkansas.
- Company D – Commanded by Captain George W. Berryman. This company was formed by the consolidation of Companies A and B, of Lemoyne's 17th Arkansas. Both of these companies were originally raised in Conway County.
- Company E – Commanded by Captain Mathew L. Bone. This company was formed by the consolidation of Companies F and G of Lemoyne's 17th Arkansas. Both of these companies were originally raised in Yell County.
- Company F – Commanded by Captain T. J. Shinpox. This company, enlisted at Pittman's Ferry, Arkansas, was previously assigned as Company K, McCarver's 14th Arkansas. Prior to being assigned to the 14th, this company had served as Company D, 1st Battalion, 2nd Arkansas 30 Day Volunteer Regiment. The company had originally been organized as a volunteer company in the 25th Regiment, Arkansas State Militia, from Lawrence (Modern Woodruff) County.
- Company G – Commanded by Captain Jacob G. Becton. This company, from Prairie County, was previously assigned as Company H, Lemoyne's 17th Arkansas.
- Company H – Commanded by Captain John W. Mills. This company, from Yell County, was previously assigned as Company D, Lemoyne's 17th Arkansas.
- Company I – Commanded by Captain Calvin C. Nailor. This company, from Yell County, was previously assigned as Company E, Lemoyne's 17th Arkansas.
- Company K – Commanded by Captain Green F. Bond.

Colonels Jordan E. Cravens and William G. Matheny, and Majors W. M. Dowdle and Harrison Moore were in command.

== Service ==
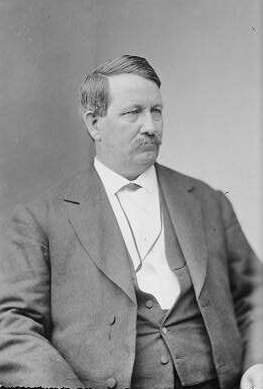
Jordan E. Cravens

During the Iuka-Corinth Campaign, the 21st Arkansas was assigned to Brigadier General William L. Cabell's brigade of Brigadier General Dabney H. Maury's Division of Major General Sterling Price's 1st Corps the Confederate (Army of the West). During the Second Battle of Corinth, the 21st made a gallant attack on the Union works. The attack was described thus by one participating veteran of the 14th and later 21st Arkansas Infantry Regiment:

I saw Major Dowdle just ahead of our line on his horse and, just as I caught sight of him he threw up his hands, dropped his saber and fell backwards and lay on his horse till the horse ran about twenty yards, when he fell off. The horse ran but a short distance until he fell. John Black, a son of Thomas Black (deceased) of Melbourne, Izard County, was our color bearer and ours was the oldest company. John fell when about eighty yards from the Federal line, while bravely bearing his flag; his head was nearly all gone. Bill Garner then raised the colors but did not go but a few steps till he fell with one leg shot so nearly off that he cut it off with his pocket knife. I don't know how many times the flag fell but it was raised as often as it fell and, I believe was carried off the field by Lieut. Col. Matheny. When within bout seventy-five yards of the Federal line I fell, shot through the neck just behind the ears, and lay there for a while, then went into a ditch where one or two other wounded men were.

The regiment reported 27 killed, 41 wounded, and 58 missing following the battles of Battles of Corinth and Hatchie Bridge.

The regiment was assigned to Brigadier General Martin E. Green's brigade of Major General John S. Bowen's Division, of Lieutenant General John C. Pemberton's Army of Mississippi for the Vicksburg Campaign. When General Green was killed on June 27, 1863, Colonel Dockery of the 19th Arkansas was placed in command of Second Brigade. In January 1863, the 21st Arkansas joined the defenses of the approaches to Vicksburg, and joined the garrison fortifying Grand Gulf on the Mississippi River below Vicksburg. On April 29, 1863, Admiral David Porter's fleet of gunboats bombarded Grand Gulf in an attempt to clear the position in preparation for Grant's amphibious crossing of the Mississippi. Repulsed by the strong position and batteries at Grand Gulf, Grant moved further downstream to cross at Bruinsburg, Mississippi, flanking the Grand Gulf garrison out of their position. Marching to block the Union advance, Green's Brigade and the 21st Arkansas joined Confederate forces at the battles of Port Gibson on May 1, at Champion Hill and the Big Black River bridge on May 16 and 17, respectively, and was besieged at Vicksburg from May 19 until July 4, 1863. The unit suffered 37 casualties at Port Gibson early May and later had men (including Colonel Craven) captured at the battle of the Big Black River. The 21st Arkansas fell back to Vicksburg, where it endured the forty-day siege.

This regiment surrendered with the Army of Mississippi at Vicksburg, Mississippi, July 4, 1863. General U. S. Grant initially demanded the conditional surrender of the Vicksburg garrison, but faced with the necessity of feeding 30,000 starving Confederates and having the idea that these soldiers might do more harm to the Confederate cause by being released to return home rather than being exchanged as whole units, he relented and allowed for the immediate parole of the unit. According to the Confederate War Department, Union leader encouraged the surrendered confederates to simply return home, rather than being officially paroled and exchanged. The able bodied Confederate soldiers who were released on parole walked out of Vicksburg (they were not allowed to proceed in any military formations) on July 11, 1863. Paroling of these able bodied men was completed in their respective regimental camps inside Vicksburg prior to the July 11th. The soldiers of the 15th Northwest Arkansas were paroled on July 8 and 9, 1863. Those who were wounded or sick in the various hospitals in Vicksburg were paroled, and were released as soon as they could leave on their own. July 15/16 is the most common date of these Vicksburg hospital paroles. Some of the most seriously wounded and sick were sent by steamship down the Mississippi River and over to Mobile, Alabama, where they were delivered on parole to Confederate authorities.

Confederate commanders designated Enterprise, Mississippi as the rendezvous point (parole camp) for the Vicksburg parolees to report to after they got clear of the last Federal control point at Big Black Bridge. Most of the Arkansas units appeared to have bypassed the established parole camps, and possibly with the support or at least by the compliancy of their Union captors, simply crossed the river and returned home. Because so many of the Vicksburg parolees, especially from Arkansas, simply went home, Major General Pemberton requested Confederate President Davis to grant the men a thirty- to sixty-day furlough. The furloughs were not strictly adhered to so long as the soldier eventually showed up at a parole camp to be declared exchanged and returned to duty. Those who went directly home were treated as if they had been home on furlough if they eventually reported into one of these two parole centers. The exchange declaration reports issued by Colonel Robert Ould in Richmond for various units in the Vicksburg and Port Hudson surrenders began in September 1863 based upon men who actually reported into one of the two parole camps. Pemberton eventually coordinated with the Confederate War Department and Confederate General Kirby Smith, commanding the Department of the Trans-Mississippi to have the Arkansas Vicksburg parolee's rendezvous point established at Camden, Arkansas.

As the 21st Arkansas Regiment, under Colonel Jordan E. Cravens, this regiment fought in the following engagements:

- Iuka-Corinth Campaign
  - Second Battle of Corinth
- Vicksburg Campaign
  - Battle of Port Gibson
  - Battle of Champion's Hill
  - Battle of Big Black River Bridge
  - Siege of Vicksburg

After being paroled and exchanged, the 21st Arkansas was consolidated with the 15th Northwest Arkansas, 16th Arkansas, and Powers' 14th Arkansas Infantry Regiments to form the 1st Consolidated Arkansas Infantry (Trans-Mississippi), and was stationed at Marshall, Texas, when the war ended. The consolidated regiment was assigned along with the 2nd Arkansas Consolidated Infantry Regiment and the 3rd Arkansas Consolidated Infantry Regiment and to the 2nd (McNair's) Arkansas Brigade, 1st (Churchill's) Arkansas Division, 2nd Corps, Trans-Mississippi Department, from September 1864 to May 1865.

== Surrender ==
The 1st Arkansas Consolidated Infantry Regiment surrendered with the Department of the Trans-Mississippi, General E. Kirby Smith commanding, May 26, 1865. When the Trans-Mississippi Department surrendered, all of the Arkansas infantry regiments were encamped in and around Marshall, Texas (war-ravaged Arkansas no longer able to subsist the army). The regiments were ordered to report to Shreveport, Louisiana, to be paroled. None of them did so. Some soldiers went to Shreveport on their own to be paroled, but the regiments simply disbanded without formally surrendering. A company or two managed to keep together until they got home.

== See also ==
- List of Confederate units from Arkansas
- Confederate Units by State
