= 15th Arkansas Infantry Regiment =

The 15th Arkansas Infantry Regiment was the designation of several units of the Confederate Army during the American Civil War. They were:

- 15th Arkansas Infantry Regiment (Josey's), formed May 1861 as Cleburne's Regt. Became Josey's Regt in December 1862, served until April 1865
- 15th Arkansas Infantry Regiment (Johnson's), formed January 1862 as Gee's Regiment. Finished at Ft Donelson February 1862. Reformed as Johnson's Regt, finished at Port Hudson July 1863
- 15th (Northwest) Arkansas Infantry Regiment, formed July 1861 as MacRae's Regt. Finished at Vicksburg July 1863
