= 14th Arkansas Infantry Regiment =

The 14th Arkansas Infantry Regiment was the designation of two units of the Confederate Army during the American Civil War. They were :

- 14th Arkansas Infantry Regiment (Powers'), formed in July 1861 as Mitchell's Regiment. Became Powers' Regt in May 1862, finished at Port Hudson July 1863
- 14th Arkansas Infantry Regiment (McCarver's), formed October 1861, and was consolidated in May 1862 into the 21st AIR
