= 17th Arkansas Infantry Regiment =

The 17th Arkansas Infantry Regiment was the designation of two units of the Confederate Army during the American Civil War. They were :

- 17th Arkansas Infantry Regiment (Lemoyne's), formed August 1861, finished at Vicksburg July 1863
- 17th Arkansas Infantry Regiment (Griffith's), formed as Rector's Regt. in November 1861. Became Griffith's Regt in March 1862. Was consolidated into 11th/17th Mounted Infantry, March 1863
