= 16th Arkansas Infantry Regiment =

Infantry regiment of the Confederate States Army

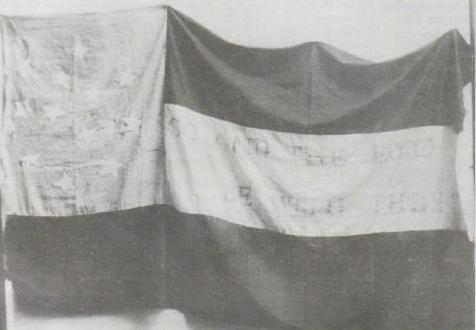
- National color of the Sixteenth Arkansas
- Active: 1861–1864
- Disbanded: September 1864
- Country: Confederate States
- Allegiance: Arkansas
- Branch: Army
- Type: Infantry
- Size: Regiment
- Facings: Light blue
- Arms: Minie rifles
- Battles: American Civil War; Battle of Pea Ridge; Siege of Corinth; Battle of Farmington; Battle of Iuka; Second Battle of Corinth; Siege of Port Hudson (surrendered)

The 16th Arkansas Infantry Regiment (also known as the "Sixteenth Arkansas") was an infantry formation in the Confederate States Army during the American Civil War. Organized from volunteer companies from northwest Arkansas, the regiment participated in the Pea Ridge Campaign before crossing the Mississippi River and becoming involved in the Iuka-Corinth Campaign and the Siege of Port Hudson. After being surrendered with the garrison of Port Hudson the unit was reorganized in Arkansas and consolidated with the remnants of several other Arkansas Regiments to become the 1st Consolidated Arkansas Infantry.

== Formation ==
The Sixteenth Arkansas was mustered in on December 4, 1861 (near present-day Rogers) in Benton County, Arkansas. The field and staff at the time were:

- Colonel John F. Hill, of Johnson County
- Lieutenant Colonel William T. Neal, of Washington
- Major Samuel Farmer, of Johnson County
- Adjutant Ben Pixlee
- Quartermaster A. M. Ward

The regiment was composed of the following companies:

- Company A – Commanded by Captain L. N.C. Swaggerty, of Johnson County
- Company B – "the South Johnson Rifles" – Captain George Turner, of Johnson County. This company was originally organized on July 10, 1861, as a Volunteer Company in the 10th Regiment, Arkansas State Militia.
- Company C – Commanded by Captain John Connolly, of Johnson County
- Company D – Commanded by Captain W.W. Bailey, of Carroll County
- Company E – Commanded by Captain Garrett, of Carroll County
- Company F – Commanded by Captain Goodnight, of Stone County
- Company G – the "Washington County Mounted Volunteers", Commanded by Captain Carnahan, of Washington County. This company was originally organized on June 5, 1861, as a volunteer company, under the command of Captain William T. Neal in the 32nd Regiment, Arkansas State Militia.
- Company H – the "Pike County Rangers" – commanded by Captain Kelly, of Pike County
- Company I – Commanded by Captain Daniel Boone, of Madison County
- Company K – Commanded by Captain John Lawrence, of Searcy County

The regiment went into camp at Elm Springs, Benton county, where it remained in winter quarters until February, 1862, when General Price and his army of Missouri fell back before a large force of Federals under General Curtis, and made a stand at Elkhorn tavern in Benton county.

== History ==
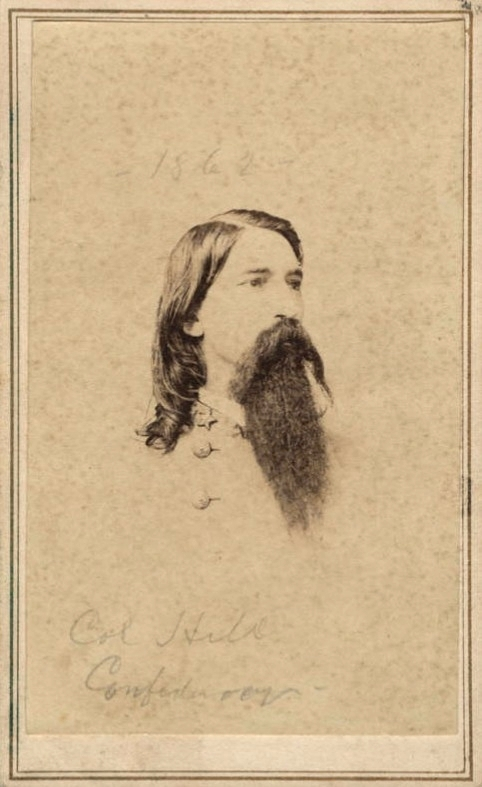
Hill in uniform, c. 1862

The 16th Arkansas was initially assigned to the Brigade of Colonel Louis Herbert in Brigadier General Ben MCulloch's Division in northwest Arkansas. On March 4, the brigade marched along with Major General Earl Van Dorn's Army of the West to reinforce Major General Sterling Price and took part in the Battle of Pea Ridge on March 7, 1862. At Pea Ridge, the regiment lost 6 killed or mortally wounded, 5 wounded and 12 missing or captured. BG McCulloch was killed on the Leetown battlefield at Pea Ridge on March 7 while advancing with the 16th Arkansas. After the battle the 16th Arkansas could muster only 24 officers and 282 men present for duty.

The Army of the West retreated through Van Buren, Arkansas, along the Arkansas River, to Duvall's Bluff, it being Gernal Van Dorn's intention to launch an invasion of Missouri from Northeast Arkansas. Van Dorn's plans were interrupted by orders to move his forces east of the Mississippi River and to unite with Confederate forces which were concentrating for the upcoming Battle of Shiloh. The Army of the West arrived too late for the Battle of Shiloh and settled into camps near Corinth, Mississippi. The 16th Arkansas was assigned, with four Missouri regiments, to a brigade commanded by Brigadier General Henry Little.

In May 1862 the Confederate Army underwent an army-wide reorganization due to the passage of the Conscription Act by the Confederate Congress in April 1862. All twelve-month regiments had to re-muster and enlist for three years or the duration of the war; a new election of officers was ordered; and men who were exempted from service by age or other reasons under the Conscription Act were allowed to take a discharge and go home. Officers who did not choose to stand for re-election were also offered a discharge. The 16th Arkansas was re-organized at Corinth, Mississippi, on May 6, 1862, and the following officers chosen:

- Colonel David Provence.
- Lieutenant Colonel B.T. Pixlee.
- Major J.M. Pitman.
- Adjutant. John S. Tutt.
- Quartermaster Arch McKennon.
- Commissary Sam Hays.
- Sergeant Major David Bronaugh.

The company commanders at reorganization were:

- Company A, Captain Lorenzo N.C. Swaggerty.
- Company B, Captain Jesse L. Cravens.
- Company C, Captain James Yearwood.
- Company D, Captain E. G. Mitchell.
- Company E, Lieutenant J. H. Berry.
- Company F, Captain William B. Stevens.
- Company G, Captain J. P. Carnahan.
- Company H, Captain Grandison D.R. Preston, then J.B. Cloud.
- Company I, Captain. Daniel Boone.
- Company K, Captain James Waldron.

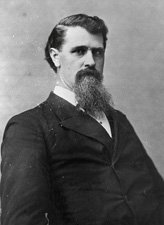
James Henderson Berry, a lieutenant in Company E, lost his right leg during the Battle of Corinth and later served as the governor of Arkansas from 1883 to 1885

The regiment participated in the movements around Corinth on the approach of the Union army under General Halleck and suffered 3 wounded and 3 missing or captured. During the Battle of Farmington, Mississippi, 26 May 1862, the 16th Arkansas lost 6 killed or mortally wounded, 4 wounded and 3 missing or captured. In September 1862, it took part in the Battle of Iuka, where 2 men of the 16th Arkansas were wounded and 1 captured. The 16th Arkansas participated in the desperate assault on the Federal lines at the Second Battle of Corinth on October 3–4. 1862 where it lost heavily in the assault on Battery Powell. It reported 13 killed and 29 wounded, including Lieutenant J. H. Berry, who lost a leg in this battle. Shortly after, the regiment was detached from the Missouri brigade and assigned to the Arkansas brigade, commanded by Colonel Jordan E. Cravens, Arkansas troops, at Holly Springs, Miss. It was there again detached and sent with other Arkansas regiments to Port Hudson, Louisiana. On January 7, 1863 Major General Frank Gardner issued General Order No. 5 which consolidated several under strength Arkansas units:

The troops of this post will be organized into brigades, arranged at the breastworks as follows.... III. Brigadier-General Beall’s brigade will consist of the consolidated regiment consisting of the Fourteenth, Sixteenth, Seventeenth, Eighteenth, Twenty-third Arkansas Regiments, and First Arkansas Battalion, commanded by Col. R. H. Crockett; the consolidated regiment consisting of the Eleventh and Fifteenth Arkansas Regiments, commanded by Col. John L. Logan

The order was apparently later modified. Logan's consolidated regiment consisted of the 11th and the Griffith's 17th Arkansas. The Johnson's 15th Arkansas was assigned to Crockett's consolidated regiment instead of the 17th.

The regiment went through the siege of forty-eight days, and was surrendered to General Banks July 9, 1863. Lieutenant Colonel Pixlee was killed during the siege, and Major J. M. Pitman succeeded him; Captain Swaggerty, of Company A, becoming major, and Lieutenant Jesse Adams, captain of Company A. 32 officers and 215 surrendered at Port Hudson for a total of 247 survivors. The officers were sent as prisoners to Johnson's island, except Captain Daniel Boone, Lieutenant J. G. Crump and William Henry McConnell, who swam ashore from the transport conveying them and made their escape. Captain Jim Cravens and Lieutenants Paynor, W. W. Bailey and Wilson escaped through the lines and returned to their homes in Arkansas, where they re-entered the service in other commands.

In September 1864, 16th Arkansas Infantry was consolidated with the remnants of 14th Arkansas, 15th, and 21st in the Army of the Trans-Mississippi, and designated as the 1st Consolidated Arkansas Infantry under the command of Colonel Jordan E. Cravens. The 1st Arkansas Consolidated Infantry (Trans-Mississippi) Regiment was surrendered by General Kirby Smith with the remainder of the Department of the Trans-Mississippi on May 26, 1865.

== National color ==
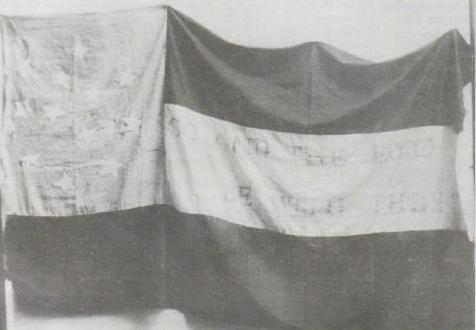
National Color of the 16th Arkansas Infantry Regiment from 1861 until 1862

Many of the original companies raised for the war received hand made flags which were presented to them in elaborate ceremonies in their hometown before marching off to war. In the first year of the war, many of these homemade banners were "First National Flag" pattern, meaning that they were patterned after the first national flag authorized for the new Confederate Government. The new Confederate Banner, often referred to as the "Stars and Bars", consisted of "a red field, with a white space extending horizontally through the center, equal in width to one third the width of the flag, and red spaces above and below to the same width as the white, the union blue extending down through the white space and stopping in the lower red space, in the center of the union, a circle of white stars corresponding in number with the States of the Confederacy." The white stripe was a convenient place for the flag makers to embellish the flag with some motto or inscription.

One of these "First National" pattern flags was given to the Joe Wright Guards, which became Company H, 4th Regiment, Arkansas State Troops. The flag was made by Ms. Josephine Wright and Ms. Jane Bailey. The flag is 36 in × 72 in (910 mm × 1,830 mm) and has the words "GO AND THE LORD BE WITH THEE" painted on the white stripe. The flag was allegedly chosen for the colors of the 4th Regiment. After the 4th Regiment was disbanded, many of the former members of the Joe Wright Guards joined Company D, of the new 16th Arkansas Infantry Regiment, and according to the Memoirs of Captain J. B. Bailey, the flag was chosen as the regimental colors of the 16th. The flag was carried by the 16th Arkansas during the Battle of Iuka and the Battle of Hatchie's Bridge during the Iuka-Corinth Campaign. The flag was retired when the 16th Arkansas was issued a new Van Dorn Pattern Battle Flag. The 16th Arkansas was captured during the Siege of Port Hudson, but the old set of colors was smuggled out and returned to the family of Ms. Wright. The flag remained in the family until 1981, when it was donated to the Atlanta Civil War Museum, but the current location of the flag is unknown.

== See also ==
- List of Arkansas Civil War Confederate units
- Confederate Units by State

== Bibliography ==
- Baker, T. Lindsay, ed. (2007). Confederate Guerrilla: The Civil War Memoir of Joseph M. Bailey. Civil War in the West. Fayetteville: The University of Arkansas Press. ISBN 978-1-55728-838-7. OCLC 85018566. OL 8598848M.
- Brock, Kevin. "The Sixteenth Arkansas Volunteer Infantry, C.S.A.: A History of an Upcountry Regiment, 1861-1863." Master's thesis, University of Arkansas, 1998.
- Miller, Mark. "If I should Live": A History of the 16th Arkansas Confederate Infantry, 1861-1863. (Conway, AR: Arkansas Research, 2000).
