= Battle of Iuka =

1862 battle of the American Civil War

Coordinates: 34.7936°N 88.2101°W

- Part of the American Civil War
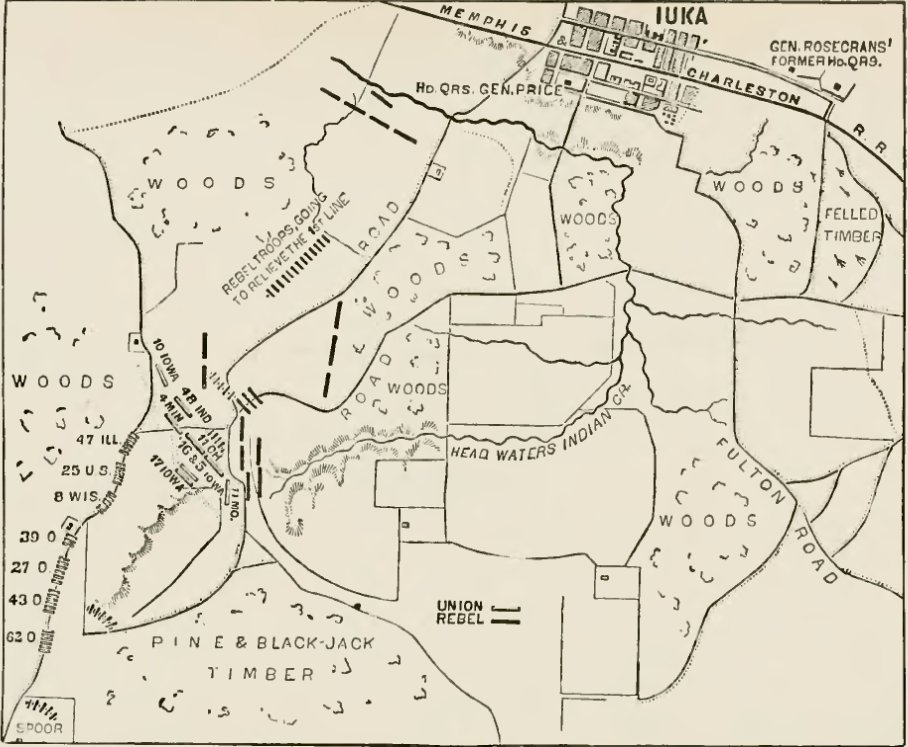
- Map of the Battle of Iuka
Date	September 19, 1862
Location	Near Iuka, Mississippi
Result	Union victory

Belligerents
United States (Union)	Confederate States

Commanders and leaders
(United States) William S. Rosecrans	(Confederate States of America) Sterling Price

Units involved
Army of the Mississippi	Army of the West

Strength
~4,500	3,179

Casualties and losses
790 total (144 killed; 598 wounded; 40 captured/missing)	594 total (85 killed; 400 wounded; 109 captured/missing)
- Location within Mississippi

The Battle of Iuka was fought on September 19, 1862, in Iuka, Mississippi, during the American Civil War. In the opening battle of the Iuka-Corinth Campaign, Union Brigadier General William S. Rosecrans stopped the advance of the Confederate Army of the West commanded by Maj. Gen. Sterling Price.

Union Major General Ulysses S. Grant brought two armies to confront Price in a pincer movement: a double envelopment, with Rosecrans' Army of the Mississippi approaching Iuka from the southwest, and three divisions of their own Army of the Tennessee, under Maj. Gen. Edward Ord, approaching from the northwest. Such a movement was difficult to pull off during the Civil War, especially in bad terrain such as at Iuka, because it required that both jaws of the pincer reach the enemy at the same time, and in the early days of the war, before telegraph communications had been become sufficiently sophisticated, other methods of coordination needed to be used, in this case, the sound of the battle starting. Although Grant and Ord planned to attack in conjunction with Rosecrans when they heard the sound of battle, an acoustic shadow suppressed the sound and prevented them from realizing that the battle had begun.

After an afternoon of fighting, entirely by Rosecrans' men, the Confederates withdrew from Iuka on a road that had not been blocked by the Union army, marching to rendezvous with Confederate Maj. Gen. Earl Van Dorn, with whom they would soon fight the Second Battle of Corinth against Rosecrans.

== Background ==
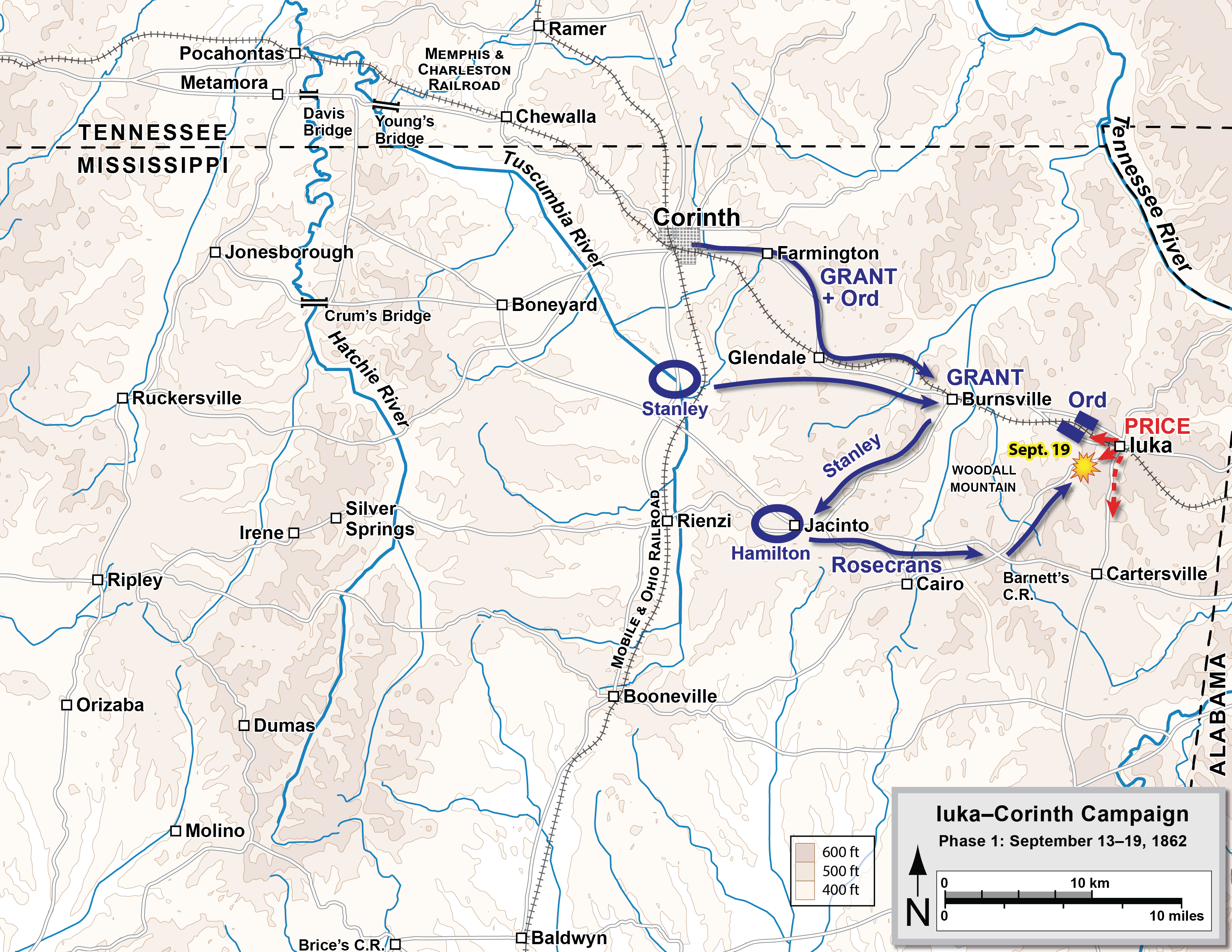
Opening of Iuka-Corinth Campaign

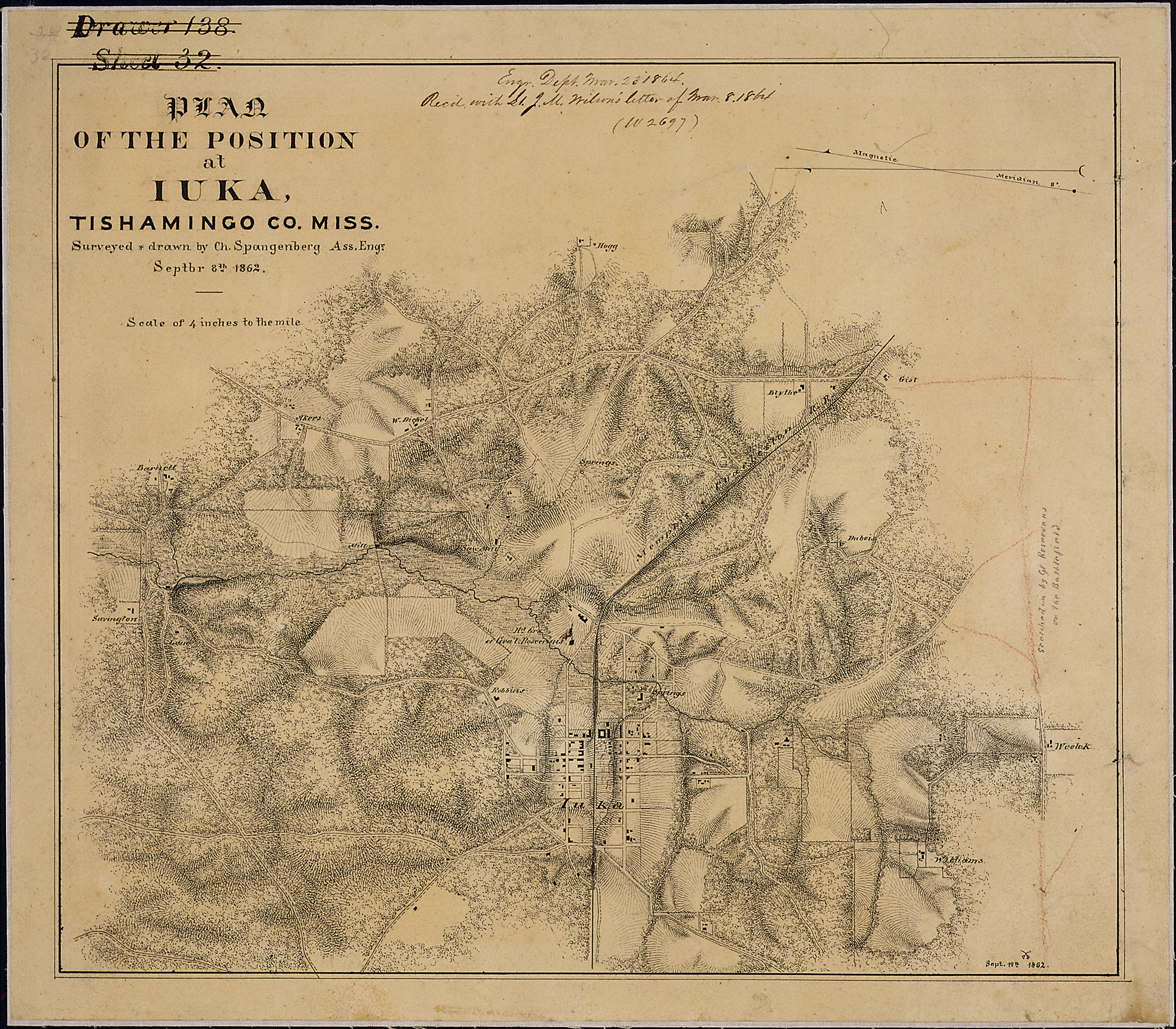
Map of Iuka September 8, 1862

After the Siege of Corinth in May 1862, Maj. Gen. Henry Halleck was promoted to be general in chief of the Union Army and Maj. Gen. Ulysses S. Grant replaced him in command at Corinth, Mississippi. This command was smaller than Halleck's, however, because the Army of the Ohio under Maj. Gen. Don Carlos Buell now operated as a separate command, leaving Grant command of only his own Army of the Tennessee and Maj. Gen. William S. Rosecrans' Army of the Mississippi, together about 100,000 men. Since the Confederates had evacuated Corinth that summer, Grant's forces had been engaged in protecting supply lines in western Tennessee and northern Mississippi, with Maj. Gen. William Tecumseh Sherman's division in Memphis, Maj. Gen. Edward O. C. Ord's division guarding the Union supply line at Corinth, and Rosecrans' army holding the railroad from Corinth east to Iuka. As Confederate General Braxton Bragg moved north from Tennessee into Kentucky in September 1862, Buell pursued him from Nashville. The Confederates needed to prevent Buell from being reinforced by Grant's command.

Confederate Maj. Gen. Sterling Price had been ordered by Bragg to move his Army of the West from Tupelo toward Nashville, Tennessee, in conjunction with Bragg's Kentucky offensive. On September 13, his army reached the town of Iuka in northeastern Mississippi, about 20 miles east of Corinth. It was a small Union supply depot, the easternmost outpost that Grant had established on the Memphis and Charleston Railroad. Price's cavalry skirmished with pickets posted by the small Union garrison stationed there. On September 14, before dawn, the Union commander, Col. Robert C. Murphy of the 8th Wisconsin Infantry, set fire to the supplies of the depot and marched his 2,000-man brigade back to Corinth. The Confederates dashed in and doused the flames, reaping a large collection of valuable supplies. Rosecrans relieved Murphy and ordered him to be court-martialed.

Price's army settled in Iuka and awaited the arrival of Maj. Gen. Earl Van Dorn's Army of West Tennessee, approximately 7,000 men. The two generals intended to unite and attack Grant's lines of communication in western Tennessee, which would prevent Buell's reinforcement if Grant reacted the way they expected, or might allow them to follow Bragg and support his Northern invasion if Grant acted more passively.

Grant did not wait to be attacked, approving a plan to converge on Price with two columns before Van Dorn, four days march to the southwest, could reinforce him. Grant sent Ord with three Army of the Tennessee divisions (about 8,000 men) along the Memphis and Charleston Railroad to move to Burnsville, take the roads to the north of the railroad and move upon Iuka from the northwest. He also ordered Rosecrans' army on a coordinated move along the Mobile and Ohio Railroad that would bring two divisions (9,000 men) swinging into Iuka from the southwest, closing the escape route for Price's army, while the remainder of that army protected Corinth against any threat from Van Dorn. The relatively complex plan for the two-pronged assault was actually Rosecrans', who had previously been stationed in Iuka and felt familiar with the area. Grant moved with Ord's headquarters and had little tactical control over Rosecrans during the battle.

== Opposing forces ==
=== Union ===
Principal Union commanders
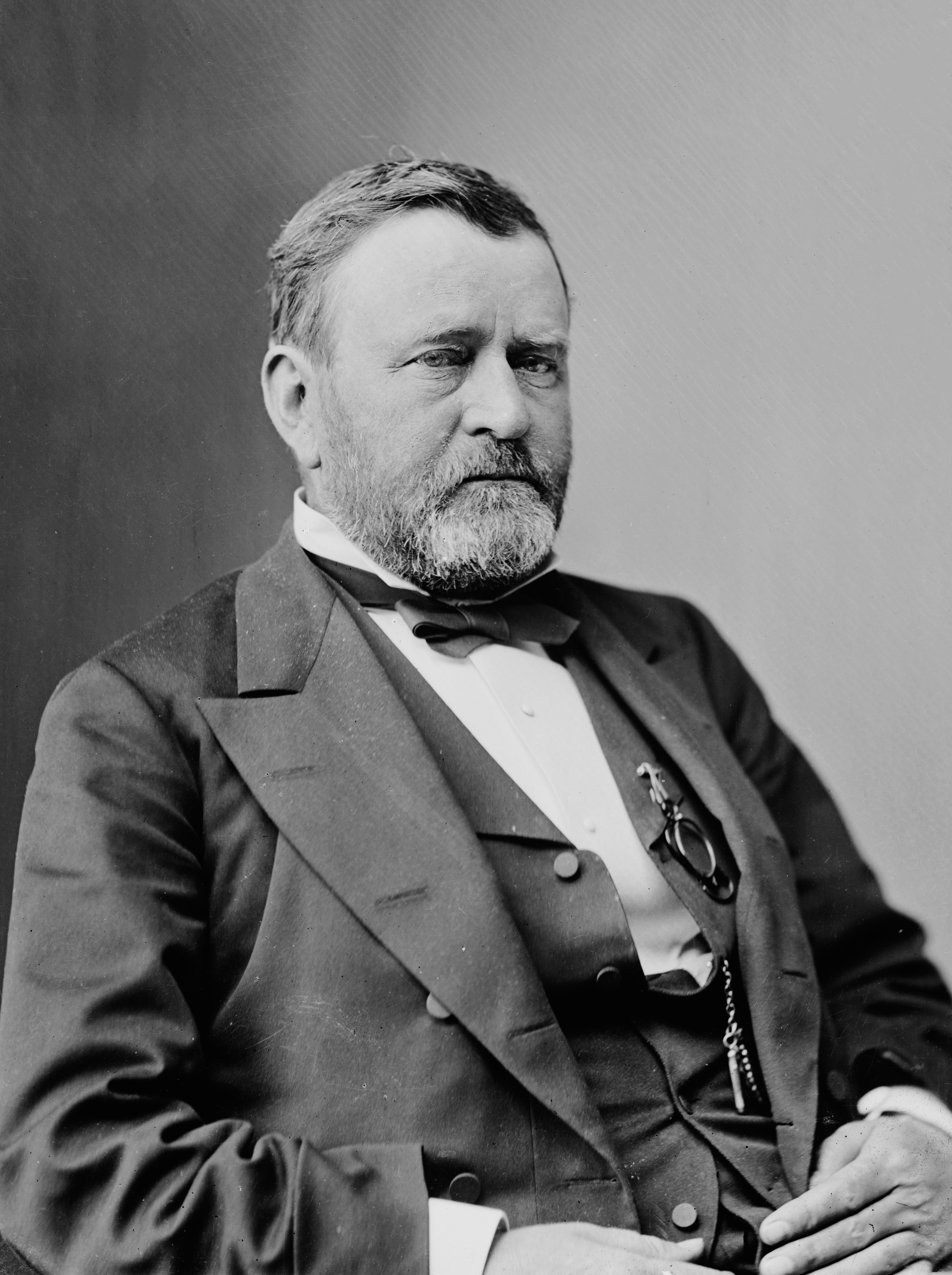
Maj. Gen. Ulysses S. Grant

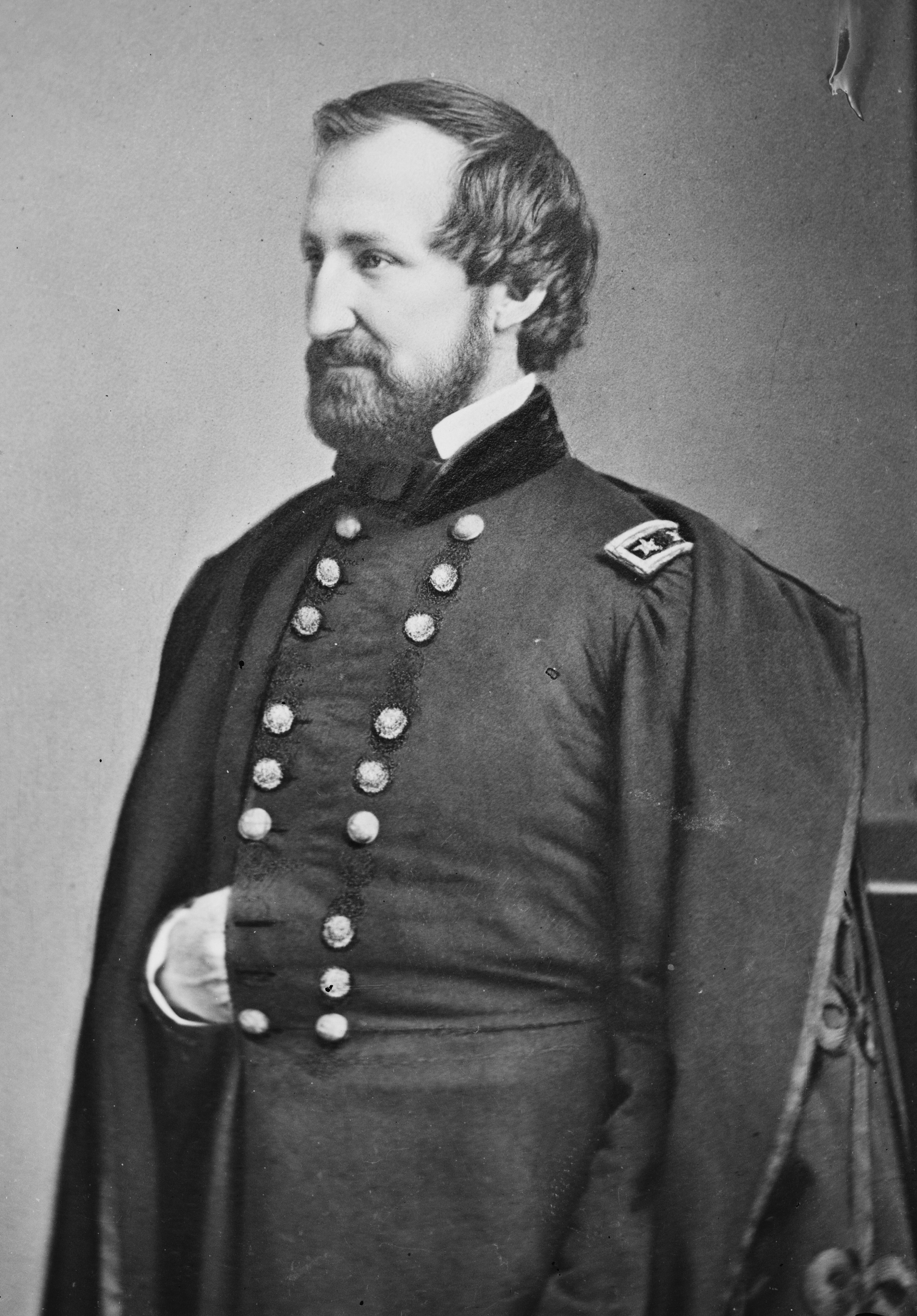
Maj. Gen.
William Rosecrans

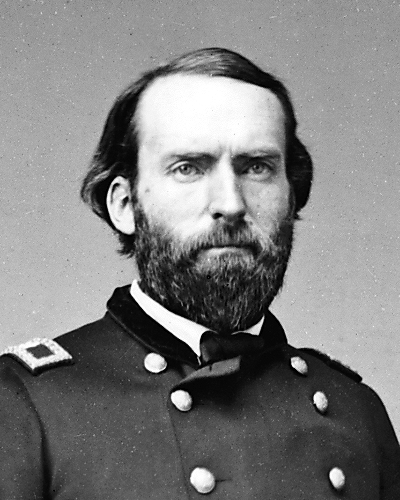
Brig. Gen.
David S. Stanley

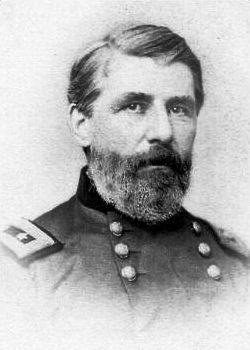
Brig. Gen.
Charles S. Hamilton

Rosecrans' Union Army of the Mississippi fielded approximately 4,500 men, organized as follows:

- Division of Brig. Gen. David S. Stanley included the brigades of Cols. John W. Fuller and Joseph A. Mower.
- Division of Brig. Gen. Charles S. Hamilton included the brigades of Col. John B. Sanborn and Brig. Gen. Jeremiah C. Sullivan.
- Cavalry division of Col. John K. Mizner.

Edward Ord's two divisions did not participate in the main fighting at Iuka.

=== Confederate ===
Principal Confederate commanders
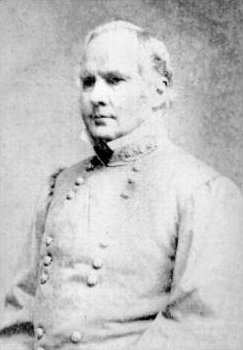
Maj. Gen.
Sterling Price

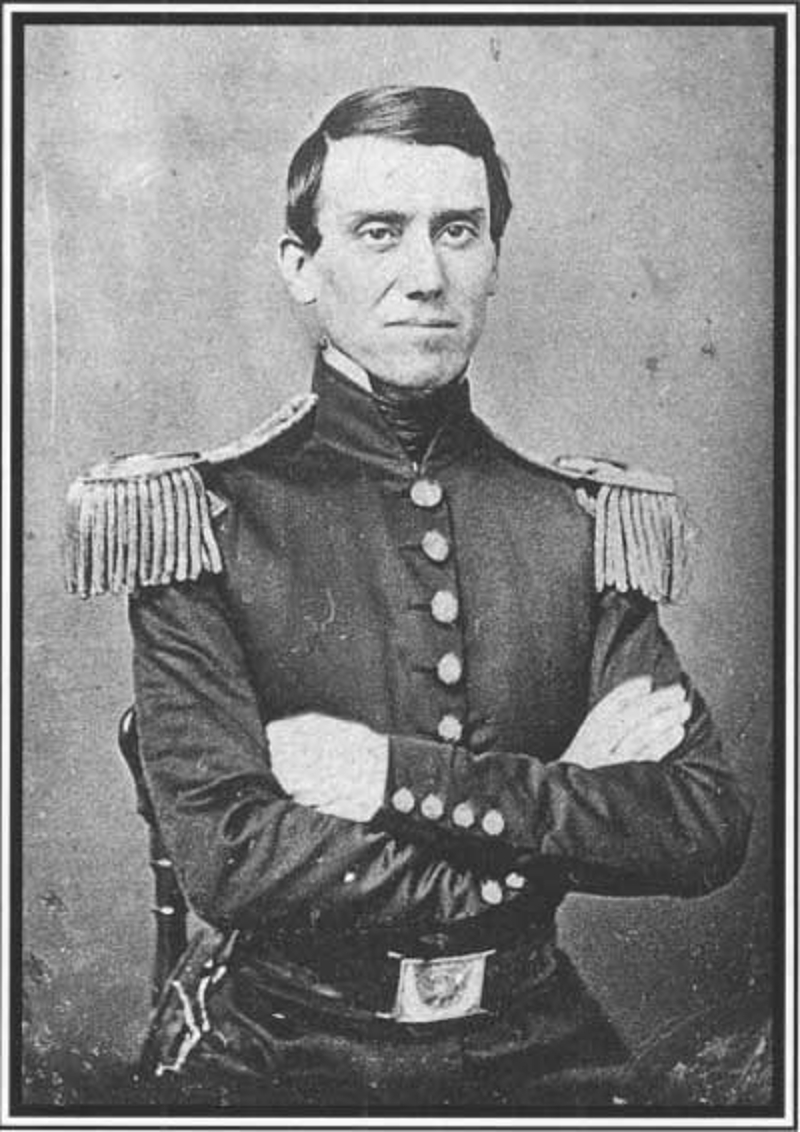
Brig. Gen.
Lewis Henry Little

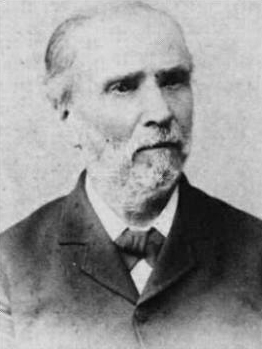
Brig. Gen.
Louis Hébert

Price's Confederate Army of the West engaged at Iuka amounted to 3,179 men. It was organized as follows:

- Division of Brig. Gen. Lewis Henry Little included the brigades of Cols. Elijah Gates and John D. Martin, and Brig. Gens. Louis Hébert and Martin E. Green.
- Cavalry brigade of Brig. Gen. Frank C. Armstrong.

== Battle ==
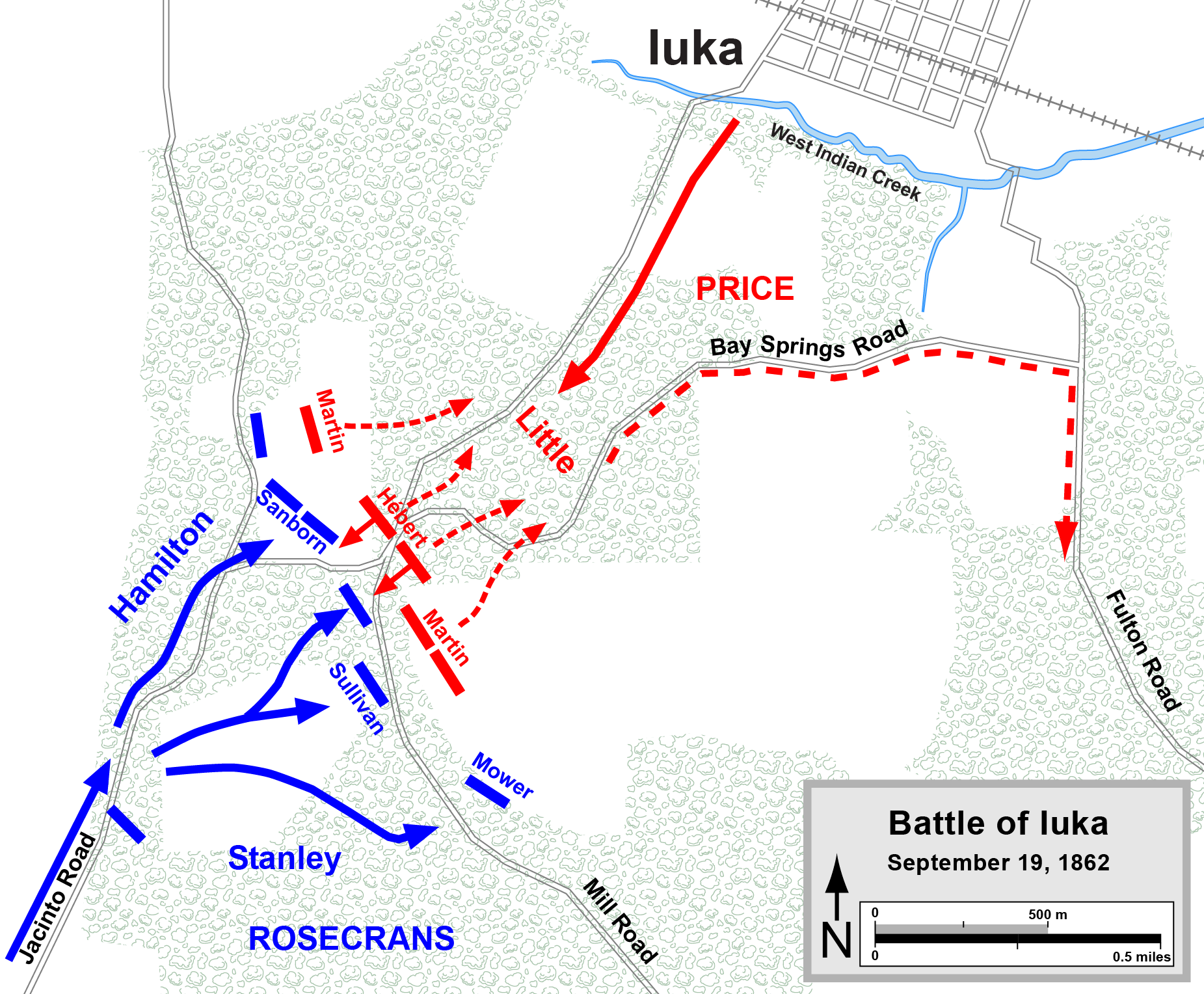
Battle of Iuka

Ord advanced toward Iuka on the night of September 18 and skirmishing ensued between his reconnaissance patrol and Confederate pickets, about six miles (9.7 km) from Iuka, before nightfall. Rosecrans was late, having farther to march over roads mired in mud; furthermore, one of his divisions took a wrong turn and had to countermarch to the correct road. On the night of September 18, he notified Grant that he was 20 miles away, but planned to start marching again at 4:30 a.m. and should reach Iuka by midafternoon on September 19. Considering this delay, Grant ordered Ord to move within 4 miles of the town, but to await the sound of fighting between Rosecrans and Price before engaging the Confederates. Ord demanded that the Confederates surrender, but Price refused. Price received dispatches from Van Dorn suggesting that their two armies rendezvous at Rienzi for attacks on the Union Army forces in the area, so Price ordered his men to prepare for a march the next day. Rosecrans' army marched early on September 19, but instead of using two roads as originally planned—the Jacinto and Fulton Roads, approaching Iuka from the southwest and southeast—it followed only the Jacinto Road. Rosecrans was concerned that if he used both roads, the halves of his divided force could not realistically support each other if the Confederates attacked.

Rosecrans was within two miles (3.2 km) of the town on September 19, pushing back Confederate pickets, when his lead element, Sanborn's brigade, was struck suddenly by Little's Confederate division at 4:30 p.m., on the Mill Road, near the forks of the Jacinto Road and the crossroads leading from it to Fulton (sometimes referred to as the Bay Springs Road). Hamilton deployed his force to the best advantage, his artillery being posted on the only suitable ground. Col. Mizner with a battalion of the 3rd Michigan Cavalry was sent out on the right and the 10th Iowa Infantry and a section of the 11th Ohio Battery formed the left.

Hébert's brigade (five infantry regiments, supported by cavalry) moved forward on the Ohio battery around 5:15 p.m., and although met by a volley from the entire Federal line at 100 yards (91 m), it succeeded in reaching the battery before being repulsed twice. On the third attempt the Confederates drove off the gunners and compelled the 48th Indiana to fall back upon the 4th Minnesota. (The 11th Ohio lost 46 of their 54 gunners and three of their four officers. Although the Confederates had captured all six guns of the battery, they were unable to take advantage of them, because all of the horses had been killed in the fighting.) At this time Stanley's division was brought into the action. The 11th Missouri was placed to the right and rear of the 5th Iowa, where it repulsed a last desperate attack of two Mississippi brigades. Fighting, which Price later stated he had "never seen surpassed," continued until after dark. A fresh north wind, blowing from Ord's position in the direction of Iuka, caused an acoustic shadow that prevented the sound of the guns from reaching him, and he and Grant knew nothing of the engagement until after it was over. Ord's troops stood idly while the fighting raged only a few miles away.

== Aftermath ==
I cannot speak too highly of the energy and skill displayed by General Rosecrans in the attack, and of the endurance of the troops under him. General Ord's command showed untiring zeal, but the direction taken by the enemy prevented them from taking the active part they desired.

— Grant's first report of the battle, September 20, 1862.

If it was the object of the enemy to make their way into Kentucky, they were defeated in that; if to hold their position until Van Dorn could come up on the southwest of Corinth and make a simultaneous attack, they were defeated in that. Our only defeat was in not capturing the enemy army or destroying it as I had hoped to do. It was a part of General Hamilton's command that did the fighting, directed entirely by that cool and deserving officer.

— Grant's second report of the battle, October 22, 1862.

During the night both Rosecrans and Ord deployed their forces in the expectation of a renewal of the engagement at daylight, but the Confederate forces had withdrawn. Price had been planning this move since September 18 and Rosecrans' attack merely delayed his departure. The Confederates used the Fulton Road, which the Union army had not blocked, protecting their rear with a heavy rearguard. Stanley shelled the town, driving out a number of stragglers. He and Rosecrans' cavalry pushed on in pursuit of Price for 15 miles, but owing to the exhausted condition of his troops, his column was outrun and he gave up the pursuit. Price's force met up with Van Dorn's army in Ripley five days later. The united Confederates under Van Dorn attacked Corinth on October 3–4.

The Union casualties at Iuka were 790 (144 killed, 598 wounded, 40 captured or missing); the Confederates lost 594 (85 killed, 400 wounded, 109 captured or missing). The most senior casualty was Confederate General Little, who was struck in the eye by a bullet while accompanying Price. Among the ordnance stores abandoned by the Confederates were 1,629 stand of arms, a large stock of quartermaster and commissary stores, and 13,000 rounds of ammunition. Grant had partially accomplished his objective—Price was not able to link up with Bragg in Kentucky, but Rosecrans had not been able to destroy the Confederate army or prevent it from linking up with Van Dorn and threatening the critical railroad junction at Corinth.

The Battle of Iuka marked the beginning of a long professional enmity between Rosecrans and Grant. The Northern press gave accounts very favorable to Rosecrans at Grant's expense. Some rumors circulated that the reason Ord's column did not attack in conjunction with Rosecrans was not that the battle was inaudible, but that Grant was drunk and incompetent. Grant's first report of the battle was highly complimentary of Rosecrans, but his second, written after Rosecrans had published his own report, took a markedly negative turn. His third statement was in his Personal Memoirs, where he wrote "I was disappointed at the result of the battle of Iuka—but I had so high an opinion of General Rosecrans that I found no fault at the time."

== Battlefield preservation ==
- Iuka Battlefield
- U.S. National Register of Historic Places
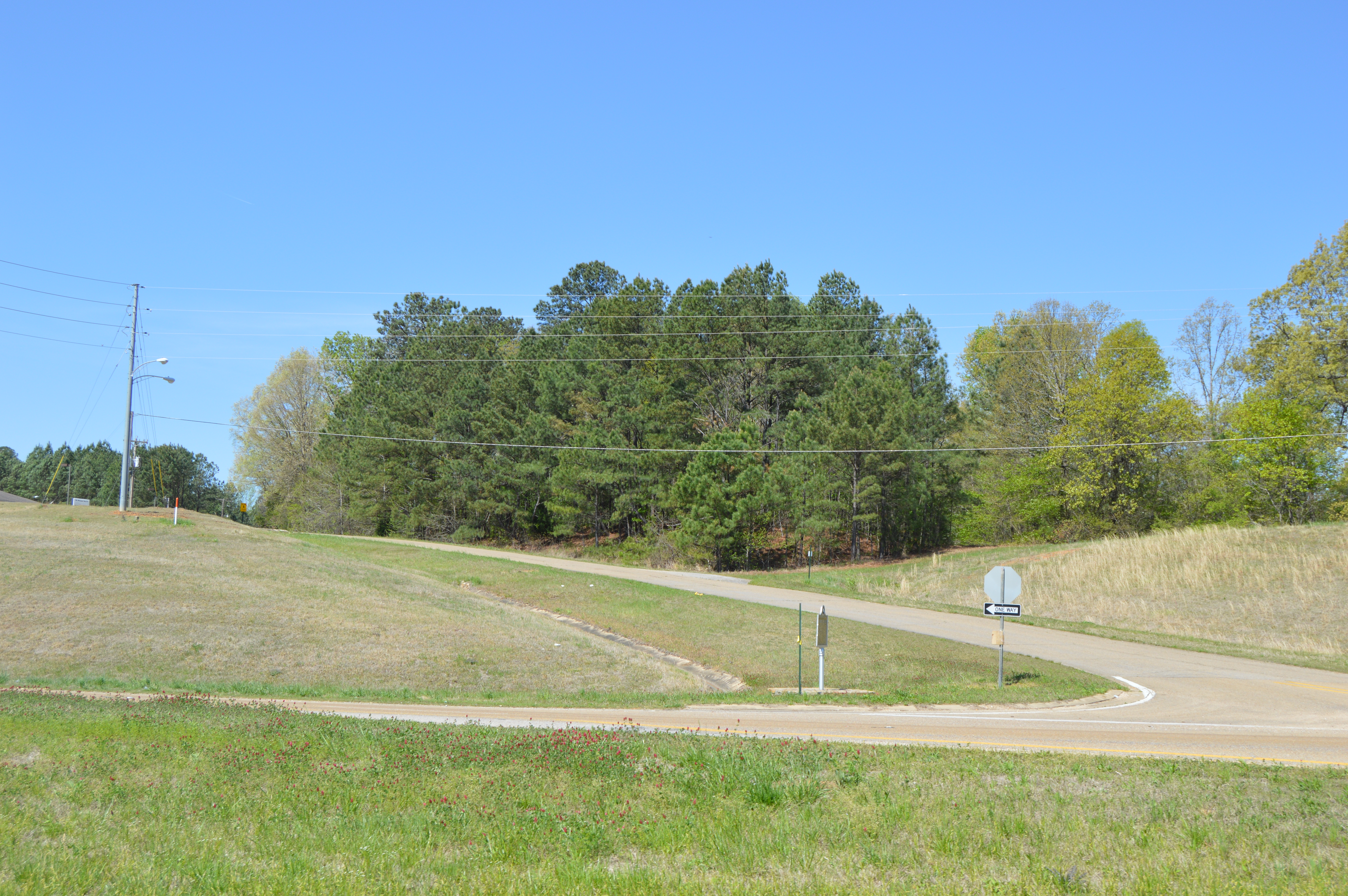
- Iuka Battlefield in 2014
- Location: N of MS 72, W of MS 25, Iuka, Mississippi
- Area: 70 acres (28 ha)
- Built: 1862
- NRHP reference No.: 07001184
- Added to NRHP: November 14, 2007

=== Historic site ===
The battlefield site was added to the National Register of Historic Places on November 14, 2007. The site was open forest and cleared farm land in 1862, but is now largely covered by thick woods and undergrowth. There are no remaining buildings from the time of the battle. The Goyer Cemetery still exists and was near the center of the Union line, though most of the grave markers are gone. The present-day Highway 25 approximates the location of the Jacinto Road used by Rosecrans' Union forces to move north into a defensive position southwest of Iuka.

=== Land acquisition ===
The American Battlefield Trust and its partners have acquired and preserved 58 acres (0.23 km^{2}) of the Iuka battlefield as of mid-2023.

== See also ==
- List of American Civil War battles
- Troop engagements of the American Civil War, 1862
- List of costliest American Civil War land battles
