= 1st Arkansas Consolidated Infantry Regiment =

Confederate Army infantry regiment of the American Civil War

- Active: 1864–1865
- Disbanded: May 26, 1865
- Country: Confederate States
- Allegiance: Arkansas
- Branch: Army
- Type: Infantry
- Size: Regiment
- Facings: Light blue
- Engagements: American Civil War

Commanders
- Notable commanders: Col. Jordan E. Cravens

The 1st Arkansas Consolidated Infantry (1864–1865) was a Confederate States Army infantry regiment during the American Civil War. The regiment is separate from and has no connection with the 1st Arkansas Consolidated Infantry Regiment which was formed in the Confederate Army of Tennessee in April 1865 and is also separate from the 1st Regiment, Arkansas State Troops, which became the 15th (Josey's) Arkansas Infantry Regiment and Fagan's 1st Arkansas Infantry Regiment, which was formed in 1861 and served in the Army of Tennessee.

== Formation ==
In September 1864, the remnants of several Arkansas Infantry Regiments in the Trans-Mississippi Department were consolidated. There is some evidence that this consolidation may have occurred as a field consolidation as early as May 1864. The 1st Arkansas Consolidated Infantry Regiment (Trans-Mississippi) was created by combining the following depleted regiments:

- 14th Arkansas Infantry Regiment (Powers').
- 15th (Northwest) Arkansas Infantry Regiment.
- 16th Arkansas Infantry Regiment.
- 21st Arkansas Infantry Regiment.

Colonel Jordan E. Cravens was selected to command the new consolidate regiment. All of these regiments had been captured at the either the Siege of Vicksburg or Port Hudson and exchanged back in Arkansas.

The consolidated regiment was assigned along with the 2nd Arkansas Consolidated Infantry Regiment and 3rd Arkansas Consolidated Infantry Regiments to the 2nd (McNair's) Arkansas Brigade, 1st (Churchill's) Arkansas Division, 2nd Corps, Trans-Mississippi Department,

== Service ==
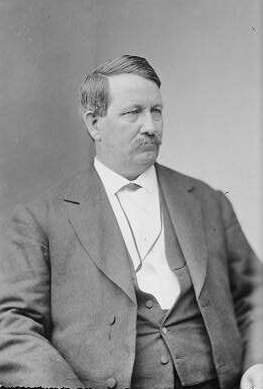
Jordan E. Cravens

On September 30, 1864 the 1st Arkansas Consolidated Infantry was assigned to Brigadier General Evander McNair's 2nd (Arkansas) Brigade, Acting Major General Thomas J. Churchill’s 1st (Arkansas) Division, Major General John B. Magruder’s Second Army Corps, Army of the Trans-Mississippi and remained in that assignment through December 31, 1864. In mid October, 1864, Brigadier General McNair was the Acting Division Commander, with Division headquarters at Camden, Arkansas. On 17 November 1864, a union spy reported that the McNair's Brigade and Churhill's Division was in the vicinity of Camden, in Ouachita County, Arkansas. On 31 December 1864, General Kirby Smith's report on the organization of his forces lists the regiment, under the command of Lieutenant Colonel William W. Reynolds as still belonging to Brigadier General Evander McNair's, 2nd Brigade of Acting Major General Thomas J. Churchill's 1st Arkansas Infantry Division of Major General John B. Magruder's 2nd Army Corps, Confederate Army of the Trans-Mississippi.

On 22 January 1865, Major General Churchill was ordered to move his division to Minden, Louisiana, and occupy winter quarters. On 23 January 1865, Major General Churchill sent a dispatch to Colonel Hawthorn at Dooley's Ferry and directed his movement to Minden, Louisiana.

Union commanders in the Department of the Gulf reported on March 20, 1865 that General McNair's brigade was composed of the 1st, 2nd and 3rd Consolidated Regiments, Commanded by Colonels Cravens, Ried, and Williams respectively and that the regiments were made up of paroled prisoners from Vicksburg and Port Hudson. The report provided their location as Minden, Louisiana, with the rest of Churchill's Division. In early April 1865, the division concentrated near Shreaveport Louisiana, and then moved to Marshall, Texas by mid April 1865.

This regiment surrendered with the Department of the Trans-Mississippi, General E. Kirby Smith commanding, May 26, 1865. When the Trans-Mississippi Department surrendered, all of the Arkansas infantry regiments were encamped in and around Marshall, Texas (war-ravaged Arkansas no longer able to subsist the army). The regiments were ordered to report to Shreveport, Louisiana, to be paroled. None of them did so. Some soldiers went to Shreveport on their own to be paroled, but the regiments simply disbanded without formally surrendering. A company or two managed to keep together until they got home. For example, Company G, 35th Arkansas Infantry Regiment, traveled back to Van Buren, Arkansas where they surrendered to the U.S. post commander in a formal ceremony, drawn up in front of the court-house, laying down their weapons, etc. But for the most part, the men simply went home. Many of the Arkansas Cavalry units, which had largely been furloughed for the winter of 1864-1865 following Price's disastrous Missouri Expedition did formally surrender at Jacksonport, Wittsburg, and a few other locations.

== See also ==
- List of Confederate units from Arkansas
- Confederate Units by State
