= Army of the West (1862) =

Field army of the Confederate States

- Flag
- Active: March–September 1862
- Disbanded: September 28, 1862
- Country: Confederate States
- Branch: Army
- Size: Field army
- Battles: American Civil War; Battle of Elk Horn; Battle of Farmington; Battle of Iuka

Commanders
- Commanding officers: Earl Van Dorn; John P. McCown; Dabney H. Maury; Sterling Price

The Army of the West was a field army of the Confederate States in the Trans-Mississippi and Western theaters of the American Civil War. It participated in the battles of Elk Horn, Farmington, and Iuka before being merged with troops from the Department of Southern Mississippi and East Louisiana to form the Army of West Tennessee on September 28, 1862.

== History ==
=== Battle of Elk Horn ===
During 1861, Confederate forces in Missouri and Arkansas were divided into two independent commands: Major General Sterling Price's pro–Confederate Missouri State Guard, based in southwestern Missouri, and Major General Benjamin McCulloch's Confederate volunteers, based in northwestern Arkansas and the Indian Territory. Both Price and McCulloch feuded with each other concerning the proper Confederate strategy in the Trans–Mississippi area, and cooperated only once, during the Wilson's Creek campaign in August 1861. During February 1862, the Union Army of the Southwest commanded by Brigadier General Samuel R. Curtis drove the Missouri State Guard out of the state and into northwestern Arkansas, where Price united with McCulloch's forces. The Confederates settled into winter quarters in the northern Boston Mountains, where Price immediately started feuding with McCulloch again. Price also started the process of enlisting his men from the Missouri State Guard into the Confederate volunteer army but the process was slow and only one brigade was organized onto complete regiments by March; another brigade was composed only of battalions and a third of partial organized battalions and companies.

To solve the problem of having two feuding commanders in Arkansas, Confederate President Jefferson Davis appointed Major General Earl Van Dorn to command the District of the Trans–Mississippi, which covered Missouri, Arkansas, the Indian Territory, and northern Louisiana; the district was part of the Confederate Department No. 2, commanded by General Albert Johnston. Once he arrived in Arkansas, Van Dorn designated each command a division and enlisted additional troops, organizing them into the 19th and 20th Arkansas Infantry regiments. He also ordered Brigadier General Albert Pike to bring his brigade from the Indian Territory to Arkansas but only two regiments (the 1st and 2nd Cherokee Mounted Rifles) reached Van Dorn's army before the campaign started.

Van Dorn launched his offensive on March 5; when he discovered that Curtis was positioned behind fortifications located along the Little Sugar Creek, Van Dorn decided to march around the Union left flank and attack from the rear, starting the flanking march during the night of March 6–7. There was a delay as the Confederates had to construct a bridge over the Little Sugar Creek; by morning Price's division arrived at the Telegraph Road north of Curtis's fortifications, with McCulloch behind him and a rocky ridge called Big Mountain between the Confederates and the Union army. At this time, McCulloch received permission to head around the southern shoulder of Big Mountain and meet up with Price near Elk Horn Tavern, since this would shorten the distance he would travel. However, a portion of the Union army, commanded by Brigadier General Franz Sigel intercepted McCulloch's men near the southwest corner of Big Mountain. While an attack by Pike's brigade and Brigadier General James McIntosh's cavalry brigade drove back the Union forces from their initial positions, McCulloch was killed while scouting the second Union line, McIntosh was killed while leading a regiment into position, and Union reinforcements routed McCulloch's infantry brigade and captured its leader, Colonel Louis Hebert. Pike was able to rally a portion of the division and lead it back to the Bentonville Detour, where it marched around the northern end of Big Mountain and to Elk Horn Tavern. Colonel Elkanah Greer of the 3rd Texas Cavalry took command of another portion of the division and, after holding his position until after dark, also marched around Big Mountain to the tavern.

Meanwhile, Price's force, accompanied by Van Dorn, arrived near Elk Horn Tavern to find Colonel Eugene Carr's Union division defending the crest. Price deployed the State Guard on his left and the Missouri Confederate brigades on the right; following an artillery bombardment, he ordered a charge. The Confederates were able to drive back the Union line and capture a cannon but couldn't rout Carr's division; one of Price's brigade commanders was killed and Price himself was wounded twice but not seriously enough to leave the field. During the night, the remains of McCulloch's division arrived at Elk Horn Tavern but no supplies came, since the supply train was located several miles away at the initial Confederate positions and Van Dorn failed to order it to follow the army; as a result, the Confederates were low on ammunition.

Curtis concentrated his army around the Confederate positions near Elk Horn Tavern during the night; at dawn he started an artillery bombardment which lasted two hours. Due to having no ammunition reserves nearby, the Confederates soon ran very low on artillery shells and couldn't resupply for at least five or six hours. Van Dorn ordered his army to retreat towards the east before moving southwards. Neither Van Dorn nor Price remained behind to supervise the retreat, so the units left the field chaotically, with the artillery batteries leaving as they ran out of ammunition and the infantry and cavalry regiments following.

Once the army arrived at Van Buren, Van Dorn reorganized it into a single division under Price, with four infantry brigades, two cavalry brigades, and an artillery brigade. At this time, General P. G. T. Beauregard, acting for Johnston, ordered Van Dorn to bring his army to Corinth, Mississippi to join Johnston's force for an attack on the Union army at Shiloh. However, due to bad roads Van Dorn failed to reach Corinth until a week after the Battle of Shiloh; in addition, Van Dorn brought all supplies he could, including the machinery and stores at the Little Rock arsenal, to northern Mississippi with him, and left few men behind.

=== Battle of Iuka ===
Following the transfer of the Army of the West to Corinth, part of the army was incorporated into the Army of Mississippi. The remaining units were reorganized by Price into two divisions commanded by Brigadier Generals Henry Little and Dabney Maury, with a cavalry brigade commanded by Colonel Frank Armstrong. As part of the preparations for the Perryville campaign, the new commander of Department No. 2, General Braxton Bragg, divided Mississippi into several commands to defend the state in his absence. Van Dorn was appointed commander of the District of the Mississippi, centered around Vicksburg; Price was given the District of the Tennessee, covering northwestern Mississippi and northeastern Alabama, with the Army of the West as his field army. Price was ordered to hold the Mobile and Ohio Railroad and prevent the Union forces in western Tennessee, commanded by U. S. Grant and William S. Rosecrans, from reinforcing the Union army in Kentucky, with Van Dorn to cooperate with Price. Initially, Van Dorn refused to unite his force with Price's, instead concentrating on recapturing Baton Rouge, Louisiana; when that attack failed, Van Dorn reconsidered Price's proposal of invading the Union held territory.

In the meantime, Price launched an offensive without waiting for Van Dorn's forces, mostly due to pressure from Bragg. He captured without a fight the town of Iuka on September 14, along with many supplies abandoned by the Union garrison. Grant and Rosecrans immediately formed a plan of trapping Price, with Grant moving in from the northwest to hold Price's attention, while Rosecrans attacked from the south and southwest to cut off Price's lines of retreat. The two columns reached Iuka on September 19 but due to poor communications and misunderstanding, Grant failed to attack as planned. This enabled Price to concentrate on Rosecrans, resulting in the Battle of Iuka; the Confederates overpowered the initial Union line and held it against Union counterattacks. Upon learning of Grant's approach, Price decided to retreat to avoid being surrounded; total Confederate casualties were 652, with Little killed and succeeded by Brigadier General Louis Hebert.

Uniting with Van Dorn at Ripley, Mississippi on September 28, Price placed himself under Van Dorn's command. The Army of the West was redesignated Price's Corps, which with Mansfield Lovell's division from the District of the Mississippi, formed Van Dorn's Army of West Tennessee. (Lovell's division remained separate from Price's corps and reported directly to Van Dorn.) Van Dorn then informed Price of his plans to capture Corinth: first the Confederates would march to Pocahontas, northwest of Corinth, in order to confuse the Union high command, then turn around and attack Corinth from the north and northwest. Although opposed to the plan, Price went along with it. During the two‑day Battle of Corinth, Price's corps did much of the fighting. On the first day, Price's troops drove the Union troops from their lines north of Corinth into their second line of fortifications; on the second, his divisions overran several parts of the Union line and briefly entered into Corinth but had to fall back due to lack of support. Hebert reported himself sick on the morning of the second day and was replaced by Brigadier General Martin E. Green; in addition, several field officers were killed or wounded during the battle. During both days, Lovell failed to fully support Price's attacks, which may have been due to his opposition to attacking Corinth at all.

Van Dorn ordered a retreat first towards Pocahontas, where he proposed for the Confederate army to attack Corinth again from the south; both Price and Maury talked him out of it. The retreat continued westward, with Lovell's division serving as a rearguard against Rosecrans and Price's divisions in front. On the morning of October 6, Van Dorn learned that another Union force commanded by Stephen Hulbut was approaching from the west; he assigned Maury's division to hold the Davis Bridge over the Hatchie River until the army could reach another crossing six miles to the south. Maury formed a line on the west side of the creek but the line was overrun with the loss of 300 prisoners. Hulbut then crossed several regiments to the east bank, which suffered 570 casualties, mostly due to sharpshooters and artillery fire. Once a temporary bridge was built across the Hatchie, the Confederate army retreated to Holly Springs.

Price's force lost 35 percent of its strength, with most of the casualties in Maury's division (2,500 men out of 3,900, with another 600 desertions during the retreat). Both Price's and Van Dorn's districts were merged into the Department of Mississippi and East Louisiana, commanded by Lieutenant General John C. Pemberton, who took over the Army of West Tennessee. Price was reassigned to the Trans-Mississippi Department in February 1863 but the Missouri regiments were not transferred with him as he had requested.

== Commanding officers ==
- Earl Van Dorn (March–June 1862)
- John P. McCown (June 1862)
- Dabney H. Maury (June–July 1862)
- Sterling Price (July–September 1862)
