= 15th (Northwest) Arkansas Infantry Regiment =

Infantry regiment of the Confederate States Army

15th Arkansas Infantry Regiment
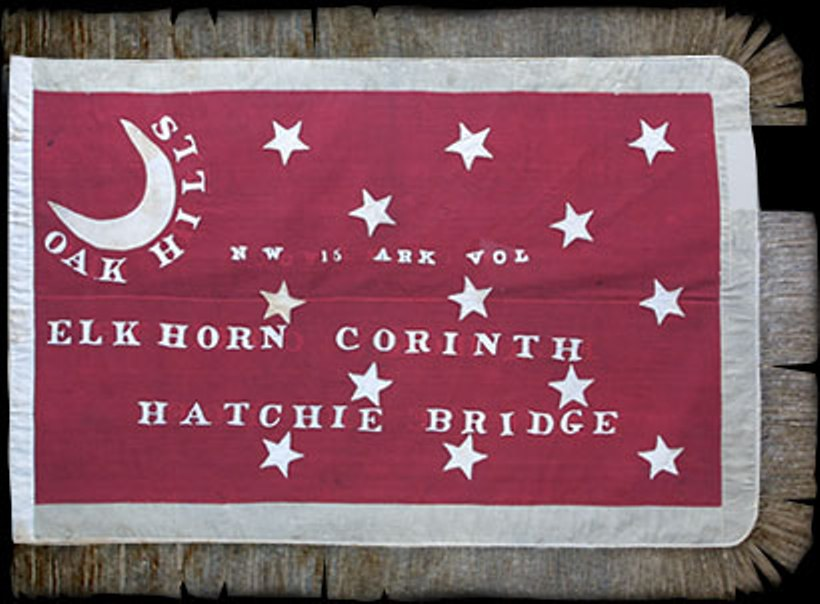
- Regimental color of the Northwest Regiment at the Old State House Museum in Little Rock, Arkansas
- Active: 1861–1865
- Disbanded: May 26, 1865
- Country: Confederate States
- Allegiance: Arkansas
- Branch: Army
- Type: Infantry
- Size: Regiment
- Nickname: "Northwest regiment"
- Facings: Light blue
- Battles: American Civil War; Battle of Oak Hills; Battle of Elk Horn; Battle of Corinth; Battle of Hatchie Bridge; Battle of Grand Gulf; Battle of Port Gibson; Battle of Champion Hill; Battle of Black River Bridge; Siege of Vicksburg (surrendered)
- Battle honors: Oak Hills; Elk Horn; Corinth; Hatchie Bridge

The 15th Arkansas Infantry Regiment, also known as the "Northwest regiment", was an infantry formation of the Confederate States Army during the American Civil War. It was originally formed as the 3rd Arkansas Infantry Battalion. After receiving the requisite ten companies, the battalion was redesignated as the 21st Arkansas Infantry Regiment. Upon discovery that there was already another "21st Arkansas," the Northwest Regiment was again redesignated as the 15th Arkansas Infantry Regiment. This was the third Arkansas regiment to bear the designation "15th Arkansas." The others are Johnson's and Josey's Arkansas infantry regiments. Members of the Northwest Regiment fought both west and east of the Mississippi River before participating in the Vicksburg campaign, surrendering at Vicksburg in July 1863. After being paroled and exchanged, the regiment was consolidated with other state units to form the 1st Consolidated Arkansas Infantry Regiment.

== Formation ==
The 15th Arkansas Infantry Regiment was formed from four companies of Arkansas State Troops from Benton, Franklin and Yell counties, which marched to Bentonville in July 1861 to be assigned to a regiment of Arkansas State Troops. Instead, they were intercepted by Brigadier General Ben McCulloch, commanding Confederate forces in northwest Arkansas, organized into a battalion under command of Lieutenant Colonel Dandridge McRae, and mustered directly into the service of the Confederate States on July 15, 1861. Brigadier General McCulloch intended to increase the battalion to a regiment. He already had two Arkansas regiments enrolled in Confederate service, the 1st and 2nd Arkansas Mounted Rifles, and McRae's outfit was to form the basis for a 3rd Arkansas Regiment so it was named as the 3rd Battalion Arkansas Infantry.

- Company A – Commanded by Capt. James H. Hobbs, of Benton County.
- Company B – Commanded by Capt. Edward B. Knott, of Franklin County.
- Company C – Commanded by Capt. David A. Stuart, of Franklin County.
- Company D – Commanded by Capt. Joshua L. Hollowell, of Yell County.

It appears that a volunteer militia company, known as the "Johnson County Lancers", Commanded by Capt. Bastion Whitehurst Cox, raised from the 10th Regiment, Arkansas State Militia, of Johnson Country was also assigned to Lt Col McRea's battalion during the Wilson's Creek Campaign. This company apparently disbanded after Wilson's Creek and did not become a part of the 15th Arkansas (Northwest).

The original Field and Staff Officers were:

- Lieutenant Colonel Dandridge McRae.
- Major William Thompson.
- Assistant Commissary, Captain Henry J. Hays.
- Adjutant Squire Boone.
- Commissary Sergeant Edward T. Dorton.
- Quartermaster Sergeant R.M. Lewis.
- Assistant Surgeon James Morrow.

The field officers were Colonels Squire Boone, James H. Hobbs, and Dandridge McRae; Lieutenant Colonel William W. Reynolds; and Majors D. A. Stuart and William Thompson.

== History ==
The unit took an active part in the battles at Wilson's Creek on August 10, 1861, then marched to Camp Jackson, Arkansas, and where it was stationed and continued to drill from September 1, 1861, until the middle of October 1861. The regiment was then ordered to Missouri, moving through Carthage and by a circuitous route returned Arkansas about the November 1, 1861.

In November 1861, four new companies from Benton, Pope and Washington counties joined the 3rd Arkansas Battalion, making a total of eight, so Brigadier General McCulloch asked the Confederate War Department to authorize the battalion to be designated as a regiment, promising that the last two companies would shortly be added. Brigadier General McCulloch's designation of McRae's command as the 3rd Arkansas Regiment was rejected, since Col. Albert Rust's command in Virginia had already been given that designation; so the War Department assigned the designation of 21st Arkansas Infantry Regiment to McRae's command (which resulted in two 21st Arkansas Regiments). The new 21st Arkansas Regiment was officially established on December 3, 1861, at Camp Benjamin, Arkansas.

- Company A – of Benton County, commanded by Captain Paul Graham.
- Company B – of Franklin County, commanded by Captain E. B. Knotts.
- Company C – of Franklin County, commanded by Captain Joseph A. Latimore.
- Company D – of Yell County, commanded by Captain J. L. Hollowell.
- Company E – of Pope County, commanded by Captain Caleb Davis, was originally organized as a volunteer infantry company of the 15th Militia Regiment, Arkansas State Militia on June 24, 1861.
- Company F – of Benton County, commanded by Captain Austin K. Ertis.
- Company G – of Benton County, commanded by Captain William H. Holcomb.
- Company H – of Washington County, Originally Commanded by Captain Pleasant Wilson Buchanan, later commanded by Captain Authur A. Evans.
- Emergency Company I – of Benton County, commanded by Captain Cyrus L. Pickens.

The unit went into winter quarters at Cross Hollows, in Benton County Arkansas, where it remained there until February 20, 1862. went it was ordered to Sugar Creek, Missouri, with the rest the army and formed a junction with General Price's forces. The unit participate in a retreat after various skirmishes arrived back in the Boston Mountains of northwest Arkansas. The unit remained in the mountains until March 3 when it began the movement to attack the Union forces at the Battle of Pea Ridge. The unit participated in the Battle of Pea Ridge on March 11, 1862, as the 21st Arkansas Infantry Regiment. For this battle, a ninth company was temporarily added. Known as Emergency Company I, this company was composed of men from Benton County who enlisted for thirty days of "emergency service". The unit sustained heavy loss and retreated through Fayetteville to Van Buren. The regiment left Van Buren Left there on March 24, 1862, and moved to DesArc, Arkansas. While at DesArc, After the battle of Pea Ridge, the 21st Arkansas and the rest of the Confederate Army of the West was ordered to Mississippi, so the unit moved by steamer to Memphis, Tennessee, and from there marched to Corinth, Mississippi, and on to Rienzi Station, Mississippi, where, on May 8, 1862, the regiment was reorganized for the war.

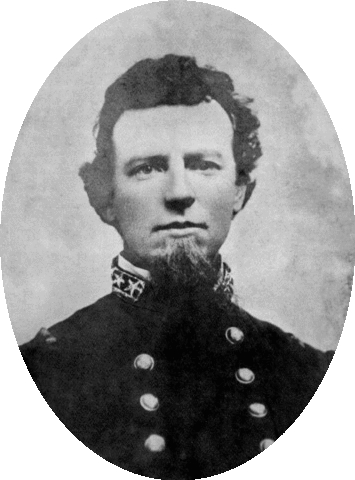
McRae in uniform, c. 1862

In late April and early May 1862 the Confederate Army underwent an army-wide reorganization due to the passage of the Conscription Act by the Confederate Congress in April 1862. All twelve-month regiments had to re-muster and enlist for two additional years or the duration of the war; a new election of officers was ordered; and men who were exempted from service by age or other reasons under the Conscription Act were allowed to take a discharge and go home. Officers who did not choose to stand for re-election were also offered a discharge. The reorganization was accomplished among all the Arkansas regiments in and around Corinth, Mississippi, following the Battle of Shiloh. Colonel McRea chose not to stand for re-election and Lieutenant Colonel James H. Hobbs was elected to succeed McRae as colonel.

Upon reaching Mississippi, many soldiers were listed on the muster rolles as "Dropped as being left west of the Mississippi River". These men were those recovering from wounds received at the Battle at Pea Ridge in March 1862. The reason for this is that by mid-1862 the Union Forces were in control of the Mississippi River above Vicksburg, Mississippi, and there was no hope of those men rejoining their regiment. On May 12, 1862, while still at Corinth, the last two companies (Company I and Company K) were added to the regiment, bringing it up the required ten companies. These new companies had originally been Companies. A and B, respectively, of Williamson's Arkansas Infantry Battalion, recently disbanded.

On August 22, 1862, Colonel Hobbs resigned and Lieutenant Colonel Squire Boone succeeded him as colonel.

- Company I – of Franklin County, commanded by Captain Andrew J. Ransom.
- Company K – of Franklin County, commanded by Captain Alex B. Krider.

During the Iuka-Corinth Campaign, the 21st Arkansas was assigned to Brigadier General John C. Moore's brigade of Brigadier General Dabney H. Maury's Division, of Major General Sterling Price's 1st Corps the Confederate (Army of the West). The unit participated in the Battle of Corinth and Hatchie Bridge.

Sometime after October 1862, the Confederate War Department again redesignated the 21st Arkansas as the 15th Arkansas. The War Department apparently realized its mistake, because in February 1863 the regiment was ordered to insert the word "Northwest" in its regimental designation to distinguish it from, primarily, Colonel Benjamin W. Johnson's regiment, operating in the same theater thus, the 15th (Northwest) Arkansas Regiment.

The newly redesignated 15th Northwest Arkansas was assigned to Brigadier General Martin E. Green's brigade of Major General John S. Bowen's Division, of Lieutenant General John C. Pemberton's Army of Mississippi for the Vicksburg Campaign. When General Green was killed on June 27, 1863, Colonel Dockery of the 19th Arkansas was placed in command of Second Brigade. The Northwest) Regiment sustained 82 casualties at the Battle of Port Gibson and was eventually forced to endure the siege of Vicksburg from May 18 on July 4, 1863. The regiment is entitled to the following campaign participation credit:

- Battle of Oak Hills, Missouri, August 10, 1861.
- Battle of Elkhorn Tavern, Arkansas, March 7–8, 1862.
- Second Battle of Corinth, Mississippi, October 3–4, 1862.
- Battle of Hatchie Bridge, Mississippi, October 5, 1862.
- Battle of Grand Gulf, Mississippi, April 29, 1863.
- Battle of Port Gibson, Mississippi, May 1, 1863.
- Battle of Champion Hill, Mississippi, May 16, 1863.
- Battle of Black River Bridge, Mississippi, May 17, 1863.
- Siege of Vicksburg, Mississippi, May – July, 1863.

This regiment surrendered with the Army of Mississippi at Vicksburg, Mississippi, July 4, 1863. General U. S. Grant initially demanded the conditional surrender of the Vicksburg garrison, but faced with the necessity of feeding 30,000 starving Confederates and having the idea that these soldiers might do more harm to the Confederate cause by being released to return home rather than being exchanged as whole units, he relented and allowed for the immediate parole of the unit. According to the Confederate War Department, Union leader encouraged the surrendered confederates to simply return home, rather than being officially paroled and exchanged. The able bodied Confederate soldiers who were released on parole walked out of Vicksburg (they were not allowed to proceed in any military formations) on July 11, 1863. Paroling of these able bodied men was completed in their respective regimental camps inside Vicksburg prior to the July 11th. The soldiers of the 15th Northwest Arkansas were paroled on July 8 and 9, 1863. Those who were wounded or sick in the various hospitals in Vicksburg were paroled, and were released as soon as they could leave on their own. July 15/16 is the most common date of these Vicksburg hospital paroles. Some of the most seriously wounded and sick were sent by steamship down the Mississippi River and over to Mobile, Alabama, where they were delivered on parole to Confederate authorities.

Confederate commanders designated Enterprise, Mississippi as the rendezvous point (parole camp) for the Vicksburg parolees to report to after they got clear of the last Federal control point at Big Black Bridge. Most of the Arkansas units appeared to have bypassed the established parole camps, and possibly with the support or at least by the compliancy of their Union captors, simply crossed the river and returned home. Because so many of the Vicksburg parolees, especially from Arkansas, simply went home, Major General Pemberton requested Confederate President Davis to grant the men a thirty- to sixty-day furlough. The furloughs were not strictly adhered to so long as the soldier eventually showed up at a parole camp to be declared exchanged and returned to duty. Those who went directly home were treated as if they had been home on furlough if they eventually reported into one of these two parole centers. The exchange declaration reports issued by Colonel Robert Ould in Richmond for various units in the Vicksburg and Port Hudson surrenders began in September 1863 based upon men who actually reported into one of the two parole camps. Pemberton eventually coordinated with the Confederate War Department and Confederate General Kirby Smith, commanding the Department of the Trans-Mississippi to have the Arkansas Vicksburg parolee's rendezvous point established at Camden, Arkansas.

The post-Vicksburg record of the 15th Northwest Arkansas Infantry is almost non-existent. Historians can find no record of the parolees from this regiment reporting to the established parole camps at Enterprise or Demopolis, Mississippi. The regiment was eventually reorganized west of the Mississippi at Washington, Arkansas, but there are no muster rolls available to indicate how men reported for duty. A handful of men seem to have spent at least some time temporarily attached to the Third Missouri (Confederate) Cavalry Battalion. One postwar account indicates that some of the men made their way back to Arkansas individually. But enough men seem to have worked their way back to Washington, Arkansas, to enable the regiment to be reorganized and integrated into the Trans-Mississippi Army and placed back into active service.

After being exchanged, the regiment was consolidated with the 14th and 16th Arkansas Regiments to form the 1st Consolidated Arkansas Infantry Regiment. This regiment surrendered with the Department of the Trans-Mississippi, General E. Kirby Smith commanding, May 26, 1865. When the Trans-Mississippi Department surrendered, all of the Arkansas infantry regiments were encamped in and around Marshall, Texas (war-ravaged Arkansas no longer able to subsist the army). The regiments were ordered to report to Shreveport, Louisiana, to be paroled. None of them did so. Some soldiers went to Shreveport on their own to be paroled, but the regiments simply disbanded without formally surrendering.

== Regimental color ==
Major-General Earl Van Dorn adopted this flag design for the Army of the West in February 1862, citing confusion with the Stars and Stripes. The design bears no resemblance to Union or Confederate standards with its red field, stars to represent the thirteen states, and the yellow crescent to represent Missouri. The regimental color was probably presented to the regiment after the Battle of Hatchie Bridge, Tennessee, on October 5, 1862.

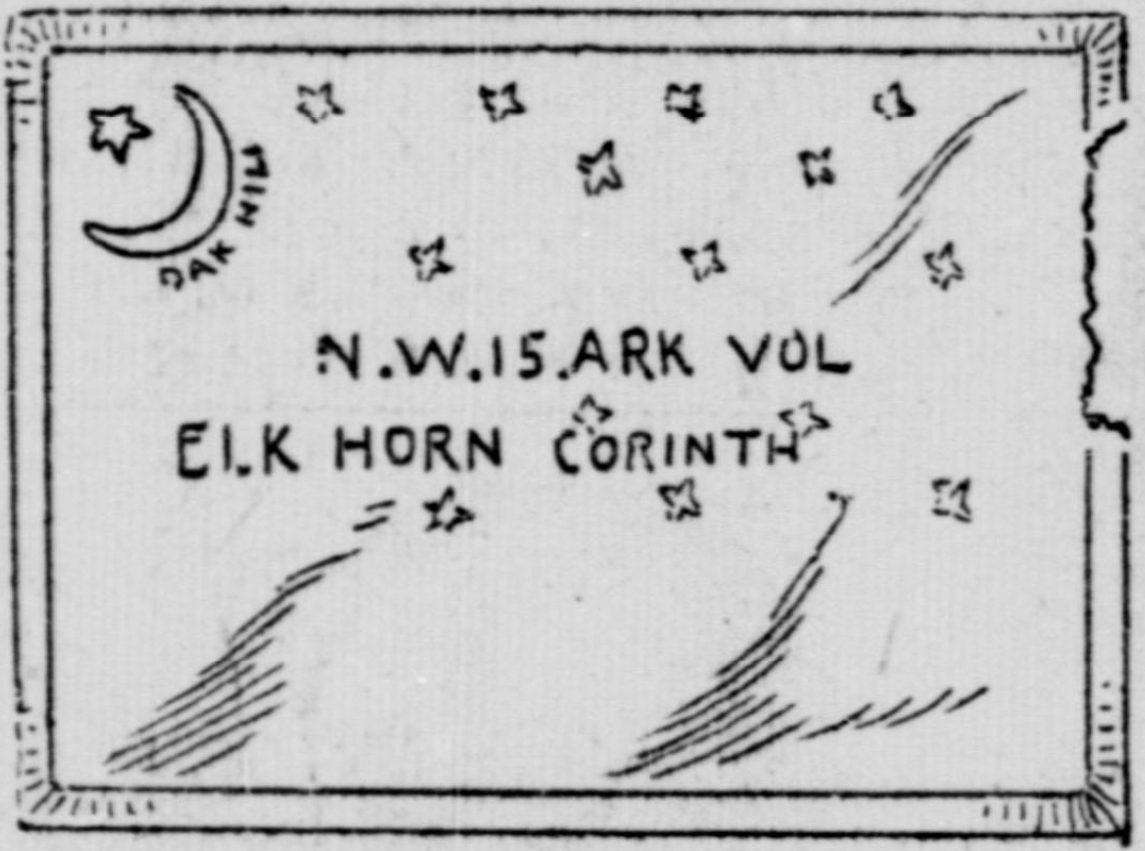
Regimental color captured by union troops on July 4, 1863

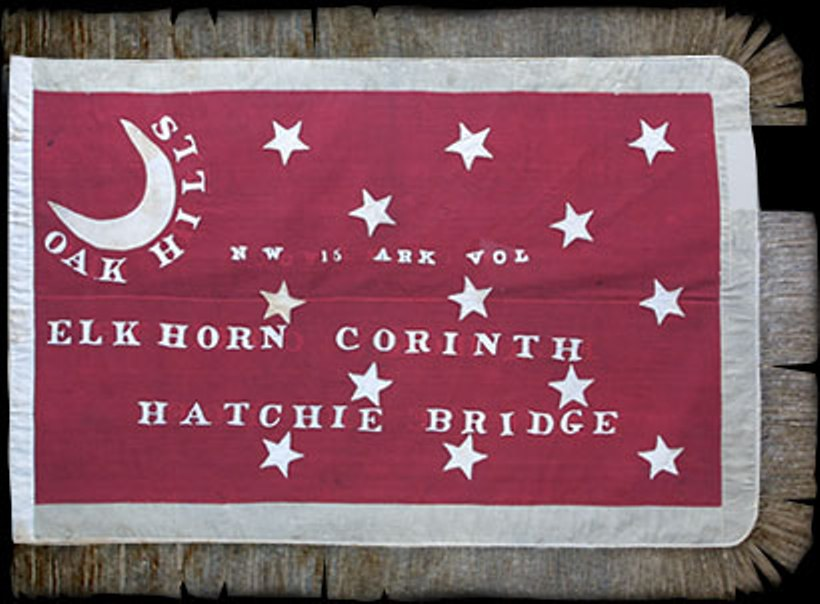
Regimental color of the Northwest Regiment at the Old State House Museum in Little Rock, Arkansas.

The color and its bearer were captured near Port Gibson, Mississippi, on May 1, 1863. It is the only known Van Dorn style flag to carry battle honors and a unit designation. The flag is made of wool, with cotton stars, and silk border, crescent and fringe. It measures 45 1/2" x 68 3/4". It was returned to Arkansas by the State of Indiana. It is currently in the collections of the Old State House Museum in Little Rock, Arkansas.

== See also ==
- List of Confederate units from Arkansas
- Lists of American Civil War Regiments by State
