= Siege of Port Hudson order of battle: Confederate =

The following is the organization of the Confederate forces engaged at the Siege of Port Hudson, during the American Civil War in 1863. The Union order of battle is listed separately.

== Abbreviations used ==
=== Military rank ===
- MG = Major General
- BG = Brigadier General
- Col = Colonel
- Ltc = Lieutenant Colonel
- Maj = Major
- Cpt = Captain
- Lt = 1st Lieutenant
- Sgt Maj = Sergeant Major

== Department of Mississippi & East Louisiana ==
Division	Brigade	Regiments and Others
District of East Louisiana; MG Franklin Gardner	Left Wing Col Isaiah G. W. Steedman	1st Alabama: Col I.G.W. Steedman; 1st Mississippi: Maj Thomas H. Johnston; 39th Mississippi: Col W.B. Shelby; 10th Arkansas Infantry Regiment: Ltc E.L. Vaughan; 15th Arkansas: Col Benjamin Johnson; 18th Arkansas: Col W.N. Parish; Claiborne's Mississippi Light Infantry: Cpt A.J. Lewis; 9th Louisiana Partisan Rangers Battalion: Ltc J.H. Wingfield; 1st Mississippi Light Artillery (Bradford´s and Herod´s batteries); Watson's Louisiana Battery: Lt E.A. Toledano; English's Mississippi Battery: Lt P.J. Noland
District of East Louisiana; MG Franklin Gardner	Center BG William Beall	1st Alabama Infantry: Cpt J.F. Whitfield; 49th Alabama: Col Jeptha Edwards; 1st Arkansas Infantry Battalion: Ltc Batt L. Jones; 12th Arkansas Infantry Regiment: Col T.J. Reid, Jr.; 14th Arkansas Infantry Regiment (Powers'): Ltc Pleasant Fowler; 16th Arkansas Infantry Regiment: Col David Provence; 23rd Arkansas Infantry Regiment: Col O.P. Lyles; 1st Mississippi Infantry: Ltc A.S. Hamilton; 12th Louisiana Artillery Battalion: Ltc P.F. Gournay; 1st Mississippi Light Artillery (Abbay´s battery): George Abbay; 1st Tennessee Light Artillery: Lt Oswald Tilghman; Watson's Louisiana Battery: Sgt Maj H.L. Nichols; 1st Tennessee Heavy Artillery: Cpt James A. Fisher
District of East Louisiana; MG Franklin Gardner	Right Wing Col William R. Miles	9th Louisiana Battalion, Infantry: Cpt Bolling R. Chinn; Miles’ Louisiana Legion: Ltc Frederick Brand; 23rd Arkansas Infantry Regiment: Col O.P. Lyles; Maxey's Brigade (provisional battalion): Col S.A. Whiteside; Boone’s Louisiana Battery: Cpt R.M. Boone; Seven Stars Mississippi Artillery: Cpt Calvit Roberts; DeGournay's Battery: Maj A. Merchant
District of East Louisiana; MG Franklin Gardner	Cavalry Col John L. Logan	11th and 17th Arkansas (detachment): Col John Griffith; 9th Tennessee Battalion: Maj James H. Aiken; Cochran's Battalion; Garland's Battalion: Maj W.H. Garland; Hughes's Battalion: Ltc C.C. Wilbourn; Stockdale's Battalion: Ltc Thomas R. Stockdale; 7 Stars Mississippi Artillery (Robert's battery): Cpt Calvin Roberts

== See also ==
- Louisiana in the American Civil War
