= 2nd Arkansas Consolidated Infantry Regiment =

2nd Arkansas Consolidated Infantry (Confederate)
- Active: 1864–1865
- Disbanded: May 26, 1865
- Country: Confederate States
- Allegiance: Arkansas
- Branch: Army
- Type: Infantry
- Size: Regiment
- Facings: Light blue
- Engagements: American Civil War

The 2nd Arkansas Consolidated Infantry (1864–1865) was a Confederate Army infantry regiment during the American Civil War. The regiment is separate from and has no connection with the 2nd Arkansas Infantry Regiment which served in the Confederate Army of Tennessee and is also separate from the 2nd Regiment, Arkansas State Troops, which participated in the Battle of Wilson's Creek.

== Organization ==
In September 1864, the remnants of several Arkansas Infantry Regiments in the Trans-Mississippi Department which had been captured at either the Siege of Vicksburg or Port Hudson and exchanged were consolidated. There is some evidence that this consolidation may have occurred as a field consolidation as early as May 1864. The 2nd Arkansas Consolidated Infantry Regiment was created by combining the following depleted units:

- 12th Arkansas Infantry Regiment
- 18th Arkansas Infantry Regiment
- 23rd Arkansas Infantry Regiment
- 8th Arkansas Infantry Battalion
- 12th Arkansas Infantry Battalion

Col. Thomas J. Reid, Jr. was selected to command the new consolidate regiment.

=== Final year of service ===
On September 30, 1864 the 2nd Arkansas Consolidated Infantry was assigned to Brigadier General Evander McNair's 2nd (Arkansas) Brigade, Acting Major General Thomas J. Churchill’s 1st (Arkansas) Division, Major General John B. Magruder’s Second Army Corps, Army of the Trans-Mississippi and remained in that assignment through December 31, 1864. On 17 November 1864, a union spy reported that the McNair's Brigade and Churhill's Division was in the vicinity of Camden, in Ouachita County, Arkansas. On 31 December 1864, General Kirby Smith's report on the organization of his forces lists the regiment, under the command of Colonel Thomas J. Ried, Jr. as still belonging to Brigadier General Evander McNair's, 2nd Brigade of Acting Major General Thomas J. Churchill's 1st Arkansas Infantry Division of Major General John B. Magruder's 2nd Army Corps, Confederate Army of the Trans-Mississippi.

On 22 January 1865, Major General Churchill was ordered to move his division to Minden, Louisiana, and occupy winter quarters. On 23 January 1865, Major General Churchill sent a dispatch to Colonel Hawthorn at Dooley's Ferry and directed his movement to Minden, Louisiana.

Union commanders in the Department of the Gulf reported on March 20, 1865 that General McNair's brigade was composed of the 1st, 2nd and 3rd Consolidated Regiments, Commanded by Colonels Cravens, Ried, and Williams respectively and that the regiments were made up of paroled prisoners from Vicksburg and Port Hudson. The report provided their location as Minden, Louisiana, with the rest of Churchill's Division. In early April 1865, the division concentrated near Shreveport, Louisiana, and then moved to Marshall, Texas by mid April 1865.

== Surrender ==
This regiment was surrendered with the Department of the Trans-Mississippi, General Kirby Smith commanding, May 26, 1865.

== See also ==
- List of Confederate units from Arkansas
- Confederate Units by State
