= 18th Arkansas Infantry Regiment =

The 18th Arkansas Infantry Regiment may refer to:

- 18th (Carroll's) Arkansas Infantry Regiment, reorganized and consolidated to form the 2d Consolidated Arkansas Infantry Regiment
- 18th (Marmaduke's) Arkansas Infantry Regiment, redesignated 3d Confederate Infantry Regiment
