= 23rd Arkansas Infantry Regiment =

- Active: 1862–1865
- Disbanded: May 25, 1865
- Country: Confederate States of America
- Allegiance: Arkansas
- Branch: Confederate States Army
- Type: Infantry
- Size: Regiment
- Engagements: American Civil War: Corinth Campaign; Second Battle of Corinth; Siege of Port Hudson; Price's Missouri Raid; Battle of Fort Davidson; Fourth Battle of Boonville; Battle of Glasgow, Missouri; Battle of Sedalia; Second Battle of Lexington; Battle of Little Blue River; Second Battle of Independence; Battle of Byram's Ford; Battle of Westport; Battle of Marais des Cygnes; Battle of Mine Creek; Battle of Marmiton River; Second Battle of Newtonia

Commanders
- Notable commanders: Col. Charles W. Adams

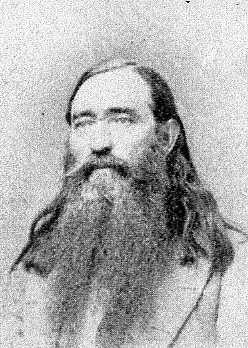
Colonel Charles W. Adams

The 23rd Arkansas Infantry (1862–1865) was a Confederate Army infantry regiment during the American Civil War. In the summer of 1864, the unit was reorganized as a mounted infantry regiment in preparation for Price's Missouri Expedition and officially redesignated as the 42nd Arkansas Infantry (Mounted). The unit was often referred to as Lyle's Arkansas Cavalry in report from Price's Missouri Expedition. Due to its mounted status, the unit is also occasionally referred to as the 23rd Arkansas Cavalry Regiment.

== Organization ==
The 23rd Arkansas Infantry Regiment was organized at Memphis, Tennessee, on April 25, 1862, when Lieutenant-Colonel Charles W. Adams's infantry battalion of five companies was reinforced by the addition of the two companies of Major Simon P. Hughes.s infantry battalion, and Captain Mitchell A. Adair's independent company. All companies were enlisted for twelve months' service. The original field officers were:

- Colonel Charles W. Adams, of Helena.
- Lieutenant-Col. Simon P. Hughes, of Clarendon.
- Major J. S. Robinson, of Chicot County.

The commanders of companies were:

- Company A – commanded by Captain Brown Dolson, of Poinset County.
- Company B – commanded by Captain John Clendenin, of Phillips County.
- Company C – commanded by Captain Seward, of St. Francis County.
- Company D – commanded by Captain E. McAllister, of Crittenden County.
- Company E – commanded by Captain W. W. Smith, of Phillips County.
- Company F – commanded by Captain Simon P. Hughes, of Monroe, and after his election as lieutenant-colonel, Capt. John B. Baxter, of Monroe.
- Company G – commanded by Captain J. H. Robinson, of Chicot county, and after his election as major, Captain Craycraft, of Chicot.
- Company H – commanded by Captain Quency H. Lewis, of Clark County.
- Company I – commanded by Captain A. A. Adair, of Craighead County.
- Company K – commanded by Captain Thomas Westmoreland, of Poinsett County.

The strength of the regiment, at organization, was about 900 men.

== Service ==
The 23rd Arkansas, which was initially identified in Confederate reports as Adams Arkansas Battalion, was initially assigned to Brigadier General Darney H. Maury's Brigade of Major General Samuel Jones' Division of the Army of the West, Major General Earl Van Dorn commanding.

Late April and early May 1862 the Confederate Army underwent an army-wide reorganization due to the passage of the Conscription Act by the Confederate Congress in April 1962. All twelve-month regiments had to re-muster and enlist for three years or the duration of the war; a new election of officers was ordered; and men who were exempted from service by age or other reasons under the Conscription Act were allowed to take a discharge and go home. Officers who did not choose to stand for re-election were also offered a discharge. The 23rd Arkansas Infantry Regiment was reorganized "for 3 years or the war" on May 27, 1862, at Camp Priceville, near Tupelo, Mississippi at which time Capt Thomas L. Westmoreland's independent company was added, bringing the regiment up to full strength.

The regiment reorganized again, pursuant to orders from General Maury, at Saltillo, Mississippi, on September 10, 1862, when the understrength 12th and 14th Arkansas Infantry Regiments were field-consolidated with the 23rd Arkansas Regiment. When the regiment was reorganized the following field officers were elected:

- Colonel Oliver P. Lyles, of Crittenden County.
- Lieutenant Colonel A. H. Pennington, of Clark County.
- Major Erastus L. Black, of Monroe County.
- Adjutant C. W. Lewis, of Crittenden County.
- Quartermaster McMurray, of Chicot County.
- Commissary Norton, of Phillips County.

During the Iuka-Corinth Campaign, the 23rd Arkansas was assigned to Brigadier General John C. Moore's brigade of Brigadier General Dabney H. Maury's Division, of Major General Sterling Price's 1st Corps the Confederate (Army of the West). The unit fought in the battles at Corinth and Hatchie's Bridge and reported 5 killed, 23 wounded, and 116 missing.

Sketch Map of the Port Hudson Fortifications and Morning Assault of May 27, 1863, 6 to 11 AM

Following the Iuka-Corinth Campaign, the regiment was assigned to Brigadier General William Beall's brigade, of Major General Franklin Gardner's Department of Mississippi and East Louisiana and assigned to the garrison of Port Hudson. Due to the unit's losses, it became involved in underwent several field consolidations with other units while assigned to the Department of Mississippi and East Louisiana. Field consolidations were considered to be temporary, and the component regiments continued to maintain separate muster rolls. On January 7, 1863 Major General Franklin Gardner issued General Order No. 5 which temporarily consolidated several under strength Arkansas units:

The troops of this post will be organized into brigades, arranged at the breastworks as follows ... III. Brigadier-General Beall's brigade will consist of the consolidated regiment consisting of the Fourteenth, Sixteenth, Seventeenth, Eighteenth, Twenty-third Arkansas Regiments, and First Arkansas Battalion, commanded by Col. R. H. Crockett; the consolidated regiment consisting of the Eleventh and Fifteenth Arkansas Regiments, commanded by Col. John L. Logan

The order was modified in February 1863 and the 23rd Arkansas was placed in a consolidated regiment with the 14th and 18th Arkansas Infantry Regiments. Logan's consolidated regiment consisted of the 11th and the Griffith's 17th Arkansas. The Johnson's 15th Arkansas was assigned to Crockett's consolidated regiment instead of the 17th.

The regiment endured the forty-eight-day siege, and was surrendered to General Nathaniel P. Banks on July 9, 1863. Following the surrender the officers were sent as prisoners to Johnson's Island Military Prison. The enlisted personnel of the 23rd Arkansas were paroled and returned to Arkansas. After being officially exchanged in the spring of 1864 the unit was converted to mounted infantry and took an active part in Price's Missouri Expedition. When the unit was paroled and exchanged back to Arkansas following its surrender at Port Hudson, a new Company H, from Craighead County, was added to replace the Clark County company, which did not rejoin the regiment after being exchanged.

=== Campaign Credit ===
The unit is credited with participation in the following campaigns and battles:

- Iuka-Corinth Campaign, April–June 1862.
  - Battle of Corinth, October 3–4, 1862.
- Siege of Port Hudson, May–July 1863.
- Price's Missouri Raid, Arkansas-Missouri-Kansas, September–October, 1864.
  - Battle of Fort Davidson, Missouri, September 27, 1864.
  - Fourth Battle of Boonville, Missouri, October 11, 1864.
  - Battle of Glasgow, Missouri, October 15, 1864.
  - Battle of Sedalia, Missouri, October 15, 1864.
  - Second Battle of Lexington, Missouri, October 19, 1864.
  - Battle of Little Blue River, Missouri, October 21, 1864.
  - Second Battle of Independence, Missouri, October 21–22, 1864.
  - Battle of Byram's Ford, Missouri, October 22–23, 1864.
  - Battle of Westport, Missouri, October 23, 1864.
  - Battle of Marais des Cygnes, Linn County, Kansas, October 25, 1864.
  - Battle of Mine Creek, Missouri, October 25, 1864.
  - Battle of Marmiton River, Missouri, October 25, 1864.
  - Second Battle of Newtonia, Missouri, October 28, 1864.

== Surrender ==
Brigadier General M. Jeff Thompson, Commander of the Military Sub-District of Northeast Arkansas and Southeast Missouri, to which the regiment was assigned at the close of the war, surrendered his command at Chalk Bluff, Arkansas on May 11, 1865, and agreed to have his men assemble at Wittsburg and Jacksonport, Arkansas to lay down their arms and receive their paroles. Thompson's command was widely dispersed throughout northeast Arkansas, more for reasons of available forage than anything else. Most members of the 23rd Arkansas surrendered and were paroled at Wittsburg on May 25, 1865.

== See also ==
- List of Confederate units from Arkansas
- Confederate Units by State
