= Charles W. Adams (Confederate general) =

Confederate States Army colonel (1817–1878)

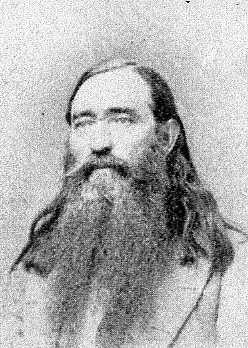
- Born: August 16, 1817; Boston, Massachusetts
- Died: September 9, 1878 (aged 61); Memphis, Tennessee
- Burial place: Elmwood Cemetery (Memphis, Tennessee)
- Relatives: Helen Keller (granddaughter)
- Military career
- Allegiance: Confederate States of America
- Branch: Confederate States Army
- Service years: 1861–1865
- Rank: Colonel, CSA; Appointed to duty as: Acting Brigadier General
- Commands: 23rd Arkansas Infantry Regiment; Adams' Arkansas Infantry Regiment
- Conflicts: American Civil War * Battle of Prairie Grove * Battle of Missionary Ridge
- Other work: Lawyer

Charles William Adams (August 16, 1817 – September 9, 1878) was an American Confederate States Army colonel during the American Civil War. In 1864, he was commander of the Confederate Northern Sub-District of Arkansas, within the Union Army lines. He had the title, although not the formal rank, of "acting brigadier general." He was not officially appointed by Confederate President Jefferson Davis and confirmed by the Confederate States Senate to brigadier general grade, even though some sources identify him as a brigadier general.

Adams was a planter, lawyer and judge before the war and a lawyer after the war. As a delegate to the Arkansas secession convention, he was an ardent secessionist. He was a law partner of United States Senator William K. Sebastian before the war and of Confederate brigadier general and Sovereign Grand Commander of the Scottish Rite of Freemasons Southern Jurisdiction, Albert Pike, after the war. He was the maternal grandfather of Helen Keller.

== Early life ==
Charles W. Adams was born Charles William Adams in Boston, Massachusetts on August 16, 1817. His parents were Benjamin and Susannah (née Goodhue) Adams. Benjamin was related to President of the United States John Adams.

In 1819, the Adams family moved to New Albany, Indiana, where Charles was a clerk in a mercantile house between 1830 and 1835. Adams moved to Helena, Arkansas in 1835 and became a cashier in a mercantile house. In 1837, he became cashier of the Real Estate Bank of Arkansas. After studying law at night, he became a lawyer in 1839. In the early 1840s, Adams entered into a law partnership with William K. Sebastian, who became a United States senator in 1848. Adams was a judge from 1852 to 1854. He also became a large cotton planter and slaveholder.

Adams married Lucy Helen Everett. Their daughter Catherine Everett Keller was the mother of Helen Keller.

Adams was a presidential elector for John Bell in 1860. He was elected to the Arkansas secession convention in 1861 and vigorously advocated for secession of that state from the union.

== American Civil War service ==
In 1861, Charles W. Adams first served the Confederacy as a major and quartermaster of Arkansas state troops under Brigadier General Thomas Bradley, soon succeeded by Major General James Yell. The Provisional Army of Arkansas was dissolved and incorporated into the Confederate States Army later in 1861. Adams then raised an infantry regiment, the 23rd Arkansas Infantry Regiment from the Helena, Arkansas area. Adams was elected colonel on April 25, 1862. The regiment joined the Army of Tennessee after the Battle of Shiloh.

After a few months, Adams returned to Arkansas to take charge of a new regiment. Except for two companies of veterans, they were mainly unwilling conscripts. The men were mustered into service on September 12, 1862. The regiment became known as Adams' Arkansas Infantry Regiment.

At the Battle of Prairie Grove, Arkansas on December 7, 1862, Adams's regiment was ordered forward after the battle had started, to fill a gap in the Confederate line. They headed directly for the sound of the firing, lost their way and ended up in a deep ravine from which they had to be extracted to take their place in the line. Adams kept his men in place for a short time in order to steady them. Soon, they unleashed a volley on the flank of an advancing Union regiment, the 26th Regiment Indiana Infantry, sending that regiment into retreat. As the Confederates advanced in close ranks, the 37th Illinois Volunteer Infantry Regiment made a stand in an orchard, from which they brought Adams's regiment under heavy fire. Most of the men, except for some veterans of the Battle of Wilson's Creek in the two veteran companies, then fled the field. Adams was nonetheless praised for his own leadership and performance. Adams and his remaining men fell in with Colonel Emmett MacDonald's Brigade of Brigadier General John S. Marmaduke's Division. The flight of most of the men of Adams's regiment had little effect on the outcome of the battle. Adams's regiment was disbanded on December 16, 1862.

Adams then served on the staff of fellow Arkansas citizen Major General Thomas C. Hindman, who commanded a division in the Army of Tennessee. Adams served as acting assistant inspector general and chief of staff of the division.

In his 1887 history of Arkansas, John Hallum says that Adams won a brigadier general commission for his gallantry on the field at the Battle of Missionary Ridge, November 25, 1863. Historian Bruce S. Allardice wrote in 1995 that "no record of Adams' promotion exists." Adams returned to Arkansas in December 1863.

In 1864, Adams served as commander of the Northern Sub-District of Arkansas, which was behind Union lines. Some sources show his rank as "acting brigadier general." Confederate cavalry Brigadier General Joseph O. Shelby and his adjutant, Major John Newman Edwards each held a low opinion of Adams. Edwards accused Adams of being more interested in cotton trading than in fighting. When Shelby operated in this area of Arkansas, he relegated Adams to handling only civil matters. Adams remained in command until at least December 27, 1864. He likely formally remained on duty until the end of the war.

== Later life ==
Adams briefly returned to Helena, Arkansas after the war. He attempted to practice law but the local federal military authorities would not permit him to do so because he refused to take the Ironclad oath. Later in 1865, Adams moved to Memphis, Tennessee. There he opened a law practice with former Confederate brigadier general and prominent Freemason, Albert Pike.

Charles William Adams died on September 9, 1878, of yellow fever at Memphis, Tennessee. He is buried in Elmwood Cemetery, in Memphis.

Charles W. Adams was the maternal grandfather of the author, political activist, disability advocate and lecturer Helen Keller, who overcame deafblindness to achieve her many accomplishments.
