= 11th Arkansas Infantry Regiment =

Infantry regiment of the Confederate States Army

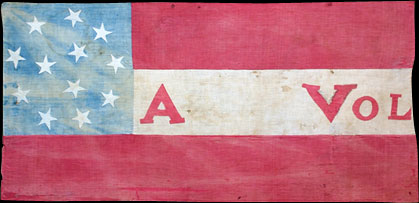
- National color of the Eleventh Arkansas at the Old State House Museum in Little Rock, Arkansas
- Active: 1861–1865
- Disbanded: May 26, 1865
- Country: Confederate States
- Allegiance: Arkansas
- Branch: Army
- Type: Infantry
- Size: Regiment
- Facings: Light blue
- Battles: American Civil War; Battle of Island No. 10; Siege of Port Hudson; Battle of Mount Elba

Commanders
- Commanding officers: Col. John L. Logan; Maj. James T. Poe (acting)

The 11th Arkansas Infantry Regiment, also known as the "Eleventh Arkansas", was an infantry formation of the Confederate States Army during the American Civil War.

Following the regiment's surrender during the Battle of Island No. 10, it was consolidated with Griffith's 17th Arkansas Infantry Regiment and mounted. Following the surrender of Port Hudson, some unit members returned to Arkansas and became part of Poe's Arkansas Cavalry Battalion and Logan's 11th Arkansas Cavalry Regiment.

== Formation ==
The regiment was organized in Saline County, Arkansas, in July 1861. The mustering officer for the regiment was George M. Holt, a Brigadier General of the Arkansas State Militia. The unit was composed of volunteer companies from the following counties:

- Company A – the "Saline Tornadoes" – Commanded by Captain M. Vance, Saline County, Arkansas. Captain Vance, and 1st Lieutenant M. A. Shepherd of this company had been commissioned as the company officers of Company D, 2nd Battalion, 18th Militia Regiment, Saline County on 10 May 1860. It is thought that they probably enrolled many of the men of this company in the Saline Tornados.
- Company B – the "Rough and Ready Riflemen" – Commanded by Captain J. Douglas, organized in Saline County, Arkansas.
- Company C – Commanded by Captain J. Sanders, organized in Saline County, Arkansas.
- Company D – the "Fairplay Riflemen" – Commanded by Captain Z. Philips, organized in Saline County, Arkansas.
- Company E – the "Falcon Guards" – Commanded by Captain J. Moss, organized in Columbia County, Arkansas.
- Company F – the "Saline Avengers" – Commanded by Captain L. Mauney, organized in Saline County, Arkansas. Captain Mauney of this company had been commissioned as the Company Commander of Company G, 2nd Battalion, 18th Militia Regiment, Saline County on 10 May 1860. It is thought that he probably enrolled many of the men of this company in the Saline Avengers.
- Company G – the "Camden Knights No. 2" – Commanded by Captain J. Logan, organized in Ouachita County, Arkansas.
- Company H – Commanded by Captain J. Matthews, organized in Columbia County, Arkansas.
- Company I – Commanded by Captain Anderson Cunningham, organized in Saline County, Arkansas.
- Company K – Commanded by Captain J. G. Johnson, organized in Saline County, Arkansas.

The regimental officers at the time of formation were:

- Smith, Jabez M., colonel
- Miller, Mark S., lieutenant colonel
- Poe, James T., major
- Burke, J.D., drum major
- Gessweller, Joseph, asst surgeon
- Green, Goodwin, drum major
- Hogue, Ezekiel, chaplain

The exact date of the units' muster into confederate service is unclear. The unit was included in the list of regiments transferred to Confederate Service by the Arkansas State Military Board July 28, 1861, but the unit was not fully organized at that time. An election for Field Grade Officers was conducted on July 28, but the results were contested by Captain John Logan of Company G because only eight companies were present, instead of the required ten. A new election was ordered by the State Military Board and it was held on August 8, 1861. The results were the same as the first election with the exception that Mark S. Miller was elected lieutenant colonel in the place of Hordley. The field grade officers received their commissions in the Provisional Army of the Confederate States on August 8, 1861.

== American Civil War ==
=== 1861 ===
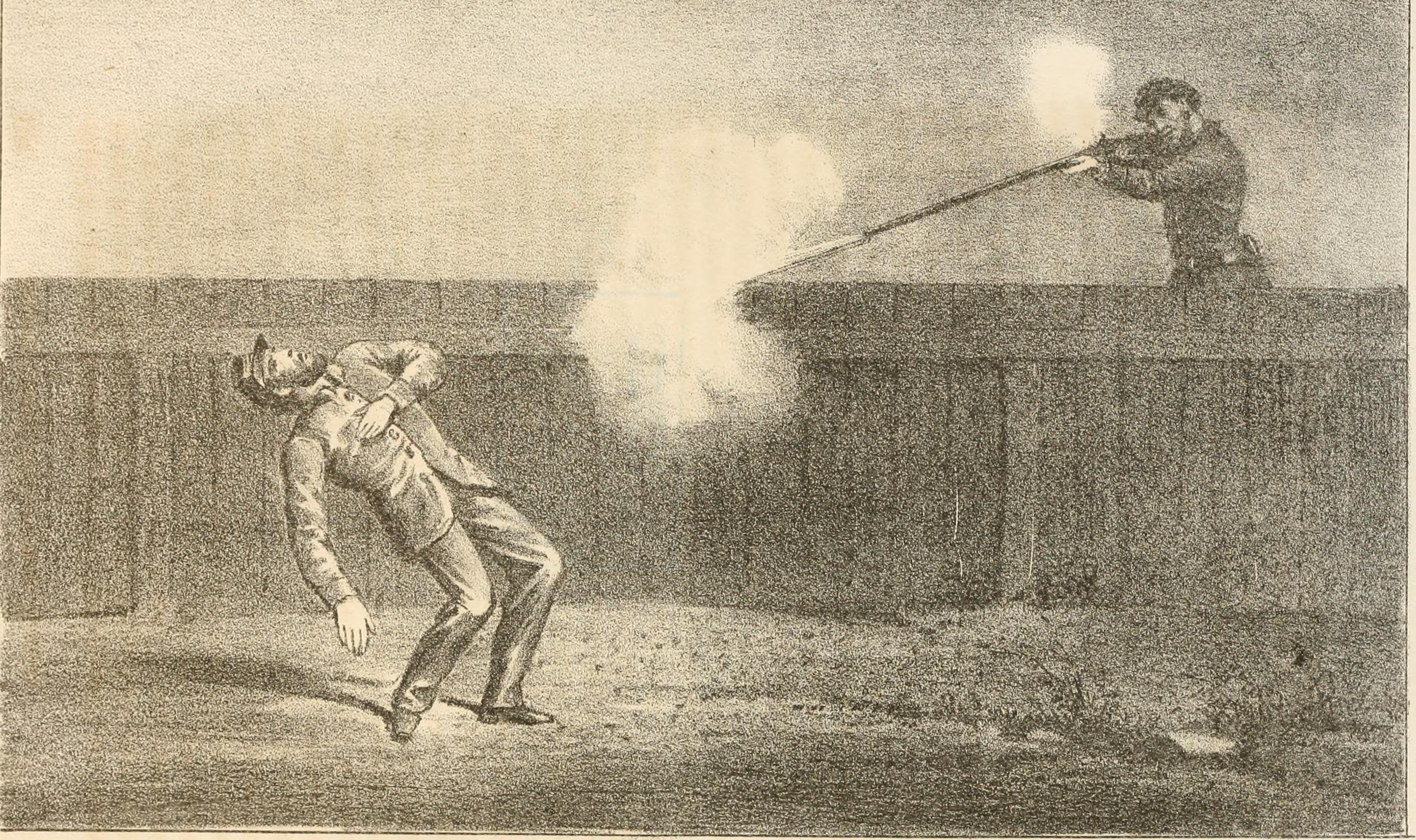
"Murder of Lieutenant Gibson" (Scraps from the prison table, at Camp Chase and Johnson's Island by Joseph Barbiere, a fellow prisoner.

The regiment was ordered to Little Rock on August 9, 1861, and remained there until August 20, when the unit was ordered to Pine Bluff. The unit boarded boats on August 27 for the five-day trip by river to Memphis Tennessee where the unit arrive on 1 September 1861. The unit remained in the Memphis area until September 26 when the unit was ordered to Fort Pillow, Tennessee. The unit was eventually brigaded with the 12th Arkansas Infantry Regiment, commanded by Col. Edward W. Gantt; was stationed at Island Number Ten on the Mississippi River, and transferred back and forth to New Madrid at the will of General Gideon J. Pillow.

=== 1862 ===
Island Number Ten was surrendered April 15, 1862, after a terrific bombardment by the enemy's mortar-boats and gunboats, aided by an overflow which nearly submerged the island. The Confederate defenses consisted of dissolving earthworks and twenty guns. Maj. W. J. Hoadley, of Little Rock, spiked his battery of guns and made his escape with one section of the battalion. The others were included in the surrender documents, and were transported to Camp Butler near Springfield, Ill., then to Camp Chase (Chicago), the officers to Johnson's Island, Lake Erie. Lieutenant Gibson, of Company H, was shot dead on Johnson's Island by a Federal sentinel because he crossed the "dead line".

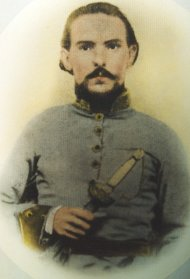
Colonel John L. Logan, Commander 11th/17th Consolidated Arkansas Infantry Regiment (Mounted)

Colonel John Griffith had previously served in Gratiot's 3rd Regiment, Arkansas State Troops

The 11th and 12th Arkansas Infantry regiments were exchanged September 16, 1862, at Vicksburg, Mississippi. Because their original one-year enlistment was expiring, the regiment was required to be reorganized for two additional years. This reorganization resulted in the election of the following officers:

- Col. John L. Logan.
- Lieut. Col. M. D. Vance.
- Maj. James T. Poe.
- Adjt. Edward A. Warren.
- Quartermaster E. Whitfield.
- Commissary Clerk.
- Surgeon James Whitfield.
- Company A – Capt. Jasper Shepherd.
- Company B – Capt. Claiborne Watkins.
- Company C – Capt. James D. Burke.
- Company D – Capt. A. A. Crawford.
- Company E – Capt. William Russell Selvidge
- Company F – Capt. L. H. Kemp.
- Company G – Capt. Frank Scott.
- Company H – Captain Matthews.
- Company I – Capt. W. F. Morton.
- Company K – Anderson Cunningham.

=== 1863 ===
The reorganized regiment was ordered to lower Mississippi. In March 1863, the 11th and Griffith's 17th Arkansas Infantry regiments were consolidated and mounted. Colonel John L. Logan was placed in command. The consolidated regiment was dispatched to Clinton, Mississippi, to head off the raid of the Federal General Grierson, but failed to meet him. At this time Colonel Logan served as the commander of a brigade which included 11th/17th so Col Griffin, originally of the 17th Arkansas, was often in field command of the consolidated regiment. The unit operated outside the fortifications of Port Hudson during the siege in March 1863. This detachment operated against the army under General Banks in Louisiana, and took a number of prisoners, among them Gen. Neal Dow. Some members of the 11/17th Consolidated Arkansas Mounted Infantry were captured at the Siege of Port Hudson on July 9, 1863. These men were later released and exchanged in Arkansas and many would later join Poe's Arkansas Cavalry Battalion.

In November 1863 Colonel Logan made a trip to Richmond Virginia and made an impassioned request for the transfer of his regiment back to Arkansas. Colonel Logan's request for the transfer of his battalion fell on deaf ears, but he was personally transferred to the Trans-Mississippi Department. Colonel Griffith of the 17th Arkansas assumed command of the 11/17th Consolidated Regiment and led the unit until the end of the war.

=== 1864 ===
Colonel Logan eventually achieved his purpose to a degree. When members of the 11/17th Consolidated Arkansas Mounted Infantry were released on furlough to return to Arkansas for recruiting duty in early 1864, many elected to remain in Arkansas rather than return to their command in southern Mississippi. Instead of returning to Colonel Griffin's command, many of these soldiers reported to Colonel Logan in the Trans Mississippi and by late 1864, Colonel Logan's unit, now recognized as the 11th Arkansas Cavalry Regiment or Logan's Arkansas Cavalry Regiment, was back on the roster of units for the Department of the Trans-Mississippi.

=== 1865 ===
The portion of the regiment that remained as part of the 11th and 17th Consolidated Arkansas Infantry Regiment were surrendered at Surrendered at Citronelle, Alabama, on May 4, 1865. The portion of the regiment that had rejoined Colonel Logan in Arkansas were surrendered with the Department of the Trans-Mississippi on May 26, 1865.

== National color ==
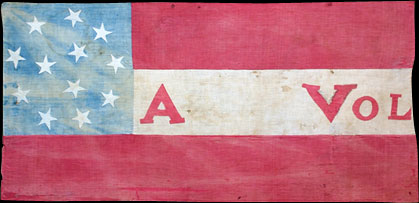
National color of the Eleventh Arkansas at the Old State House Museum in Little Rock, Arkansas.

A variation of the national color of 1861, with twelve white five-pointed stars, nine in a circle and three within it, was previously attributed to the 9th Arkansas Volunteers, but more recent research indicates that the color actually belong to the 11th Arkansas Volunteers and was found, along with the regiment's baggage in Fort Thompson, Missouri after the unit evacuated Island No. 10.

The color was returned to Arkansas by the State of Michigan in 1941. The flag is a first Confederate national flag pattern variation made of cotton and cotton damask, measuring 46 in × 69 in (1,200 mm × 1,800 mm) and it is currently in the collection of the Old State House Museum, Little Rock, Arkansas.

== See also ==
- List of Confederate units from Arkansas

== Bibliography ==
- Poe, J.C., comp. and ed. The Raving Foe: the Civil War Diary of Major James T. Poe, C.S.A., and the 11th Arkansas Volunteers, and a Complete List of Prisoners. (Eastland, TX: Longhorn Press, 1967).
- Rushing, Anthony C., Ranks of Honor: A Regimental History of the Eleventh Arkansas Infantry Regiment and Poe's Cavalry Battalion, C.S.A., 1861- 1865. (Little Rock, AR: Eagle Press, 1990).
- Lide, J. E. "The Eleventh Arkansas Regiment." Ouachita County Historical Quarterly, 9, No. 4 (June 1978): 10–12.
