= 8th Arkansas Infantry Battalion =

Infantry battalion of the Confederate States Army

- Active: 1862-1865
- Country: Confederate States
- Allegiance: Arkansas
- Branch: Army
- Type: Infantry
- Size: Battalion
- Facings: Light blue
- Engagements: American Civil War: Siege of Corinth; Battle of Farmington; Iuka-Corinth Campaign; Battle of Iuka; Battle of Corinth; Siege of Port Hudson

The 8th Arkansas Infantry Battalion (1862–1865) was a Confederate Army infantry regiment during the American Civil War."

== Organization ==
The unit was initially composed of volunteer companies from the following counties:

- Company A—"Clark Rifles," from Clark county, Capt. Newton S. Love.
- Company B—"Chicot Rebels," from Chicot county, Capt. James D. Imboden.
- Company C—"Peyton Rifles," from Pulaski county, Capt. James J. Franklin. This company was originally organized on April 20, 1860, as a volunteer company in the 13th Regiment, Arkansas State Militia, under the command of Captain Daniel W. Ringo. The company was assigned to Borland's Arkansas Militia Battalion and participated in the seizure of the Fort Smith Arsenal in April 1861, before the state seceded. The company was enrolled in Confederate service at Little Rock, Arkansas, on March 15, 1862, under the command of Captain J. J. Franklin of Little Rock. Captain Franklin was elected major at the regimental organization and subsequently lieutenant colonel. He was succeeded by Captain L. L. Noles, who was eventually promoted to major, and was succeeded by First Lieutenant John O'Brien. This company was eventually transferred to the 25th Arkansas.
- Company D—"Black River Rifles," from Lawrence county, Capt. Robert C. Jones.
- Company E—"Greene County Roughs," from Greene county, Capt. Guy S. Murray.
- Company F—"Wood's Rifles," from Craighead county, Capt. Joel G. Wood.
- Company G—"Ashley Light Infantry," from Ashley county, Capt. Micajah R. Wilson.
- Company H—"Lawrence Dead-Shots," from Lawrence county, Capt. Joseph C. Holmes.

With the loss of the Peyton Rifles the companies were re-lettered as follows:

- Company A—"Clark Rifles," from Clark county, Capt. Newton S. Love.
- Company B—"Chicot Rebels," from Chicot county, Capt. James D. Imboden.
- Company C—"Black River Rifles," from Lawrence county, Capt. Robert C. Jones.
- Company D—"Greene County Roughs," from Greene county, Capt. Guy S. Murray.
- Company E—"Wood's Rifles," from Craighead county, Capt. Joel G. Wood.
- Company F—"Ashley Light Infantry," from Ashley county, Capt. Micajah R. Wilson.
- Company G—"Lawrence Dead-Shots," from Lawrence county, Capt. Joseph C. Holmes.

== Battles ==
During the Iuka-Corinth Campaign, September - October 1862, the 8th Arkansas Infantry Battalion was assigned to Brigadier General William L. Cabell's brigade of Brigadier General Dabney H. Maury's Division of Major General Sterling Price's 1st Corps the Confederate (Army of the West).

Battle of Farmington, May 9, 1862.
Battle of Iuka, September 19, 1862
Siege of Corinth, April to June 1862.
Battle of Corinth, October 3–4, 1862
Siege of Port Hudson, May to July, 1863

== Surrender ==
The portion of the 8th Arkansas Infantry Battalion that became consolidated with 12th Arkansas Infantry Regiment, 18th Arkansas Infantry Regiment, 23rd Arkansas Infantry Regiment and the 12th Arkansas Infantry Battalion to form the 2nd Arkansas Consolidated Infantry Regiment which was surrendered along with the rest of the Department of the Trans Mississippi by General Kirby Smith on May 26, 1865, at Marshall, Texas. Other former members appear on parole lists of the unit surrendered at Wittsburg and Jacksonport, Arkansas, in May and June 1865.

== See also ==
- List of Confederate units from Arkansas
- Confederate Units by State
