= 1st Mississippi Light Artillery Regiment =

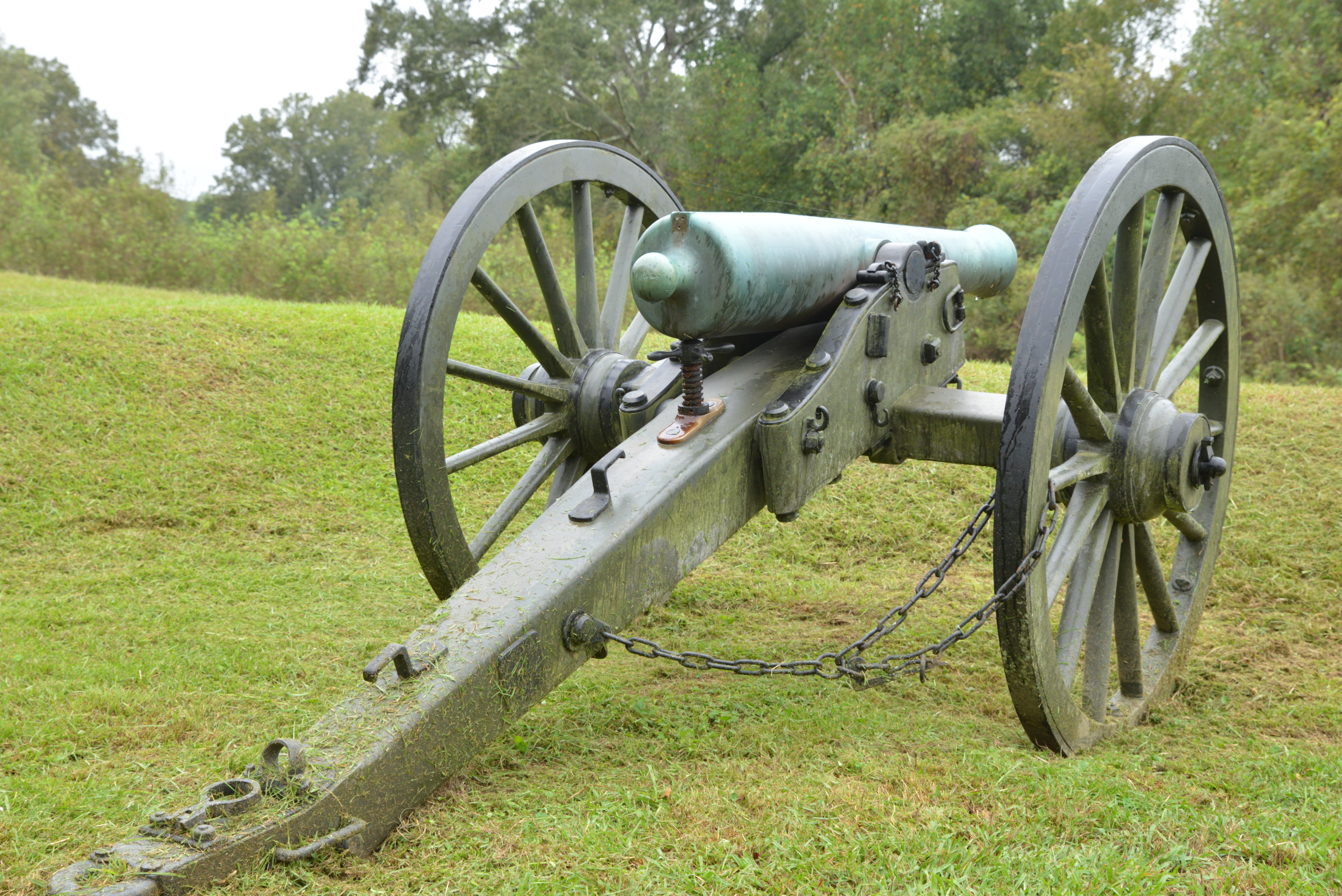
- M1857 12-pounder Napoleon gun, of the type used by the 1st Mississippi Light Infantry, at Vicksburg National Military Park.
- Active: 1862-1865
- Country: Confederate States of America
- Allegiance: Mississippi
- Branch: Confederate States Army
- Type: Artillery
- Size: Regiment
- Battles: American Civil War: Battle of Chickasaw Bayou; Battle of Champion Hill; Siege of Vicksburg; Siege of Port Hudson; Battle of Plains Store; Battle of Tupelo; Atlanta campaign; Battle of Fort Blakeley

The 1st Mississippi Light Artillery Regiment was a unit of the Confederate States Army from Mississippi. Formed in 1862, the regiment was sent to defend the strategic points of Vicksburg and Port Hudson along the Mississippi River. After the surrender of Confederate forces at Vicksburg on July 4, 1863, the various companies of the 1st Light Artillery were dispersed and saw action across the Western theater of the American Civil War, although they never operated as a combined regiment. The final remnants of these artillery batteries surrendered in April 1865 after the Battle of Fort Blakeley.

== Formation ==
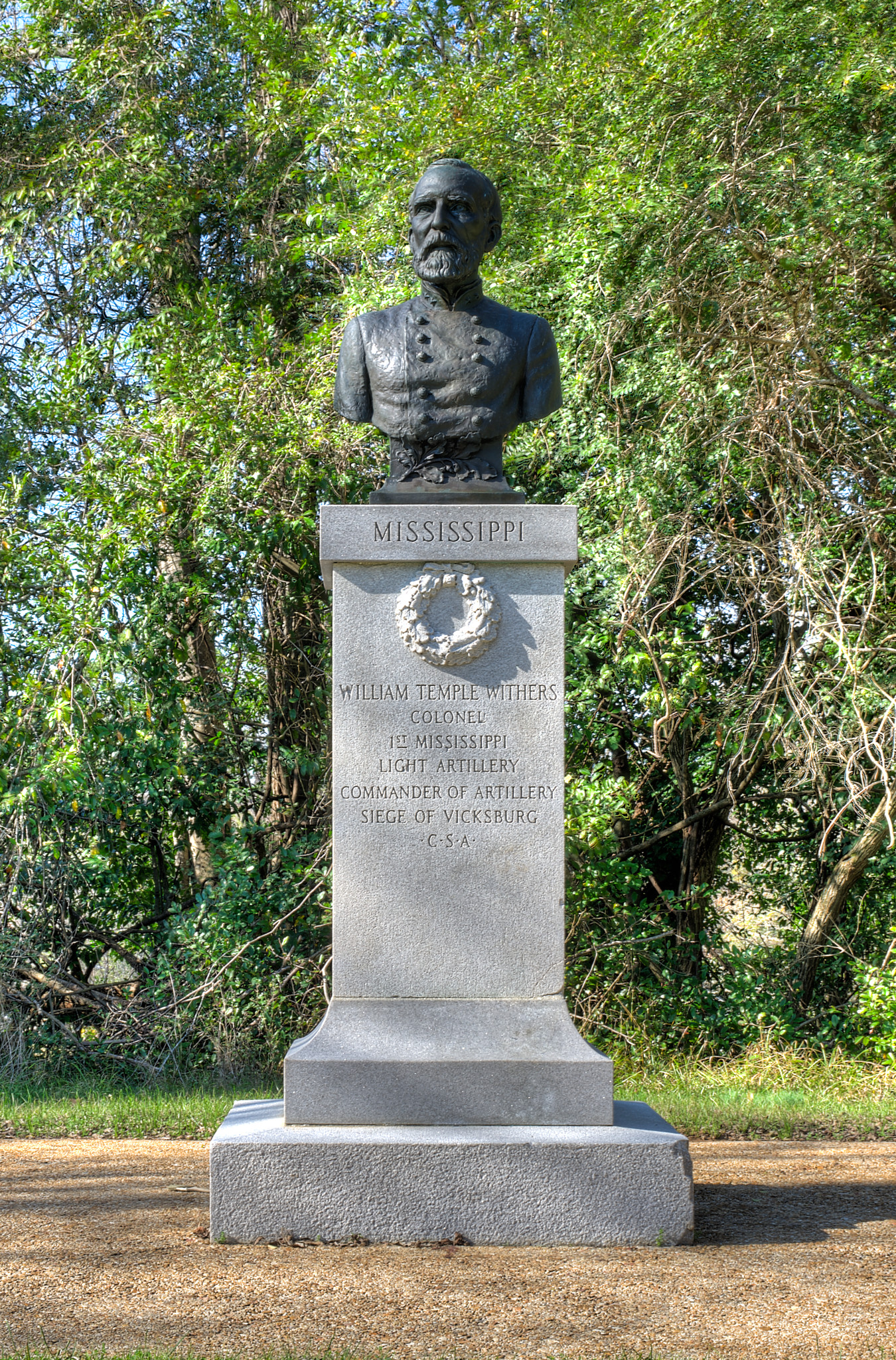
Memorial to Col. William T. Withers of the 1st Light Artillery, at Vicksburg National Military Park.

The 1st Mississippi Light Artillery was organized in May, 1862, at Jackson, and then sent to Vicksburg to defend the city from attacks by Federal gunboats. The different companies of the regiment were dispersed to defend various strategic points around Vicksburg and Port Hudson, Louisiana.

The technical skills required to serve in the artillery meant that men who enlisted in units such as the 1st Mississippi Light Infantry were more educated on average and more likely to live in cities compared to their counterparts in the infantry, who were mostly rural farmers. A study of Company G of the 1st Mississippi Light Infantry found that only 20.5% of the men were farmers, whereas 26.9% were students, 7.8% were clerks, and the rest had non-farm professions such as artisan and craftsman.

Company L, known as the Vaiden Artillery or Bains' Battery was formed independently of the other companies in early 1862. While the company as a whole was not organized in time to take part in the April 1862 Battle of Shiloh, several men from this battery acted as substitutes for other Confederate artillery units during the battle to replace soldiers who were disabled or sick. Bains' Battery also manned a 24-pounder rifled siege gun during the Siege of Corinth, and then joined the 1st Light Artillery Regiment in the spring of 1863 at Vicksburg.

== Vicksburg Campaign ==
In late December 1862, Confederate troops defeated a Union attempt to advance on Vicksburg at the Battle of Chickasaw Bayou, and the batteries of the 1st Mississippi Light Artillery played a crucial role in the battle. Union General William T. Sherman's forces had to advance across difficult swampy terrain while Confederate troops stationed atop the nearby bluffs were able to hit them with artillery and rifle fire, causing the Union attack to fail. General Stephen D. Lee praised the Colonel of the 1st Light Artillery, William T. Withers: "I would particularly mention Colonel Withers, who exhibited high soldierly qualities and great gallantry, first in holding the enemy in check after landing, and in repulsing him when my right flank was threatened. His dispositions were excellent." Captain Jefferson L. Wofford, commander of Company D, was also praised in the same report: "Captain Wofford exhibited great gallantry and coolness, and to him is due more credit than to any one else for such defenses as were at Chickasaw Bayou, he having planned and executed most of them."

Company H, known as the Conner Battery, commanded by Captain George Ralston was assigned to the Trans-Mississippi department in September 1862 and operated independently of the rest of the regiment. This battery took part in the Siege of Port Hudson, the Battle of Milliken's Bend, the Battle of LaFourche Crossing, the Second Battle of Donaldsonville, and other skirmishes, remaining in Louisiana for the rest of the war.

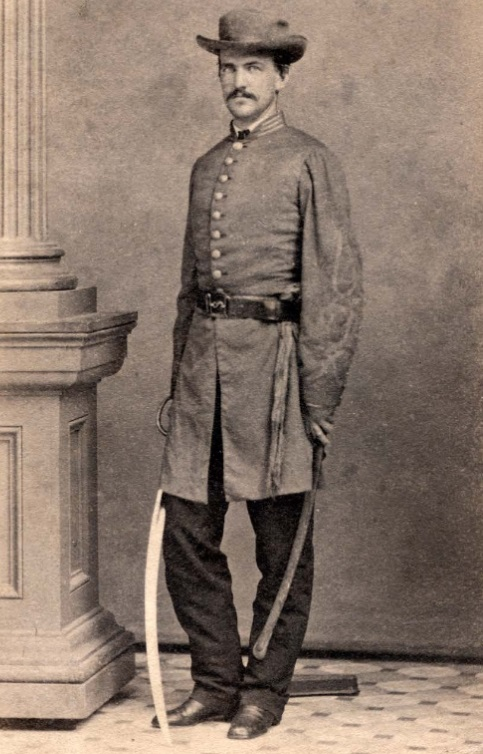
Capt. George Abbey, commander of Company K, who led his battery during the fighting at Port Hudson.

Companies B, F, & K were deployed across the Mississippi River in Louisiana and took part in the Siege of Port Hudson and the Battle of Plains Store. These companies took many casualties during the fighting around Port Hudson, and surrendered on July 9, 1863, a few days after the fall of Vicksburg.

The companies posted around Vicksburg took part in the Battle of Champion Hill in May, 1863, where Captain Samuel J. Ridley of Company A was killed. General William Wing Loring described the actions of the 1st Mississippi Light Artillery in this battle: "It was here that we witnessed a scene ever to be remembered, when the gallant Withers and his brave men, with their fine park of artillery, stood unflinchingly amid a shower of shot and shell the approach of an enemy in overwhelming force, after his supports had been driven back, and trusting that a succoring command would arrive in time to save his batteries, and displaying a degree of courage and determination that calls for the most unqualified admiration." During this battle, Confederate General Lloyd Tilghman was directing the fire of Company G of the 1st Mississippi Light Artillery when he was hit by a Union shell and killed.

Following the defeat at Champion Hill, a detachment of the regiment fought at the Battle of Big Black River Bridge, with several killed and 3 guns lost. After these defeats, the Confederates moved within the defensive lines of the city and the Union forces laid siege to Vicksburg. The guns of the 1st Mississippi were used to repel Union attacks during the siege. After the Confederate surrender on July 4, and Port Hudson on July 9, the men of the 1st Light Artillery were taken prisoner by Union forces.

== Subsequent actions ==
The enlisted men were sent to parole camps to await exchange, all of their guns had been lost at Vicksburg and Port Hudson. After being reorganized, the different batteries of the regiment were scattered and assigned to different commands, and they did not operate as a combined unit for the remainder of the war. Being disarmed after the surrender at Vicksburg, some men of the artillery joined infantry units, or joined Wirt Adams' Cavalry Regiment.

Company G was reorganized and re-equipped in 1864, and sent to Georgia to take part in the Atlanta campaign under General Loring's division, and then joined the Franklin-Nashville Campaign in Tennessee. One company took part in the Battle of Tupelo under General Stephen D. Lee, and companies B, C, D, I, & K were posted in Mobile, Alabama. During the final stages of the war, these companies were among the defenders at the Battle of Fort Blakeley which ended in a Confederate defeat. The remaining men of the First Mississippi Light Artillery were taken prisoner and then taken to Ship Island prisoner of war camp until the end of the conflict.

== Notable Members ==
- Charles E. Hooker, Attorney General of Mississippi 1865–1868, US Representative from Mississippi, 1875–1883. Lost an arm at Vicksburg.
- Frank Johnston, Attorney General of Mississippi 1893 - 1896.

== Equipment ==
Artillery pieces used by the 1st Mississippi Light Artillery:

- M1857 12-pounder Napoleon
- M1841 12-pounder howitzer
- M1841 6-pounder field gun
- 10-lb Parrott rifle
- Blakely rifle
- 3-inch ordnance rifle
- 3.3-inch rifle

== Commanders ==
Commanders of the 1st Mississippi Light Artillery:

- Col. William T. Withers
- Lt. Col. James P. Parker

== Organization ==
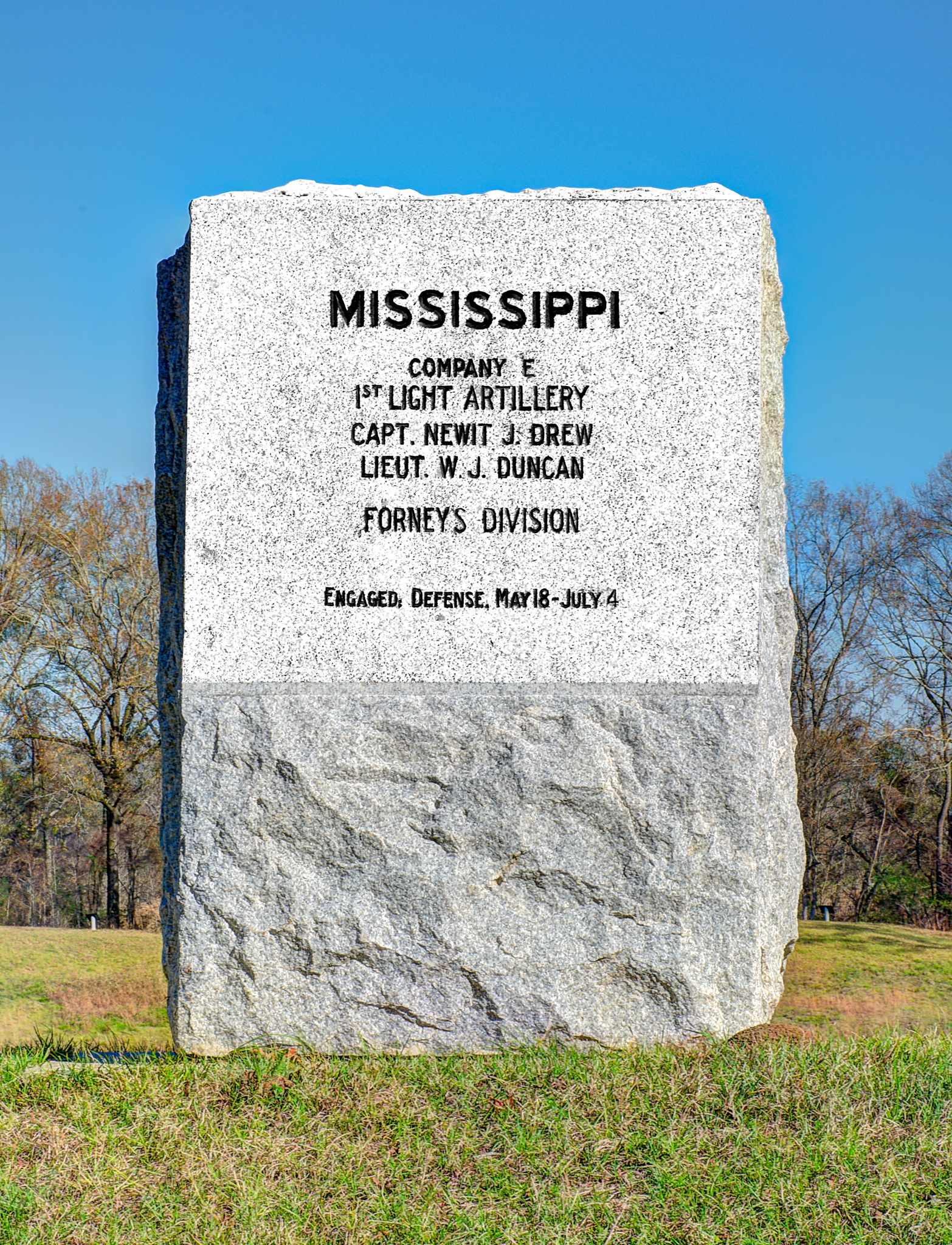
Marker of Company E's position at Vicksburg National Military Park.

Companies of the 1st Mississippi Light Artillery:

- Company A, "Ridley's Battery", of Hinds and Jefferson Counties.
- Company B, "Vaughn Rebels", aka "Herrod's Battery" of Yazoo County.
- Company C, "Turner's Battery" of Choctaw County.
- Company D, "Wofford's Battery"
- Company E, "Sanderson's Battery"
- Company F, "Bradford's Battery"
- Company G, "Cowan's Battery" of Warren County.
- Company H, "Conner Battery" of Natchez
- Company I, "Bowman's Battery" of Yazoo County
- Company K, "Abbay's Battery" of Claiborne and Jefferson Counties.
- Company L, "Vaiden Artillery" aka "Bains' Battery" of Carroll County.

== See also ==
- List of Mississippi Civil War Confederate units
