= Franklin Gardner =

Confederate army general (1823–1873)

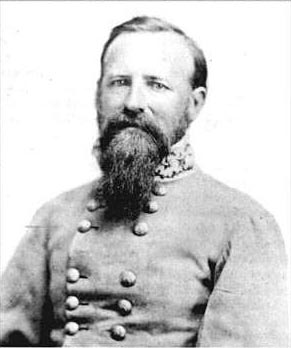
- Born: January 29, 1823; New York City, US
- Died: April 29, 1873 (aged 50); Lafayette, Louisiana, US
- Education: United States Military Academy
- Relatives: Brigadier General Alfred Mouton (brother-in-law); Governor of Louisiana Alexandre Mouton (father-in-law)
- Military career
- Allegiance: United States; Confederate States
- Branch: United States Army; Confederate States Army
- Service years: 1843–1861 (USA); 1861–1865 (CSA)
- Rank: Captain (USA); Major General (CSA)
- Units: 7th U.S. Infantry; 10th U.S. Infantry
- Commands: Cavalry / Army of Mississippi; Gardner's (Deas') Brigade; District of the Gulf; District of Mississippi & Eastern Louisiana
- Conflicts: Mexican–American War: Battle of Monterrey; Siege of Veracruz; Battle of Churubusco; Battle of Molino del Rey; Utah War; American Civil War; Battle of Shiloh; Battle of Perryville; Siege of Port Hudson (surrendered)

Franklin Kitchell Gardner (January 29, 1823 – April 29, 1873) was a Confederate major general in the American Civil War, noted for his service at the Siege of Port Hudson on the Mississippi River. Gardner built extensive fortifications at this important garrison, 16,000 strong at its peak. At the mercy of conflicting orders, he found himself besieged and greatly outnumbered. His achievement at holding out for 47 days and inflicting severe losses on the enemy before surrendering has been praised by military historians.

== Early life ==
Gardner was born in New York City to Lieutenant-Colonel Charles Kitchell Gardner (1787–1869) and Anne Eliza McLean Gardner (1801–1880). Charles Kitchell Gardner was son of a Revolutionary War hero. His mother was from Louisiana, where she was a member of a wealthy plantation-owning family. He attended the United States Military Academy from 1838 to 1843, being appointed by the State of Iowa, and distinguishing himself as the class's top Drawing student during the whole time. With mixed grades, his class rank was lowered by a fairly high number of demerits. He graduated 17th out of a class of 39. Among his classmates were Ulysses S. Grant, Rufus Ingalls, and Samuel G. French.

He married Marie Celeste Mouton, the daughter of Louisiana Governor Alexander Mouton, shortly thereafter. His wife's brother, Alfred Mouton, also became a prominent Confederate general. Gardner's older sister became the second wife of his wife's father, cementing the ties between the two families.

== Early military career ==
Upon graduation he was assigned as a second lieutenant in the 7th Infantry. Serving first in Pensacola, Florida, he served in the Mexican–American War, first under Major General Zachary Taylor, then under Major General Winfield Scott. At the Battle of Monterrey in September 1846, he received a brevet appointment to first lieutenant for bravery. He later served at the siege of Vera Cruz, Churubusco, and Molino del Rey. For bravery in these later battles, he was brevetted once again to captain. In 1847 he was assigned as regimental adjutant, a position he held until 1853.

He served in various posts throughout the United States: in New York, Florida, Missouri, Arkansas, Pennsylvania and the Pacific Northwest. He received a promotion to full Captain in the 10th U.S. Infantry in March 1855, and served in the Utah War. Following a two-year leave of absence from 1858 to 1860, he was again stationed in Utah, but left for the south in 1861, and was dropped from the Army rolls. Siding with his wife's family, and his mother's, he returned to their home in Louisiana, where he joined the Confederate States Army.

== Civil War ==
=== Early war service ===
Initially commissioned a lieutenant colonel of Infantry, Gardner was soon reassigned as captain and adjutant-general to Brigadier General Early. In March 1862 Gardner was assigned a brigade of cavalry in the Army of Mississippi and served in the Battle of Shiloh in April 1862. His brigade being away from the battle, he served as a volunteer aide on the staff of Braxton Bragg. Promoted to brigadier general on April 11, 1862, he was named Chief of Cavalry by General P.G.T. Beauregard and fought in the Battle of Perryville. Afterwards, he was given command of a brigade of Alabamians in Withers' division of Lieutenant General Leonidas Polk's Corps. His command of the 19th, 22nd, 25th, 26th and 39th Alabama Infantry Regiments, as well as the 1st Louisiana Regulars, did not last long. On December 13, 1862, he was promoted to major general and assigned command of the fortifications at Port Hudson north of Baton Rouge, Louisiana, where he replaced Brigadier General William N.R. Beall, who remained at Port Hudson under Gardner's command.

=== Port Hudson ===
Port Hudson, Louisiana was strategically important, as it was at a bend in the Mississippi River, from which its guns could control passage north on the River. Union Major General Nathaniel P. Banks and his 30,000-man Army of the Gulf were deployed in New Orleans and surrounding areas, and it was generally expected that he would at some time attempt to capture Port Hudson. At the time, the whole stretch of the Mississippi from Port Hudson north 200 miles (320 km) (as the river flowed) to Vicksburg, Mississippi was controlled by the Confederacy. Lieutenant General John C. Pemberton, who commanded Confederate troops at Vicksburg, was Gardner's immediate superior, and General Joseph E. Johnston, headquartered in Jackson, Mississippi, was Pemberton's superior. Johnston did not control an army, however, and Gardner would soon be subjected to contradictory commands from Johnston and Pemberton.

Gardner immediately undertook an improvement to the defenses of Port Hudson, replacing a partially constructed system of lunettes with 4 miles (6.4 km) of earthworks extending from the Mississippi River on the southwestern corner of the fort, to the easternmost portion of the knoll on which Port Hudson stood. Earthworks were not constructed completely around the northern side of the fortifications, as the steep embankments were considered sufficient defense. In addition to the earthworks, Gardner instructed his men to create a series of abatis defenses, consisting of cut timbers sharpened at the ends and pointed in the direction of attackers.

Gardner's forces at Port Hudson grew in size to approximately 16,000 in March 1863, when Union Rear Admiral David Farragut succeeded in running two of his gunboats past Port Hudson. From this position, Farragut was able to disrupt supplies coming to Port Hudson from the Red River, whose mouth at the Mississippi lay between Port Hudson and Vicksburg. In May 1863, Banks began operations to surround Port Hudson with forces coming both the south and the north. By this time, Gardners' troop strength had been reduced to 7,000, the majority of his forces having been ordered to Vicksburg, where Pemberton was under attack by Union forces under the command of Ulysses S. Grant. On May 22, 1863, Gardner received a command from Johnston, who was at odds with Pemberton and Confederate President Jefferson Davis, to evacuate Port Hudson and proceed to Jackson, Mississippi. He was in the process of doing so when word came that 12,000 of Banks's troops had landed north of Port Hudson, while another 20,000 were approaching from the south. Gardner was surrounded, and an escape was impossible. Gardner hence settled in for a long siege. The first assault of the Siege of Port Hudson came on May 27, 1863. The siege lasted 47 days and did not end until July 9, 1863, when Gardner was informed that Vicksburg had fallen on July 4, 1863.

Gardner's command of Port Hudson is considered by many military historians as an example of an outstanding defense of a fortification besieged by a much larger army. Major General Richard Taylor, who commanded the Confederacy's Western District of Louisiana during the Siege of Port Hudson, considered Gardner a victim of the faulty Confederate military policy of immobilizing a large fighting force within a stationary fortification. This was the same defensive policy followed by Pemberton at Vicksburg, and it created the same unfortunate results for the Confederacy at Port Hudson as it did at Vicksburg. Confederate soldiers idolized Gardner, and newspapers called him a good fighter. However, he was criticized for the caretaking of his troops. Historian John D. Winters in The Civil War in Louisiana (1963), described Gardner's surrender at Port Hudson, accordingly:

"Gardner had defended Port Hudson to the utmost of his ability. After more than forty days of merciless pounding from the [Union] fleet and land batteries, his men were exhausted and dispirited. Improperly clothed, sheltered, and fed, they sickened, and there was no medicine for them. Hope that Johnston would send relief grew fainter as each day of the siege progressed. As Gardner's meager supply of ammunition was nearly exhausted, many of his guns were wrecked, and his food stock was dangerously low, the news of the surrender of Vicksburg decided the fate of Port Hudson [too]."

=== Subsequent career ===
Gardner stayed in a Union prisoner of war camp until he was exchanged in August 1864. He was given command of the District of Mississippi and Eastern Louisiana and served under Lieutenant General Richard Taylor. In January 1865 troops under his command opposed Union Brigadier General Benjamin Grierson's raid against the Mobile and Ohio Railroad. He surrendered with the department, and was paroled at Meridian, Mississippi on May 11, 1865.

== Death ==
After the war, he retired to his family farm in Vermilionville, Louisiana (which is near Lafayette, Louisiana), where he died in 1873 at age fifty.

His grave is the Cemetery of Saint John's Catholic Cathedral in Lafayette, Lafayette Parish, Louisiana, where he lies next to his father-in-law Alexandre Mouton.

== See also ==
- List of American Civil War generals (Confederate)
