= William Beall =

Confederate brigadier general

William Nelson Rector Beall
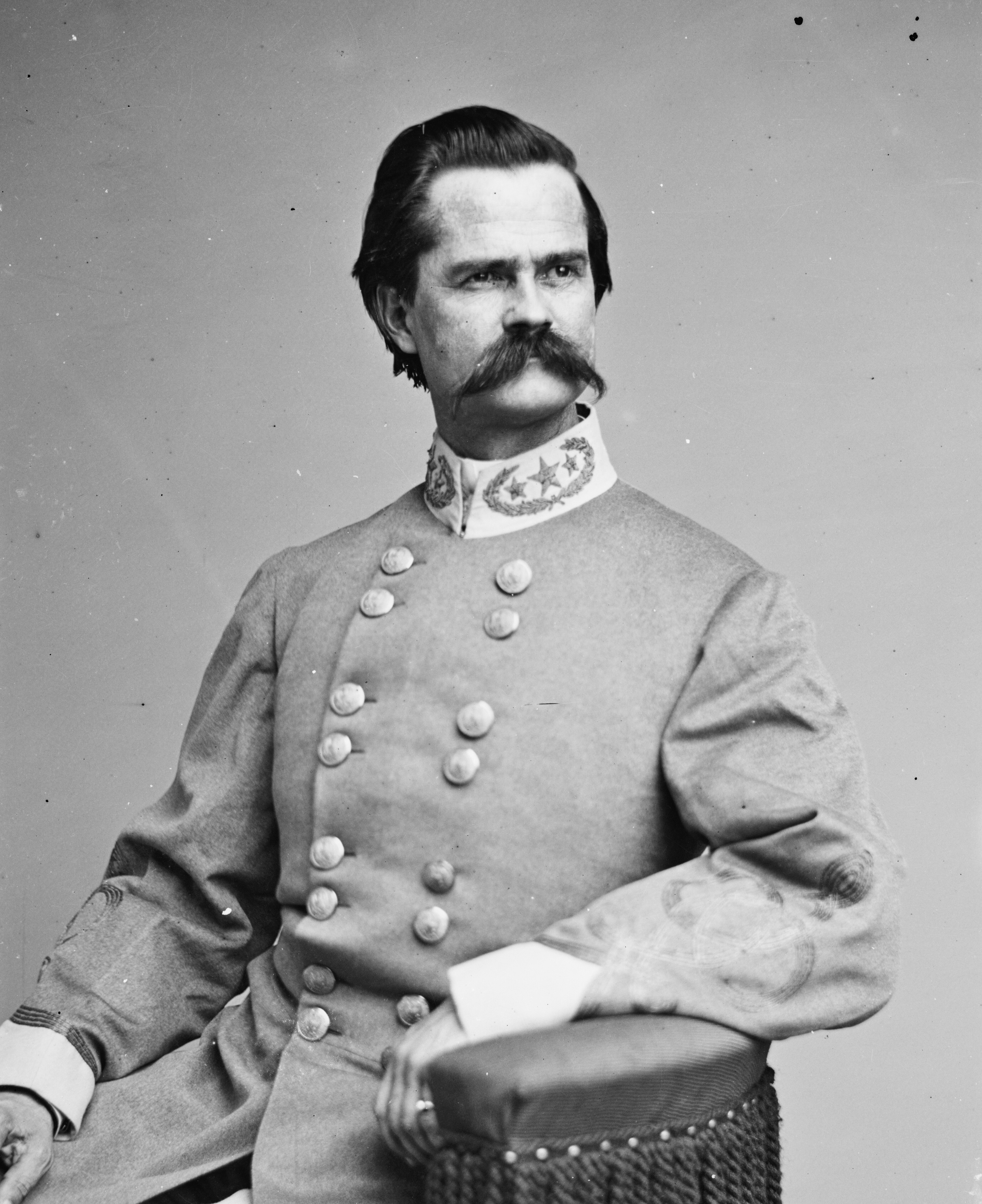
- Born: March 20, 1825; Bardstown, Kentucky
- Died: July 25, 1883 (aged 58); McMinnville, Tennessee
- Burial place: Mount Olivet Cemetery, Nashville, Tennessee
- Military career
- Allegiance: United States of America; Confederate States of America
- Branch: United States Army; Confederate States Army
- Service years: 1848–1861 (USA); 1861–1865 (CSA)
- Rank: Captain (USA); Brigadier General (CSA)
- Conflicts: American Civil War: Siege of Port Hudson

William Nelson Rector Beall (March 20, 1825 – July 25, 1883) was a brigadier general in the Confederate States Army during the American Civil War. He is most noted for his supply efforts on behalf of Confederate prisoners of war.

== Early life and career ==
William N. R. Beall was born in Bardstown, Kentucky on March 20, 1825. His parents moved from Kentucky to Little Rock, Arkansas where Beall was raised.

After graduating 30th in his class from the United States Military Academy in 1848, Beall was commissioned in the United States Army as a brevet second lieutenant with the U.S. 4th Infantry Regiment. He first served on the northwestern frontier. In 1849, he was promoted to second lieutenant and assigned to the Fifth Infantry, serving until 1855 in the Indian Territory and Texas. He was promoted to first lieutenant and then shortly thereafter to captain with the First Cavalry. Beall was involved in several skirmishes, combats, and expeditions against the Indian tribes in the West, primarily in Kansas. In 1860, he participated in a raid against the Kiowas and Comanches.

== Civil War ==
At the outbreak of the Civil War in 1861, Beall resigned his commission and was appointed as a captain of cavalry in the Confederate Army. Beall served in the Trans-Mississippi Department under General Earl Van Dorn early in the war and was appointed brigadier general in the spring of 1862. Beall was placed in command of the Confederate cavalry forces at Corinth, Mississippi. Beall then commanded a brigade of troops from Arkansas, Mississippi, Alabama and Louisiana. At the Siege of Port Hudson, the Confederate forces surrendered on July 9, 1863, and Beall was taken as a prisoner of war. He was imprisoned at Johnson's Island on Lake Erie near Sandusky, Ohio.

In 1864, Beall was appointed as a Confederate agent for the purpose of supplying Confederate prisoners of war and paroled for this purpose. He established an office in New York City and sold cotton allowed through the Union blockade of southern ports. The proceeds from these sales were used to purchase clothing and blankets for Confederate prisoners in northern prison camps. On January 3, 1865, Union General Henry Halleck wrote to General Ulysses Grant regarding Beall:

Since commencing this letter I learn that General Beall's course of conduct in New York has been so conspicuous and offensive that the Secretary of War has ordered his sign to be taken down. General Paine has also been directed to suspend his parole and take him in custody till the cotton arrives. The selection of General Beall was unfortunate, for he seems disposed to make all the trouble he can. His parole will be renewed the moment the cotton reaches New York.

Secretary of War Edwin M. Stanton suspended Beall's parole and placed him in Fort Lafayette in New York Harbor as a prisoner of war until the cotton safely arrived from Mobile, Alabama. He was finally released from Federal custody on August 2, 1865. After the war, he moved to St. Louis, Missouri and became a general commission merchant.

== Dates of rank ==
- Captain, September 1, 1861
- Brigadier General, April 11, 1862

== Postbellum ==
Beall died on July 25, 1883, in McMinnville, Tennessee. He is buried at Mount Olivet Cemetery in Nashville.

== See also ==
- List of American Civil War generals (Confederate)
