= 18th (Marmaduke's) Arkansas Infantry Regiment =

Infantry regiment of the Confederate States Army

18th Arkansas Infantry Regiment
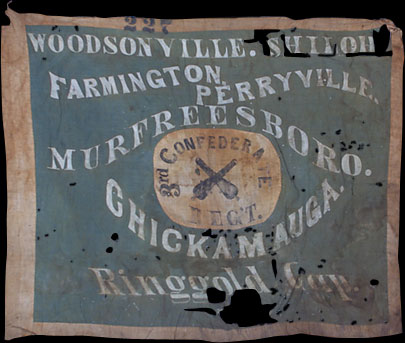
- Regimental color of the Third Confederate at the Old State House Museum in Little Rock, Arkansas
- Active: 1861–1865
- Disbanded: April 26, 1865
- Country: Confederate States
- Allegiance: Arkansas
- Branch: Army
- Type: Infantry
- Size: Regiment
- Nickname: "Marmaduke's regiment"
- Facings: Light blue
- Engagements: American Civil War: Battle of Rowlett's Station; Battle of Shiloh; Siege of Corinth; Battle of Richmond; Battle of Perryville; Battle of Murfreesboro; Battle of Liberty Gap; Battle of Chickamauga; Battle of Missionary Ridge; Battle of Ringgold Gap; Battle of Rocky Face Ridge; Battle of Resaca; Battle of New Hope Church; Battle of Pickett's Mill; Battle of Kennesaw Mountain; Battle of Peachtree Creek; Battle of Atlanta; Siege of Atlanta; Battle of Jonesboro; Battle of Franklin; Battle of Nashville; Battle of Bentonville

Commanders
- Notable commanders: Col. John S. Marmaduke; Col. James A. Smith

The 18th Arkansas Infantry Regiment or the 3rd Confederate Infantry Regiment (also known as "Marmaduke's regiment") was an infantry formation of the Confederate States Army in the Western Theater of the American Civil War.

The unit was also briefly identified as the 1st Arkansas Infantry Battalion. The unit was most often referred to as the 3rd Confederate Infantry Regiment. The designation "Confederate Infantry Regiment" was intended to convey the difference between Provisional Confederate Army units and Regular Confederate Army Units, with Provisional units being those regiments who received a state designation such as "XX Arkansas Infantry Regiment". In practice, the designation was most often utilized when Regiments were assembled utilizing companies from more than one Confederate state. The "3rd Confederate Infantry Regiment" is occasionally misidentified as the 3rd Arkansas Infantry Regiment commanded by Colonel Van H. Manning.

== Formation ==
The 18th Arkansas Infantry started out as 7 of 22 companies which comprised the so-called "Hindman Legion." Col. Thomas C. Hindman had recruited ten companies at his own expense for the 2nd Arkansas Infantry Regiment, and then an additional seven companies at his own expense which, along with four cavalry companies and an artillery battery, became known as the Hindman Legion. The "Legion" was not approved as an organization, and, after being mustered into the Confederate service on July 27, 1861, reverted to a regiment (the 2nd Arkansas Infantry Regiment), an infantry battalion (the 1st Arkansas Infantry Battalion) and a cavalry battalion (the 6th Arkansas Cavalry Battalion). Capt. John S. Marmaduke was assigned as commander of the 1st Arkansas Infantry Battalion and promoted to lieutenant-colonel on August 1, 1861.

A company from the 15th Tennessee Infantry Regiment was transferred to the 1st Arkansas Battalion, and two additional companies were added on December 18, 1861, which brought the battalion up to ten companies. On January 1, 1862, the unit was formally designated as a regiment, the 18th Arkansas Infantry, and Marmaduke was promoted to colonel. On January 31, 1862, the regiment was redesignated as the 3rd Confederate Infantry because it contained units from multiple states.

Adjutant and Inspector-General's Office,
Richmond, January 31, 1862.

XVIII. The designation of the hereinafter-named regiments (they being composed of companies from different States) are changed as follows: Col. John B. Villepigue's 36th Georgia to be known as the 1st Confederate Regiment; Col. J. D. Martin's 25th Mississippi to be known as the 2nd Confederate Regiment; Col. J. S. Marmaduke's 18th Arkansas to be known as the 3rd Confederate Regiment.
By command of the Secretary of War:
JNO. WITHERS,
Assistant Adjutant-General.

The 3rd Confederate Infantry was composed of the following companies:

- Company A – the "Little Rock Grays" – of Pulaski County, Arkansas, commanded by Captain James B. Johnson. This company was originally Company L, 1st Arkansas Infantry Battalion.
- Company B – the "Young Guard" – of Shelby County, Tennessee, commanded by Captain John F. Cameron.
- Company C – the "Fletcher Rifles" – of Mississippi County, Arkansas, commanded by Captain Elliot H. Fletcher Sr., This company was originally Company O, 1st Arkansas Infantry Battalion.
- Company D – the "Shamrock Guards" – of Warren County, Mississippi, commanded by Captain John H. Crump. This company was originally Company P, 1st Arkansas Infantry Battalion.
- Company E – the "Linden Dead-Shots" – of St. Francis County, Arkansas, commanded by Captain Poindexter Dunn. This company was originally organized as a volunteer militia company in the 19th Regiment, Arkansas State Militia, from St. Francis County, with militia commissions being issued to its officers on May 16, 1861. The company was assigned as Company Q, 1st Arkansas Infantry Battalion. This company was originally organized as a volunteer company in the 19th Regiment, Arkansas State Militia on May 16, 1861.
- Company F – the "Chalk Bluff Rebels" – of Greene County, Arkansas, commanded by Captain William Reed. This company was originally Company R, 1st Arkansas Infantry Battalion.
- Company G – the "Pine Bluff Artillery" – of Jefferson County, Arkansas, commanded by Captain Fredrick P. Steck. This company was originally Company S, 1st Arkansas Infantry Battalion. This company was originally organized as a volunteer artillery company in the 34th Regiment, Arkansas State Militia on April 21, 1861.
- Company H – the "Swamp Rangers" – of Warren County, Mississippi, commanded by Captain H. V. Keep. This company was originally Company T, 1st Arkansas Infantry Battalion. The company was consolidated with Company E on January 22, 1862.
- Company I – the "Burrowville Mountain Guards" – of Searcy County, Arkansas, commanded by Captain John J. Dawson. This company was originally Company(?), 1st Arkansas Infantry Battalion. The company was consolidated with Company A on April 23, 1862.
- Company K – the "Rector Guards" – of Searcy County, Arkansas, commanded by Captain Ira G. Robertson.

Note: Companies I and K were composed primarily of suspected members of the so-called Arkansas Peace Society, who were arrested and sent to Little Rock by members of the 45th Arkansas Militia Regiment, where they were given the choice of Confederate service or imprisonment. Most of the men were from Searcy County. The officers were non-Peace Society men appointed by the Governor.

== Service ==
Assigned to Hindman's Brigade, Hardee's Division in the Army of Central Kentucky from December 1861 through January 1862. The unit was involved in an engagement at Rowlett's Station, Kentucky, on December 17, 1861. Assigned to Hindman's (later Liddell's) brigade, Army of Mississippi in March, 1862 where it participated in the Battle of Shiloh on April 6–7, 1862 and in the Corinth Campaign from April through June of that year. At the battle of Shiloh the 3rd Confederate bore the guiding colors of Hindman's Brigade and captured the first prisoners of the day. Colonel Marmaduke was mentioned with praise in the official reports. In the second day's battle he was wounded and disabled, and while in hospital was recommended for promotion to the rank of brigadier-general. Colonel Marmaduke commanded his brigade of Arkansans during the Siege of Corinth, and later was ordered to the Department of the Trans-Mississippi.

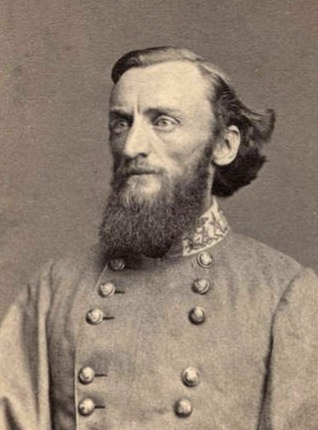
John S. Marmaduke

In early May 1862 the Confederate forces underwent an army-wide reorganization due to the passage of the Conscription Act by the Confederate Congress in April 1862. All twelve-month regiments had to re-muster and enlist for two additional years or the duration of the war; a new election of officers was ordered; and men who were exempted from service by age or other reasons under the Conscription Act were allowed to take a discharge and go home. Officers who did not choose to stand for re-election were also offered a discharge. The reorganization was accomplished among all the Arkansas regiments in and around Corinth, Mississippi, following the Battle of Shiloh.

In the reorganization of Confederate forces before the start of the Kentucky Campaign, the 3rd Confederate, now under the command of Lieutenant Colonel Henry Virtner Keep was assigned to Brigadier General Sterling A. M. Wood's 4th Brigade of Major General Simon Bolivar Buckner's 3rd Division of Major General William Joseph Hardee's Corps of the Army of Mississippi. The regiment participated in Battle of Perryville, Kentucky, in October 1862.

In November 1862, following the Kentucky Campaign, General Bragg united his Army of Mississippi and the General Kirby Smith's Army of Kentucky to create the Army of Tennessee. In the reorganization, Wood's Brigade, including the 3rd Confederate now under the command of Major John F. Cameron, was assigned to Cleburne's Division and fought in the Battle of Stones River. Major J. F. Cameron filed the after action report of the 3rd Confederate Infantry following the battle of Stone's River (Murfreesboro):

Report of Maj. J. F. Cameron, Third Confederate Infantry.

MANCHESTER, TENN., January 5, 1863.

SIR: I have the honor to make the following report of killed, wounded, missing, and prisoners belonging to the Third Confederate Regiment, together with the part taken by my command, in action at Murfreesborough December 31, 1862:

My command took position on the left of the brigade on Tuesday, [December] 30, and remained on the field until the army fell back.

During the engagement of Wednesday fought in line of battle, but finding my command more efficient when deployed, I moved in front of the brigade about 12 o'clock Wednesday. The brigade was ordered to charge the enemy, strongly posted in a skirt of timber some 500 yards distant, a corn-field intervening. Having no support, it was repulsed. I withdrew my command under cover of a captured hospital, when I reorganized my regiment and rejoined my brigade. During the afternoon the brigade was ordered to the support of Gen. Johnson, being too much to the left of that command. The enemy immediately appeared in our front. I deployed my regiment on the right of the fourth company and opened fire. The enemy's line was posted behind a fence. With the aid of 50 straggles, I charged the fence, driving the enemy, capturing their colors and about 30 prisoners. The brigade then opened up upon the retreating Abolitionists, killing great numbers.

My command being much reduced, Gen. Wood honored me with a position on his staff during the fight of Thursday, Friday, and Saturday.

The conduct of both officers and men of my command, without exception, was worthy of all praise. I would call the attention of the general to the conduct of Lieut. Frank Foster, jr., of the Forty-fifth Mississippi Regt. Ever by my side, he displayed great gallantry and coolness. Seizing the standard, he rallied hundreds of panic-stricken men, thereby reforming our then thin ranks.

Lieut. [H. H.] Davis, Company E, was badly wounded and left at hospital at Murfreesborough. All the remainder of my wounded are within our lines.

Very respectfully,

J. F. CAMERON, Maj., Cmdg.

Capt. O. S. PALMER, Assistant Adjutant-Gen.

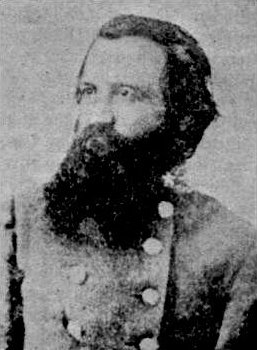
Colonel James A. Smith

By the time of the Battle of Chickamauga, the 3rd Confederate had been field consolidated with the 5th Confederate Infantry due to battle losses and placed under the command of Colonel James A. Smith. The consolidated 3rd/5th Confederate Infantry was assigned to the brigade of Brigadier General Lucius E. Polk in Cleburn's Division of the Army of Tennessee.

Report of Col. J. A. Smith, Fifth Confederate Infantry,

commanding Third and Fifth Confederate Infantry.

HDQRS. THIRD AND FIFTH CONFEDERATE REGTS., Near Chattanooga, October 5, 1863.

SIR: I have the honor to submit the following report of the part taken by my regiment in the battle of September 19 and 20, on Chickamauga Creek:

The regiment entered the action first on the 19th with the brigade about sundown, passing over the Sixth and Seventh Arkansas Regt.'s, of Liddell's brigade, which were lying down. We had proceeded but a short distance to the front when the enemy opened fire on our sharpshooters. They were immediately withdrawn. The enemy's artillery opened destructive fire on our advancing lines, which together with fire from infantry behind temporary works, stopped us for a short time. The right of the brigade, however, meeting with less resistance, pushed on, and getting on his flank he soon retired in confusion, leaving a 12-pounder James gun and a caisson, having set another on fire.

I was here directed by Lieut.-Gen. Hill to halt my regiment, as it had, by directing itself on Wood's brigade, become somewhat detached from the remainder of the brigade. This ended the contest for to night, most of the fighting having been done since dark. My loss in this affair was about 25 men, most of them [receiving] slight wounds.

We remained in line during the night of the 19th, replenished our supply of ammunition, and were ready to move again at daylight. We were not, however, engaged until about 10 o'clock on the 20th, having received our rations from the rear in the meantime.

When the attack was renewed we met the enemy at his works, which were located on the crest of a rise that commanded the space in front of it. The strife at this point was fearful. Such showers of grape, canister, and small-arms I have never before witnessed. We remained here until our supply of ammunition was exhausted without losing or gaining ground. Through the misapprehension of an order, or from some other cause unknown to me, the right of my regiment gave way, and it was with some difficulty that order was restored and the line re-established. Failing as we did to drive the enemy from his position, and our ammunition being exhausted, we were ordered by Brig.-Gen. Polk to fall back.

Our loss in this engagement was very heavy. Among the fallen was Capt. W. J. Morris, a brave and worthy officer. He died of his wounds a few days after. We next attacked our stubborn foe about 4 o'clock in the evening, and some 400 or 500 yards to the right of our position in the morning. His resistance here was, for long, as obstinate as in the morning; but we finally proved too much for him, and he took refuge behind his second line of works, about 200 yards to the rear of his first. He made but a short stand here and then fled in confusion across the open field in rear, leaving many prisoners in our hands.

In this last engagement the loss of the regiment was heavier than in either of those that preceded it. It was here that Capt. George Moore, of Company H, was instantly killed by a cannon ball. Capt. James [H.] Beard, the best and bravest soldier I ever saw, was mortally wounded. Many other true and gallant men likewise fell here.

Among the survivors conspicuous for their gallantry and good conduct I would mention Maj. R. J. Person, Capt. M. H. Dixon, Adjt. M. M. Smith, and Liuet. O. H. Smith. A list of the killed, wounded, and missing has already been furnished.

I am, sir, very respectfully, your obedient servant,

J. A. SMITH Col., Comdg., Third and Fifth Confederate Regts.

Capt. W. A. KING. Assistant Adjutant-Gen., Polk's Brigade.

Report of Capt. M. H. Dixon, Third Confederate Infantry, commanding Third and Fifth Confederate Infantry.

HDQRS. THIRD AND FIFTH CONFEDERATE REGIMENTS., December 2, 1863.

SIR: From a position behind what I learned to be Taylor's Ridge, covering the road and railroad bridge, the regiment advanced in line of battle some 300 or 400 yards to the summit of the hill. Our sharpshooters encountered the enemy's, and immediately after he appeared in line of battle, making his way up the opposite steep. The firing was opened on both sides, and continued for about three-quarters of an hour, the enemy pressing with great obstinacy and perseverance in the face of the continuous fire until he was within 30 or 40 yards of our line, the more adventurous and daring leading to within that number of feet. These were mostly killed or wounded and captured. After sustaining, as he must have done, a heavy loss the enemy broke and fled down the hill.

Our loss, 2 killed and 17 wounded. Among the latter, Lieut. Col. J. C. Cole, who was shot-and believed mortally-while directing and encouraging his men. Upon the fall of Lieut.-Col. Cole, the command devolved upon Capt. W. A. Brown, senior officer present, until my arrival with a detachment of the regiment ordered to guard Shallow Ford Bridge.

The officers distinguished for gallant bearing are Capt. Brown, Lieut.'s R. H. Hayes, E. H. Fite, and Sergt. Maj. W. B. Clark.

I have the honor, to be, very respectfully, your obedient servant,

M. H. DIXON, Capt., Comdg. Third and Fifth Confederate Regiments.

Capt. W. A. KING,

Assistant adjutant-Gen.

When General Joseph E. Johnston assumed command of the Army of Tennessee to oppose General Sherman's Atlanta campaign, the 3rd Confederate was assigned to Govan's Brigade. The 3rd Confederate participated in the battles of Dalton, Resaca, New Hope Church, Kennesaw Mountain, Atlanta, and the Siege of Atlanta. During the Battle of Atlanta on July 22, 1864, the 3rd Confederate had only 62 effectives and reported 9 casualties.

The regiment and it colors were captured, along with much of Govan's Brigade at the Battle of Jonesboro, Georgia, on Sept. 1, 1864. Due to a special cartel between Union General Sherman and Confederate General John B. Hood, the unit was quickly paroled and exchanged for Union prisoner held at Andersonville Prison. The regiment re-entered service approximately a month later.

The 3rd Arkansas and the rest of Govan's Brigade were released and exchanged just in time to participate in General John B. Hood's disastrous Franklin-Nashville Campaign. Brigade effective strength was approximately 550, plus or minus a dozen or so, so each battalion fielded around 100-110 rifles. The 3rd Confederate had 47 men left on the march into Franklin and so the 3rd found itself once again consolidated with the 5th Confederate Infantry under the command of Lieutenant Colonel E.A. Howell. The remnants of Govan's Brigade that survived the Tennessee Campaign remained with the Army of Tennessee through its final engagements in the 1865 Carolinas campaign.

== Consolidation and Surrender ==
The remnants of ten depleted Arkansas regiments, along with one mostly Arkansas regiment, in the Army of Tennessee were consolidated into a single regiment at Smithfield, North Carolina, on April 9, 1865. The 1st Arkansas, was lumped together with the 2nd, 5th, 6th, 7th, 8th, 15th, 19th and 24th Arkansas Infantry Regiments and the 3rd Confederate Infantry Regiment as the 1st Arkansas Consolidated Infantry on April 9, 1865. On April 26, 1865, the 1st Arkansas Consolidated Infantry Regiment was present with the Army of Tennessee when it surrendered in Greensboro, North Carolina.

== Regimental color ==
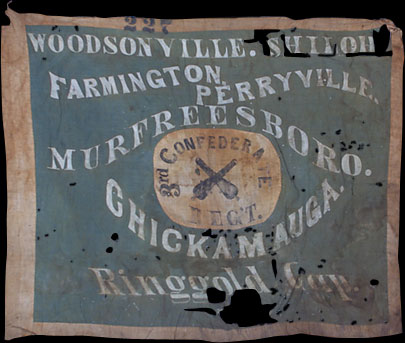
Regimental color of the Third Confederate Infantry Regiment

This flag was issued in the spring of 1864 and bears characteristics similar to the other Hardee pattern flags issued to the division of Major General Patrick Cleburne, Army of Tennessee. It was captured on September 1, 1864, by the 113th Ohio Volunteer Infantry at the Battle of Jonesboro, Georgia. In his report dated September 10, 1864 Captain Toland Jones noted that "we captured the battle-flag of the Third Confederate Infantry Regiment inscribed with the names of seven different battles." The flag was eventually forwarded to the U.S. War Department where it was assigned Capture Number 227. The flag was mistakenly identified as belonging to an Alabama unit and when the Confederate battleflags were returned to the states in 1905, the flag was mistakenly returned to Alabama. In 2001, the flag was transferred to the Old State House Museum in Little Rock, Arkansas.

== Battle participation ==
The 3rd Confederate Infantry took part in the following battles:

- Battle of Rowlett's Station, Kentucky, December 17, 1861.
- Battle of Shiloh, Tennessee, April 6–7, 1862.
- Siege of Corinth, April to June 1862.
- Kentucky Campaign, Kentucky, August–October, 1862.
  - Battle of Perryville, Kentucky, October 8, 1862.
- Battle of Murfreesboro, Tennessee, December 31, 1862, to January 3, 1863.
- Tullahoma Campaign, June 1863.
  - Battle of Liberty Gap, Tennessee, June 24–26, 1863.
- Chickamauga Campaign, Georgia, August–September, 1863.
  - Battle of Chickamauga, Georgia, September 19–20, 1863.
- Chattanooga campaign, September to November 1863.
  - Battle of Missionary Ridge, Tennessee, November 25, 1863.
  - Battle of Ringgold Gap, Georgia, November 27, 1863.
- Atlanta campaign, May to September 1864.
  - Battle of Rocky Face Ridge, Georgia, May 5–11, 1864.
  - Battle of Resaca, Georgia, May 14–15, 1864.
  - Battle of New Hope Church, Georgia, May 25 - June 4, 1864.
  - Battle of Pickett's Mill, Georgina, May 27, 1864.
  - Battle of Kennesaw Mountain, Georgia, June 27, 1864.
  - Battle of Peachtree Creek, Georgia, July 20, 1864.
  - Siege of Atlanta, Georgia, July 22, 1864.
  - Battle of Jonesboro, Georgia, August 31 to September 1, 1864.
- Franklin–Nashville Campaign, Alabama, Georgia and Tennessee, September 18 to December 27, 1864.
  - Battle of Spring Hill, Tennessee, November 29, 1864.
  - Battle of Franklin, Tennessee, November 30, 1864.
  - Battle of Nashville, Tennessee, December 15–16, 1864.
- Carolinas campaign, February to April 1865.
  - Battle of Bentonville, North Carolina, March 19–21, 1865.

== See also ==
- Lists of American Civil War Regiments by State
- List of Confederate units from Arkansas
