= 12th Arkansas Infantry Regiment =

- Active: 1861–1865
- Disbanded: May 26, 1865
- Country: Confederate States
- Allegiance: Arkansas
- Branch: Army
- Type: Infantry
- Size: Regiment
- Facings: Light blue
- Engagements: American Civil War: Battle of Island Number Ten; Battle of Port Hudson

The 12th Arkansas Infantry (1861–1865) was a Confederate Army infantry regiment during the American Civil War. The regiment spent much of its service defending Confederate strong points along the Mississippi River. The unit participated in the defense of Island No. 10 in early 1862 and later became part of the garrison of Port Hudson in 1863. Following the capitulation of the garrison of Port Hudson, the survivors of the 12th were eventually paroled and exchanged back to Arkansas where the regiment was consolidated with the remnants of several other Arkansas regiments to become the 2nd Arkansas Consolidated Infantry Regiment.

== Organization ==
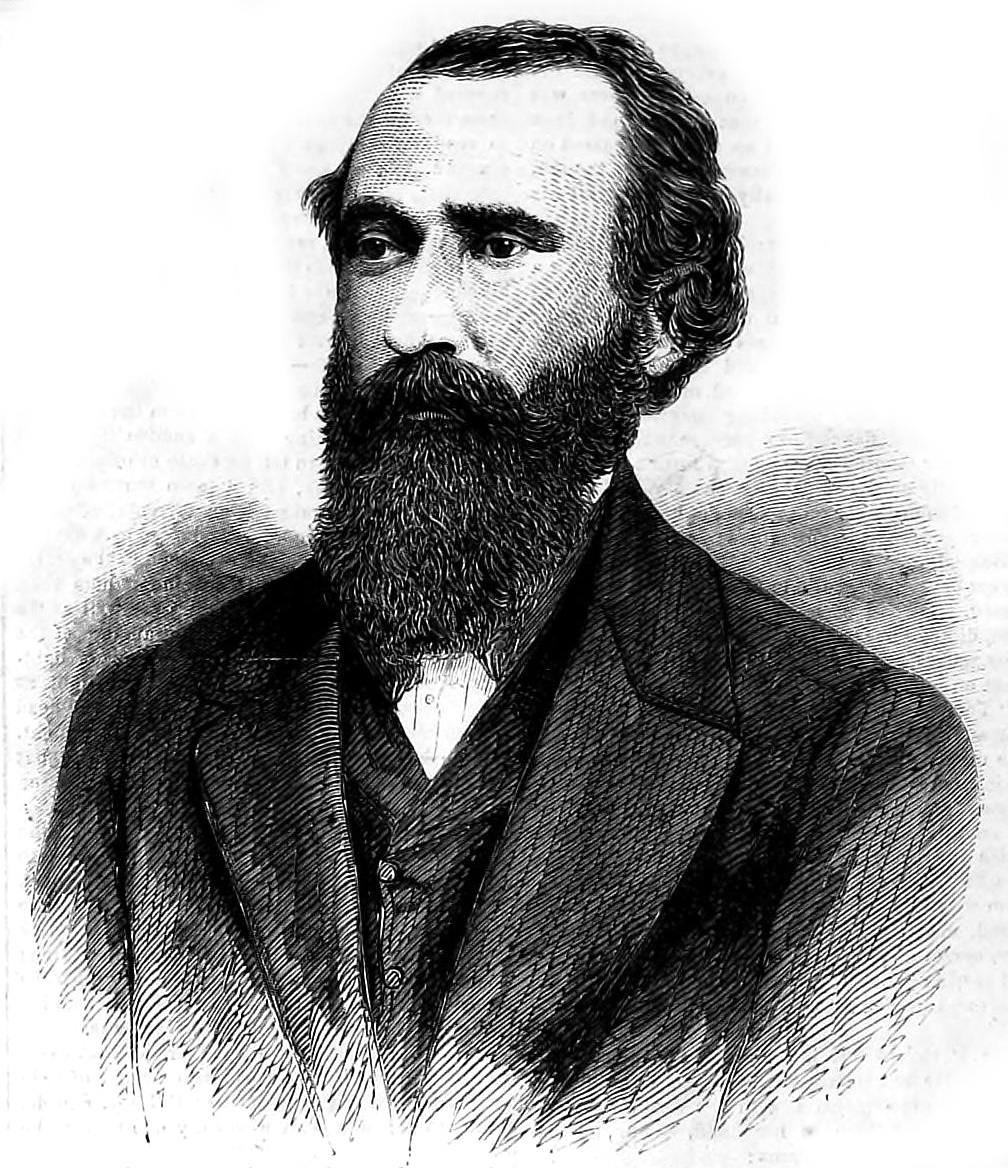
Colonel Edward W. Gantt

12th Infantry Regiment was organized July 27, 1861, by Edward W. Gantt. Many of the men were recruited in Dallas County. Gantt had been a close political ally of Congressman Thomas Hindman and s staunch supporter of secession before the war. He was elected to Congress in 1860 but never took his seat due to secession. The original regimental officers were:.

Colonel Edward W. Gantt

Lieutenant Colonels W.D.S. Cook

Major T.J. Reid Jr.

A.S.A. A.S. Saunder

Chaplain A.R. Winfield

A.C.S. Will P. Donnell

Aq. M. E. C. Jordon

Adjutant William M. Bruce.

The unit was composed of volunteer companies from the following counties:

- Company A – Commanded by Captain J.M. Ruffin, organized in Clark County, Arkansas. 24 men from this company would eventually be enlisted in Company E, 33rd Arkansas Infantry Regiment.
- Company B – the "Arkansas Toothpicks" – commanded by Captain G.A. Hale, organized in Clark County, Arkansas. 23 men from this company were enlisted in Company H, 33rd Arkansas Infantry regiment.
- Company C – the "Ouachita Guard", commanded by Captain H.W.L. Johnson, organized in Ouachita County, Arkansas. This company was originally organized as a volunteer company, under the command of Captain Joseph R. White in the 39th Regiment, Arkansas State Militia, Ouachita County on June 3, 1861. in the summer of 1862, some of the absentees from this company were enlisted in company F, 33rd Arkansas Infantry Regiment.
- Company D – the "Holly Springs Targeteers" – commanded by Captain E. Chandler, organized in Dallas County, Arkansas. This company was originally organized as a volunteer company, in the 46th Regiment, Arkansas State Militia, Dallas County, on May 30, 1861. Virtually all of this company escaped capture at Island No. 10 and was reassigned a Company F, 6th Arkansas Infantry until the regiment was reformed.
- Company E – the "Hot Springs Rifles" – commanded by Captain Thomas Glasgow, organized in Hot Spring County, Arkansas.
- Company F – the "Jackson Minute-Men" – commanded by Captain J.C. Brewer, organized in Jackson Township of Dallas County, Arkansas.
- Company G – the "Southern Flag Company" – commanded by Captain B. Abernithy, organized in Sevier County, Arkansas. This unit was originally organized as a volunteer company of the 37th Regiment, Arkansas State Militia.
- Company H – the "Red River Mounted Riflemen" Commanded by Captain A.C. Lovett, organized in Sevier County, Arkansas.This unit was originally organized as a volunteer company of the 37th Regiment, Arkansas State Militia. Several men from this company escaped capture and were re-enlisted in Company H, 33rd Arkansas Infantry Regiment.
- Company I – Commanded by Captain Mathew Archer, organized in Dallas County, Arkansas.
- Company K – the "Southern Defenders" – commanded by Captain Josh B. Davis, organized in Hempstead County, Arkansas. Several men from this company were enlisted in Company F, 24th Arkansas Infantry in the summer of 1862.

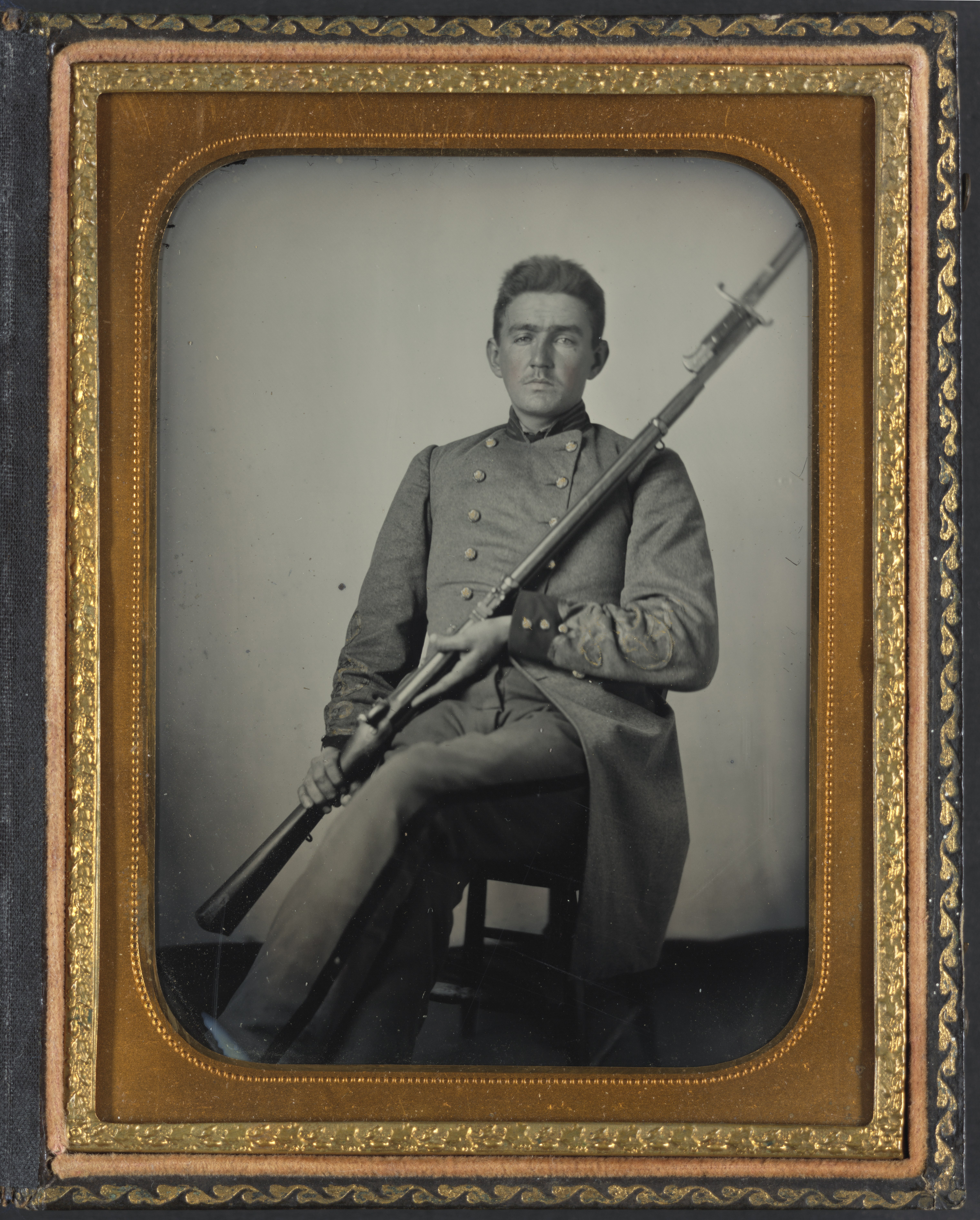
Captain Daniel Turrentine of Company G, 12th Arkansas Infantry Regiment

== Service ==
The 12th Arkansas served in the Western Department, and later at Beall's Brigade, Department of Mississippi and East Louisiana. The regiment had the unfortunate distinction of being captured in two engagements: Battle of Island Number Ten, and the Siege of Port Hudson.

=== Island Number Ten ===
After serving in the garrison at Columbus Kentucky, the regiment moved to New Madrid, Missouri. Island Number Ten was a strategic location with an island at the base of a tight double turn in the course of the Mississippi river, near the town of New Madrid, Missouri. The 12th Arkansas, brigaded together with the 11th Arkansas Infantry, under the command of Colonel Gantt, originally acted as the garrison for Fort Thompson, one of two forts that guarded New Madrid. Due to his role as a brigade commander, On December 7, 1861, General Leonidas Polk nominated Gantt to become a Brigadier General, but he was never confirmed at that rank by the Confederate Congress. Union forces began a siege in March 1862, shortly after the Confederate Army abandoned their position at Columbus, Kentucky. The Union Army of the Mississippi under Brigadier General John Pope, made the first probes, coming overland through Missouri and occupying the town of Point Pleasant, Missouri, almost directly west of the island and south of New Madrid. Pope's army then moved north and soon brought siege guns to bear on New Madrid. The Confederate commander, Brig. Gen. John P. McCown, decided to evacuate the town after only one day of heavy bombardment, moving most of his troops to Island No. 10, abandoning his heavy artillery and most of his supplies. Gantt's Brigade now included the 11th and 12 Arkansas Infantry Regiments, the 4th Arkansas Infantry Battalion, may of whom were manning guns on Island No. 10. and the 55th Tennessee Infantry Regiment. Two days after the fall of New Madrid, Union gunboats and mortar rafts sailed downstream to attack Island Number Ten. Over the next three weeks, the island's defenders and forces in the nearby supporting batteries were subjected to a steady bombardment by the flotilla, mostly carried out by the mortars. At the same time, the Union forces at New Madrid were digging a canal across the neck of land east of the town to bypass Island No. 10. Several transports were sent to the Army of the Mississippi when the canal was finished, which provided the army with a way to cross the river and attack the Confederate troops on the Tennessee side. Pope persuaded Flag Officer Andrew Hull Foote to send a gunboat past the batteries, to assist him in crossing the river by keeping off any Southern gunboats and suppressing Confederate artillery fire at the point of attack. The USS Carondelet, under Commander Henry Walke, slipped past the island on the night of April 4, 1862. This was followed by the USS Pittsburg, under Lieutenant Egbert Thompson two nights later. With the support of these two gunboats, Pope was able to move his army across the river and trap the Confederates opposite the island, who by now were trying to retreat. Outnumbered at least three to one, the Confederates realized their situation was hopeless and decided to surrender. The bulk of the 12th Arkansas was captured at Island Number Ten and sent to prisoner of war camps with the other captured regiments from that post. At the prison camps, they joined with those regiments previously captured at Ft Donelson. As was the case with other regiments, there were escapees from the surrender of Island Number Ten, including those in hospital or on detached duty, etc. The members of the 12th Arkansas who avoided capture at Island Number Ten were consolidated into two companies assigned on June 16, 1862, as second companies D and F of the 6th Arkansas Infantry Regiment. These two companies from the 12th Arkansas, accompanied the 6th Arkansas on Bragg's Kentucky campaign. The two companies that accompanied the 6th Arkansas on the Kentucky Campaign were unable to rejoin the exchanged regiment until about December 1862: Still other escapees of the 12th Arkansas were consolidated with the 14th and 23rd Arkansas regiments on September 10, 1862, at Saltillo, MS, to form the 12th/14th/23rd Arkansas consolidated regiment.

Prisoners of the 12th Arkansas were delivered to Vicksburg, Mississippi, on or about September 16, and/or September 23, 1862. The regiment was then reorganized by the election of new officers on October 2, 1862, at Jackson, Mississippi. The 12th Arkansas was officially "exchanged" on November 10, 1862. Because Col. Gantt was confined as a prisoner at Fort Warren, when the 12th Arkansas was exchanged and reorganized at Jackson, T. J. Reid Jr, was elect to the Colonelcy. The other regimental officers elected at the reorganization were:

- Lieutenant Colonel Ed Jordan
- Major Walker
- Adjutant Hemingway
- Quartermaster Jonas

The company commanders elected in this new organization were:

- Company A, Captain Stewart
- Company B, Captain Donnell
- Company C, Captain Johnson
- Company D, Captain Linzee
- Company E, Captain Glasgow
- Company F, Captain Bowen
- Company G, Captain Doggett
- Company H, Captain J.E. Inge
- Company I, Captain Archer
- Company K, Captain Davis

After the surrender of Island Number Ten, many of the soldiers refused to return to the command. A number of soldier returned to Arkansas and were caught up in Major General Thomas Hindman's aggressive recruiting and conscription efforts in the summer if 1862 and were enlisted into the newly formed 33rd Arkansas Infantry Regiment. There were too few men to bring the regiment up to effective strength, so the officers were granted leave to return to Arkansas to recruit replacements, while the enlisted men were temporarily attached to the 11th Arkansas under the command of Colonel Logan. When the officers returned to the regiment, the added recruits brought its strength up to approximately 500 men in the ranks. Colonel Gantt remained imprisoned until where he stayed until his negotiated release in August 1862. He then returned to south Arkansas and awaited the offer of a new command, but this offer never came. Apparently Gantt had been criticized for drinking and flirting with officers wives. After waiting for more than a year for the offer of a new commission in the Confederate Army, Gantt, surrendered himself to General Grant at Vicksburg and quickly became a force in the move to organize a new loyal, pro Union Government in Arkansas. Following the war, during Reconstruction, he would become general superintendent of the Southwest District of Arkansas of the Freedmen's Bureau, a federal agency created at the end of the war to help former slaves.

=== Port Hudson ===
The reorganized regiment underwent several field consolidations during the months following its exchanged and was eventually incorporated the garrison of Port Hudson, on the Mississippi river. The regiment, once it regained sufficient strength to operate independently, became a part of Brig. Genl. William Beall's Center Brigade in the Port Hudson entrenchments. The regiment endured forty-eight day siege, and was surrendered to General Nathaniel P. Banks on July 9, 1863. Following the capitulation of Port Hudson, the enlisted men were paroled, but the officers were sent to Johnson's Island.

=== Camden Expedition, Red River Campaign ===
There are few records of the 12th Arkansas after the fall of Port Hudson. After being paroled, the enlisted personnel of the 12th Arkansas made their way to parole camps near Camden in south Arkansas and were eventually declared exchanged. They served as mounted infantry as a part of Colonel Thomas Pleasant Dockery's Brigade during the Camden Expedition in the Spring of 1864. As part of Dockery's Brigade, remnants of the regiment saw action at the Battles of Prairie D'Ane, Marks' Mills, and Jenkins Ferry.

=== Final year of the war ===
In the summer of 1864, the survivors of the 12th Arkansas were consolidated with the remains of several other regiments surrendered at Port Hudson or at the Siege of Vicksburg and formed into the 2nd Arkansas Consolidated Infantry Regiment. T. J. Reid Jr, originally from the 12th Arkansas, became the Colonel of the new consolidated regiment. The consolidated regiment was assigned along with the 1st and 3rd Arkansas Consolidated Infantry Regiments to the 2nd (McNair's) Arkansas Brigade, 1st (Churchill's) Arkansas Division, 2nd Corps, Trans-Mississippi Department, from September 1864 to May 1865.

On 22 January 1865, Major General Churchill was ordered to move his division to Minden, Louisiana, and occupy winter quarters. Union commanders in the Department of the Gulf reported on March 20, 1865, that General McNair's brigade was located at Minden, Louisiana, with the rest of Churchill's Division. In early April 1865, the division concentrated near Shreveport Louisiana, and then moved to Marshall Texas by mid April 1865.

=== Campaign Credit ===
The 12th Arkansas participated in the following engagements:

- Battle of Island Number Ten
- Siege of Port Hudson, May 22–July 9, 1863
- Camden Expedition, March 23–May 2, 1864.
  - Battle of Mount Elba, March 30, 1863
  - Battle of Prairie D'Ane, April 9–13, 1864
  - Battle of Marks' Mills, April 25, 1864
  - Battle of Jenkins Ferry, April 30, 1864

== Surrender ==
The 2nd Arkansas Consolidated Infantry was surrendered with the Department of the Trans-Mississippi, General Kirby Smith commanding, May 26, 1865. When the Trans-Mississippi Department surrendered, most of the Arkansas infantry regiments were encamped in and around Marshall, Texas (war-ravaged Arkansas no longer being able to subsist the army). The regiments were ordered to report to Shreveport, Louisiana, to be paroled. Virtually none of them did so. Some soldiers went to Shreveport on their own to be paroled, but for the most part, the regiments simply disbanded without formally surrendering. A company or two managed to keep together until they got home.

== See also ==
- List of Confederate units from Arkansas
