= Western theater of the American Civil War =

American Civil War area of operations

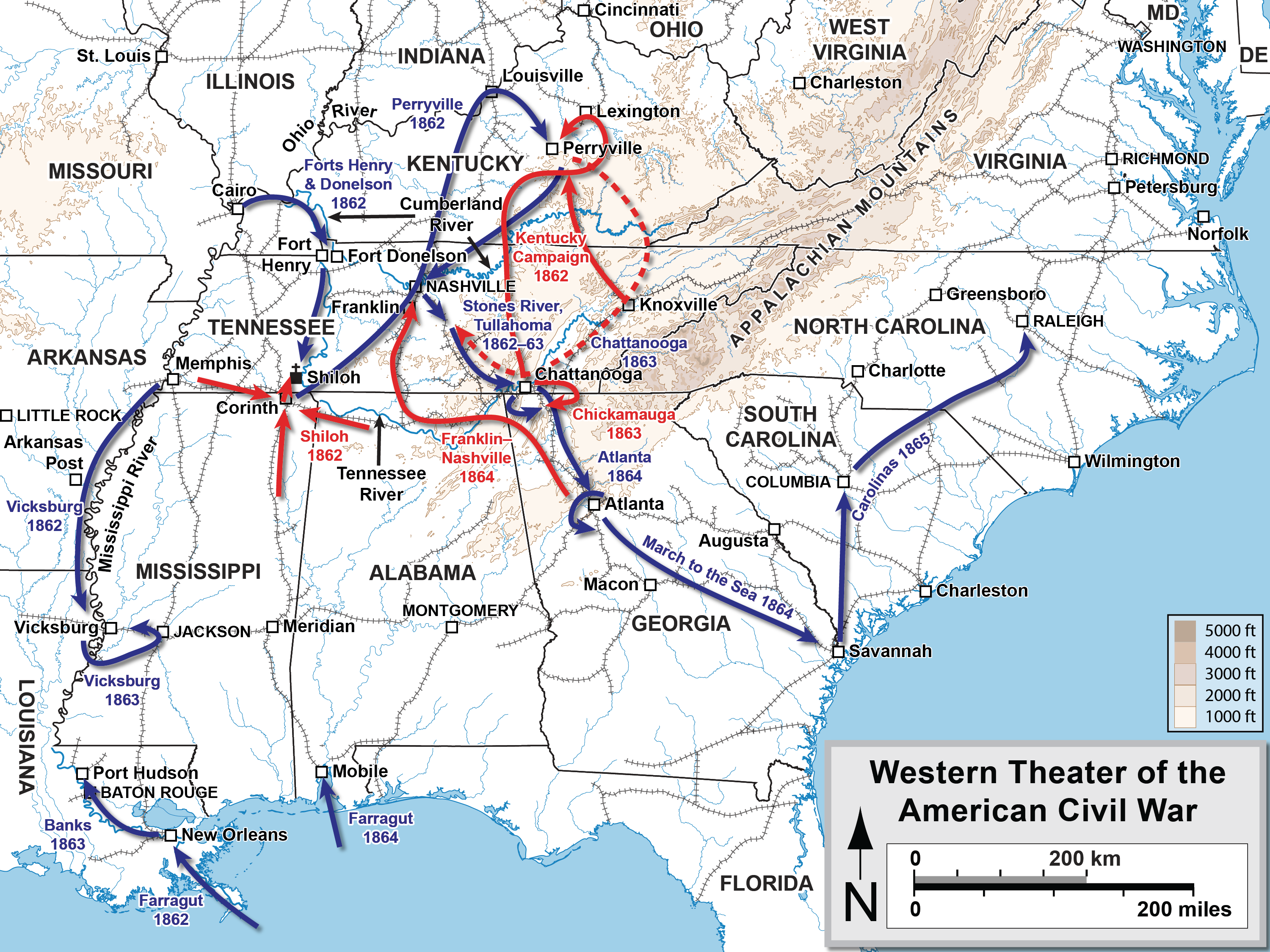
Western Theater Overview (1861–1865) Confederate Union

The western theater of the American Civil War encompassed major military operations in the states of Alabama, Georgia, Florida, Mississippi, North Carolina, Kentucky, South Carolina and Tennessee, as well as Louisiana east of the Mississippi River. Operations on the coasts of these states, except for Mobile Bay, are considered part of the lower seaboard theater. Most other operations east of the Appalachian Mountains are part of the eastern theater. Operations west of the Mississippi River took place in the trans-Mississippi theater.

The western theater served as an avenue of military operations by Union armies directly into the agricultural heartland of the South via the major rivers of the region (the Mississippi, the Tennessee, and the Cumberland). The Confederacy was forced to defend an enormous area with limited resources. Most railroads ran from north to south, as opposed to east to west, making it difficult to send Confederate reinforcements and supplies to troops further from the more heavily populated and industrialized areas of the eastern Confederacy.

Union operations began in September 1861 with attempts to secure Kentucky, as more than half of the state was under Confederate control by late 1861 into 1862. Maj. Gen. Ulysses S. Grant's Army of the Tennessee had early successes in Kentucky and western Tennessee in 1861 and 1862, capturing the important strategic locations of Forts Henry and Donelson. The Army of the Tennessee and the Army of the Ohio defeated the Confederate Army of Mississippi, commanded by General Albert Sidney Johnston, at the Battle of Shiloh, driving it out of western Tennessee and subsequently marching into Mississippi and capturing Corinth. Grant's troops marched towards and captured Vicksburg in 1862–1863. Meanwhile, the Army of the Ohio experienced success, blocking a Confederate invasion of Kentucky and gaining control over large amounts of Tennessee through the Battle of Stones River and the 1863 Tullahoma Campaign while fighting against the Confederate Army of Tennessee, whose commander, Braxton Bragg, was often criticized for a perceived lack of military skill.

The Union army was briefly checked in its invasion of Georgia at the Battle of Chickamauga, and besieged at Chattanooga. Grant, now commanding the newly created Military Division of the Mississippi, took command, and received reinforcements from the Army of the Tennessee, as well as from the eastern Army of the Potomac. The siege of Chattanooga was lifted in November 1863. Following his elevation by Abraham Lincoln to General-in-Chief, Grant put Maj. Gen. William Tecumseh Sherman in charge of the combined armies. Chattanooga served as a launching pad for Sherman to capture the Confederate rail-hub of Atlanta and to march to the Atlantic, inflicting a major logistical and psychological blow to the Confederacy. After reaching the ocean, Sherman invaded the Carolinas. Operations in the western theater concluded with the surrender of Southern forces to the Union armies in North Carolina and Florida in May 1865 following General Robert E. Lee's surrender to Grant at Appomattox Court House.

The western theater typically receives less attention than the eastern theater. This has much to do with the greater proximity of action in the east to capitals and to major population centers. However, some historians consider it the war's most important theater. While the eastern theater essentially remained in stalemate until 1864, Union troops in the west, beginning in 1861, were able to steadily surround and drive back the Confederate troops, forcing them into eventual capitulation. This was done through a steady series of Union victories in major battles, interrupted by only a single defeat, which took place at Chickamauga.

== Theater of operations ==
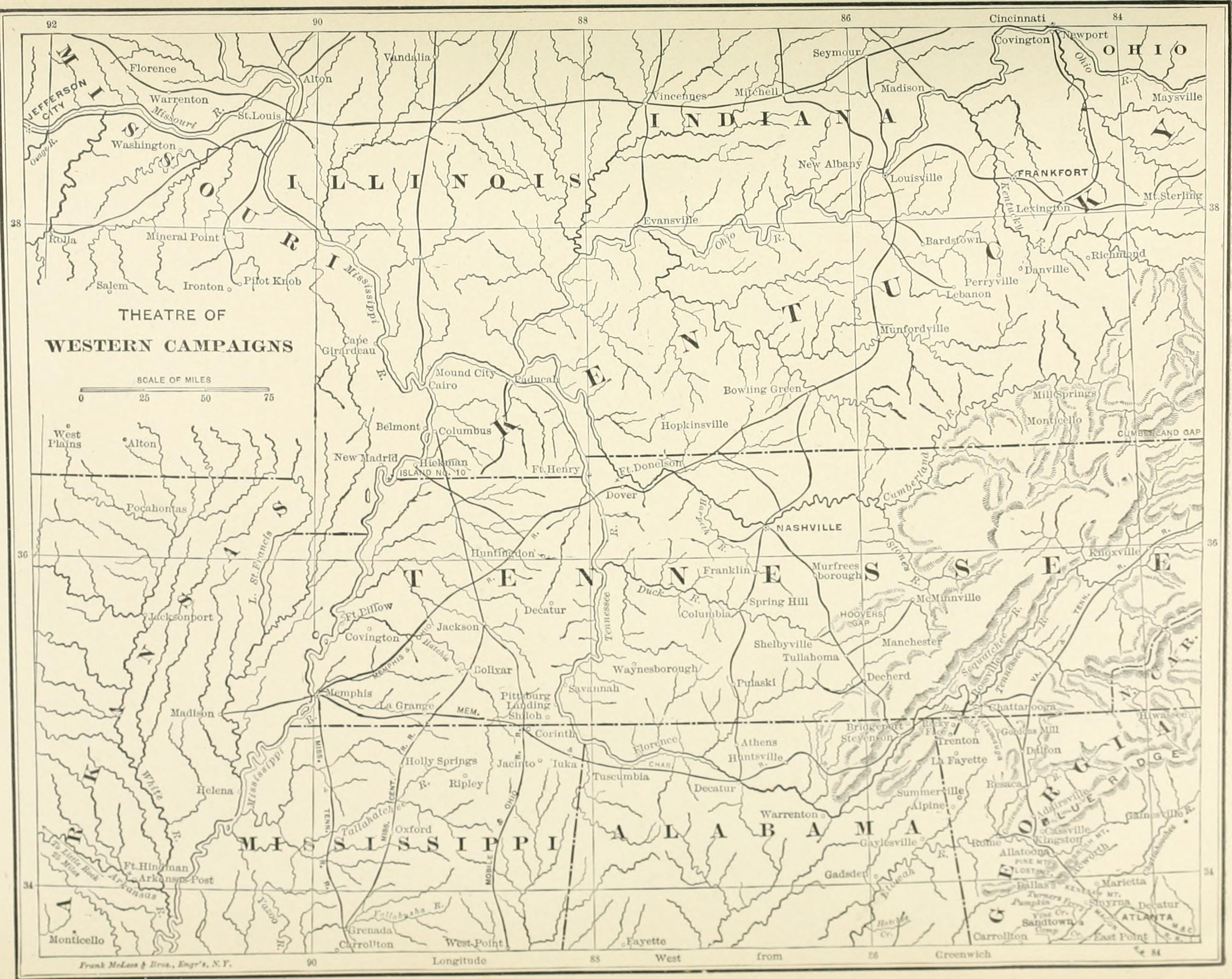
Western theater map at The Photographic History of the Civil War

The western theater was an area defined by both geography and the sequence of campaigning. It originally represented the area east of the Mississippi River and west of the Appalachian Mountains. It excluded operations against the Gulf Coast and the Eastern Seaboard, but as the war progressed and William Tecumseh Sherman's Union armies moved southeast from Chattanooga, Tennessee in 1864 and 1865, the definition of the theater expanded to encompass their operations into Georgia and the Carolinas.

The Virginia front was by far the more prestigious theater. ... Yet the war's outcome was decided not there but in the vast expanse that stretched west from the Appalachian Mountains to the Mississippi and beyond. Here, in the West, the truly decisive battles were fought.

— Steven E. Woodworth, Jefferson Davis and His Generals

The West was by some measures the most important theater of the war. Capture of the Mississippi River has been one of the key tenets of Union General-in-Chief Winfield Scott's Anaconda Plan. Military historian J. F. C. Fuller has described the Union invasion as an immense turning movement, a left wheel that started in Kentucky, headed south down the Mississippi River, and then east through Tennessee, Georgia, and the Carolinas. With the exception of the Battle of Chickamauga and some daring raids by cavalry or guerrilla forces, the four years in the West marked a string of almost continuous defeats for the Confederates; or, at best, tactical draws that eventually turned out to be strategic reversals. Union generals consistently outclassed most of their Confederate opponents, with the exception of cavalry commander Nathan Bedford Forrest. As the war progressed, many Union officers in the Western Theater began to view emancipation as a practical strategy to weaken the Confederacy by depriving it of its labor force and bolstering Union troop numbers with formerly enslaved individuals. This pragmatic approach to emancipation played a significant role in Union military policy in the region. Lacking the proximity to the opposing capitals and population centers (and the accompanying concentration of newspapers) of the East, the astounding Confederate victories, and the fame of Eastern generals such as Robert E. Lee, George B. McClellan, and Stonewall Jackson, the western theater received considerably less attention than the Eastern, both at the time and in subsequent historical accounts. The near-steady progress that Union forces made in defeating Confederate armies in the West and overtaking Confederate territory went nearly unnoticed. Beyond conventional Union and Confederate battles, the Western Theater was also shaped by conflicts with Native American nations, federal efforts to control slavery in Western territories, and struggles over political allegiance in border regions.

The campaign classification established by the United States National Park Service is more fine-grained than the one used in this article. Some minor NPS campaigns have been omitted and some have been combined into larger categories. Only a few of the 117 battles the NPS classifies for this theater are described. Boxed text in the right margin show the NPS campaigns associated with each section.

== Principal Union commanders of the western theater ==
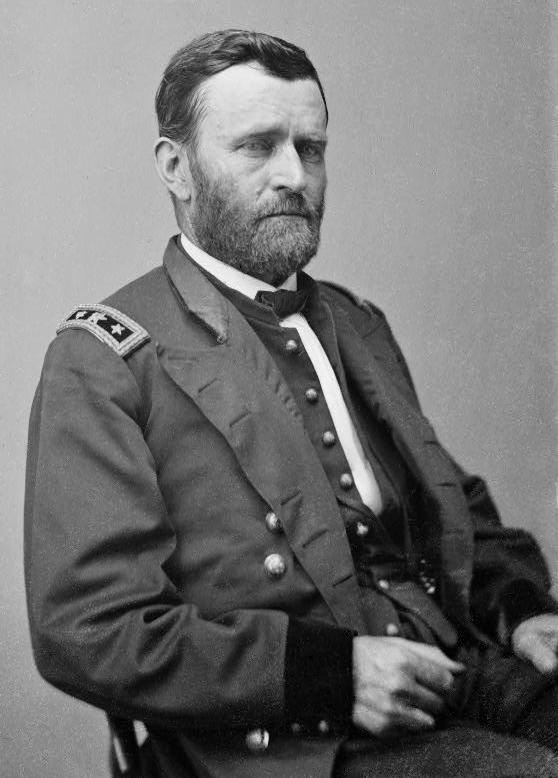
Lt. Gen.
Ulysses S. Grant,
USA

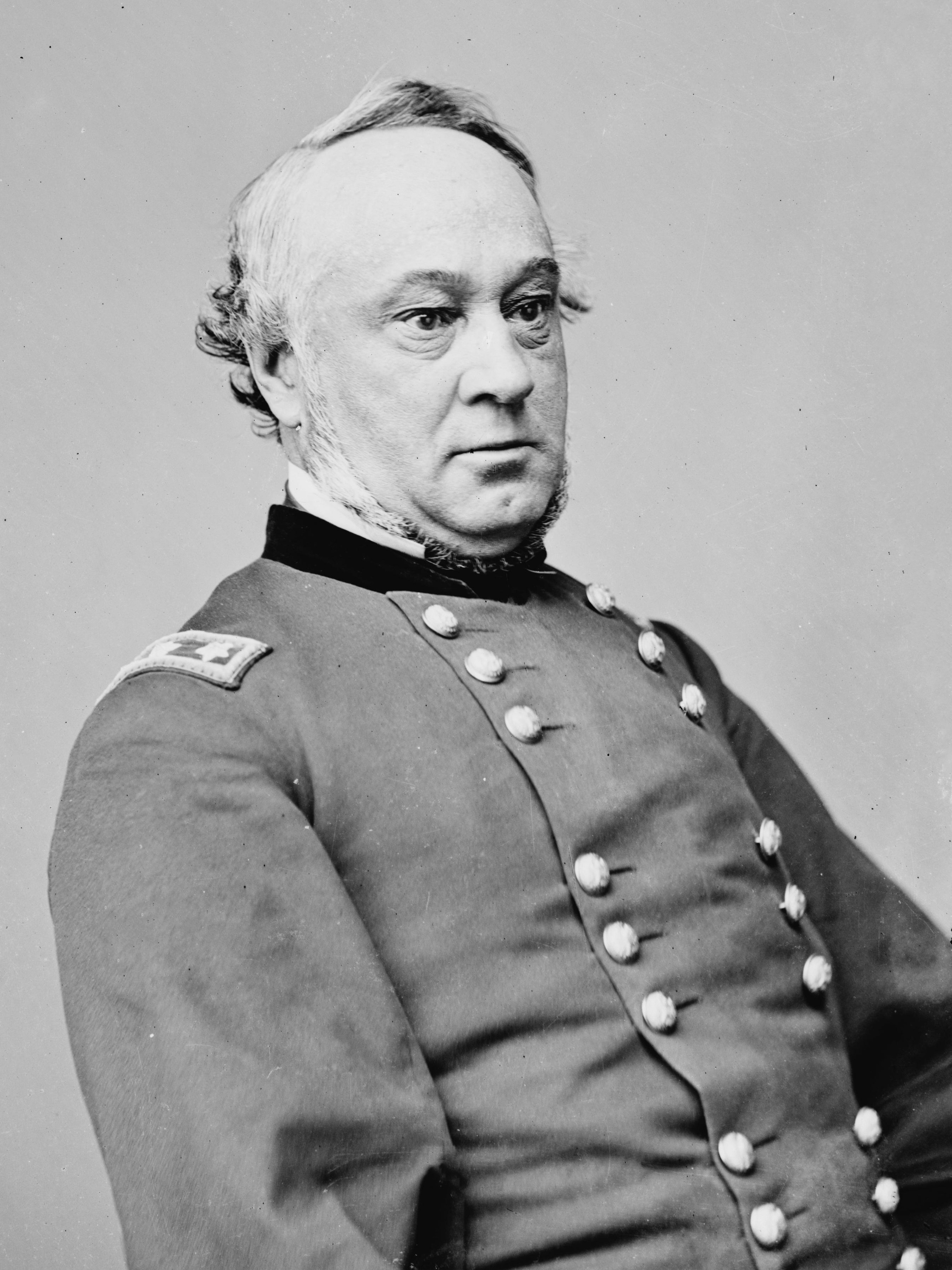
Maj. Gen.
Henry W. Halleck,
USA

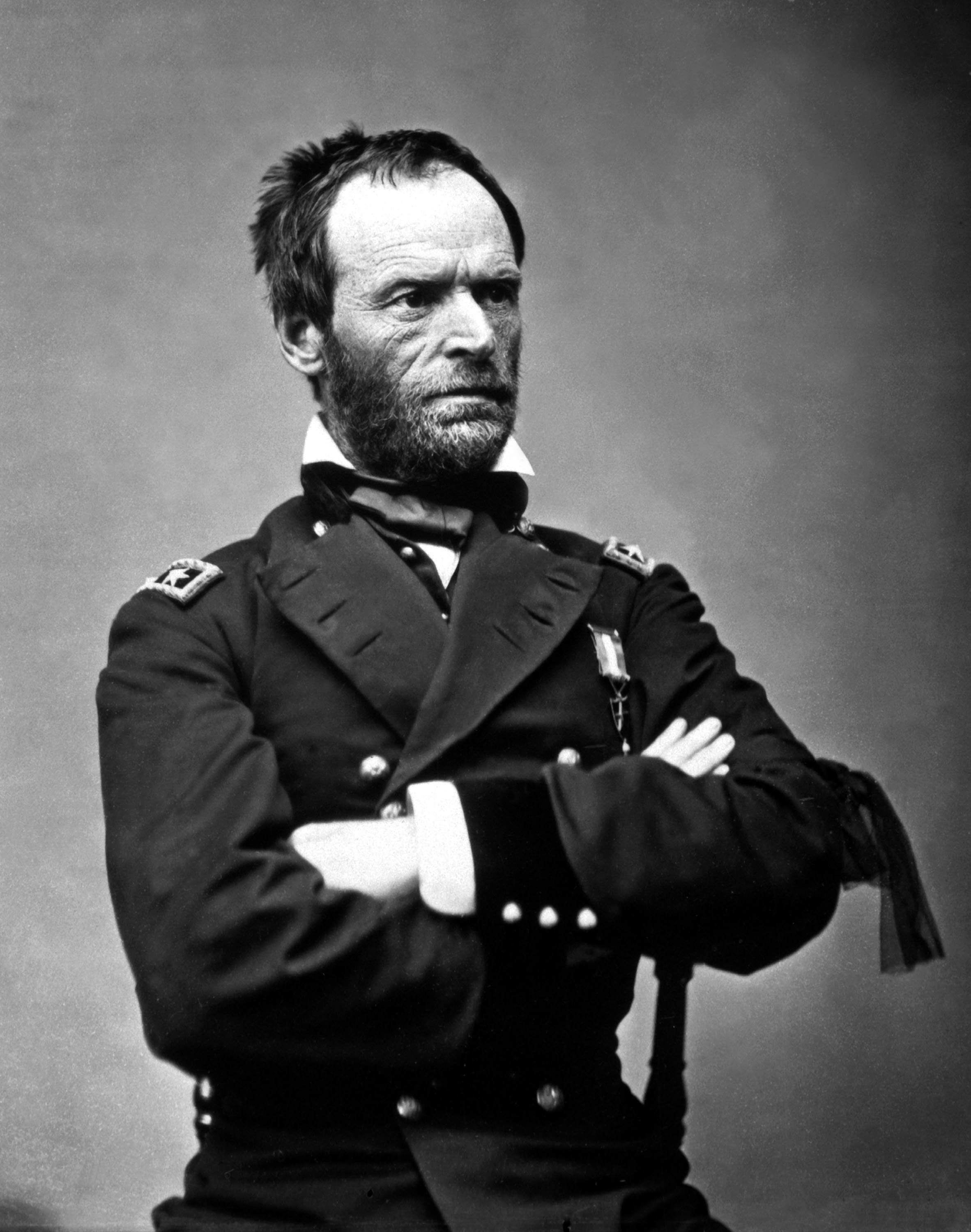
Maj. Gen.
William T. Sherman,
USA

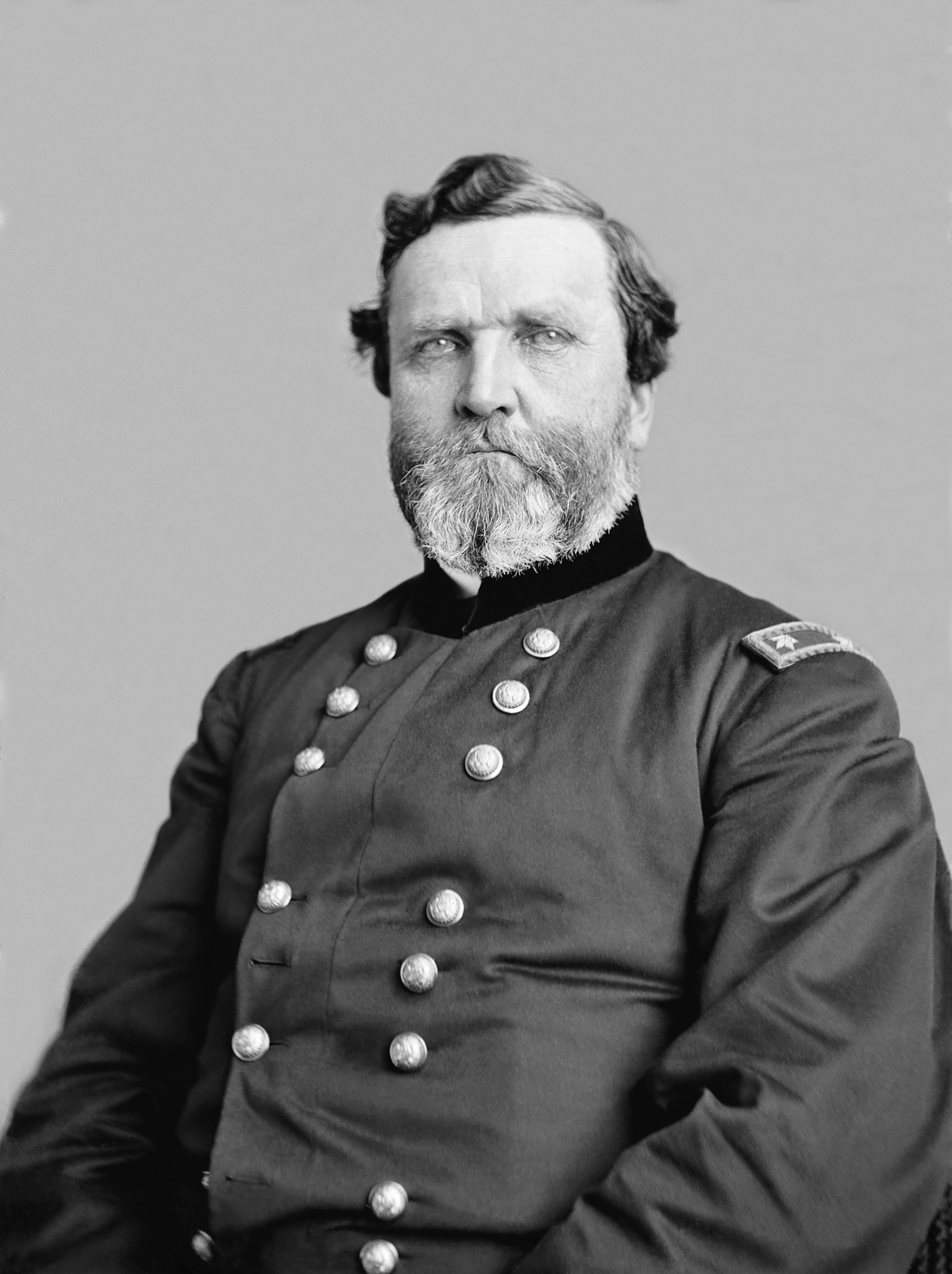
Maj. Gen.
George H. Thomas,
USA

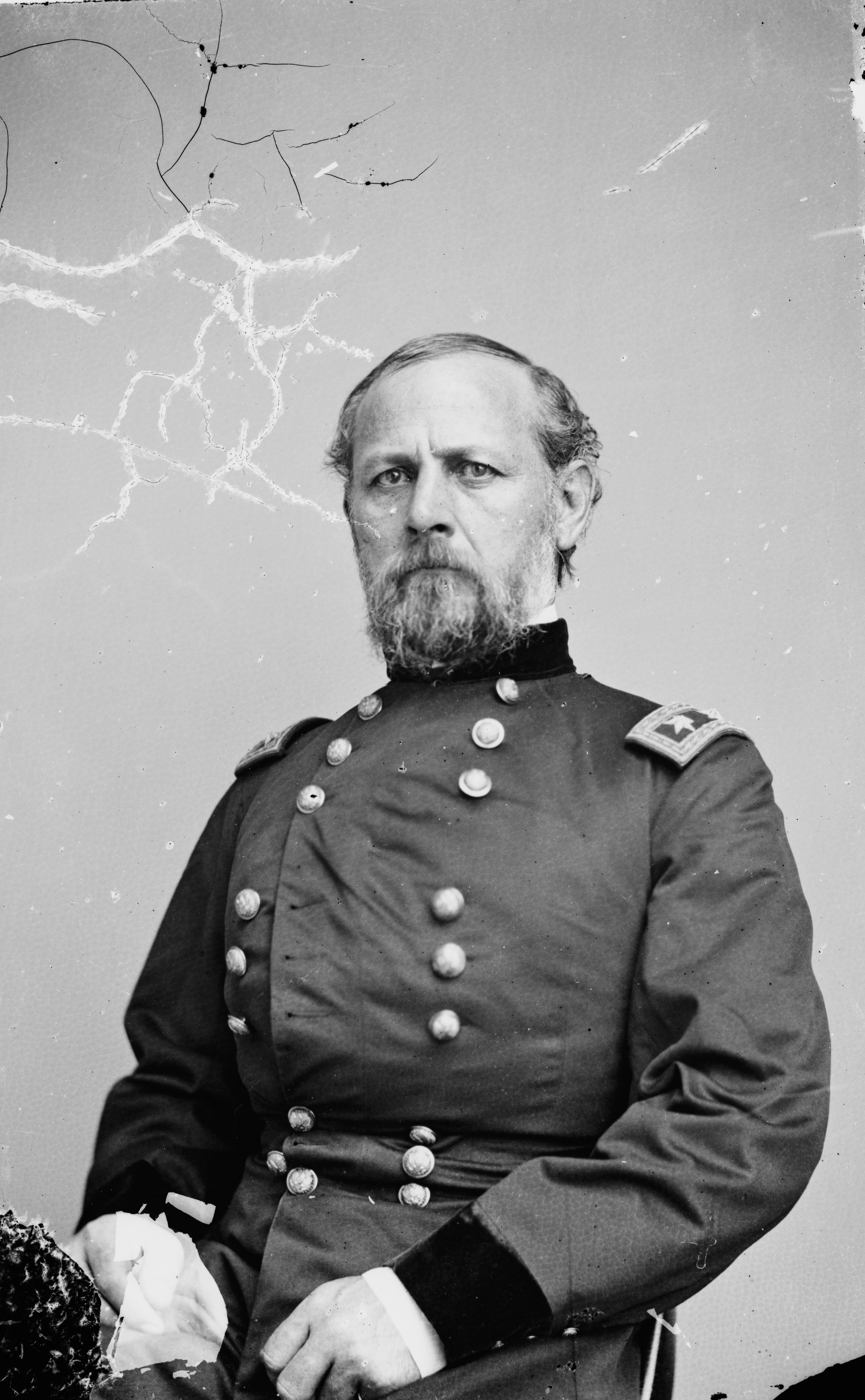
Maj. Gen.
Don Carlos Buell,
USA

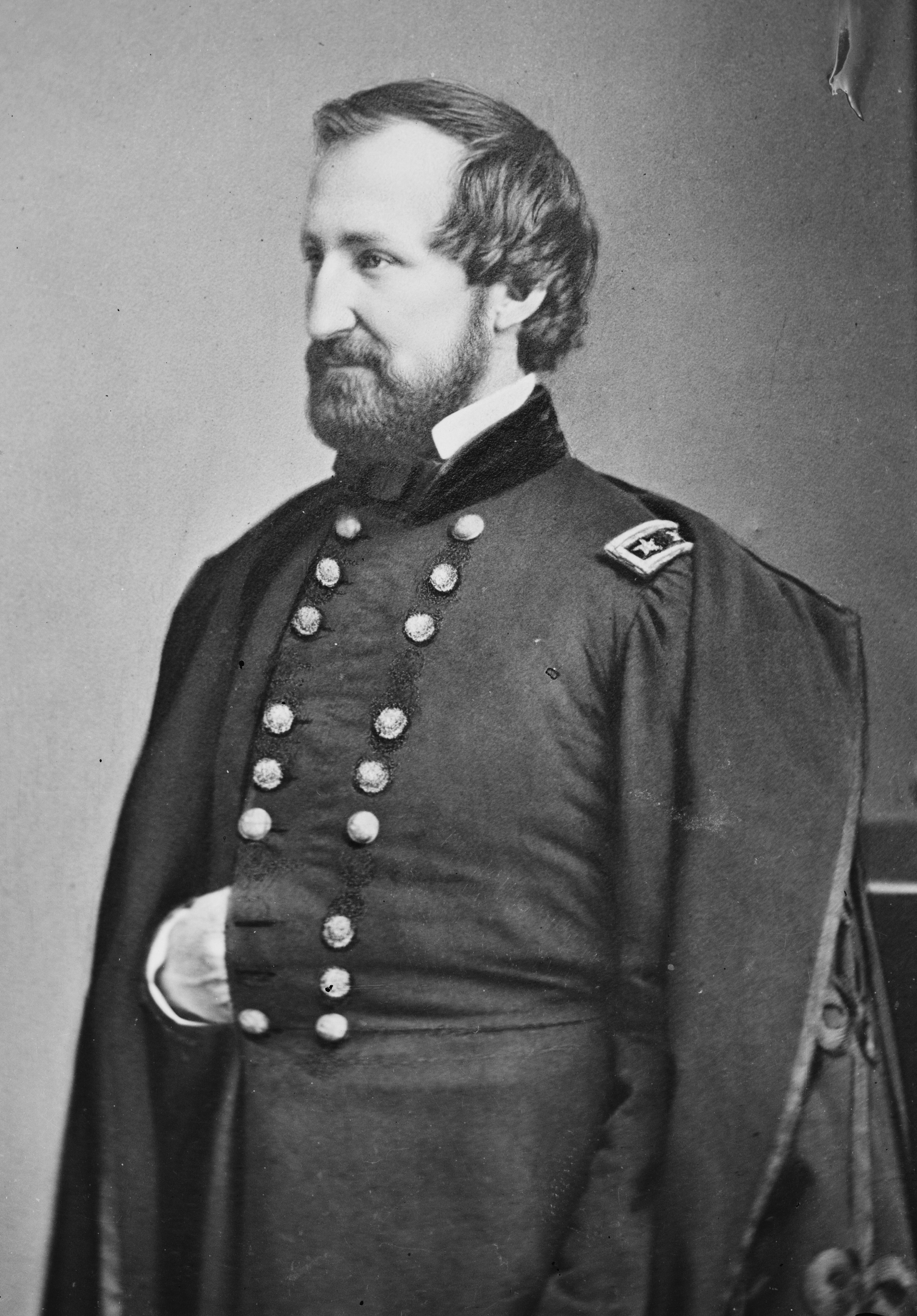
Maj. Gen.
William Rosecrans,
USA

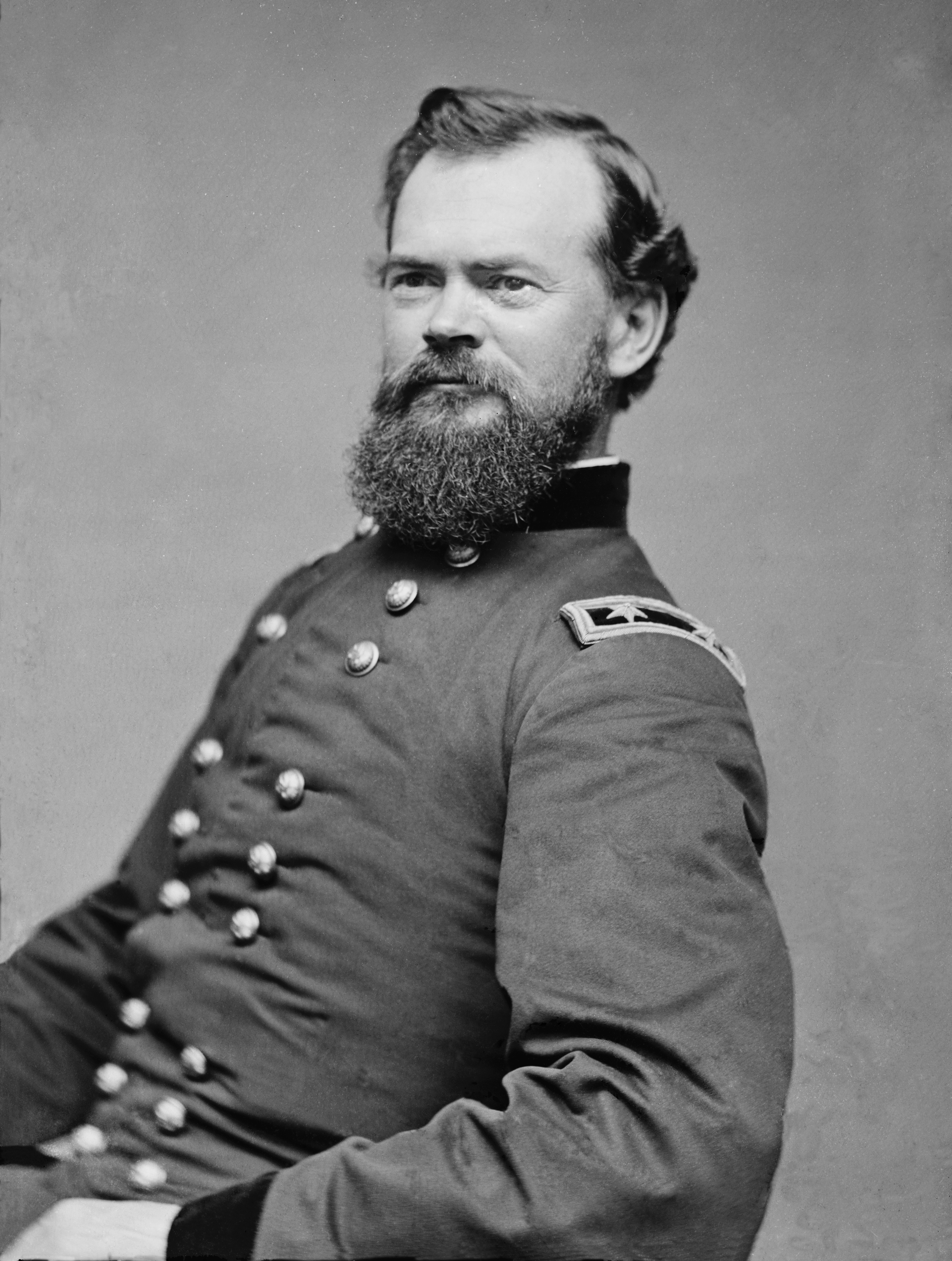
Maj. Gen.
James B. McPherson,
USA

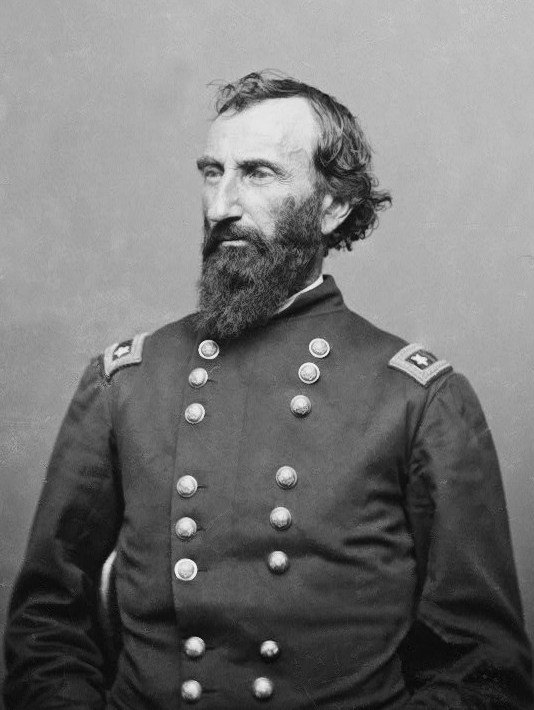
Maj. Gen.
John A. McClernand,
USA

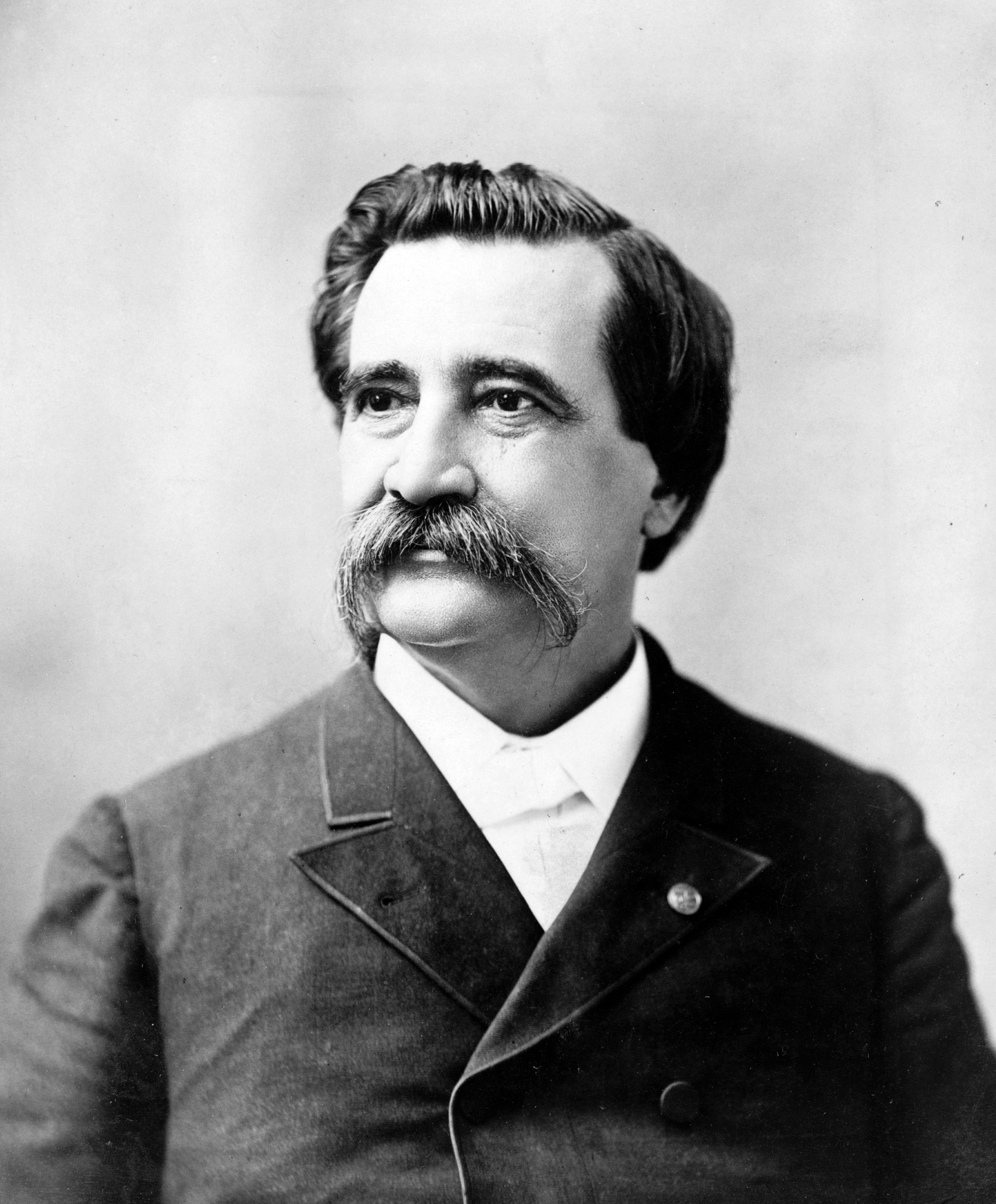
Maj. Gen.
John A. Logan,
USA

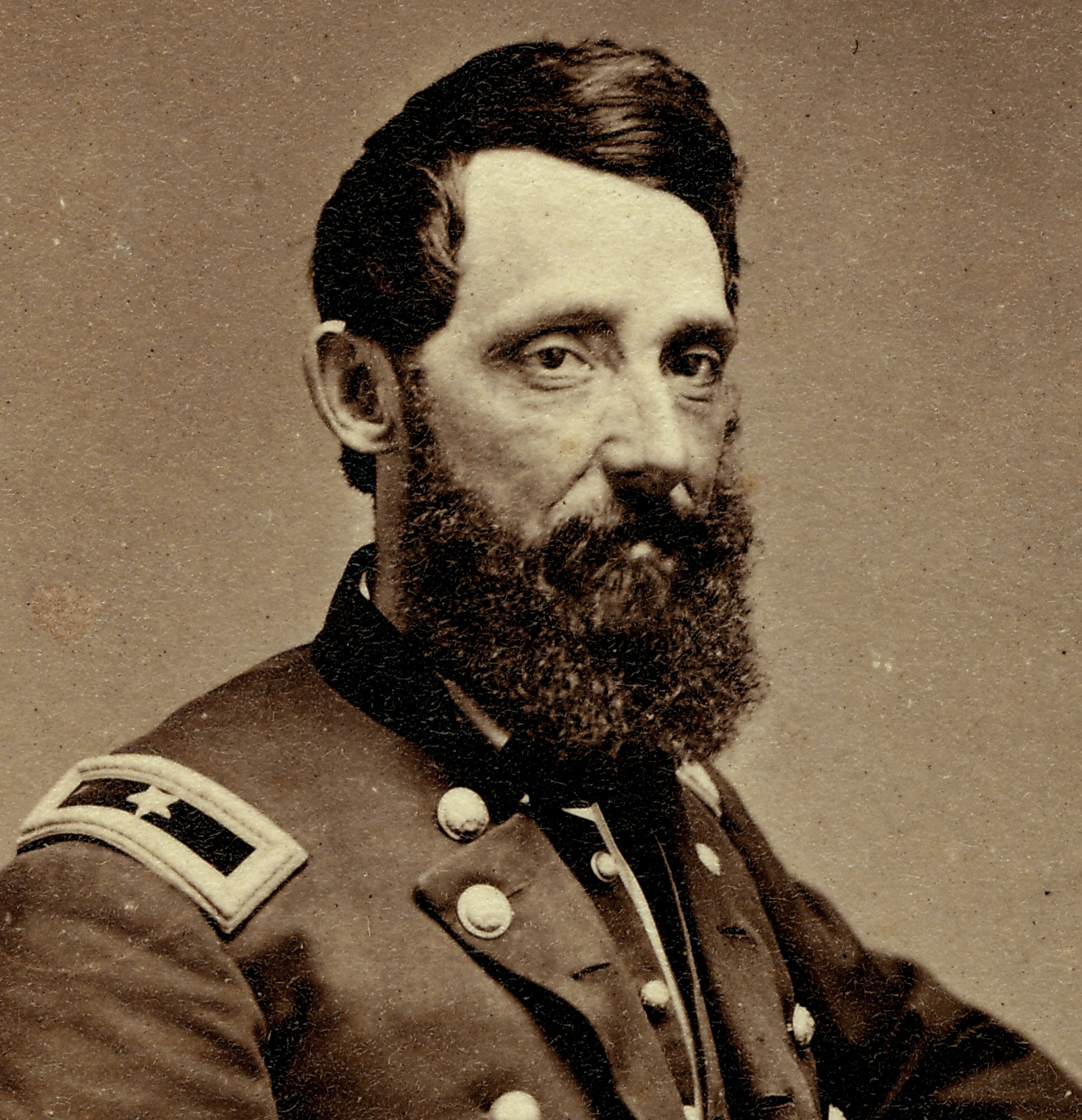
Brig. Gen.
Benjamin Grierson,
USA

== Principal Confederate commanders of the western theater ==
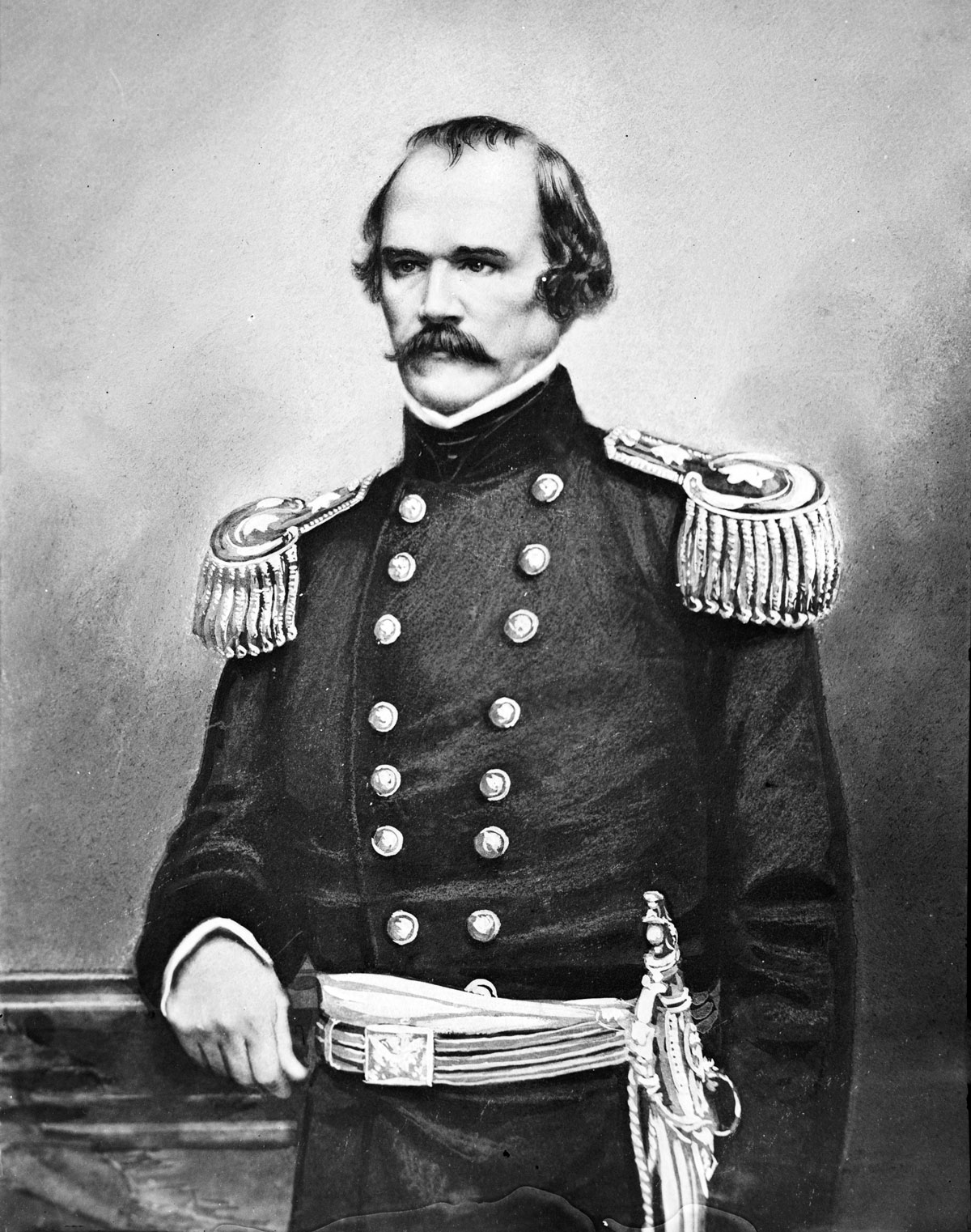
Gen.
Albert Sidney Johnston,
CSA

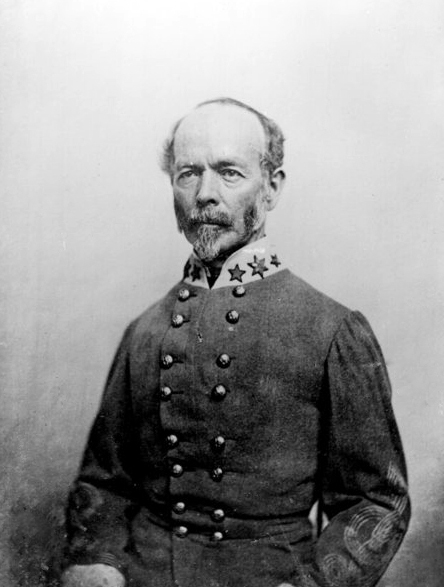
Gen.
Joseph E. Johnston,
CSA

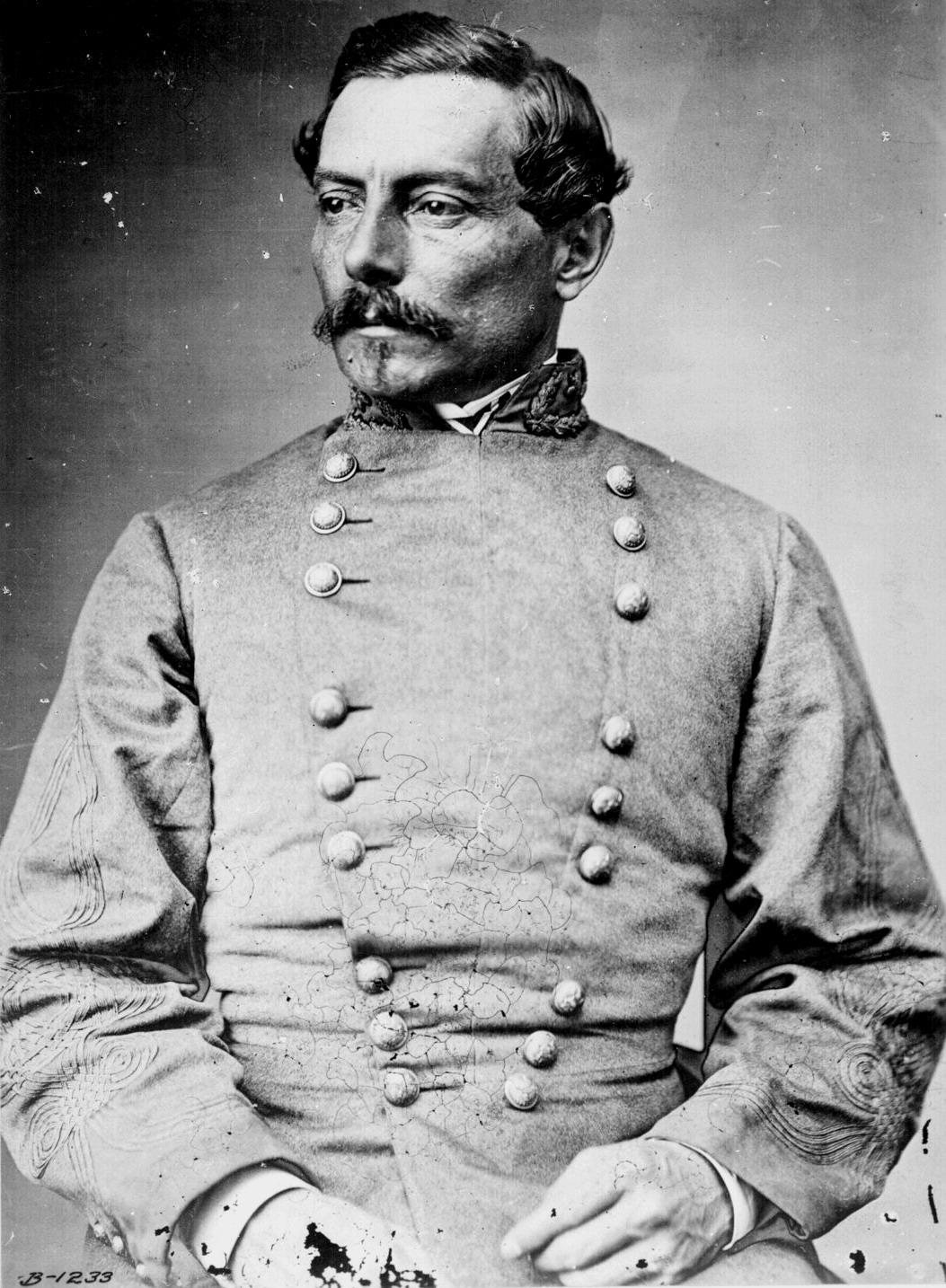
Gen.
P.G.T. Beauregard,
CSA

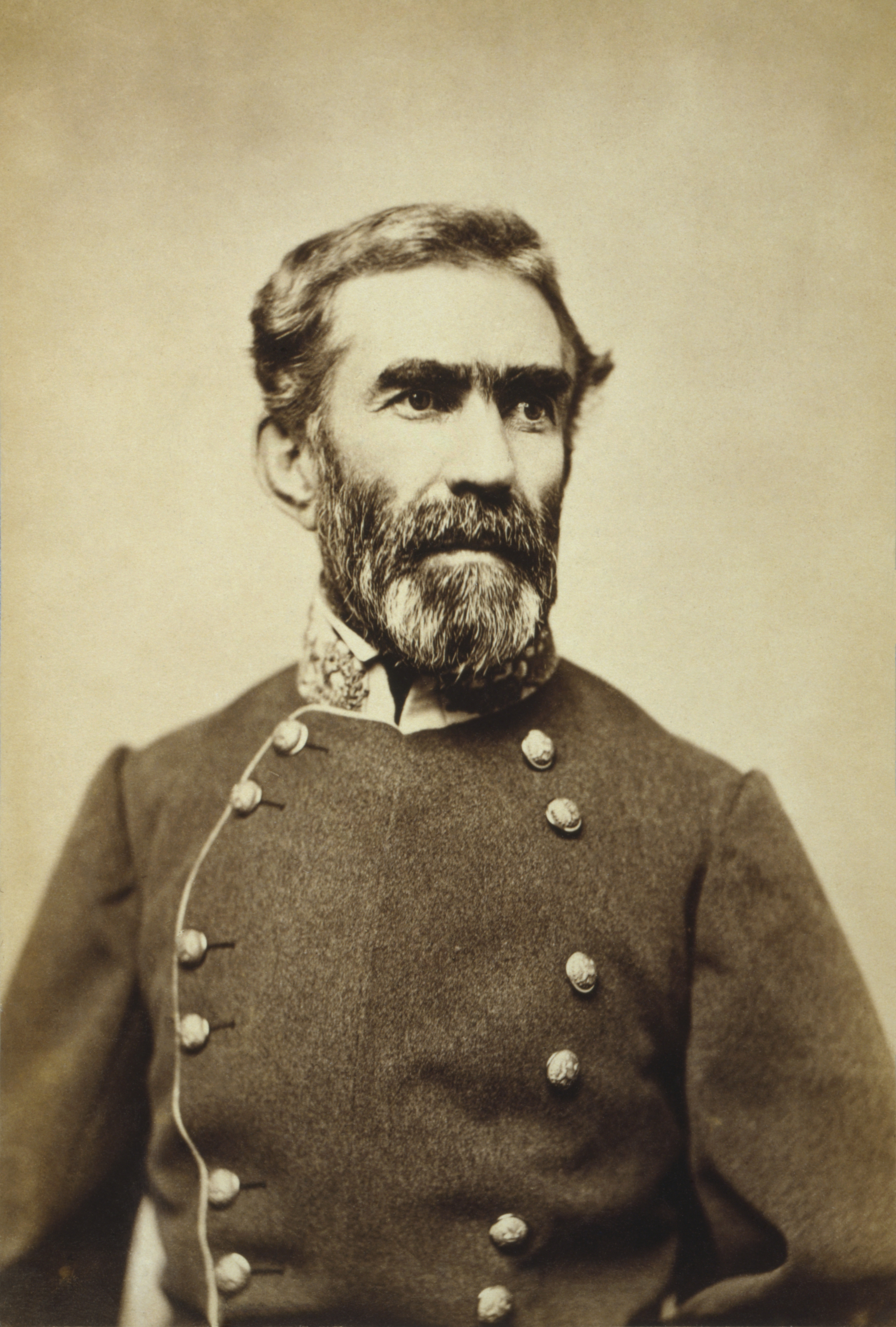
Gen.
Braxton Bragg,
CSA

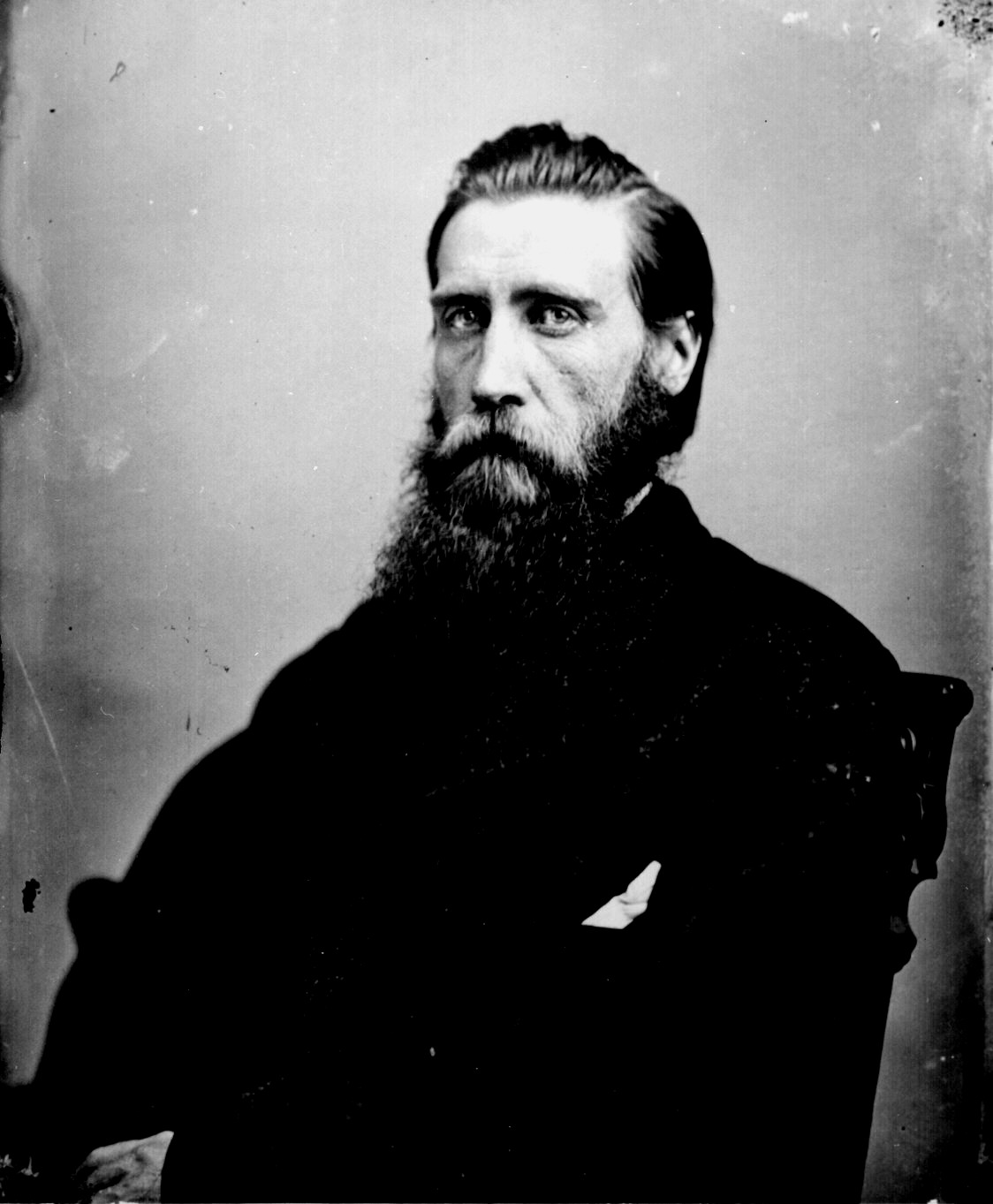
Lt. Gen.
John Bell Hood,
CSA

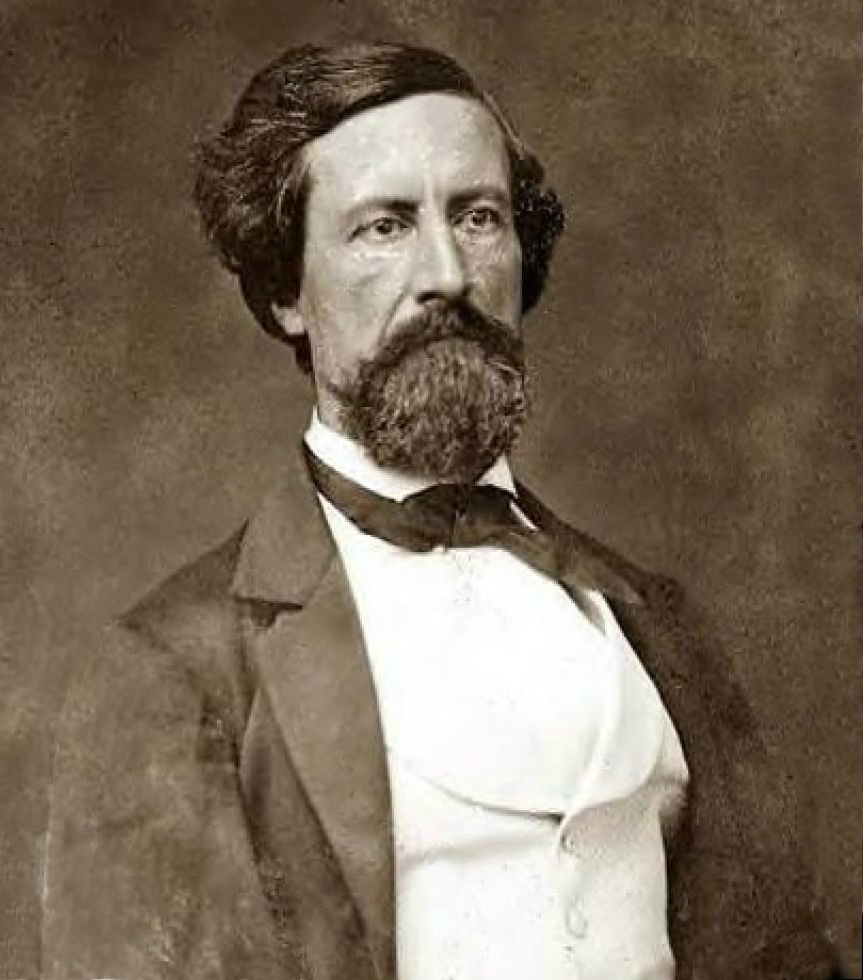
Lt. Gen.
John C. Pemberton
CSA

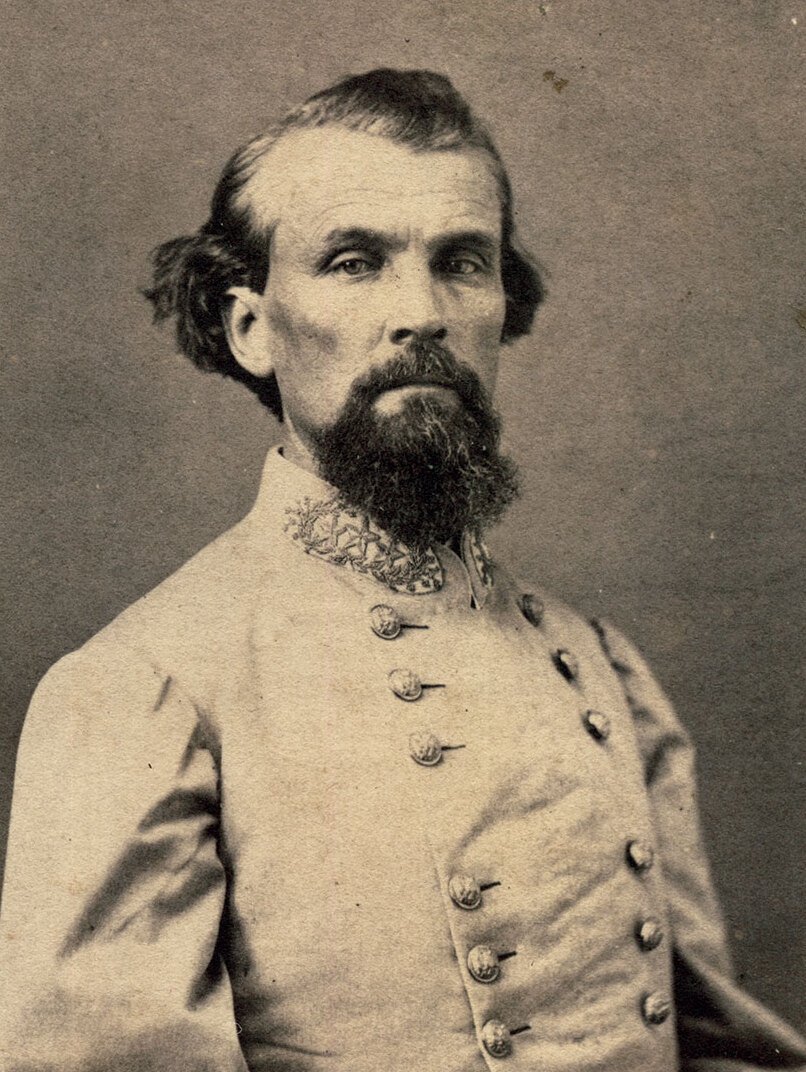
Lt. Gen.
Nathan Bedford Forrest
CSA

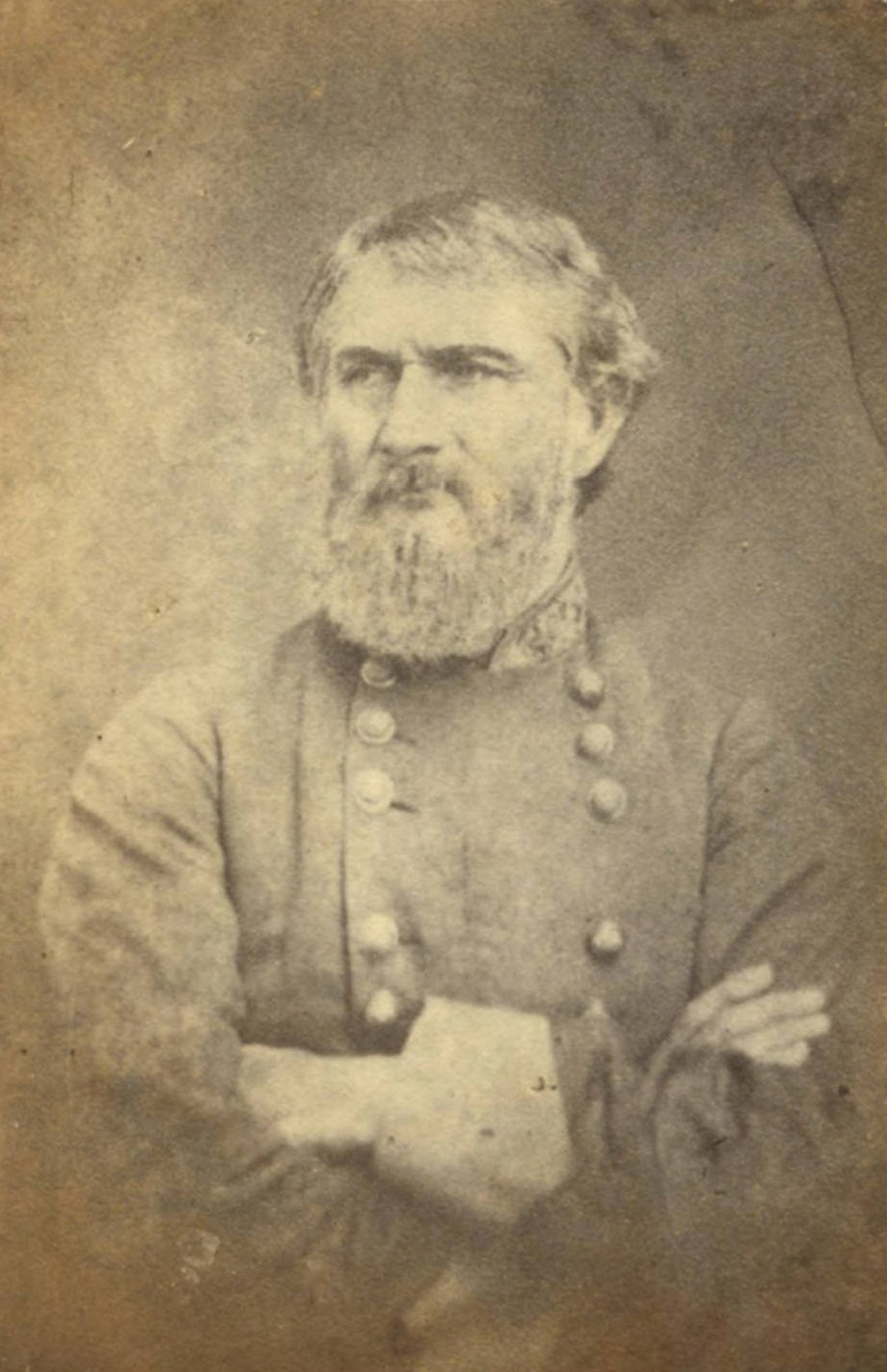
Lt. Gen.
Leonidas Polk,
CSA

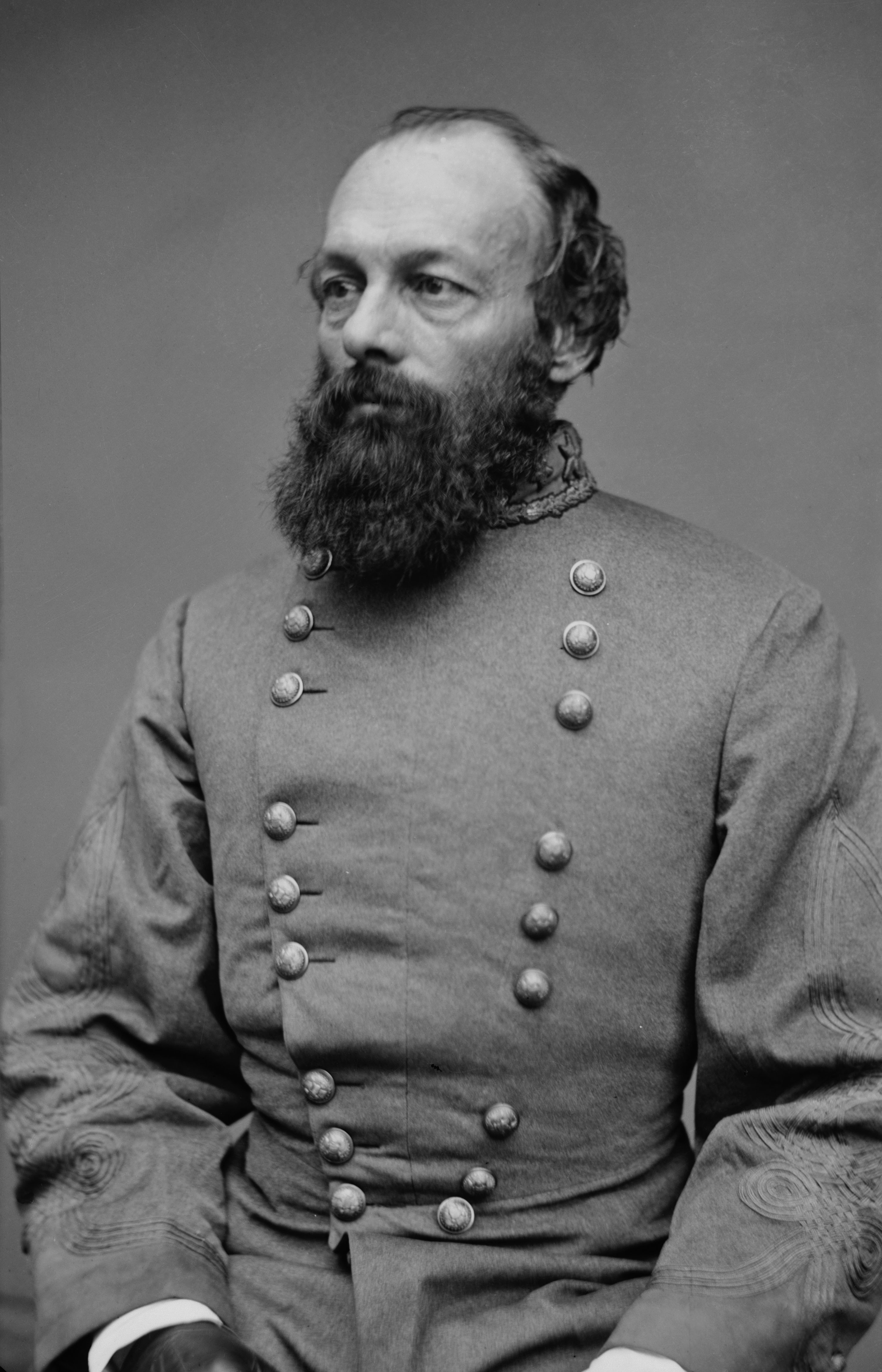
Maj. Gen.
Edmund Kirby Smith,
CSA

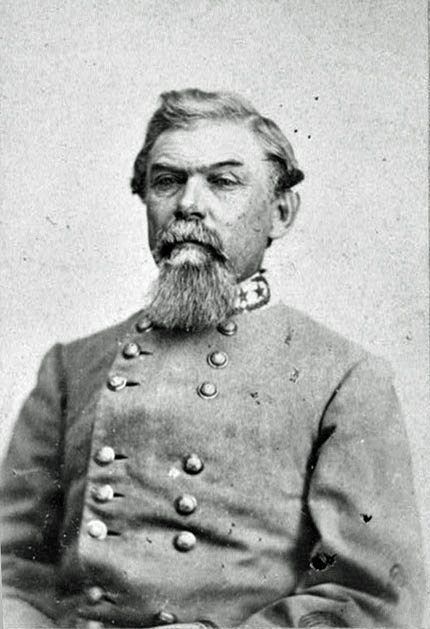
Maj. Gen.
William J. Hardee,
CSA

== Early operations (June 1861 – January 1862) ==
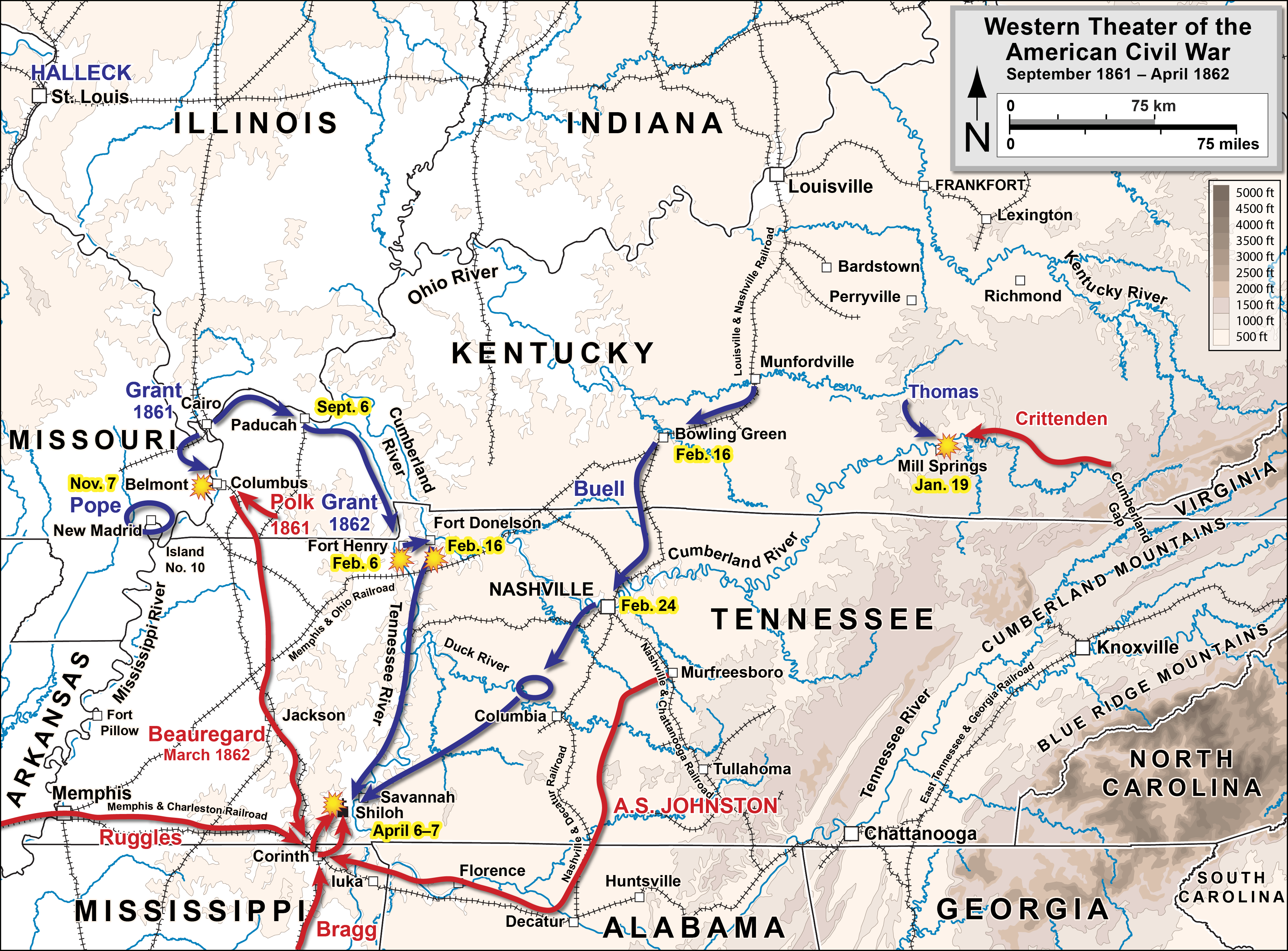
From Belmont (November 1861) to Shiloh (April 1862)

The focus early in the war was on two critical states: Missouri and Kentucky. The loss of either would have been a crippling blow to the Union cause. Primarily because of the successes of Captain Nathaniel Lyon and his victory at Boonville in June, Missouri was held in the Union. The state of Kentucky, with a pro-Confederate governor and a pro-Union legislature, had declared neutrality between the opposing sides. This neutrality was first violated on September 3, when Confederate Maj. Gen. Leonidas Polk occupied Columbus, considered key to controlling the Lower Mississippi. Two days later Union Brig. Gen. Ulysses S. Grant, displaying the personal initiative that would characterize his later career, seized Paducah. Henceforth, neither adversary respected the proclaimed neutrality of the state; while most of the state government remained loyal to the Union, the pro-Confederate elements of the legislature organized a separate government in Russellville that was admitted into the Confederate States. This sequence of events is considered a victory for the Union because Kentucky never formally sided with the Confederacy, and if the Union had been prevented from maneuvering within Kentucky, its later successful campaigns in Tennessee would have been more difficult.

On the Confederate side, General Albert Sidney Johnston commanded all forces from Arkansas to the Cumberland Gap. He was faced with the problem of defending a broad front with numerically inferior forces, but he had an excellent system of lateral communications, permitting him to move troops rapidly where they were needed, and he had two able subordinates, Polk and Maj. Gen. William J. Hardee. Johnston also gained political support from secessionists in central and western counties of Kentucky via a new Confederate capital at Bowling Green, set up by the Russellville Convention. The alternative government was recognized by the Confederate government, which admitted Kentucky into the Confederacy in December 1861. Using the rail system resources of the Mobile and Ohio Railroad, Polk was able to quickly fortify and equip the Confederate base at Columbus.

The Union military command in the West, however, suffered from a lack of unified command, organized by November into three separate departments: the Department of Kansas, under Maj. Gen. David Hunter, the Department of the Missouri, under Maj. Gen. Henry Halleck, and the Department of the Ohio, under Brig. Gen. Don Carlos Buell (who had replaced Brig. Gen. William Tecumseh Sherman). By January 1862, this disunity of command was apparent because no strategy for operations in the Western theater could be agreed upon. Buell, under political pressure to invade and hold pro-Union East Tennessee, moved slowly in the direction of Nashville, but achieved nothing more substantial toward his goal than minor victories at Middle Creek (January 10, 1862) under Col. James A. Garfield and Mill Springs (January 19) under Brig. Gen. George Henry Thomas. (Mill Springs was a significant victory in a strategic sense because it broke the end of the Confederate Western defensive line and opened the Cumberland Gap to East Tennessee, but it got Buell no closer to Nashville.) In Halleck's department, Grant demonstrated down the Mississippi River by attacking the Confederate camp at Belmont to divert attention from Buell's intended advance, which did not occur. On February 1, 1862, after repeated requests by Grant, Halleck authorized Grant to move against Fort Henry on the Tennessee.

== Tennessee, Cumberland, and Mississippi Rivers (February–June 1862) ==
Grant moved swiftly, starting his troops up the Tennessee River toward Fort Henry on river transports on February 2. His operations in the campaign were well coordinated with United States Navy Flag Officer Andrew H. Foote. The fort was poorly situated on a floodplain and virtually indefensible against gunboats, with many of its guns under water due to flooding winter rains. Because of the previous neutrality of Kentucky, the Confederates could not build river defenses at a more strategic location inside the state, so they settled for a site just inside the border of Tennessee. Brig. Gen. Lloyd Tilghman withdrew almost all of his garrison on February 5, moving them across country 11 miles (18 km) to the east to Fort Donelson. With a reduced crew manning the cannons, Tilghman fought an artillery duel with the Union squadron for nearly three hours before he determined that further resistance was useless. The Tennessee River was then open for future Union operations into the South.

Fort Donelson, on the Cumberland River, was more defensible than Henry, and Navy assaults on the fort were ineffective. Grant's army marched cross-country in pursuit of Tilghman's men and attempted immediate assaults on the fort from the rear, but they were unsuccessful. On February 15, the Confederate forces under Brig. Gen. John B. Floyd attempted to escape and launched a surprise assault against the Union right flank (commanded by Brig. Gen. John A. McClernand), driving McClernand's division back but not creating the opening they needed to slip away. Grant recovered from this temporary reversal and assaulted the weakened Confederate right. Trapped in the fort and the town of Dover, Tennessee, Confederate Brig. Gen. Simon B. Buckner surrendered his command of 11,500 men and many needed guns and supplies to Grant's demand for "unconditional surrender". The combined victories at Henry and Donelson were the first significant Union victories in the war, and two major rivers became available for invasions into Tennessee.

Johnston's forward defense was broken. As Grant had anticipated, Polk's position at Columbus was untenable, and he withdrew soon after Donelson fell. Grant had also cut the Memphis and Ohio Railroad that previously had allowed Confederate forces to move laterally in support of each other. General P.G.T. Beauregard had arrived from the East to report to Johnston in February, and he commanded all Confederate forces between the Mississippi and Tennessee Rivers, which effectively divided the unity of command so that Johnston controlled only a small force at Murfreesboro, Tennessee. Beauregard planned to concentrate his forces in the vicinity of Corinth, Mississippi, and prepare for an offensive. Johnston moved his force to concentrate with Beauregard's by late March.

The preparations for the Union campaign did not proceed smoothly. Halleck seemed more concerned with his standing in relation to General-in-Chief George B. McClellan than he did with understanding that the Confederate Army was divided and could be defeated in detail. Further, he could not agree with his peer, Buell, now in Nashville, on a joint course of action. He sent Grant up the Tennessee River while Buell remained in Nashville. On March 11, President Lincoln appointed Halleck the commander of all forces from the Missouri River to Knoxville, Tennessee, thus achieving the needed unity of command, and Halleck ordered Buell to join Grant's forces at Pittsburg Landing on the Tennessee River.

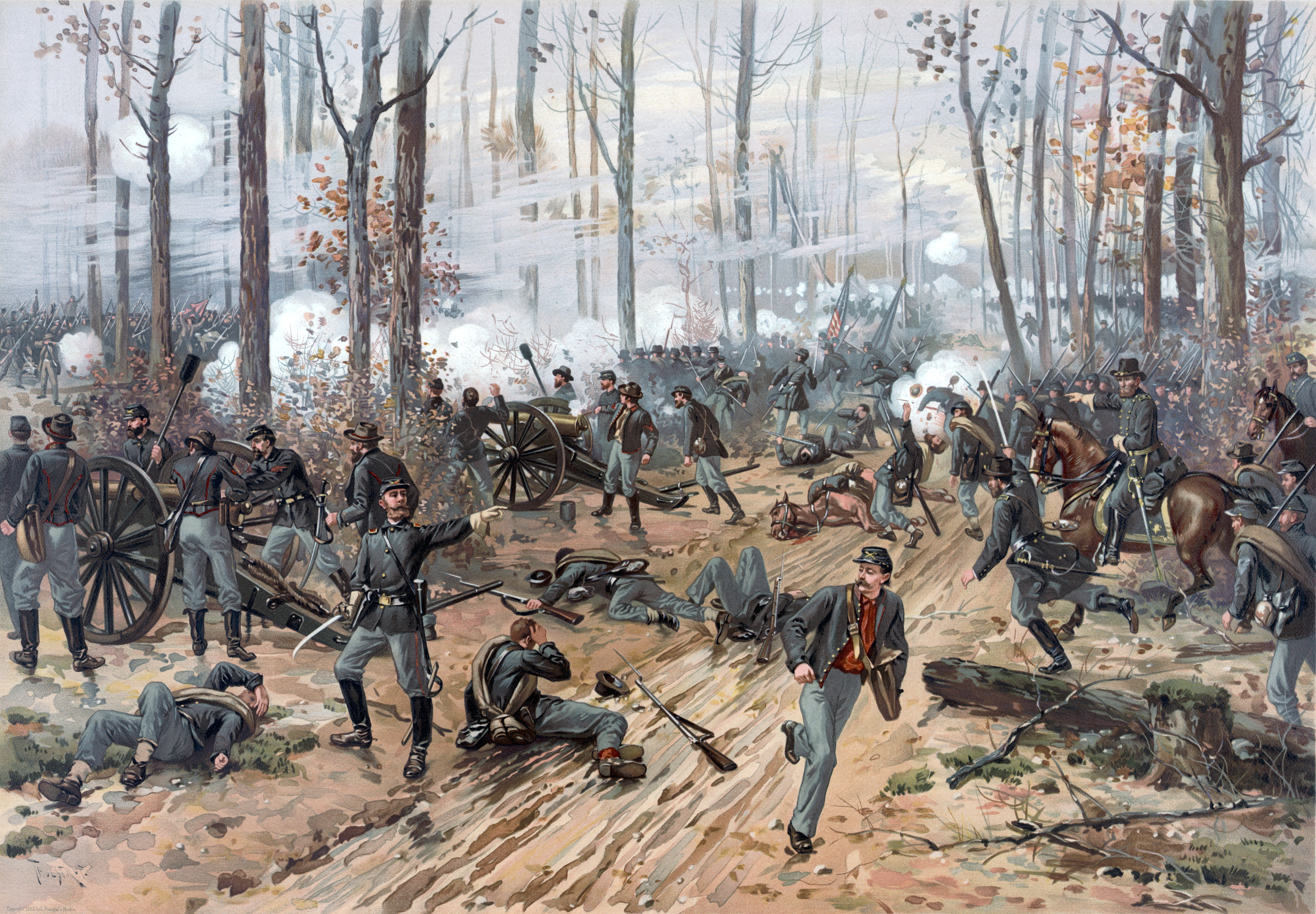
The Battle of Shiloh was fought on April 6–7, 1862, in southwestern Tennessee

On April 6, the combined Confederate forces under Beauregard and Johnston surprised Grant's unprepared Army of West Tennessee with a massive dawn assault at Pittsburg Landing in the Battle of Shiloh. In the first day of the battle, the Confederate onslaught drove Grant back against the Tennessee but could not defeat him. Johnston was mortally wounded leading an infantry charge that day; he was considered by Jefferson Davis to be the most effective general in the Confederacy at that time. On the second day, April 7, Grant received reinforcements from Buell and launched a counterattack that drove back the Confederates. Grant failed to pursue the retreating enemy and received enormous criticism for this and for the great loss of life—more casualties (almost 24,000) than all previous American battles combined.

Union control of the Mississippi River began to tighten. On April 7, while the Confederates were retreating from Shiloh, Union Maj. Gen. John Pope defeated Beauregard's isolated force at Island Number 10, opening the river almost as far south as Memphis. On April 28, Admiral David Farragut captured New Orleans, the South's largest city and most significant seaport. Army Maj. Gen. Benjamin Butler occupied the city with a strong military government that caused considerable resentment among the civilian population.

Although Beauregard had little concentrated strength available to oppose a southward movement by Halleck, the Union general showed insufficient drive to take advantage of the situation. He waited until he assembled a large army, combining the forces of Buell's Army of the Ohio, Grant's Army of West Tennessee, and Pope's Army of the Mississippi, to converge at Pittsburg Landing. He moved slowly in the direction of the critical rail junction at Corinth, taking four weeks to cover the twenty miles (32 km) from Shiloh, stopping nightly to entrench. By May 3, Halleck was within ten miles of the city but took another three weeks to advance eight miles closer to Corinth, by which time Halleck was ready to start a massive bombardment of the Confederate defenses. At this time, Beauregard decided not to make a costly defensive stand and withdrew without hostilities during the night of May 29.

Grant did not command directly in the Corinth campaign. Halleck had reorganized his army, giving Grant the powerless position of second-in-command and shuffling divisions from the three armies into three "wings". When Halleck moved east to replace McClellan as general-in-chief, Grant resumed his field command, now named the District of West Tennessee. But before he left, Halleck dispersed his forces, sending Buell towards Chattanooga, Sherman to Memphis, one division to Arkansas, and Rosecrans to hold a covering position around Corinth. Part of Halleck's reason for this was that Lincoln desired to capture eastern Tennessee and protect the Unionists in the region.

== Kentucky, Tennessee, and northern Mississippi (June 1862 – January 1863) ==
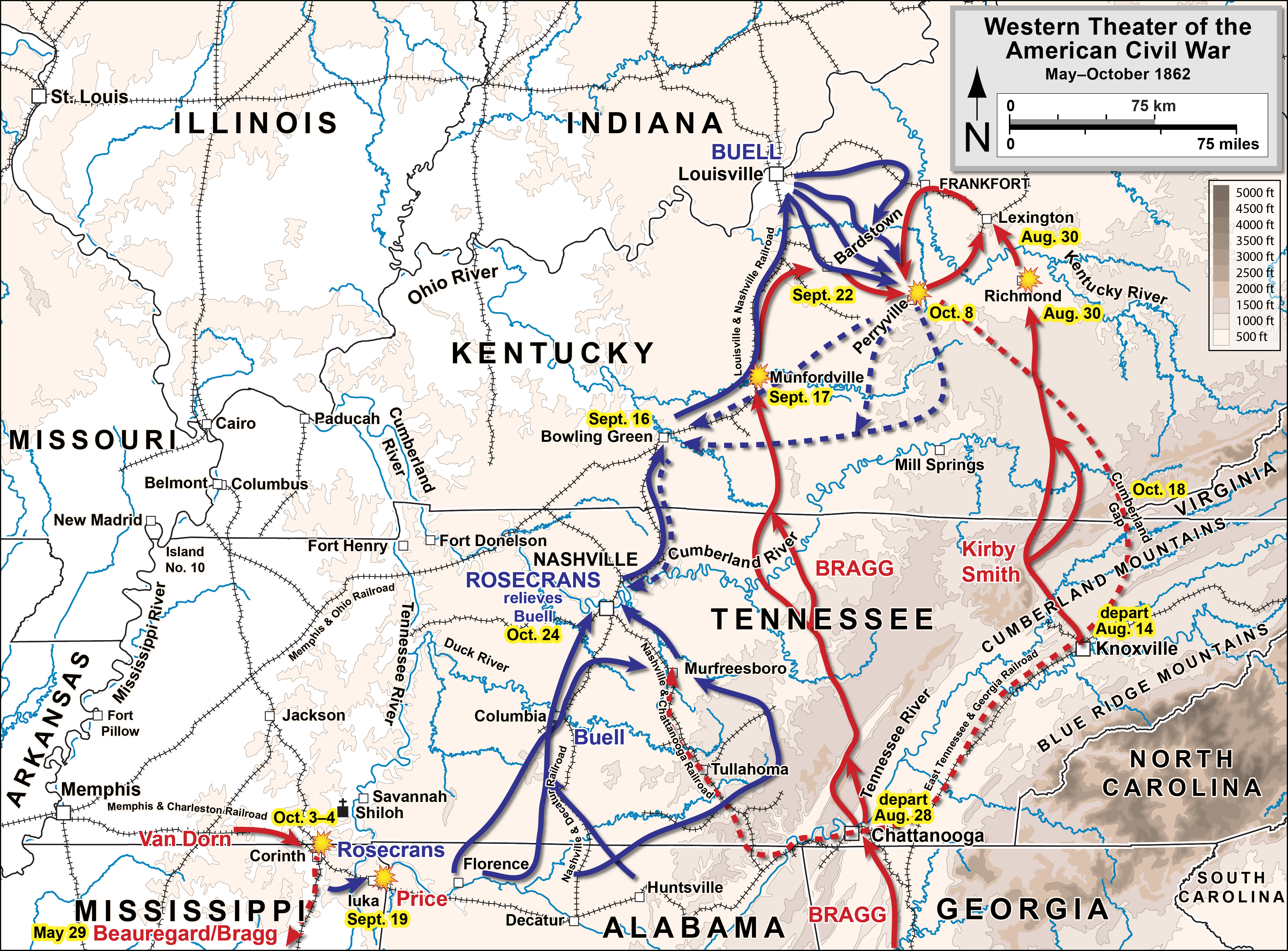
From Corinth (May 1862) to Perryville (October 1862)

While Halleck accomplished little following Corinth, Confederate Gen. Braxton Bragg succeeded Beauregard (on June 27, for health reasons) in command of his 56,000 troops of the Army of Tennessee, in Tupelo, Mississippi, due south of Corinth. But he determined that an advance directly north from Tupelo was not practical. He left Maj. Gens. Sterling Price and Earl Van Dorn to distract Grant and shifted 35,000 men by rail through Mobile, Alabama, to Chattanooga. Even though he did not leave Tupelo until July 21, he was able to reach Chattanooga before Buell could. Bragg's general plan was to invade Kentucky in a joint operation with Maj. Gen. Edmund Kirby Smith, cut Buell's lines of communications, defeat him, and then turn back to defeat Grant.

Kirby Smith left Knoxville on August 14, forced the Union to evacuate Cumberland Gap, defeated a Union force at the Battle of Richmond (Kentucky) taking over 4,000 prisoners, and reached Lexington on August 30. Bragg departed Chattanooga just before Smith reached Lexington, while Buell moved north from Nashville to Bowling Green. But Bragg moved quickly and by September 14 had interposed his army on Buell's supply lines from Louisville. Bragg was reluctant to develop this situation because he was outnumbered by Buell; if he had been able to combine with Kirby Smith, he would have been numerically equal, but Smith's command was separate, and Smith believed that Bragg could capture Louisville without his assistance.

Buell, under pressure from the government to take aggressive action, was almost relieved of duty (only the personal reluctance of George H. Thomas to assume command from his superior at the start of a campaign prevented it). As he approached Perryville, Kentucky, he began to concentrate his army in the face of Confederate forces there. Bragg was not initially present with his army, having decided to attend the inauguration ceremony of a Confederate governor of Kentucky in Frankfort. On October 8, fighting began at Perryville over possession of water sources, and as the fighting escalated, Bragg's Army of Mississippi achieved some tactical success in an assault against a single corps of Buell's Army of the Ohio. That evening Bragg realized that he was facing Buell's entire army and ordered a retreat to Harrodsburg, where he was joined by Kirby Smith's Army of Kentucky on October 10. Despite having a strong combined force, Bragg made no attempt to regain the initiative. Buell was equally passive. Bragg retreated through the Cumberland Gap and returned to Murfreesboro by way of Chattanooga.

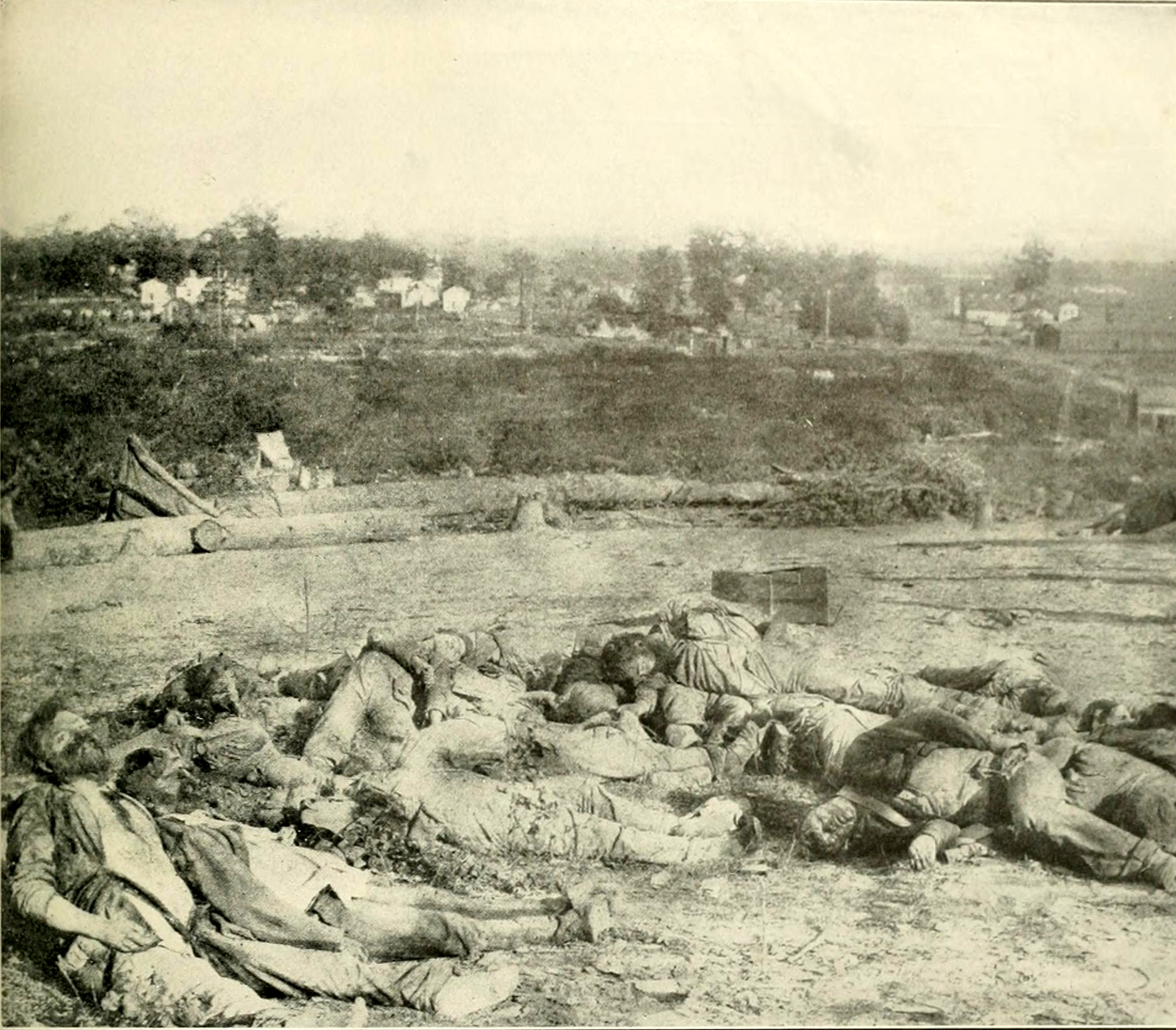
Confederate soldiers killed during the Second Battle of Corinth, October 1862

While Buell was facing Bragg's threat in Kentucky, Confederate operations in northern Mississippi were aimed at preventing Buell's reinforcement by Grant, who was preparing for his upcoming Vicksburg campaign. Halleck had departed for Washington, and Grant was left without interference as commander of the District of West Tennessee. On September 14, Maj. Gen. Sterling Price moved his Confederate Army of the West to Iuka, 20 miles (32 km) east of Corinth. He intended to link up with Maj. Gen. Earl Van Dorn's Army of West Tennessee and operate against Grant. But Grant sent forces under Maj. Gens. William S. Rosecrans and Edward Ord to attack Price's force at Iuka. Rosecrans won a minor victory at the Battle of Iuka (September 19), but poor coordination of forces and an acoustic shadow allowed Price to escape from the intended Union double envelopment.

Price and Van Dorn decided to unite their forces and attack the concentration of Union troops at Corinth and then advance into West or Middle Tennessee. In the Second Battle of Corinth (October 3–4), they attacked the fortified Union troops but were repulsed with serious losses. Retreating to the northwest, they escaped pursuit by Rosecrans's exhausted army, but their objectives of threatening Middle Tennessee and supporting Bragg were foiled.

On October 24, the Union government replaced Buell with Rosecrans, who renamed his force the Army of the Cumberland. After a period of resupplying and training his army in Nashville, Rosecrans moved against Bragg at Murfreesboro just after Christmas. In the Battle of Stones River, Bragg surprised Rosecrans with a powerful assault on December 31, pushing the Union forces back to a small perimeter against the Stones River. But on January 2, 1863, further attempts to assault Rosecrans were beaten back decisively and Bragg withdrew his army southeast to Tullahoma. In proportion to the size of the armies, the casualties at Stones River (about 12,000 on each side) made it the bloodiest battle of the war. At the end of the campaign, Bragg's threat against Kentucky had been defeated, and he effectively yielded control of Middle Tennessee.

== Stones River Campaign ==
The Stones River Campaign of the American Civil War lasted from November 1862 to January 1863. The campaign was tactically a draw but was a strategic Union victory due to the Confederate retreat after the Battle of Stones River.

== Vicksburg Campaigns (December 1862 – July 1863) ==
Operations against Vicksburg and Grant's Bayou Operations

Abraham Lincoln believed that the river fortress city of Vicksburg, Mississippi, was a key to winning the war. Vicksburg and Port Hudson were the last remaining strongholds that prevented full Union control of the Mississippi River. Situated on high bluffs overlooking a sharp bend in the river and called the "Gibraltar of the Mississippi", Vicksburg was nearly invulnerable to naval assault. Admiral David Farragut had found this directly in his failed operations of May 1862.

The overall plan to capture Vicksburg was for Ulysses S. Grant to move south from Memphis and Maj. Gen. Nathaniel P. Banks to move north from Baton Rouge. Banks's advance was slow to develop and bogged down at Port Hudson, offering little assistance to Grant.

=== First campaign ===
Grant's first campaign was a two-pronged movement. William T. Sherman sailed down the Mississippi River with 32,000 men while Grant was to move in parallel through Mississippi by railroad with 40,000. Grant advanced 80 miles (130 km), but his supply lines were cut by Confederate cavalry under Earl Van Dorn at Holly Springs, forcing him to fall back. Sherman reached the Yazoo River just north of the city of Vicksburg, but without support from Grant's half of the mission, he was repulsed in bloody assaults against Chickasaw Bayou in late December.

Political considerations then intruded. Illinois politician and Maj. Gen. John A. McClernand obtained permission from Lincoln to recruit an army in southern Illinois and command it on a river-born expedition aimed at Vicksburg. He was able to get Sherman's corps assigned to him, but it departed Memphis before McClernand could arrive. When Sherman returned from the Yazoo, McClernand asserted control. He inexplicably detoured from his primary objective by capturing Arkansas Post on the Arkansas River, but before he could resume his main advance, Grant had reasserted control, and McClernand became a corps commander in Grant's army. For the rest of the winter, Grant attempted five separate projects to reach the city by moving through or reengineering, rivers, canals, and bayous to the north of Vicksburg. All five were unsuccessful; Grant explained afterward that he had expected these setbacks and was simply attempting to keep his army busy and motivated, but many historians believe he really hoped that some would succeed and that they were too ambitious.

=== Second campaign ===
Grant's operations against Vicksburg

Grierson's Raid

The second campaign, beginning in the spring of 1863, was successful and is considered Grant's greatest achievement of the war (and a classic campaign of military history). He knew that he could not attack through Mississippi from the northwest because of the vulnerability of his supply line; river-born approaches had failed repeatedly. So, after movement became possible on dirt roads that were finally drying from the winter rains, Grant moved the bulk of his army down the western bank of the Mississippi. On April 16, U.S. Navy gunboats and troop transports managed at great risk to slip past the Vicksburg defensive guns and were able to ferry Grant's army across the river to land south of Vicksburg at Bruinsburg. Grant employed two strategic diversions to mask his intentions: a feint by Sherman north of Vicksburg and a daring cavalry raid through central Mississippi by Colonel Benjamin Grierson, known as Grierson's Raid. The former was inconclusive, but the latter was a success. Grierson was able to draw out significant Confederate forces, dispersing them around the state.

Grant faced two Confederate armies in his campaign: the Vicksburg garrison, commanded by Maj. Gen. John C. Pemberton, and forces in Jackson, commanded by Gen. Joseph E. Johnston, the overall theater commander. Rather than simply heading directly north to the city, Grant chose to cut the line of communications (and reinforcement) between the two Confederate armies. His army headed swiftly northeast toward Jackson. Meanwhile, Grant brought with him a limited supply line. The conventional history of the campaign indicates that he cut loose from all of his supplies, perplexing Pemberton, who attempted to interdict his nonexistent lines at Raymond on May 12. In reality, Grant relied on the local economy to provide him only foodstuffs for men and animals, but there was a constant stream of wagons carrying ammunition, coffee, hardtack, salt, and other supplies for his army.

Sherman's corps captured Jackson on May 14. The entire army then turned west to confront Pemberton in front of Vicksburg. The decisive battle was at Champion Hill, the effective last stand for Pemberton before he withdrew into his entrenchments around the city. Grant's army assaulted the Confederate works twice at great cost at the start of the Siege of Vicksburg but then settled in for a lengthy siege.

The soldiers and civilians in Vicksburg suffered greatly from Union bombardment and impending starvation. They clung to the hope that General Johnston would arrive with reinforcements, but Johnston was both cut off and too cautious. On July 4, Pemberton surrendered his army and the city to Grant. In conjunction with the defeat of Robert E. Lee at the Battle of Gettysburg the previous day, Vicksburg is widely considered one of the turning points of the war. By July 8, after Banks captured Port Hudson, the entire Mississippi River was in Union hands, and the Confederacy was split in two.

== Tullahoma, Chickamauga, and Chattanooga (June–December 1863) ==
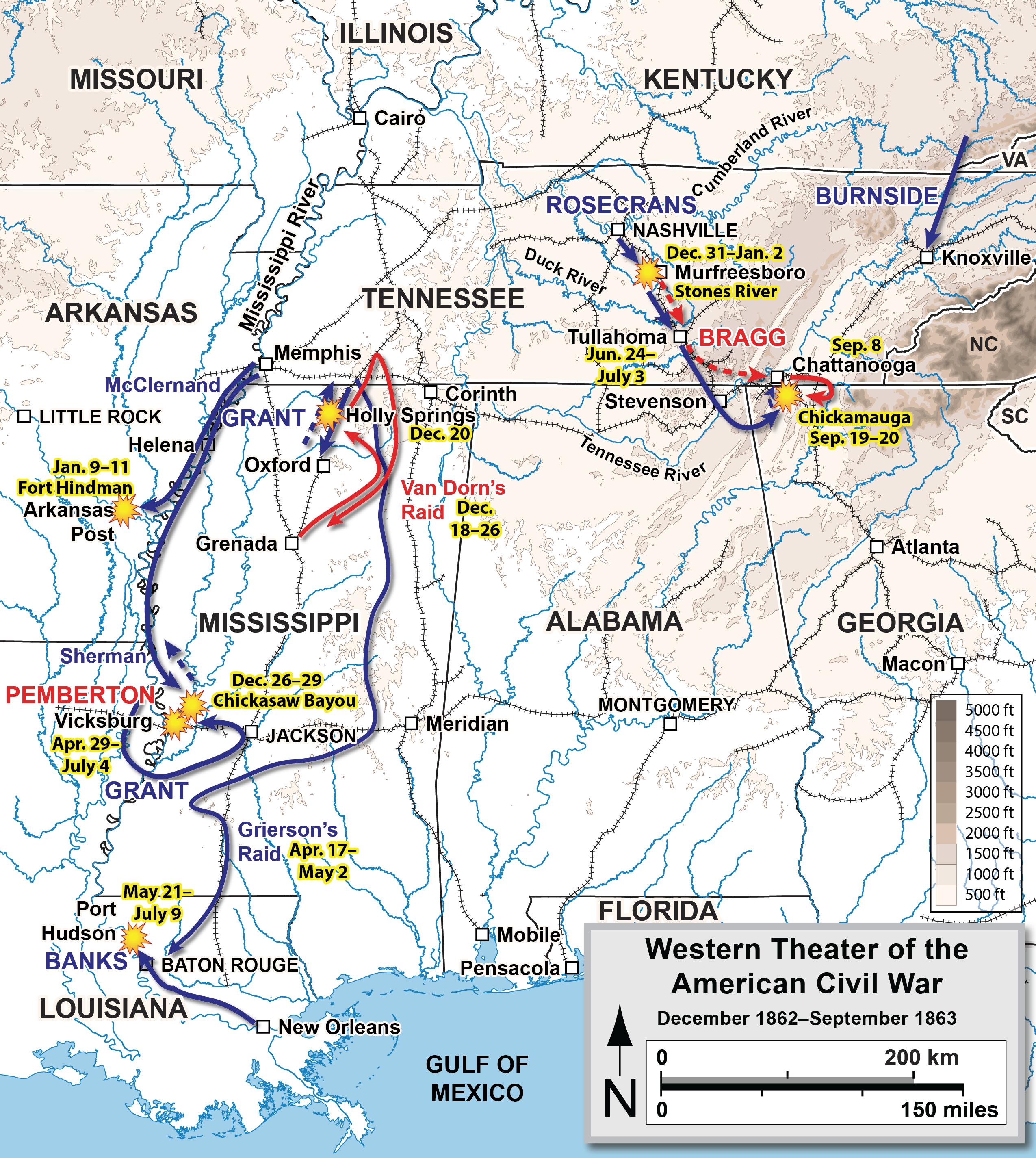
From Vicksburg (December 1862 – July 1863) to Chickamauga (September 1863)

After his victory at Stones River, Rosecrans occupied Murfreesboro for almost six months while Bragg rested in Tullahoma, establishing a long defensive line that was intended to block Union advances against the strategic city of Chattanooga in his rear. In April, Union cavalry under Col. Abel Streight moved against the railroad that supplied Bragg's army in Middle Tennessee, hoping it would cause it to withdraw to Georgia. Streight's brigade raided through Mississippi and Alabama, fighting against Nathan Bedford Forrest. Streight's Raid ended when his exhausted men surrendered near Rome, Georgia, on May 3. In June, Rosecrans finally advanced against Bragg in a brilliant, almost bloodless, campaign of maneuver, the Tullahoma Campaign, and drove Bragg from Middle Tennessee.

During this period, Brig. Gen. John Hunt Morgan and his 2,460 Confederate cavalrymen rode west from Sparta in middle Tennessee on June 11, intending to divert the attention of Ambrose Burnside's Army of the Ohio, which was moving toward Knoxville, from Southern forces in the state. At the start of the Tullahoma Campaign, Morgan moved northward. For 46 days as they rode over 1,000 miles (1,600 km), Morgan's cavalrymen terrorized a region from Tennessee to northern Ohio, destroying bridges, railroads, and government stores before being captured; in November they made a daring escape from the Ohio Penitentiary, at Columbus, Ohio, and returned to the South.

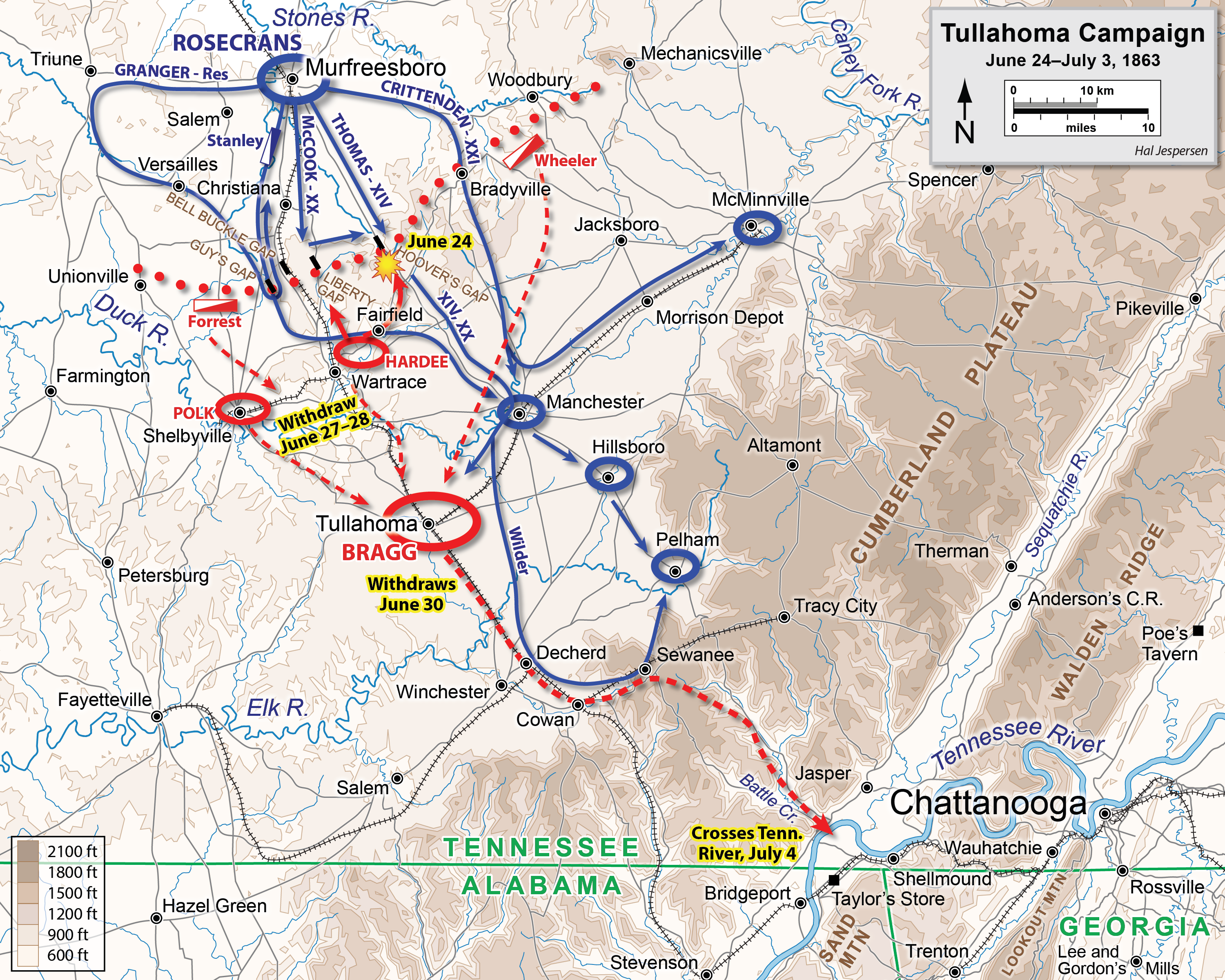
Tullahoma Campaign

After delaying for several weeks in Tullahoma, Rosecrans planned to flush Bragg out of Chattanooga by crossing the Tennessee River, heading south, and interdicting the Confederate supply lines from Georgia. He began operations on August 18 and used a two-week bombardment of Chattanooga as a diversion. The Confederate high command reinforced Bragg with a division from Mississippi as well as a corps previously of the Army of Northern Virginia commanded by James Longstreet. Rosecrans pursued Bragg into the rugged mountains of northwestern Georgia, only to find that a trap had been set. Bragg started the Battle of Chickamauga (September 19–20, 1863) when he launched a three-division assault against Rosecrans's army. A command misunderstanding allowed a major gap to appear in the Union line as reinforcements arrived, and Longstreet was able to drive his corps into that gap and send the Union Army into retreat. If not for the defensive stand by a portion of the line led by the Union XIV Corps, commanded by Major General George H. Thomas ("The Rock of Chickamauga"), the Union Army would have been completely routed. Rosecrans, devastated by his defeat, withdrew his army to Chattanooga, where Bragg besieged it, occupying the high ground dominating the city.

Back in Vicksburg, Grant was resting his army and planning for a campaign that would capture Mobile and push east. But when news of the dire straits of Rosecrans's Army of the Cumberland reached Washington, Grant was ordered to rescue them. On October 17, he was given command of the Military Division of the Mississippi, controlling all of the armies in the western theater. He replaced Rosecrans with Thomas and traveled to Chattanooga, where he approved a plan to open a new supply line (the "Cracker Line"), allowing supplies and reinforcements to reach the city. Soon the troops were joined by 40,000 more, from the Army of the Tennessee under Sherman and from the Army of the Potomac under Joseph Hooker. While the Union army expanded, the Confederate army contracted; Bragg dispatched Longstreet's corps to Knoxville to hold off an advance by Burnside.

Battles of Lookout Mountain and Missionary Ridge, Chattanooga Campaign

The Battles for Chattanooga began in earnest on November 24, 1863, as Hooker took Lookout Mountain, which is one of two dominant peaks over the city. The next day, Grant planned a double envelopment of Bragg's position on the other mountain, Missionary Ridge. Sherman was to attack from the north, Hooker from the south, and Thomas was to hold the center. But Sherman's attack bogged down in confusion, and Grant ordered Thomas to launch a minor attack as a diversion to relieve pressure on Sherman. Thomas's troops continued their initial attack by charging up the imposing ridge, breaking the Confederate line and causing them to retreat. Chattanooga was saved. Combined with the failure of Longstreet's Knoxville Campaign against Burnside, politically sensitive eastern Tennessee was free of Confederate control. An avenue of invasion pointed directly to Atlanta and the heart of the Confederacy. Bragg, whose personal friendship with Confederate President Jefferson Davis saved his command following his defeats at Perryville and Stones River, was finally relieved of duty and replaced by General Joseph E. Johnston.

== Atlanta Campaign (May–September 1864) ==
Map of the Atlanta Campaign

In March 1864, Grant was promoted to lieutenant general and went east to assume command of all the Union armies. Sherman succeeded him in command of the Military Division of the Mississippi. Grant devised a strategy for simultaneous advances across the Confederacy. It was intended to destroy or fix Robert E. Lee's army in Virginia with three major thrusts (under Meade, Butler, and Sigel) launched in the direction of Richmond and in the Shenandoah Valley; capture Mobile with an army under Nathaniel Banks; and destroy Johnston's army while driving toward Atlanta. Most of the initiatives failed: Butler became bogged down in the Bermuda Hundred Campaign; Sigel was quickly defeated in the valley; Banks became occupied in the ill-fated Red River Campaign; Meade and Grant achieved a string of strategic victories during the Overland Campaign, forcing Lee into a brutal siege of Petersburg. Sherman's Atlanta campaign, on the other hand, was an unqualified success.

At the start of the campaign, Sherman's Military Division of the Mississippi consisted of three armies: James B. McPherson's Army of the Tennessee (Sherman's old army under Grant), John M. Schofield's Army of the Ohio, and George H. Thomas's Army of the Cumberland. Opposing him was the Confederate Army of Tennessee, commanded by Joseph E. Johnston. Sherman outnumbered Johnston 98,000 to 50,000, but his ranks were depleted by many furloughed soldiers, and Johnston received 15,000 reinforcements from Alabama in April.

The campaign opened with several battles in May and June 1864 as Sherman pressed Johnston southeast through mountainous terrain. Sherman avoided frontal assaults against most of Johnston's positions, instead maneuvering in flanking marches around the Confederate defenses. When Sherman flanked the defensive lines (almost exclusively around Johnston's left flank), Johnston would retreat to another prepared position. The Battle of Kennesaw Mountain (June 27) was a notable exception, in which Sherman attempted a frontal assault, against the advice of his subordinates, and suffered significant losses, losing 3,000 men versus 1,000 for Johnston. Both armies took advantage of the railroads as supply lines, with Johnston shortening his supply lines as he drew closer to Atlanta, and Sherman lengthening his own. However, Davis was becoming frustrated with Johnston, who he viewed was needlessly losing territory and was refusing to counterattack or even discuss his plans with Davis.

Just before the Battle of Peachtree Creek (July 20) in the outskirts of Atlanta, Jefferson Davis lost patience with Johnston's strategy and, fearing that Johnston would give up Atlanta without a battle, replaced him with the more aggressive Lt. Gen. John Bell Hood. Over the next six weeks, Hood would repeatedly attempt to attack a portion of Sherman's force which seemed isolated from the main body; each attack failed, often with heavy casualties for the Confederate army. Sherman eventually cut Hood's supply lines from the south. Knowing that he was trapped, Hood evacuated Atlanta on the night of September 1, burning military supplies and installations, causing a great conflagration in the city.

== Franklin-Nashville Campaign (September–December 1864) ==
Franklin-Nashville Campaign

While Sherman rested his army in preparation for offensive operations to the east, Hood embarked on a campaign to defeat Sherman by interfering with his lines of communications from Chattanooga. He drove west through Alabama and turned north toward Tennessee, hoping that Sherman would follow him and do battle. This was partially effective because his movements, and raids by Nathan Bedford Forrest, were causing considerable consternation to Sherman. Sherman thought Hood's strategy to be folly. Even stating "If Hood takes his army to the Ohio River I’d give him rations". The confederate western army was already greatly reduced and The Federal Western Command had more than enough men in reserve to deal with Hood's invasion. Leaving Sherman virtually unopposed taking 65,000 men and marching through Georgia to the Sea. He sent Maj. Gen. George H. Thomas with portions of the Army of the Cumberland and most of the cavalry corps to Nashville to coordinate a defense against Hood, while taking the remainder of his army in the direction of Savannah, Georgia.

Thomas's forces were divided: half were with him in Nashville and the other half with John M. Schofield, moving in pursuit from Atlanta, with other troops due to arrive from the Red River Campaign. Hood hoped to defeat Schofield before he could join forces with Thomas and before the reinforcements from Louisiana arrived. He had the chance at the Battle of Spring Hill in Tennessee (November 29, 1864), but the Union troops were able to slip through the trap, due to the Confederate failure to cut the Columbia-to-Franklin turnpike in the Union rear. At the Battle of Franklin the following day, Hood launched repeated massive frontal assaults against strong entrenchments and suffered severe casualties. The battle of Franklin cost the confederacy far too many experienced officers and men. David J. Eicher wrote that Hood mortally wounded his army at Franklin but killed it at the Battle of Nashville Schofield although taking high casualties was able to retreat in good order to Nashville. The Battle of Franklin had been a blunder the South could not afford. December 15–16. At Nashville, facing the combined force of Schofield and Thomas, he dug in a few miles south of the city and waited, hoping that Thomas would wreck his army on the Confederate fortifications. After a two-week preparation period in winter weather, during which he received great pressure from Grant and the Union government to attack, Thomas unleashed an overwhelming assault that sent Hood and his survivors in retreat to Franklin and then to Mississippi, never to recover as a fighting force. There are stories of Federal cavalry pursuing the fleeing Confederates up to 100 miles over the next week. The western army was nothing but a shadow of its former self. Many men chose to desert because of the overall leadership that had been lost, Hood's poor planning and tactics leading to disaster in battle, and the realization by many that the war was truly over. By his own request, Hood was relieved of command of the Army of Tennessee and Lt. Gen. Richard Taylor was appointed temporary commander of the army.

== Sherman's March to the Sea (November–December 1864) ==
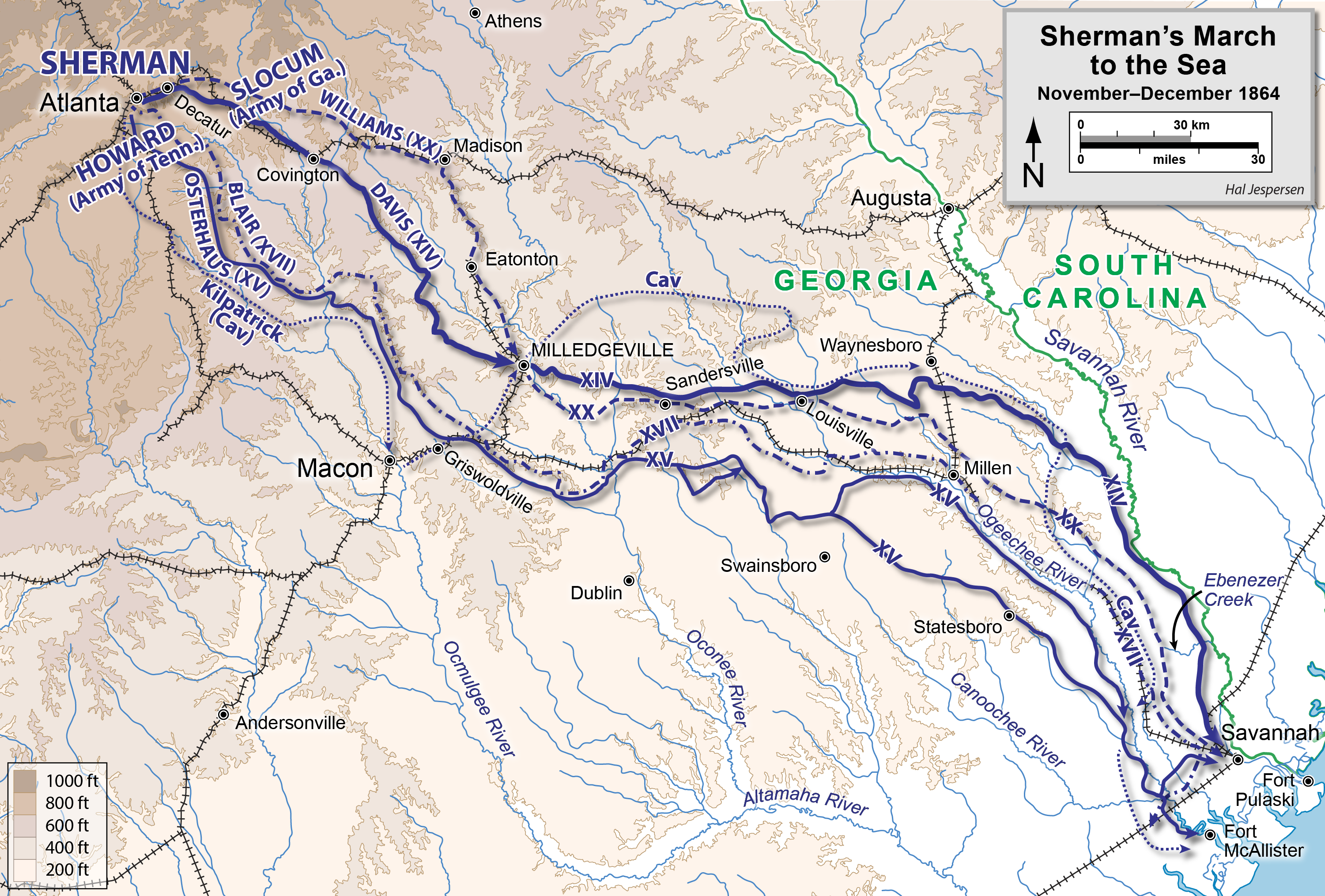
Sherman's March to the Sea

Sherman's Savannah Campaign is more popularly known as the March to the Sea. He and Grant believed that the Civil War would end only if the Confederacy's strategic, economic, and psychological capacity for warfare were decisively broken. Sherman therefore applied the principles of scorched earth, ordering his troops to burn crops, kill livestock, consume supplies, and destroy civilian infrastructure along their path. This policy is one of the key tenets of a strategy of total war.

Sherman's army left Atlanta on November 15, 1864, and was conducted in two columns separated by about 60 miles (97 km), the right under Maj. Gen. Oliver Otis Howard and the left under Maj. Gen. Henry Warner Slocum. Between these columns, the destruction was significant and spawned hatred for generations. Most of the resistance to Sherman's armies was from Georgia militia and home guards, although Joseph Wheeler's cavalry corps from the Army of Tennessee and some troops from the Department of South Carolina, Georgia, and Florida were also present but scattered. At Savannah on December 17, Sherman encountered about 10,000 defending troops under Maj. Gen. William J. Hardee. Following lengthy artillery bombardments, Hardee abandoned the city and Sherman entered on December 22, 1864. He telegraphed to President Lincoln, "I beg to present you as a Christmas gift the City of Savannah ...."

== Carolinas Campaign and Johnston's surrender (February–April 1865) ==
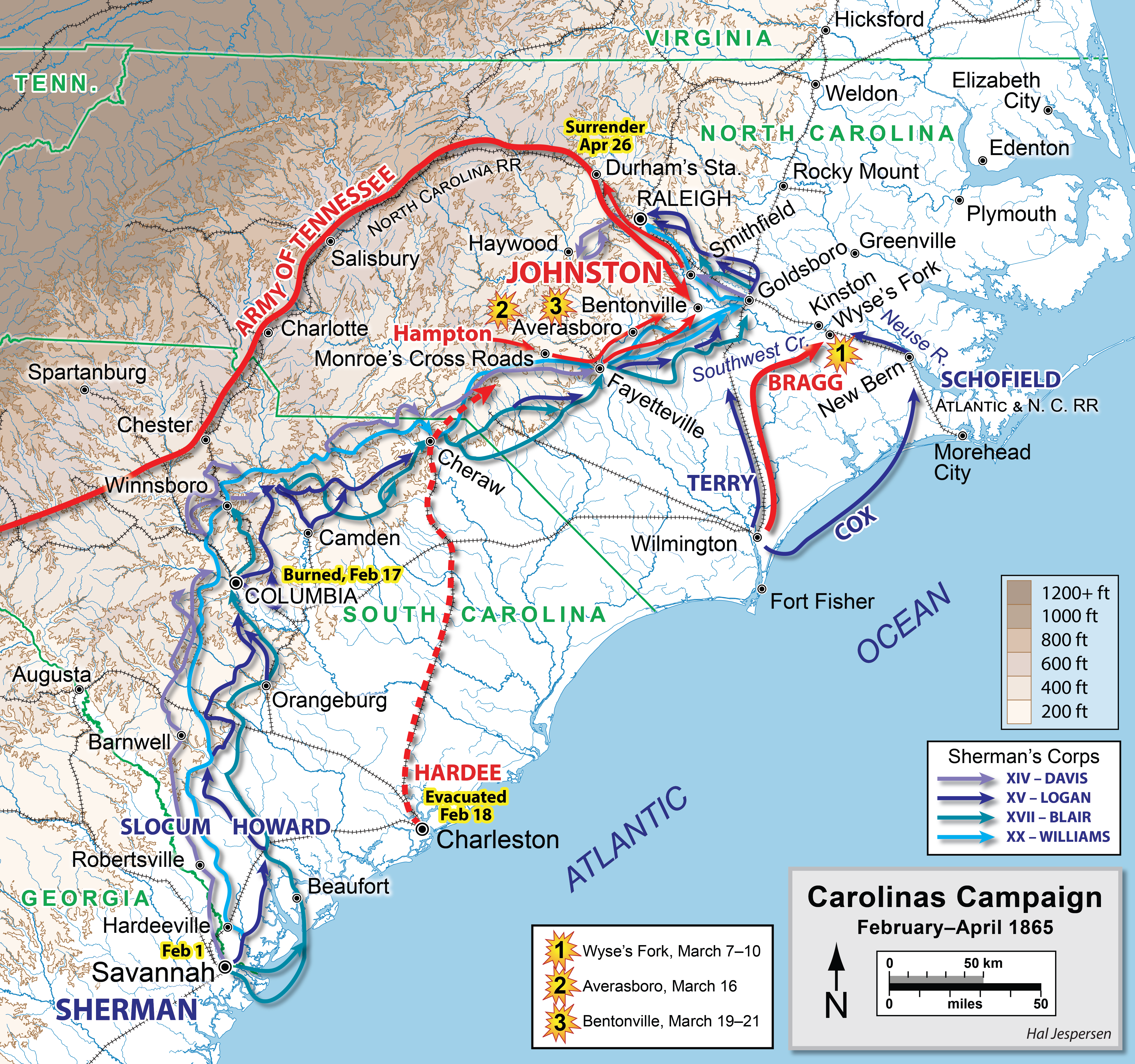
Carolinas Campaign

After Sherman captured Savannah, he was ordered by Grant to embark his army on ships to reinforce the Union armies in Virginia, where Grant was bogged down in the Siege of Petersburg against Robert E. Lee. Sherman proposed an alternative strategy. He persuaded Grant that he should march north through the Carolinas instead, destroying everything of military value along the way, similar to his march to the sea through Georgia. He was particularly interested in targeting South Carolina, the first state to secede from the Union, for the effect it would have on Southern morale.

Sherman's plan was to bypass the minor Confederate troop concentrations at Augusta, Georgia, and Charleston, South Carolina, and reach Goldsboro, North Carolina, by March 15, 1865, where he would unite with Union forces commanded by John M. Schofield and Alfred H. Terry. As with his Georgia operations, he marched his armies in multiple directions simultaneously, confusing the scattered Confederate defenders as to his first true objective, which was the state capital Columbia. He faced the smaller and battered Army of Tennessee, again under the command of Gen. Joseph E. Johnston. On February 17, Columbia surrendered to Sherman. Fires began in the city, and most of the central city was destroyed. The burning of Columbia has engendered controversy ever since, with some claiming the fires were accidental, others a deliberate act of vengeance. On that same day, the Confederates evacuated Charleston. On February 18, Sherman's forces destroyed virtually anything of military value in Columbia. The last significant Confederate seaport, Wilmington, surrendered on February 22.

When Confederate President Jefferson Davis and general-in-chief Robert E. Lee felt that Beauregard could not properly handle the Union threat, they appointed Johnston to command the Confederate forces in the Carolinas, including the remnants of the Army of Tennessee. Concentrating his forces, which he named the Army of the South, Johnston attacked at the Battle of Bentonville (March 19–21), where he unsuccessfully attempted to defeat one wing of Sherman's army (under Henry W. Slocum) before it could reach Goldsboro or reunite with the other wing under Oliver O. Howard. While the initial Confederate attack overwhelmed the first Union line, Slocum was able to rally enough men to resist Johnston until Howard arrived at the battlefield overnight. Johnston remained on the battlefield for two more days, hoping for another Confederate victory similar to the Battle of Kennesaw Mountain, then retreated back to Raleigh, pursued by Sherman.

On April 11, Johnston received word that General Robert E. Lee surrendered at Appomattox Court House; this induced him to send a message to Sherman requesting terms for surrender. On April 18, three days after the assassination of Abraham Lincoln, Johnston signed an armistice with Sherman at Bennett Place, a farmhouse near Durham Station. Sherman got himself into political trouble by offering terms of surrender to Johnston that encompassed political issues as well as military, without authorization from Grant or the United States government. This created confusion on this issue, which lasted until April 26, when Johnston agreed to purely military terms, similar to the terms offered to Lee at Appomattox Court House, and formally surrendered his army and all Confederate forces in the Carolinas, Georgia, and Florida.

== Wilson's Raid, Mobile Campaign, and Forrest's surrender (March–May 1865) ==
Following the victory in Nashville, Maj. Gen. Thomas dispatched Maj. Gen. James H. Wilson to destroy the last remaining industrial infrastructure in the Confederate heartlands of Alabama and Georgia and Maj. Gen. Edward R. S. Canby to finally capture Mobile, which had remained in Confederate hands despite Admiral Farragut's victory in Mobile Bay.

Wilson, commanding the cavalry corps of the Military Division of the Mississippi, launched a raid in late March into central Alabama with orders to destroy the remaining Confederate industry in the region, especially at Elyton (present-day Birmingham) and Selma. The only force remaining to resist Wilson was Nathan B. Forrest's cavalry force. Elyton fell to Union forces on March 29, before Forrest had time to concentrate his troops. A detachment led by Brig. General John T. Croxton destroyed the area's factories and on April 4 burned down the University of Alabama in Tuscaloosa. Selma was captured on April 2 following a battle, which was Forrest's final battle and defeat. After destroying Selma's factories and railroads, Wilson continued eastward towards Georgia. He had to capture the bridge across the Chattahoochee River at Columbus, Georgia, with a battle, then he continued on to Macon; here on April 21, he received word from Sherman to "desist from further acts of war and devastation until you hear that hostilities are renewed".

Canby, commanding the Military Division of West Mississippi, landed in mid-March near the entrance of Mobile Bay and advanced along the eastern shore to Spanish Fort, where the Union forces started a siege on March 27. On April 1, Union forces commanded by Frederick Steele arrived from an overland route from Pensacola and started besieging Fort Blakely. On April 8, Union forces opened an artillery bombardment on Spanish fort with ninety field pieces, followed by an infantry attack that captured a foothold in the Confederate entrenchments known as Fort McDermott. The Confederate garrison, commanded by Brigadier General Randall Gibson, managed to hold off the Union forces until nightfall, when they were then evacuated by a treadway that had been constructed across the swamps to a nearby island from which they could continue the retreat, thereby saving their garrison from the fate that awaited the troops holding Fort Blakely the next day, as most of them were captured. These battles forced the Confederate commander of Mobile, Maj. Gen. Dabney H. Maury, to evacuate the city.

When he received word of Lee's and Johnston's surrenders, Lt. Gen. Richard Taylor, commander of the Confederate Department of Alabama, Mississippi, and East Louisiana, surrendered his forces to Canby on May 4, while Forrest formally surrendered his force on May 9. Wilson's cavalry officially took control of Tallahassee, Florida, on May 20, the last Confederate state capital east of the Mississippi to be captured, completing the western theater operations. A detachment of Wilson's cavalry captured Confederate President Jefferson Davis on May 10 near Irwinville, Georgia.

== Major land battles ==
The costliest land battles in the western theater, measured by casualties (killed, wounded, captured, and missing), were:

Battle	State	Date	United States		Union	Confederacy	United States		Total
Battle	State	Date	Strength		Commander		Casualties		
Siege of Vicksburg	Mississippi	May 18–July 4, 1863	77,000	33,000	Ulysses S. Grant	John C. Pemberton	4,835	32,697	37,532
Battle of Chickamauga	Georgia	September 19–20, 1863	60,000	65,000	William S. Rosecrans	Braxton Bragg	16,170	18,454	34,624
Battle of Stones River	Tennessee	December 31, 1862 – January 2, 1863	41,400	35,000	William S. Rosecrans	Braxton Bragg	12,906	11,739	24,645
Battle of Shiloh	Tennessee	April 6–7, 1862	63,000	44,699	Ulysses S. Grant	Albert Sidney Johnston	13,047	10,699	23,746
Siege of Port Hudson	Louisiana	May 22 – July 9, 1863	35,000	7,500	Nathaniel P. Banks	Franklin Gardner	10,000	7,500	17,500
Battle of Missionary Ridge	Tennessee	November 25, 1863	56,359	44,010	Ulysses S. Grant	Braxton Bragg	5,824	6,667	12,491
Battle of Atlanta	Georgia	July 22, 1864	34,863	40,438	William T. Sherman	John Bell Hood	3,641	8,499	12,140
Battle of Nashville	Tennessee	December 15–16, 1864	55,000	30,000	George H. Thomas	John Bell Hood	3,061	6,000	9,061
Battle of Franklin	Tennessee	November 30, 1864	27,000	27,000	John M. Schofield	John Bell Hood	2,326	6,252	8,578
Battle of Perryville	Kentucky	October 8, 1862	22,000	16,000	Don Carlos Buell	Braxton Bragg	4,276	3,401	7,677
2nd Battle of Corinth	Mississippi	October 3–4, 1862	23,000	22,000	William S. Rosecrans	Earl Van Dorn	2,520	4,233	6,753
Battle of Peachtree Creek	Georgia	July 20, 1864	21,655	20,250	George H. Thomas	John Bell Hood	1,710	4,796	6,506
Battle of Champion Hill	Mississippi	May 16, 1863	32,000	22,000	Ulysses S. Grant	John C. Pemberton	2,457	3,840	6,297
Battle of Richmond, Kentucky	Kentucky	August 29–30, 1862	6,500	6,850	William "Bull" Nelson	Edmund K. Smith	5,353	451	5,804

== See also ==
- Civil War Museum of the Western Theater
