= George Mason Lovering =

Union Army soldier and Medal of Honor recipient

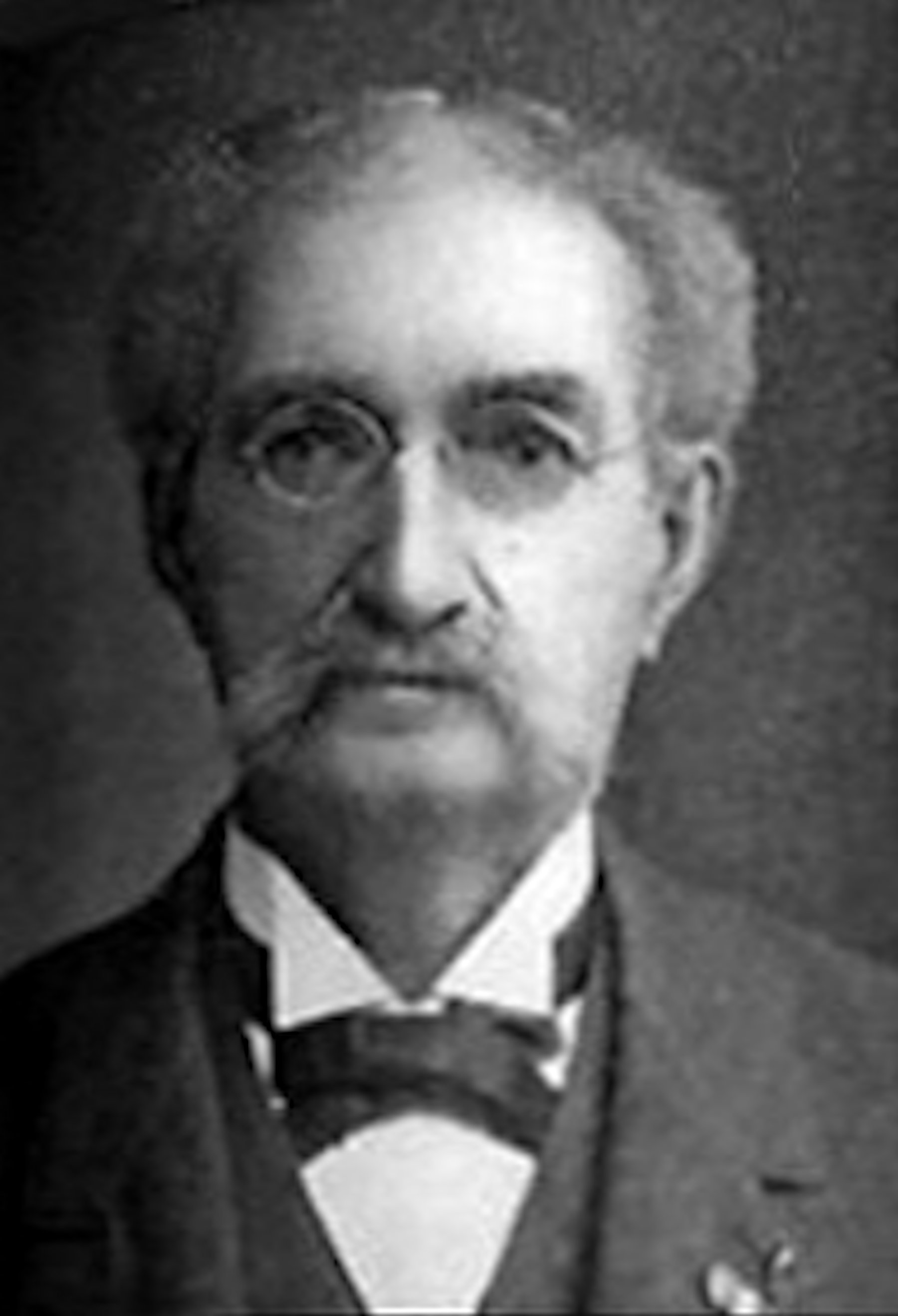
- Born: January 10, 1832; Springfield, New Hampshire, US
- Died: April 2, 1919 (aged 87); Lewiston, Maine, US
- Burial place: Union Cemetery; Holbrook, Massachusetts, US
- Military career
- Allegiance: United States of America; Union
- Branch: (United States) Union Army
- Rank: First Lieutenant
- Units: 4th Massachusetts Militia Regiment; 75th United States Colored Troops
- Conflicts: American Civil War: Siege of Port Hudson; Red River Campaign
- Awards: Medal of Honor

George Mason Lovering (January 10, 1832 – April 2, 1919) was a Union Army soldier who received the Medal of Honor for meritorious service during the American Civil War.

== Biography ==
He was born to James and Catherine Lovering on January 10, 1832, in Springfield, New Hampshire. The family soon moved to East Randolph (now Holbrook, Massachusetts), and George eventually joined the Randolph Light Infantry, a militia unit that was called into active service at the start of the Civil War. He served as First Sergeant in Company I of the 4th Massachusetts Militia Regiment. On June 14, 1863, Lovering took part in the Siege of Port Hudson, a Confederate stronghold on the Mississippi River. His courage in this battle resulted in Lovering being awarded a Medal of Honor in 1891, the only such recipient from Holbrook.

Lovering was commissioned as a First Lieutenant in the renamed 75th Regiment of U.S. Colored Troops, which was formed from the 3rd Infantry Corps d'Afrique. He participated in the Red River Campaign, then served in the bayous of Louisiana until he was mustered out in 1865.

He eventually moved to Maine, spending his final years living at a veterans home. He died at the age of 87 at St. Mary's Hospital in Lewiston, Maine. He is buried in Union Cemetery in Holbrook.

== Medal of Honor citation ==
Rank and organization: First Sergeant, Company I, 4th Massachusetts Infantry. Place and date: At Port Hudson, La., June 14, 1863. Entered service at: East Randolph, Mass. Born: January 10, 1832, Springfield, N.H. Date of issue: November 19, 1891.

Citation:

During a momentary confusion in the ranks caused by other troops rushing upon the regiment, this soldier, with coolness and determination, rendered efficient aid in preventing a panic among the troops.

== See also ==
- List of Medal of Honor recipients
- List of American Civil War Medal of Honor recipients: G–L
