= Siege of Port Hudson =

Battle of the American Civil War

Coordinates: 30°41′38″N 91°16′35″W

- Part of the American Civil War
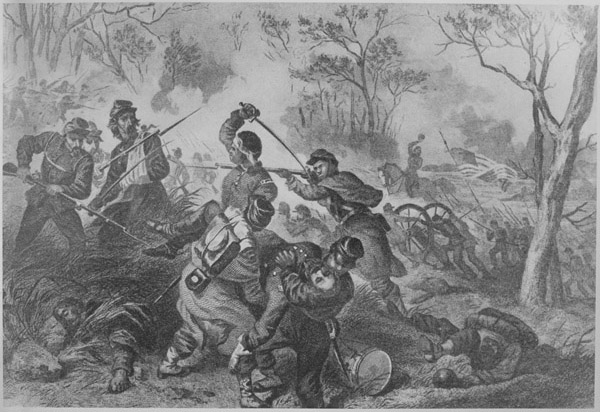
- A Fierce Assault on Port Hudson, newspaper illustration of the attacks on the fortifications of Port Hudson
Date	May 22 – July 9, 1863 (1 month, 2 weeks and 3 days)
Location	East Baton Rouge Parish and East Feliciana Parish, Louisiana
Result	Union victory

Belligerents
United States	Confederate States

Commanders and leaders
Nathaniel P. Banks	Franklin Gardner (surrendered)

Units involved
XIX Corps	Department of Mississippi and East Louisiana, Port Hudson

Strength
~30,000–40,000	~7,500

Casualties and losses
~5,000 killed and wounded: 707 killed in combat; 3,336 wounded; 319 missing; ~5,000 died of disease	~750 killed and wounded 250 died of disease 6,340 surrendered

The siege of Port Hudson (May 22 – July 9, 1863) was the final engagement in the Union campaign to recapture the Mississippi River in the American Civil War. While Union General Ulysses Grant was besieging Vicksburg upriver, General Nathaniel Banks was ordered to capture the lower Mississippi Confederate stronghold of Port Hudson, Louisiana, then to go to Grant's aid. When his assault failed, Banks settled into a 48-day siege, the longest in US military history up to that point. A second attack also failed, and it was only after the fall of Vicksburg that the Confederate commander, General Franklin Gardner, surrendered the port. The Union gained control of the river and navigation from the Gulf of Mexico through the Deep South and to the river's upper reaches.

== Background ==
=== Strategy and politics on the Mississippi ===
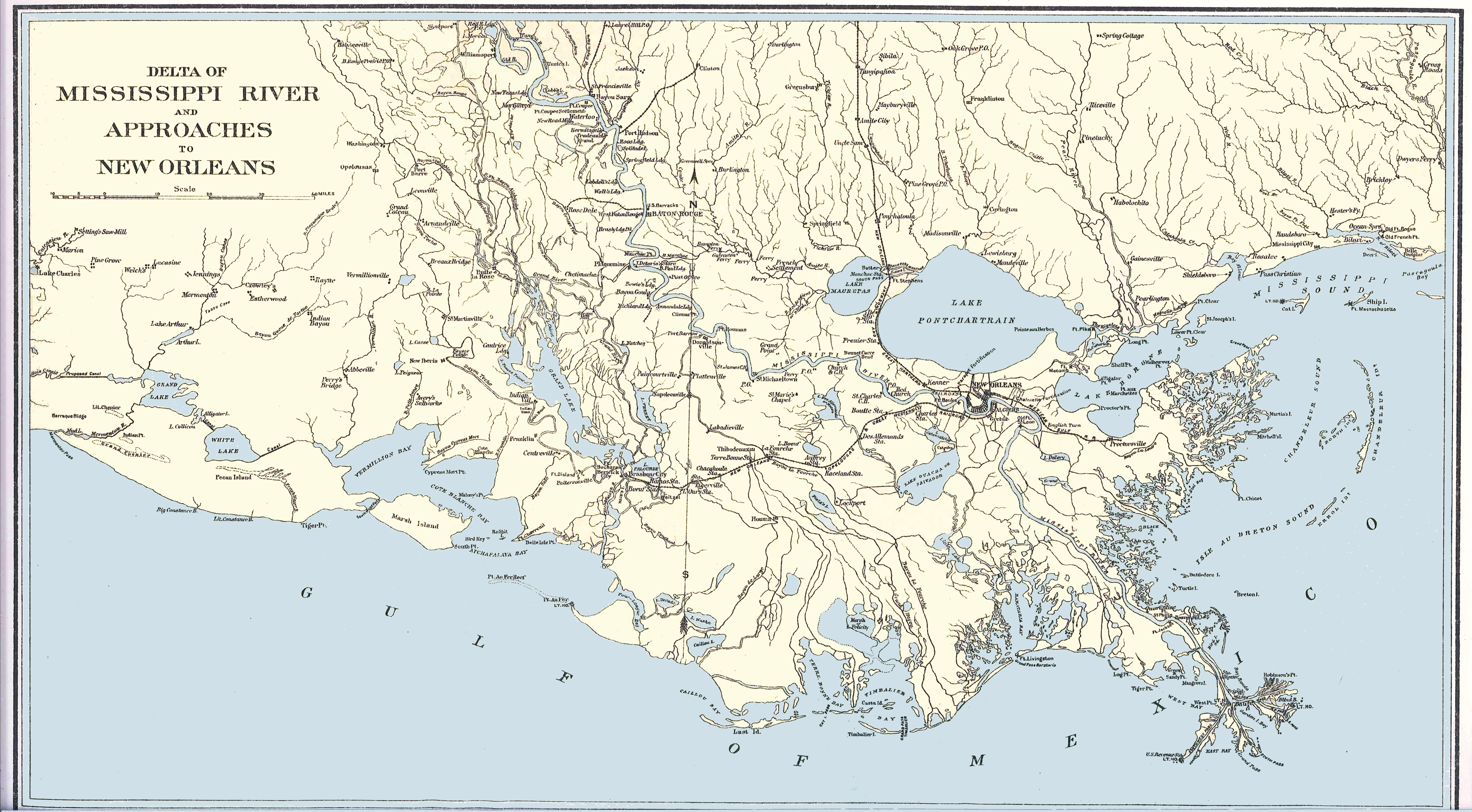
Map showing Louisiana and lower Mississippi as it was during the Civil War. This map was printed by the Government printing office in 1904 as part of the Official Records of the Union and Confederate Navies.

From the time the American Civil War started in April 1861, both the U.S. and Confederates made controlling the Mississippi River a major part of their strategy. The Confederacy wanted to keep using the river to transport needed supplies; the Union wanted to stop this supply route and drive a wedge that would divide Confederate states and territories. Particularly important to the South was the stretch of the Mississippi that included the mouth of the Red River. The Red was the Confederacy's primary route for moving vital supplies between east and west: salt, cattle, and horses traveled downstream from the Trans-Mississippi West; in the opposite direction flowed men and munitions from the east.

In the spring and early summer of 1862, the Union advanced their control of the Mississippi from both the north and the south. From the mouth of the river, a fleet commanded by Flag Officer David G. Farragut fought its way through Confederate fortifications in the Battle of Forts Jackson and St. Philip, resulting in the capture of New Orleans. A second Union fleet commanded by Charles H. Davis occupied Memphis, Tennessee, after defeating Confederate riverine forces in the First Battle of Memphis. To make sure it could continue to use the middle section of the river, the South fortified positions at both Vicksburg and Port Hudson.

The initial idea of fortifying the heights of Port Hudson came from the south's master of fixed defenses, General Pierre G.T. Beauregard, Commander, Army of the Mississippi. Writing to Major General Mansfield Lovell, Commander of the lower Mississippi in March 1862, Beauregard recommended, "...the fortification of Port Hudson as a measure of precaution against the fall of our defenses north of Memphis." In June 1862, Major General Earl Van Dorn wrote Jefferson Davis: "I want Baton Rouge and Port Hudson". A few days after the fall of Baton Rouge to the Union, Confederate General John C. Breckinridge with 4,000 men, carried out the wishes of General Van Dorn by occupying Port Hudson, situated between Baton Rouge and Bayou Sara, with troops under the command of General Daniel Ruggles. Soldiers of the 4th Louisiana Infantry arrived at the site on August 15, 1862.

According to historian John D. Winters, "Port Hudson, unlike Baton Rouge, was one of the strongest points on the river, and batteries placed upon the bluffs could command the entire river front." It was a position similar to that of Quebec City on the St. Lawrence River in the French and Indian War.

The political momentum behind the Union actions against Port Hudson came from the elections of November 1862. The Republican base, centered in Ohio, Indiana, and Illinois, had been shaken by embarrassing Democratic victories. A dramatic letter from Indiana Governor Oliver P. Morton to Lincoln claimed that "The fate of the North-West is trembling in the balance." His implication was that unless the independent trade of Union states along the Ohio River was restored by Union control of the entire Mississippi, further breakup of the Union was possible. Morton believed the states of Ohio, Indiana, and Illinois were in danger of breaking away from the Northeast to join the Confederacy, which was increasingly becoming the more lucrative opportunity. In addition, the southern areas of these states had been settled by people from the South, many of whom maintained their identification with that region and its culture.

The threat of political fractures galvanized the Lincoln administration into action. Major General Nathanial Banks was diverted from a possible expedition to Texas and given Benjamin Butler's command of the Department of the Gulf. The Union commander of all armies, Henry Wager Halleck, said to Banks that President Lincoln "regards the opening of the Mississippi River as the first and most important of all our military and naval operations, and it is hoped that you will not lose a moment in accomplishing it." On December 4, 1862, Banks and his expedition put to sea for New Orleans.

In May 1863, Union land and naval forces began a campaign they hoped would give them control of the full length of the Mississippi River. One army under Maj. Gen. Ulysses S. Grant commenced operations against the Confederacy's fortified position at Vicksburg at the northern end of the stretch of the river still in Southern hands, while another army under Maj. Gen. Nathaniel P. Banks simultaneously attacked Port Hudson at the southern end.

=== Foundation of a fortress ===
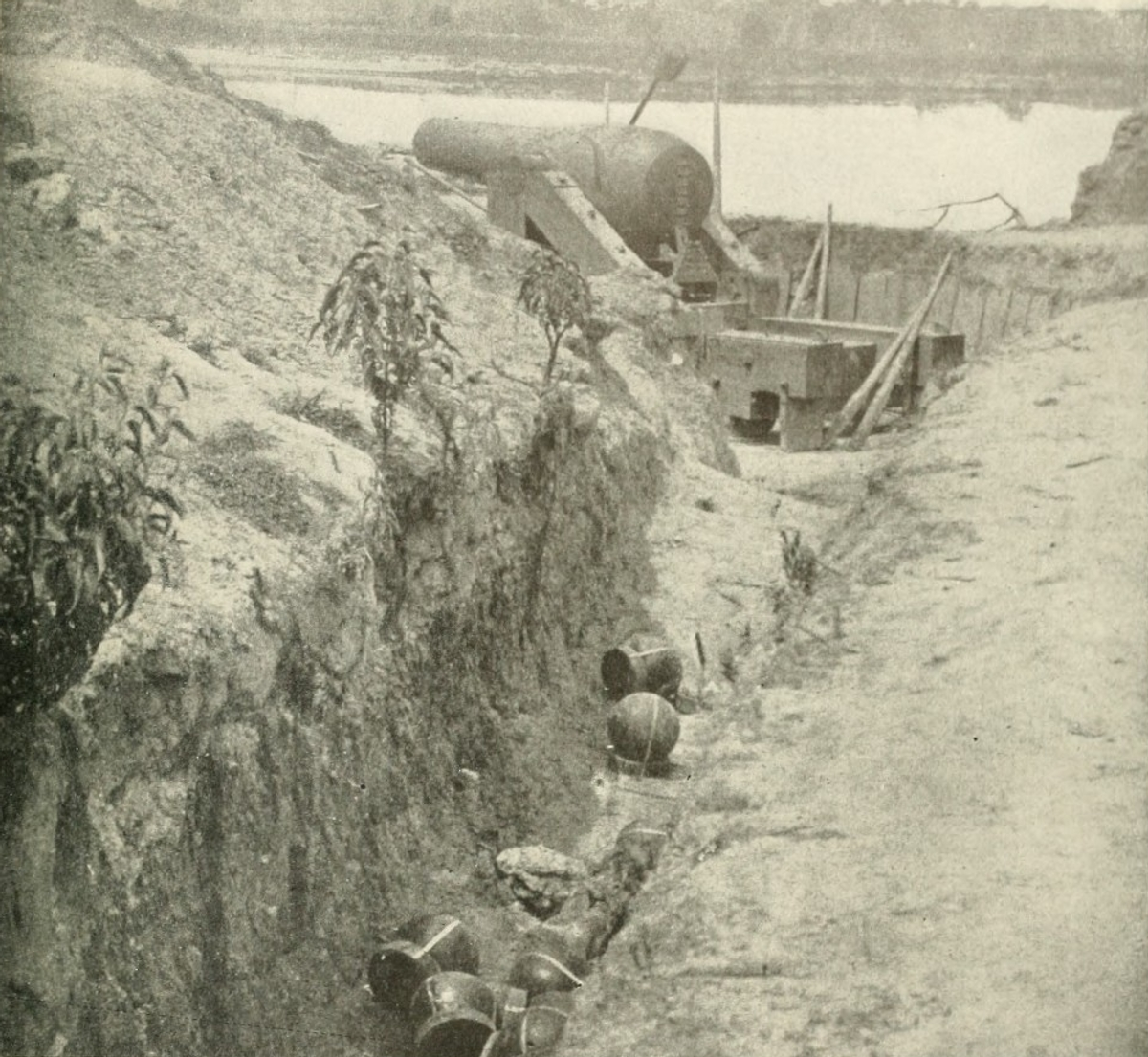
Barbette position at Port Hudson mounting a 10-inch (254 mm) Columbiad. This type of cannon would use a 102-pound (46 kg) shell, projected from a smooth bore. The cylindrical object on a pole leaning against the breech of the gun is the sponge used to extinguish any remaining embers and clean the bore after every shot. The smaller wooden poles leaning against the parapet and gun carriage are the trailspikes used to train the gun and reposition it forward on the carriage after every shot. The scattered ammunition behind the gun in the communication trench consists of 9.9-inch (250 mm) roundshot or shell held with strap iron to a wooden wad or sabot. The image was probably made after the fall of Port Hudson.

Port Hudson was sited on an 80-foot (24 m) bluff on the east bank above a hairpin turn in the Mississippi River 25 miles (40 km) upriver from Baton Rouge. The hills and ridges in the area of the town represented extremely rough terrain, a maze of deep, thickly forested ravines, swamps, and cane brakes creating a natural fortress. The town was a port for shipping cotton and sugar downriver from the surrounding area. Despite its importance, the city had only a few buildings and 200 people at the start of the war. The river had shifted south and the docks had been moved about 1/2 mi (0.80 km) south.

In 1862, a railroad was constructed to the town of Clinton, 19 mi (31 km) to the northeast. The entire length of the Port Hudson and Clinton railroad was 21 mi (34 km). It did not connect with the New Orleans, Jackson, and Great Northern railroad that connected Louisiana with other states and with Camp Moore, the main mustering point for Confederate forces in the department. Also by 1862 the railroad was run down, the track consisting of strips of iron nailed flat to rotten ties. The entire rolling stock consisted of one locomotive, one passenger car, and six box and flat cars. This train could accommodate only a few hundred troops at the most and was inadequate for hauling heavy guns and their ammunition. This lack of transport independent of the river would limit the defensibility of Port Hudson.

Initial plans for fortifications were drawn up with the assistance of Captain James Nocquet, chief engineer for General Breckinridge. Along with loaning his engineering staff, Breckinridge also authorized Ruggles to gather needed supplies and tools using the Clinton and Port Hudson railroad, and whatever labor the area could provide for construction. Three different layouts for earthworks were considered: a central fort mounting cannon supported by angled outworks, a line of lunettes arranged along a 400-yard (370 m) line, and a continuous ring of redoubts, trenches, and parapets surrounding the entire position.

The first option was rejected for concentrating the positions armament into too small a target, and thus making it too vulnerable to bombardment. The third option was rejected because a siege was considered unlikely, and the task of building such extensive works too ambitious since the circumference of the ring would have been eight miles (13 km.) and required 35,000 men and 70 pieces of artillery for defense. The line of lunettes was determined to be the best plan for the defense of the Port Hudson heights, and construction started on a line of seven fronting the river.

General Breckinridge was soon ordered to take most of his troops to Kentucky, however, and on August 18 he left, leaving only 1,500 men to work on the fortifications under Ruggles's command. Ruggles did have a forty-two-pounder smoothbore cannon, which he mounted immediately, manned by former sailors of the CSS Arkansas, which had been destroyed in the Battle of Baton Rouge that year. Two thirty-two-pounders were shortly added from the abandoned wreck of the USS Sumter.

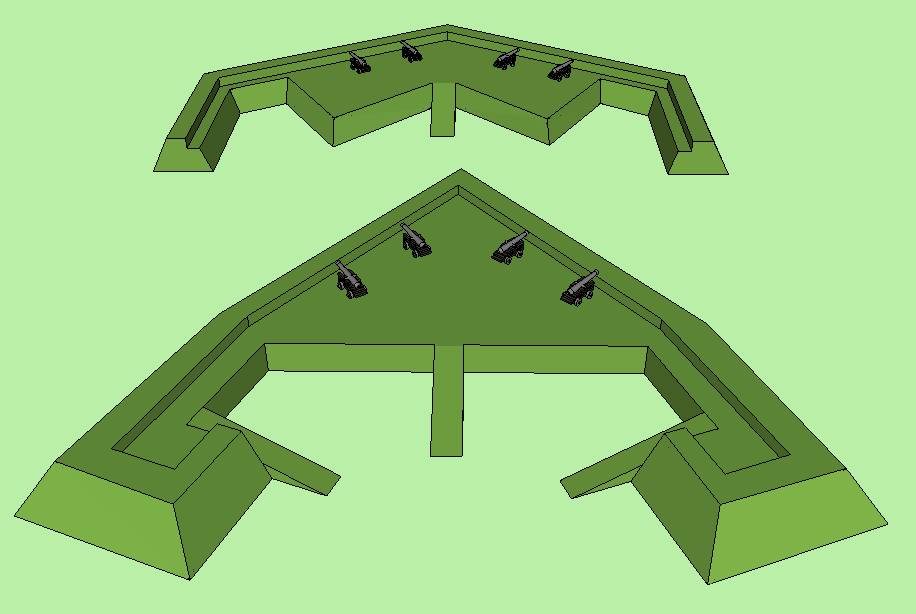
Lunettes mounting artillery, as used at Port Hudson.

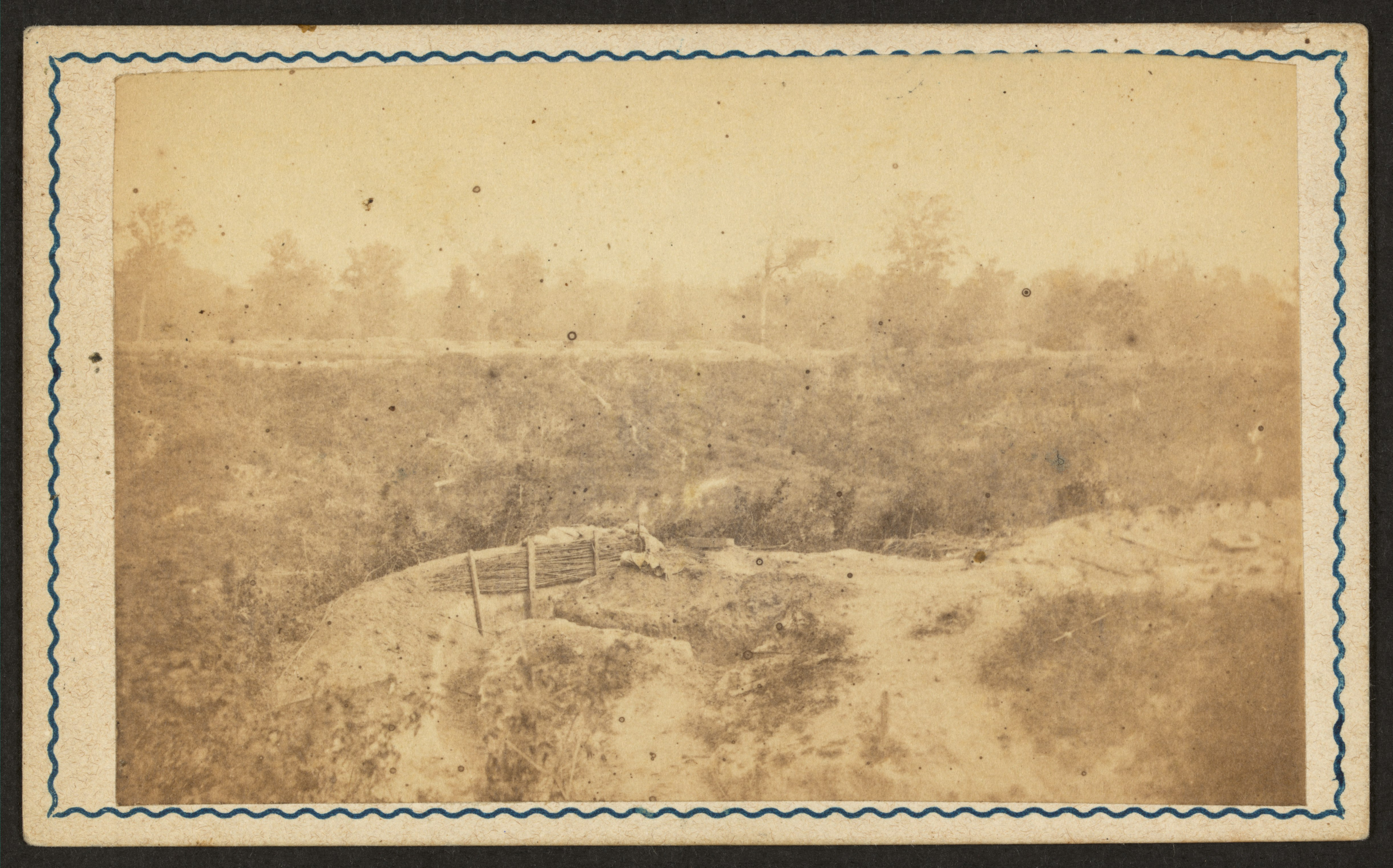
Photograph of the earthworks and one of the deep, forested ravines that defended Port Hudson, 1863–1864, Library of Congress collection.

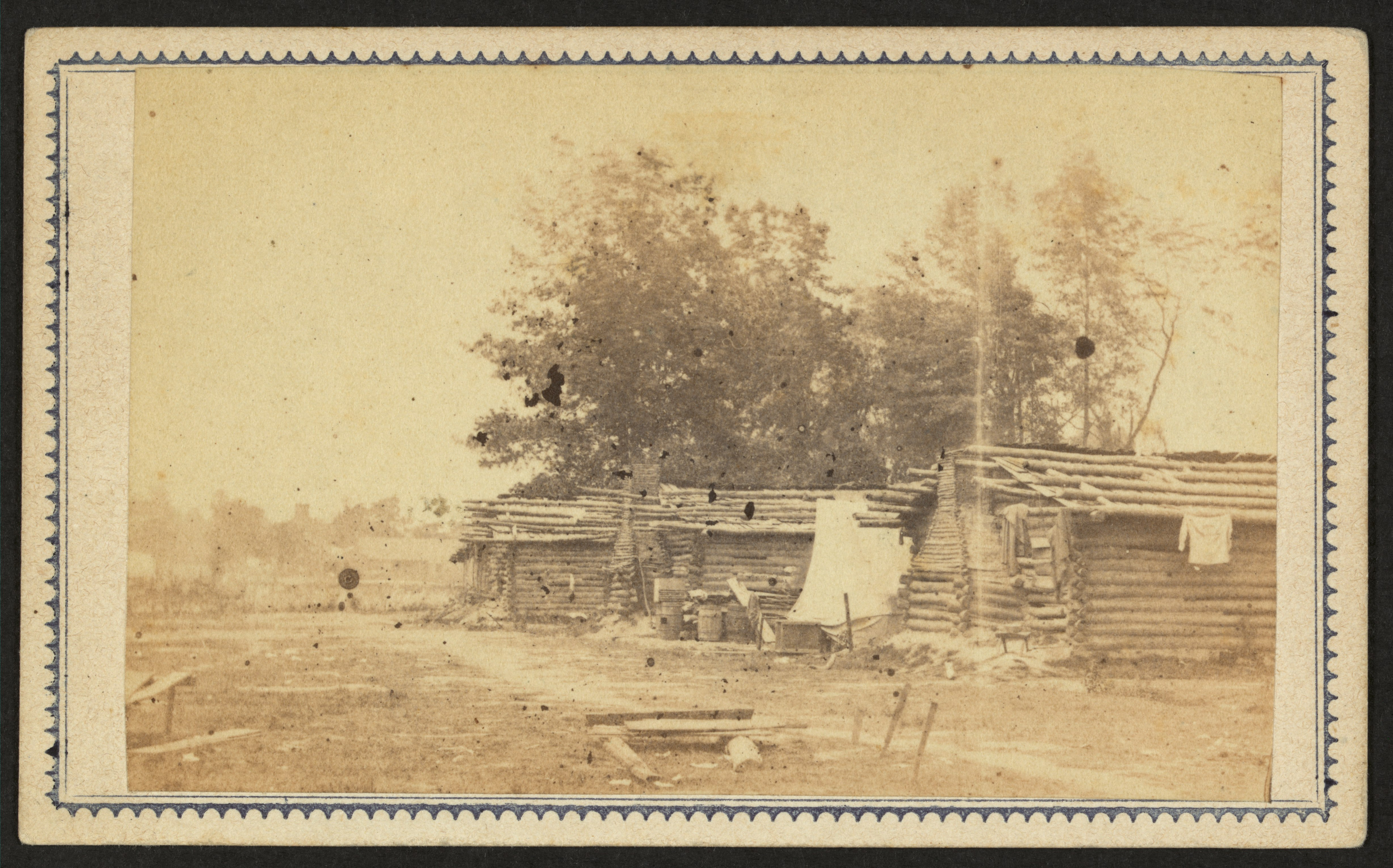
Garrison Housing – Locally improvised Confederate structures that provided housing for the Port Hudson garrison, 1863–1864, Library of Congress collection.

=== Union Navy assesses the defenses ===
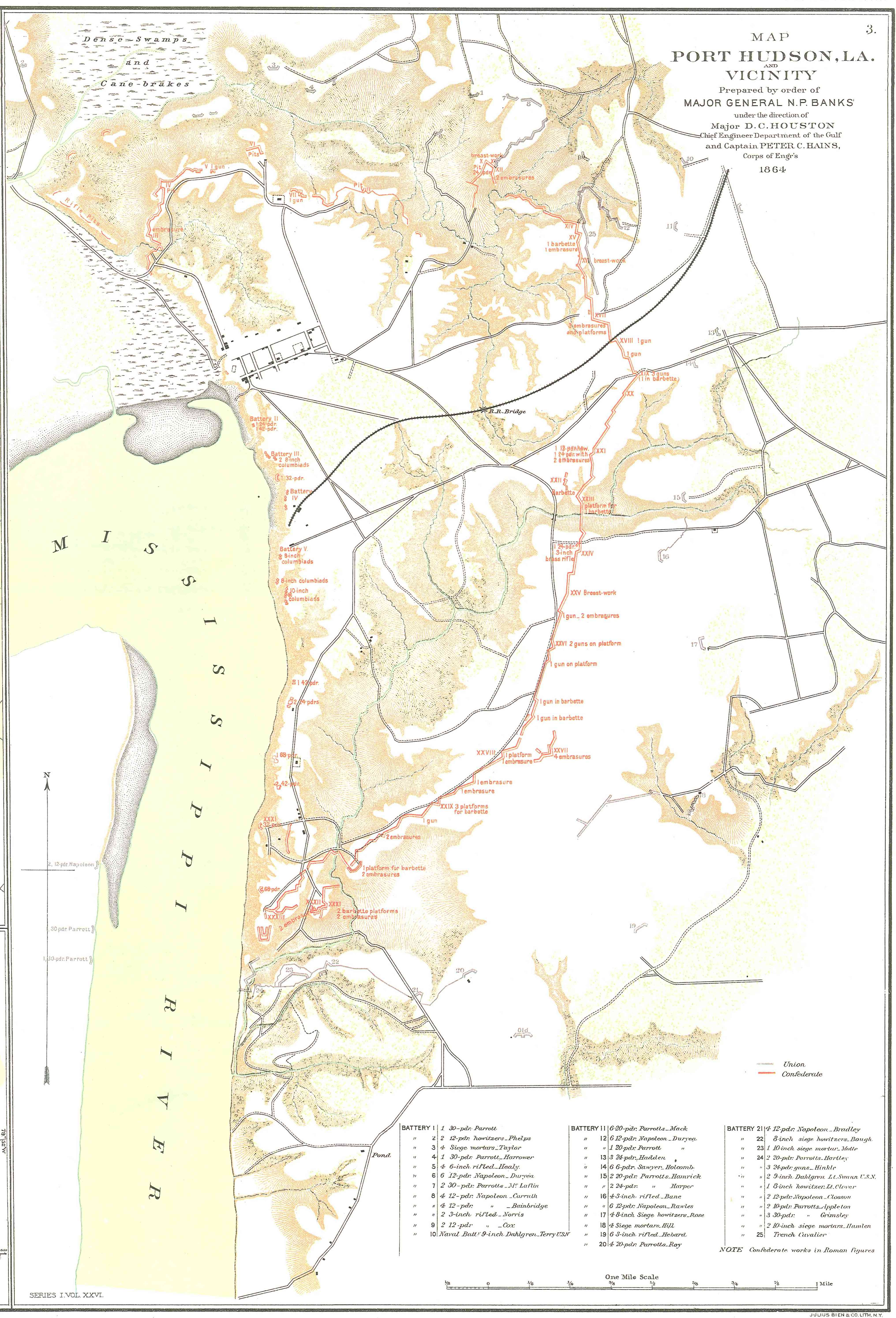
Fortifications and Battery Positions, Port Hudson, Louisiana, Department of the Gulf, 1864

General Ruggles was ordered to turn over command of Port Hudson to Brigadier General William Nelson Rector Beall on August 29, 1862, and take some of his troops to Mississippi. This was the day that the Union Navy began to contest the guns of Port Hudson for control of the Mississippi. The improvised Union gunboat USS Anglo-American, a wooden side-wheel steamboat, passed Port Hudson moving upriver to join with Commander David Dixon Porter's fleet at Vicksburg. Although struck many times by shot from Port Hudson, it was unable to return fire due to wet cartridges and an ammunition shortage. The Anglo-American joined Porter's fleet and reported the fortifications at Port Hudson.

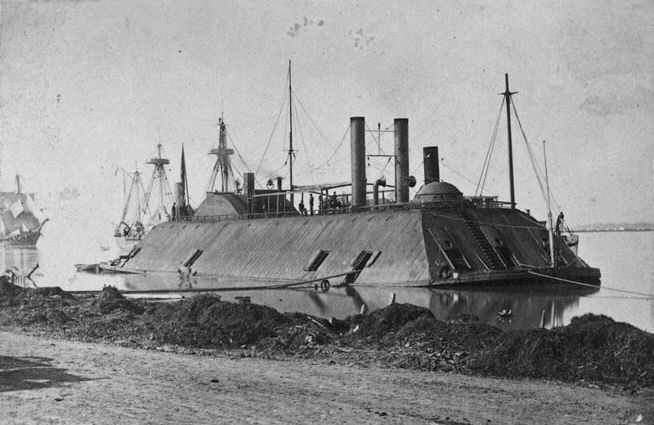
The USS Essex burst two of its guns and suffered 14 hits in a short battle with the guns of Port Hudson, September 7, 1862.

Porter responded to the new threat by bombarding the Rebel position with the USS Essex and the Anglo-American on September 7. The Union fleet did little damage to Port Hudson, but the Essex received significant damage. Porter reported 35 to 40 heavy guns at Port Hudson, a considerable exaggeration. During the lull in action when the Union delayed bringing more ships into the area, Beall slowly expanded the fortifications. This work was slowed because of interference from Union-controlled portions of the river and the inadequate rail and road system supporting his position. By this time, Confederate President Jefferson Davis realized that connecting the Port Hudson and Clinton railway to Jackson, Mississippi, would be invaluable in allowing reserves to be switched between Vicksburg and Port Hudson, depending upon which was most threatened. A desperate shortage of iron and transport within the Confederacy made such construction impossible. Beall asked Davis to impose martial law in the region of Port Hudson in order to commandeer more workers for construction, but Davis denied this also.

Beall endeavored to set up a hospital at Centenary College at Jackson Louisiana for invalided troops from Port Hudson and Clinton, but the space proved inadequate. Confederate bureaucracy had made it difficult for Garrison Provost Marshal John C. Miller to construct a logistical system of warehouses and transports to supply the garrison with food, medical supplies, barracks, bedding, and other material necessary for their health. The use of earthworks for fortification, which required unending labor to maintain and were unhealthful to live in, also contributed to the poor health of the garrison.

Poor supply lines, starvation, and disease were to remain the constant problems of the Port Hudson position, and overwhelm efforts to improve conditions for the soldiers of the garrison. Louisiana Private Robert D. Patrick wrote: "...never since I have been in the army have I fared so badly and in truth I have been almost starved." At the same time commercial activity between Port Hudson and areas west of the Mississippi increased, because Port Hudson became the sole remaining link with the Trans-Mississippi. This tended to tie up even more of Port Hudson's limited transport facilities.

=== Changes of command ===
The New Commanders
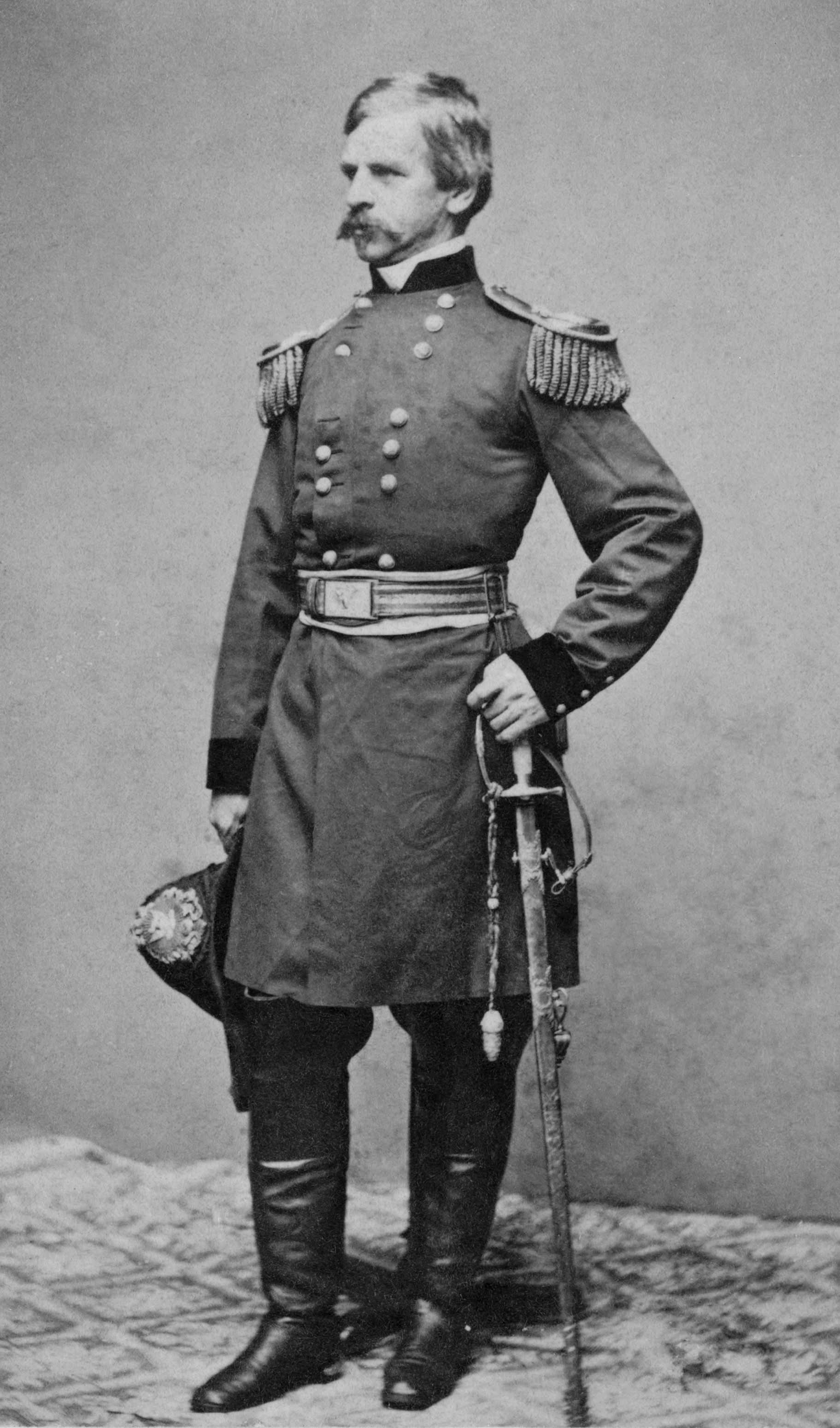
Maj. Gen.
Nathaniel P. Banks, USA

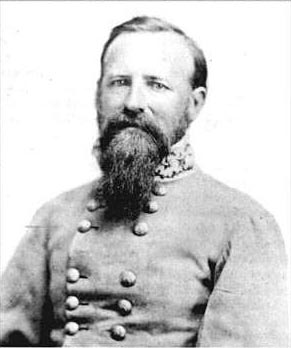
Maj. Gen.
Franklin Gardner, CSA

Lincoln's new commander of the Gulf, Nathaniel P. Banks, arrived in New Orleans on December 14, 1862, with the 31,000 men of his expedition. The former commander, Benjamin Butler left for Lowell, Massachusetts on December 24, but his 12,000 troops remained behind. This effectively more than doubled U.S. troop strength in the Gulf area. Banks ordered them to re-occupy Baton Rouge on December 17.

The Confederate command reacted to this increased Union commitment by sending a newly promoted major general to take command of Port Hudson. Major General Franklin Gardner arrived at his post on December 27, 1862. Gardner was a career Army officer who graduated from West Point 17th in his class in 1843. The native New Yorker commanded a cavalry brigade at Shiloh and was 39 years old at the time of his arrival. Upon taking command he reorganized the defenses at Port Hudson, concentrating the fields of fire of the heavy guns and rapidly setting up more earthworks by using packed earth and sod rather than the traditional gabions or sandbags.

Lacking an adequate engineering staff, he promoted Private Henry Glinder, formerly a member of the United States Coast Survey, to first lieutenant of engineers. He also increased the efficiency of the supply and storage operations, along with building protected roads within the defense system to speed the movement of troops to threatened positions. His energy in making improvements and promoting those worthy of command made him popular with his troops, and improved garrison morale. Despite the changes, Colonel Charles M. Fauntleroy, inspector-general for the department, criticized the fortifications for containing excessive numbers of civilians, badly placed magazines, poor transport and storage of grain, and no system for paying the troops on time.

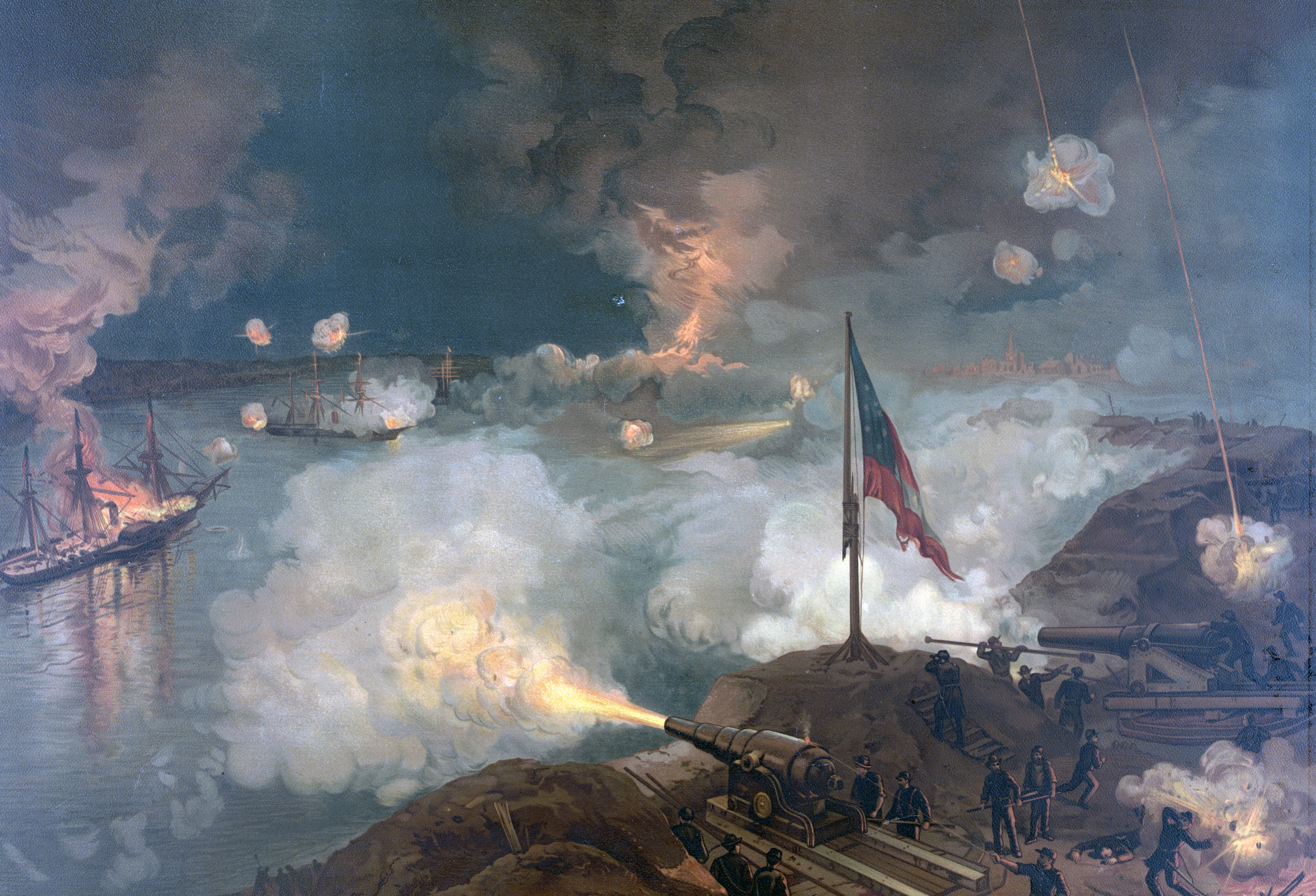
Unionist flotilla attacking Port Hudson

As Gardner strengthened his command, and gathered reinforcements from Pemberton sent by steamboat from Vicksburg, Banks dithered in New Orleans. He had little faith in the system of organization and military government left by Butler's command and spent much time re-organizing the Union administration and establishing a more relaxed civil government to placate former Confederate backers in the city. Banks was a "political general" and felt more comfortable with political organizing and social affairs than leading armies into the field against reputedly formidable fortifications. This lack of military zeal was noted by his officers. Colonel Sidney A. Bean recorded in his diary that under Butler, "much was accomplished with small means. Now nothing is accomplished with great means." The Union leader most offended by this apparent inertia was Rear Admiral David G. Farragut of the U.S. Navy. Although Banks reluctantly agreed to move against Port Hudson, his slow progress and the increased Rebel activity on the Mississippi in the area of Port Hudson caused Farragut's patience to run out. In March 1863 Farragut prepared to confront Port Hudson without Army support.

=== Farragut's fleet passes Port Hudson ===
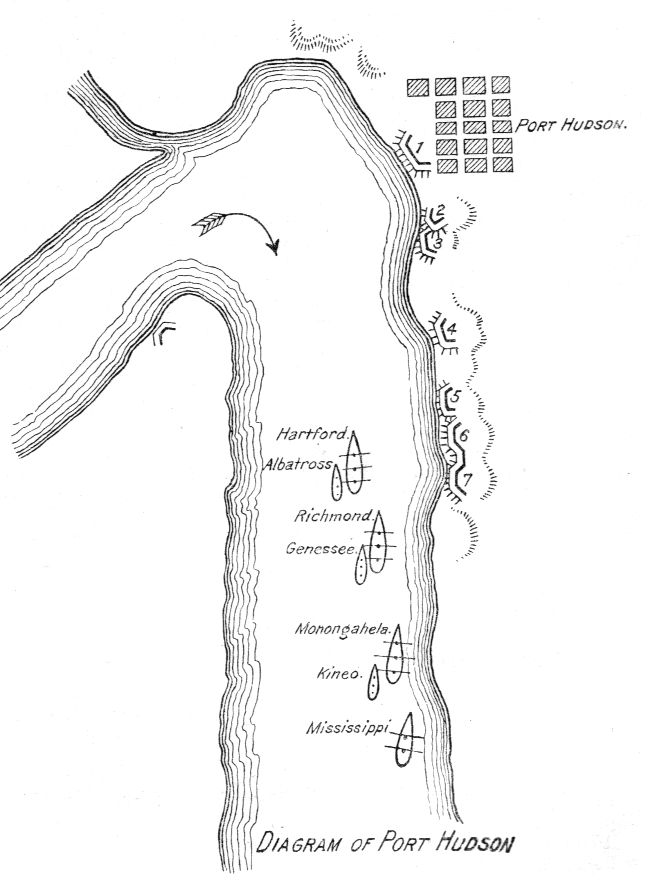
Map showing Farragut's passage of Port Hudson, March 14, 1863, 11:20 pm.

Farragut had gathered his attack force by March 13, 1863. This fleet consisted of four principal warships and three gunboats. The principal warships were the sloops-of-war USS Hartford, USS Richmond, and USS Monongahela and the steam paddle frigate USS Mississippi. The gunboats were USS Albatross, USS Genesee, and USS Kineo. Farragut commanded this fleet from his flagship, Hartford. The first six vessels were lashed together in an attack column of pairs, with Mississippi bringing up the rear by herself.

Farragut had made fairly elaborate preparations of the vessels themselves for a night attack resembling the Battle of Forts Jackson and St. Phillip, clearing the ships for action, whitewashing the gun decks to improve visibility for night action, and bringing up mortar boats for support. He also had the anchor chains of the attacking ships lashed to the sides of the attack ships as improvised armor. He did not however, make the systematic survey of defenses and sustained bombardment that supported the battle for the passage of the forts guarding New Orleans.

The Confederate fortress was ready for the attack, having noticed increased naval activity downriver, and the ranging shots of the six mortar schooners which covered the advance of the Union fleet near Prophet's Island, three miles (4.3 km) downriver from Port Hudson. At this time the Confederates had over twenty cannon covering the river arranged in eleven batteries of artillery, including nine batteries of heavy coastal artillery. Lieutenant Colonel Marshall J. Smith commanded these heavy guns, and had instructed the gun crews of his plans before the battle.

Battery Number Seven was a heated shot position, using ammunition particularly effective against wooden warships. Other preparations included preparing piles of pine wood to be ignited to illuminate the river for night action, and observation posts near the river to fire rockets to warn of the approach of enemy vessels. The first of these rockets was fired at 11:20 pm on March 14, 1863, at the approach of Farragut's fleet. Instantly an eight-inch (203-mm) smoothbore shell from Battery 9 was fired at Albatross, beginning the battle. The Union fleet advanced steadily upriver, beginning a general fire of broadsides as soon as their guns bore on the lower Confederate batteries on the Port Hudson slopes. The heavier Confederate guns, mounted over the walls of the seven lunettes on the crest of the bluffs, had difficulty aiming at the ships, which were hugging the shorelines of the bluffs in order to avoid shoals on the western shore near the curve of the river north of Port Hudson.

Coarse black powder was the artillery propellant of the period, and produced dense clouds of white smoke when fired from cannon. Combined with the smoke of the pine wood illumination fires, and the darkness of the night attack, the river valley was rapidly obscured. Blinded by the dense smoke, Hartford and Albatross ran aground on the eastern shore beneath the Rebel batteries. Despite remaining aground for ten minutes, the two lashed-together lead ships had passed the last Confederate gun position by 12:15 am and were out of range of Port Hudson by 12:45 am.

The rest of the fleet was not so lucky. Genesee and Richmond were next in the column. A trick of the wind cleared the smoke momentarily between the batteries and the ships, and Richmond was hammered by Rebel shot and shell. Just as Richmond made the turn in the river north of Port Hudson, a 6.4-inch (163 mm) solid conical shot tore through the starboard side, smashing both port and starboard boiler safety valves. This cut power to the engines and filled the ship with clouds of escaping steam. Genesee alone did not have enough power to stem the current, and both ships drifted back downriver.

Monongahela and Kineo were next in the column, and, also blinded by smoke, ran aground on the western shore. The impact separated the two ships. The stress of backing off the shore disabled Monongahela's engine, and a thirty-two-pounder (14.5 kg) round shot split Kineo's rudder post, disabling her steering. Both ships drifted downriver.

Mississippi was last in line and also ran aground on the western shore. The large steam paddle frigate was an irresistible target, and was riddled with shot, shell, and hot shot. The vessel being afire in many places, with flames endangering the magazine, Captain Smith ordered her abandoned. The garrison of Port Hudson cheered loudly as the ship went up in flames and drifted loose from the shore and back downriver at about 3 am, panicking the remainder of the Union fleet downriver at the threat of her magazine exploding. At 5:05 am Mississippi disappeared in a terrific explosion, seen in New Orleans nearly 80 miles (129 km.) downriver.

Though Hartford and Albatross passed upriver to blockade the Red River, General Gardner and the Port Hudson garrison regarded the battle as a victory. They had sustained only three enlisted men killed and three officers and nineteen men wounded, compared to the seventy-eight killed or missing and thirty-five wounded on the Union fleet. The blockade of the Red River also had little effect on the strength of the Port Hudson position.

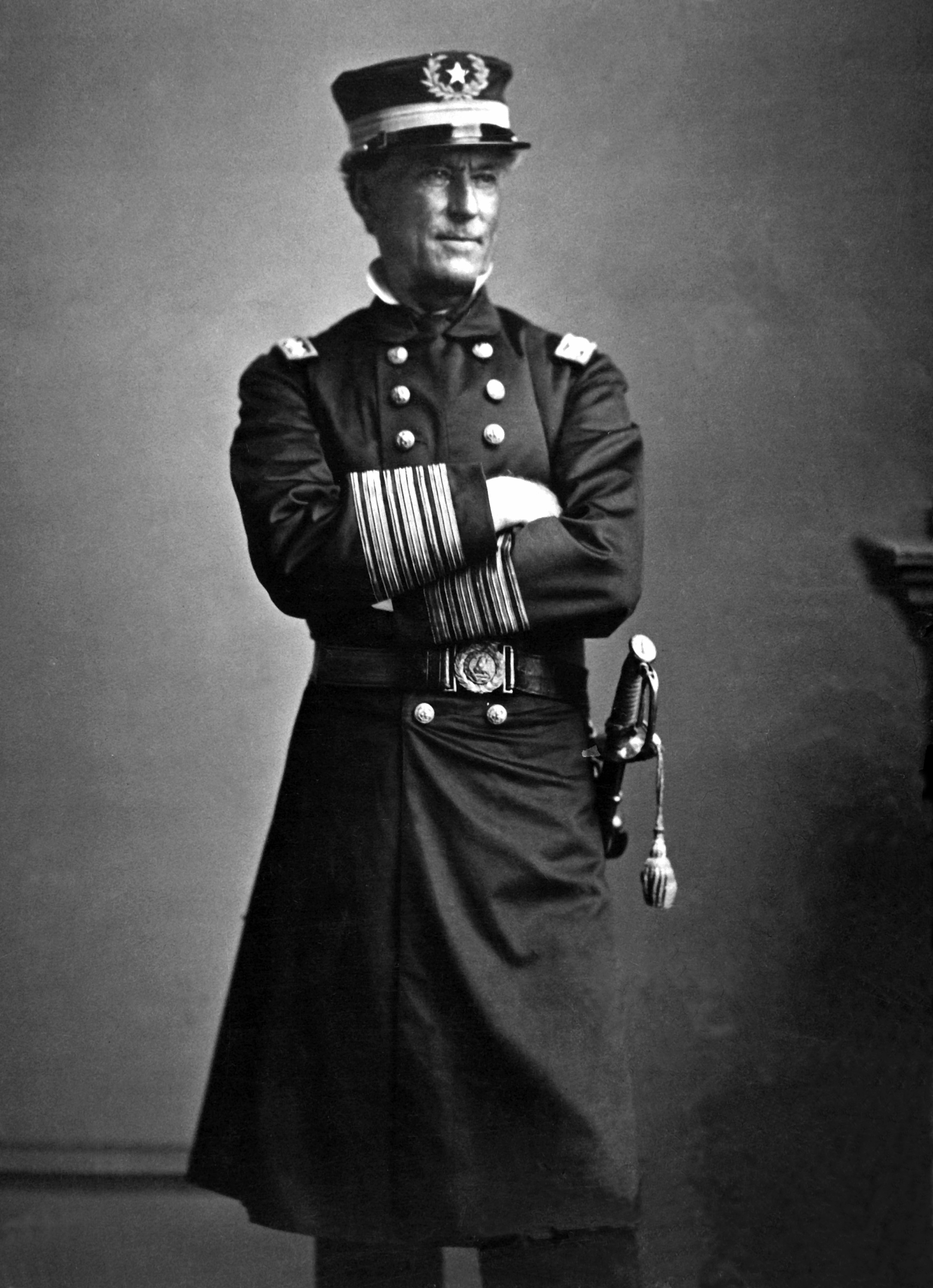
Rear Admiral David G. Farragut

Contemporary Newspaper view of the Union fleet passing Port Hudson published by Harper's Weekly Newspaper April 18, 1863.

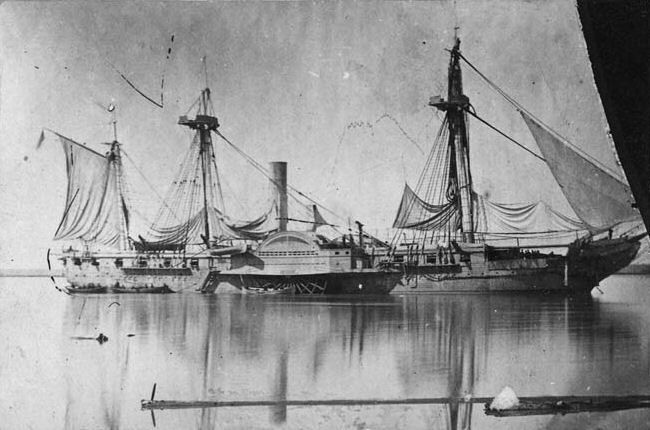
The USS Mississippi was completely destroyed by the guns of Port Hudson. Lieutenant George Dewey, later to become an admiral, survived the wreck.

=== Banks's army moves against the fortress ===
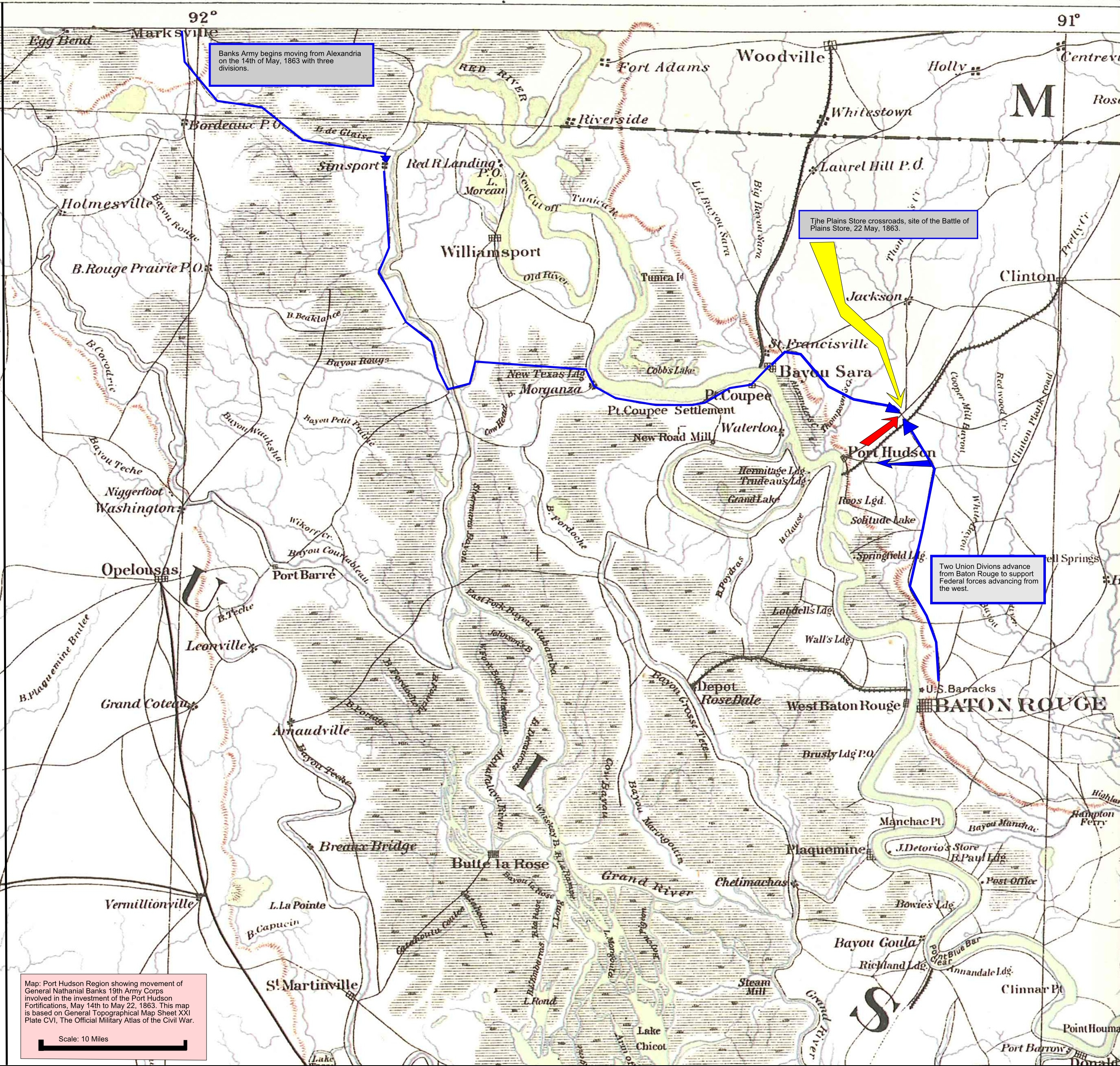
Topographical Map Sheet XXI, edited to show the advance of Banks forces to invest Port Hudson, May 14 to 22, 1863. Correction, Info box in lower left map should also read Plate CLVI rather than CVI.

After the naval attack, Banks retreated the 17,000 troops he had intended as a diversion to support Farragut back to Baton Rouge. The lack of an attack against Port Hudson, and a powerful rainstorm endured on the retreat lowered morale in the Union force. Other than sporadic naval bombardments against Port Hudson, Banks, under pressure from Washington to show progress, launched a campaign against Major General Taylor's Confederate forces in western Louisiana and gained control of Alexandria and a foothold on the Red River. What finally brought him to leading an attack directly against Port Hudson was the prospect of reinforcements from Grant's army arrayed against Vicksburg, and word that a significant part of the Port Hudson garrison had been sent to Pemberton in Vicksburg.

On May 11, 1863, the 3rd Louisiana Native Guards, one of Butler's black regiments, began building bridges to support the movement of Banks's forces against Port Hudson. Leading the advance was the cavalry brigade of Colonel Benjamin Henry Grierson, which had joined Banks's forces on May 2 after their famous raid through the Rebel lines. The entire advance involved a pincer movement with three army divisions advancing from the northwest from Bayou Sara meeting two divisions advancing from the south from Baton Rouge. The meeting of the two groups would surround Port Hudson.

One of Banks's lead divisions from Baton Rouge encountered Confederates on May 21 at the Battle of Plains Store. The Confederates were driven back, and by May 22, Banks's forces, which increased in strength from 30,000 to 40,000 men as the operation progressed, had completed an investment of the Port Hudson defenses. Banks hoped to overrun the entrenchments quickly, then take his army northward to assist Grant at Vicksburg.

== The fighting and siege ==
=== The first infantry assault ===
Sieges and the assault of fortified positions are probably the most complex and demanding of military operations. The foremost authority on these matters at the time of the civil war was still the seventeenth century French engineer, the Marquis de Vauban, who designed many European fortification systems, and organized many successful sieges. The Confederate earthworks of Port Hudson, and their use of artillery lunettes show his influence.

General Gardner reinforced the picket lines shielding the Confederate grain mill and support shops of the areas near Little Sandy Creek, previously left unfortified because he had not considered a siege probable. Other Confederate troops remained outside the fortifications, consisting of 1200 troops under the command of Colonel John L. Logan. These represented all of Gardner's cavalry, the 9th Louisiana Battalion, Partisan Rangers, and two artillery pieces of Robert's battery. These troops slowed the encirclement of Banks troops, and prevented them from discovering the weaknesses in the defenses. Due to these delays, the infantry assault was scheduled for May 27, 1863, five days after the encirclement and time enough for Gardner to complete the ring of defenses around Port Hudson. He also had sufficient time to move artillery from the river side of the fort to the east side fronting the Federal forces.

=== Weitzel's morning attacks, May 27th ===
Sketch map of the northern area of the Port Hudson fortifications and Weitzel's morning attack, May 27, 1863.

Banks had set up his headquarters at Riley's plantation and planned the attacks with his staff and division commanders. Many were opposed to the idea of trying to overwhelm the fort with a simple assault, but Banks wanted to end the siege as quickly as possible in order to support Grant, and felt that the 30,000 troops available to him would easily force the surrender of the 7,500 troops under Gardner, a four to one advantage. Four different assault groups were organized, under the commands of generals Godfrey Weitzel, Cuvier Grover, Christopher C. Augur, and Thomas W. Sherman (often mistakenly identified as a relative of General William Tecumseh Sherman). Banks did not choose a specific time for his intended simultaneous assault however, ordering his commanders to "...commence at the earliest hour practicable."

The effect of this was to break up the attack, with generals Weitzel and Grover attacking on the north and northeast sides of the fort at dawn, and generals Augur and Sherman attacking on the east and southeast sides at noon. The naval bombardment began the night before the attack, the 13" (330 mm) mortars firing most of the evening, and the upper and lower fleets beginning firing for an hour after 7 am. The army land batteries also fired an hour bombardment after 5:30 am. Weitzel's two divisions began the attack at 6 am on the north, advancing through the densely forested ravines bordering the valley of Little Sandy Creek. This valley led the assault into a salient formed by a fortified ridge known as the "bull pen" where the defenders slaughtered cattle, and a lunette on a ridge nicknamed "Fort Desperate" which had been hastily improvised to protect the fort's grain mill.

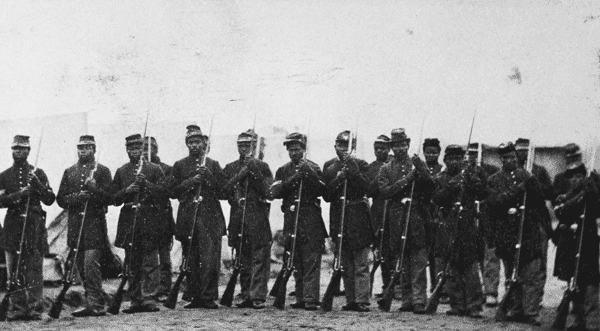
Soldiers of the Native Guard Regiments at Port Hudson. This squad is in the "Parade Rest" position.

At the end of this ravine between the two was a hill described as "commissary hill" with an artillery battery mounted on it. The Union troops were caught in a crossfire from these three positions, and held in place by dense vegetation and obstacles placed by rebel troops that halted their advance. The combination of rugged terrain, a crossfire from three sides, and rebel sharpshooters inflicted many casualties. The Union troops advancing west of the bull pen were made up of Fearing's brigade. These soldiers were caught between the bull pen, which had been reinforced with the 14th, 18th, and 23rd Arkansas regiments from the east side of Port Hudson, and a more western fortified ridge manned by Lieutenant Colonel M. B. Locke's Alabama troops. Once again the combination of steep sided ravines, dense vegetation, and a rebel crossfire from ridge top trenches halted the Union advance. Premature shell bursts from the supporting artillery of the 1st Maine Battery also caused Union casualties.

Seeing that his advance had been stopped, Brigadier General William Dwight ordered the 1st and 3rd Louisiana Native Guard forward into the attack. These troops were not intended to take part in the attack due to the general prejudice against African-American troops on the part of the Union high command. Dwight was determined to break through the Confederate fortifications however, and committed them to the attack at 10 am. Since they had been deployed as pioneers, working on the pontoon bridge over Big Sandy Creek near its junction with the Mississippi, these troops were in the worst possible position for an attack of all the units in Weitzel's northern assault group.

The Guard first had to advance over the pontoon bridge, along Telegraph Road with a fortified ridge to their left manned by William B. Shelby's 39th Mississippi troops supported by a light artillery battery, the Confederate heavy artillery batteries to their front, and the Mississippi river to their immediate right. Despite the heavy crossfire from rifles, field artillery, and heavy coast guns, the Louisiana Native Guards advanced with determination and courage, led by Captain Andre Cailloux, a free black citizen of New Orleans. Giving orders in English and French, Cailloux led the Guard regiments forward until killed by artillery fire. Taking heavy losses, the attackers were forced to retreat to avoid annihilation. This fearless advance did much to dissipate the belief that black troops were unreliable under fire.

In an attempt to support Weitzel's unsuccessful assault, Brigadier Grover, commanding the northeast attack on the fortress, sent two of his regiments along the road leading northeast from Commissary Hill to assault Fort Desperate. This group had no more success than Weitzel's troops, so Grover sent three more regiments to attack the stubborn 15th Arkansas troops defending the fort. These piecemeal and sporadic efforts were also futile, and the fighting ended on the northern edge of the fortress by noon.

=== Sherman's afternoon attacks, May 27th ===
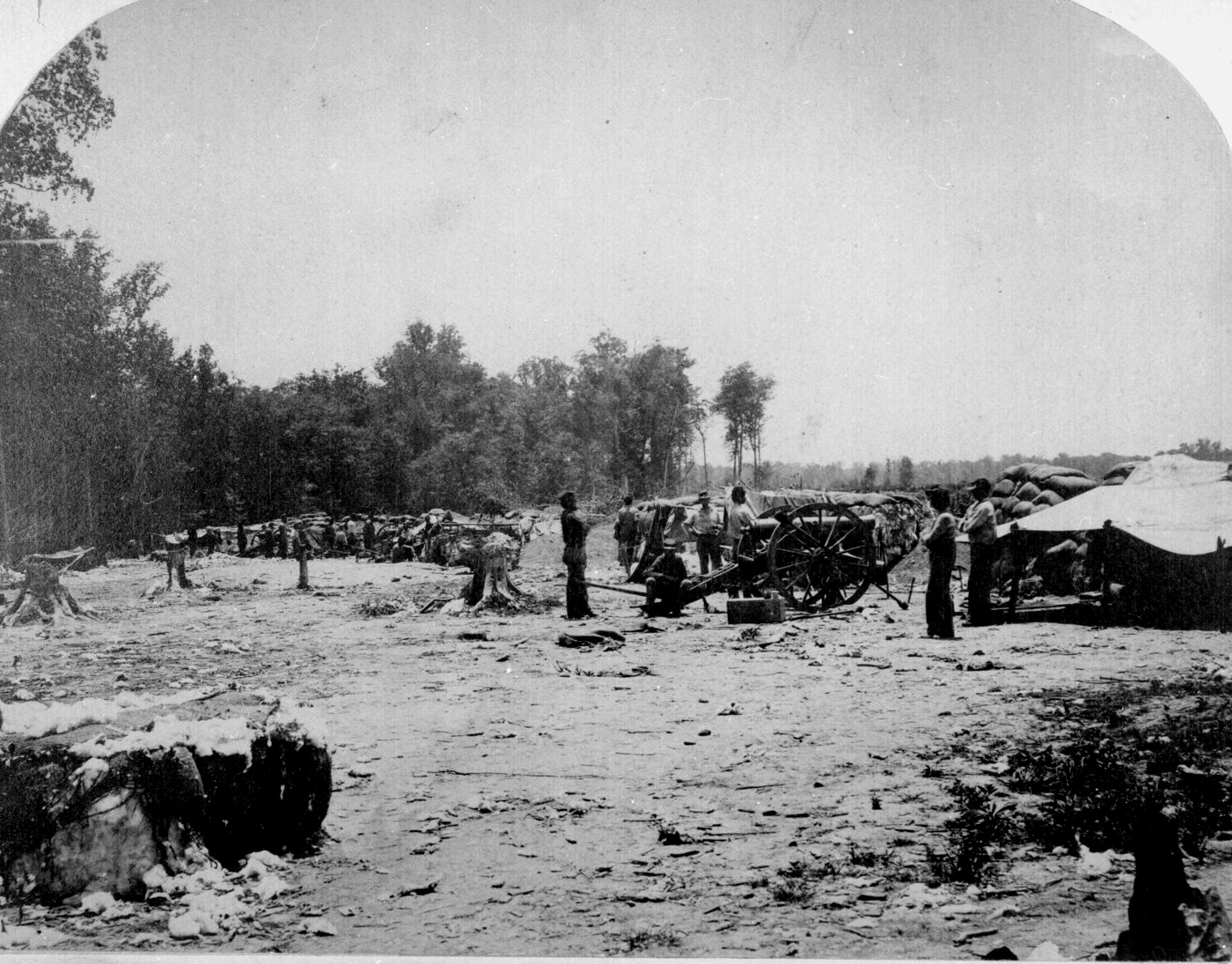
Capt. Edmund C. Bainbridge's Battery A, 1st U.S. Artillery, at the siege of Port Hudson, Louisiana, 1863.

Sketch map of the eastern Port Hudson Fortifications and Sherman's afternoon attack, May 27, 1863.

While the infantry attacks raged against the northern section of the fortress, Brigadier General Sherman lined up 30 cannon opposite the eastern side of the fortress and conducted a steady bombardment of the rebel works and battery positions, supported by sharpshooters aiming for Confederate artillery crews. This effort had some success, but General Banks, upon hearing no rifle fire from the Union center, visited Sherman's headquarters and threatened to relieve him of command unless he advanced his troops. Sherman then began the attack on the eastern edge of the Port Hudson works at about 2 pm.

These attacks included the troops of Augur as well as his own, and had less in the way of natural terrain obstacles to contend with, but in this area the Confederates had more time to construct fortifications, and had put more effort and firepower into them. One feature of the earthworks in this region was a dry moat and more abatis or cut down trees in front of the parapet. The Union attackers therefore carried axes, poles, planks, cotton bags and fascines to fill in the ditch. Another feature of the rebel defense was a battery containing two 24-pounder smoothbore (5.82-inch, 148 mm bore) as canister throwers.

In this case the canister was composed of broken chains, segments of railroad rails, and other scrap iron. Confederate Colonel William R. Miles, commanding the infantry in the sector, had also removed all the rifles from the hospital that had been left by the sick and wounded. He was thus able to equip each of his soldiers with three weapons, greatly increasing their firepower. When the Union infantry closed within 200 yards they were met by a hail of rifle and canister fire, and few made it within 70 yards of the Confederate lines. Union commanders Sherman and Dow were wounded in these attacks, and Lieutenant Colonel James O'Brien, commanding the pioneer group, was killed. At 5 pm the commander of the 159th New York raised a white flag to signal a truce to remove the wounded and dead from the field. This ended the fighting for the day. None of the Union attacks had even made it to the Confederate parapets. The Union suffered 293 KIA, 1,545 wounded, 157 MIA, compared to the Confederate casualties of 235.

=== Last Federal Assault, June 14th ===
Sketch map of the Port Hudson Fortifications and Grover's night attack, June 14, 1863, 3:30 pm

The successful defense of their lines brought a renewed confidence to Gardner and his garrison. They felt though a combination of well planned defensive earthworks and the skillful and deliberate reinforcement of threatened areas, the superior numbers of attackers had been repulsed. Learning from his experience, Gardner organized a more methodical system of defense. This involved dividing the fortifications into a network of defense zones, with an engineering officer in charge of strengthening the defense in each area. For the most part this involved once again charting the best cross fire for artillery positions, improving firepower concentrations, and digging protective pits to house artillery when not in use, to protect them from enemy bombardment.

Spent bullets and scrap metal were sewed into shirtsleeves to make up canister casings for the artillery, and the heavy coast guns facing the river that had center pivot mounts were cleared for firing on Union positions on the eastern side of the fortress. Three of these guns were equipped for this, and one 10-inch (250 mm) columbiad in Battery Four was so effective in this that Union troops referred to it as the "Demoralizer". Its fearful reputation spawned the myth that it was mounted on a railroad car, and could fire from any position in the fortifications. Captain L. J. Girard was placed in charge of the function of the artillery, and despite material shortages, achieved miracles in keeping the artillery functional. Rifles captured from the enemy or taken from hospitalized soldiers were stacked for use by troops in the trench lines.

Positions in front of the lines were land mined with unexploded 13-inch (330 mm) mortar shells, known as "torpedoes" at the time. Sniper positions were also prepared at high points in the trench works for sharpshooters. These methods improved the defense, but could not make up for the fact that the garrison was short of everything except gunpowder. The food shortage was a drag on morale, and resulted in a significant level of desertion to the enemy. This drain on manpower was recorded by Colonel Steedman, who wrote "Our most serious and annoying difficulty is the unreliable character of a portion of our Louisiana troops. Many have deserted to the enemy, giving him information of our real condition; yet in the same regiments we have some of our ablest officers and men." Miles' Louisiana Legion were considered the greatest offenders.

On the Union side, astonishment and chagrin were near universal in reaction to the decisive defeat of the infantry assaults. Banks was determined to continue the siege as his political as well as military career would be destroyed by a withdrawal to Baton Rouge. The resources of his entire command were called into play, and men and material poured into the Union encirclement. Nine additional regiments appeared in the lines by June 1. 89 field guns were brought into action, and naval guns from USS Richmond were added to the siege guns bearing on the fortress. These six naval guns were 9-inch (229 mm) Dahlgren smoothbores. The guns were originally intended for a battery at the Head of Passes in the Mississippi Delta. The fact that four were finally emplaced in Battery Number 10, just east of "Fort Desperate" and two in Number 24, gives some idea of the reach and progress of the Union Navy. Each of the Dahlgren guns weighed 9,020 pounds and was 9 feet long, capable of firing a 73.5 pound (33.3 kg) exploding shell.

The second assault began with sustained shelling of the Confederate works, beginning at 11:15 am on 13 June 1863, and lasting an hour. Banks then sent a message to Gardner demanding the surrender of his position. Gardner replied "My duty requires me to defend this position, and therefore I decline to surrender." Banks continued the bombardment for the night, but only gave the order for what was to be a simultaneous three-prong infantry attack at 1 am on 14 June. The attack finally began at 3:30 am, but the lack of any agreed upon plan and a heavy fog disordered the attack as it began. Grover's column struck the Confederate line at "Fort Desperate" before the others, and the same formidable terrain combined with the enhanced Confederate defense stopped the attacks outside the rebel works. Auger's demonstration at the center arrived after the main attack had failed, and the attack on the southern end of the line was made after daylight, and stood little chance as a result. The infantry attack had only resulted in even more dead and wounded soldiers: 1,792 Union casualties, against 47 Confederate. Division commander Brig. Gen. Halbert E. Paine led the main attack and fell wounded, losing a leg. After this, the actions against Port Hudson were reduced to bombardment and siege.

Shortly after the war, Capt. James F. Fitts of the 114th New York described the 14 June assault on in The Galaxy magazine:

...while every eye was bent anxiously forward to catch the first view of the position. It was no time for the exhibition of enthusiasm; nobody failed to understand that the assault was being furiously pressed, without an inch of advantage to us thus far. I looked at the faces of those about me, and saw that they perfectly understood it. There were some boyish faces there that were quite pale, and the bearded ones wore a look which was almost one of suffering; but one and all were silently nerving their hearts for the torment, and they kept right on…
The sound of the strife rolled down from above in an increasing tumult; the bullets fell thicker into the road; the air was mingled with noises of battle. The sides of the cut began to slope toward the level of our feet; two rods more, and we were out of the covered way. There was an abrupt ascent, then a small area of rough, uneven ground, then a ditch, seven feet deep, and quite as wide, while beyond all rose a perpendicular earthwork, not less than twelve feet above the ditch, built in the form of a retreating angle. Here was the point chosen for the assault, and before it was being enacted a scene of slaughter replete with all the horrors of a close and desperate fight. There was not sufficient ground to allow a regiment to deploy to advantage; as fast as they were unmasked from the cut, the companies rushed with a shout up the ascent, across the intervening ground, and into the ditch. From the parapet of the Rebel work came a continual flash of rifles–not in volleys, but in an irregular burst which never ceased while the attack lasted. The Rebels were entirely sheltered behind their defenses; hardly a head was to be seen above the parapet. The open space before the work was strewn with soldiers in blue, dead, dying, and severely wounded; they lay among the bushes, on the hillside, and covered the bottom of that awful ditch, yawning like a grave, at the foot of the work. For a whole hour there was a continued repetition of the scene; a yell, a rush, shouts, musket shots, cries and groans. The ditch was at last filled with the living and the dead; the former striving, within six yards of the muzzles of the Rebel rifles, to climb the face of the earthwork, and continually dropping back, with bullet holes perforated clear through their bodies…Wounded men were killed while trying to crawl beyond the range of the fire, or lay helpless under it, unable to hazard the attempt…every repetition of the assault was met by the same murderous discharge, covering the ground thickly with its victims, and adding to the horrors of the scene.

— Capt. James F. Fitts of the 114th New York

Six of these mortar schooners armed with the 13-inch (330 mm) seacoast mortar supported the Union attack with indirect fire from an anchorage near Prophet's Island, downriver from Port Hudson. (U.S. Army Military History Institute.)

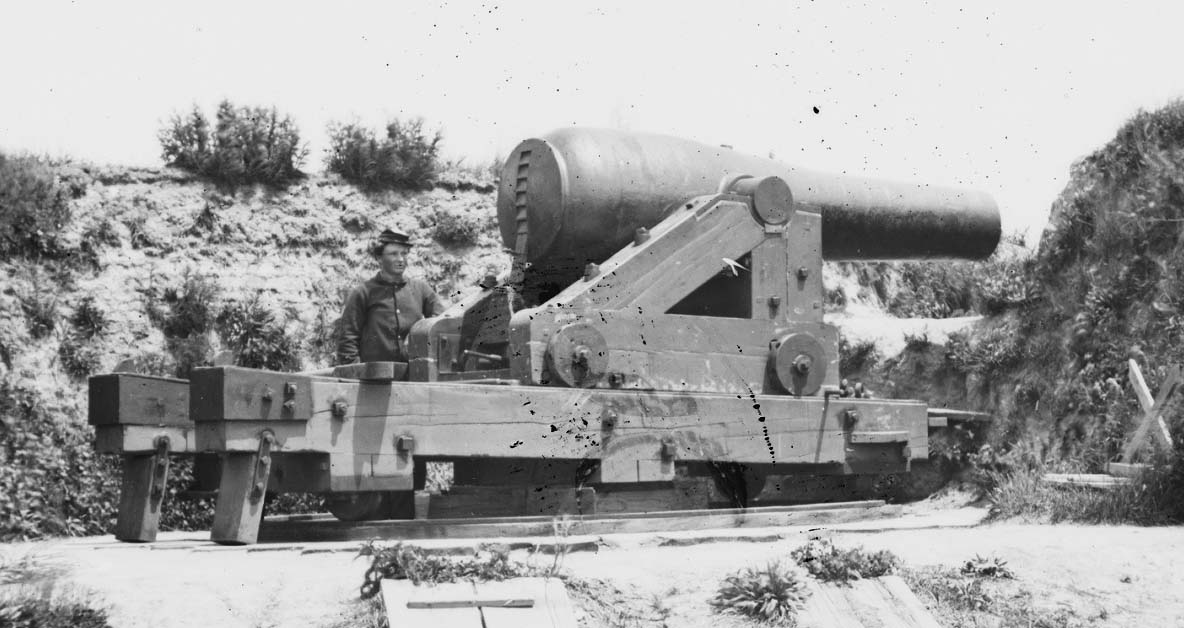
A Confederate 10-inch (254 mm) Rodman columbiad on a center pivot mount, similar to the "Demoralizer" in Battery Four at Port Hudson

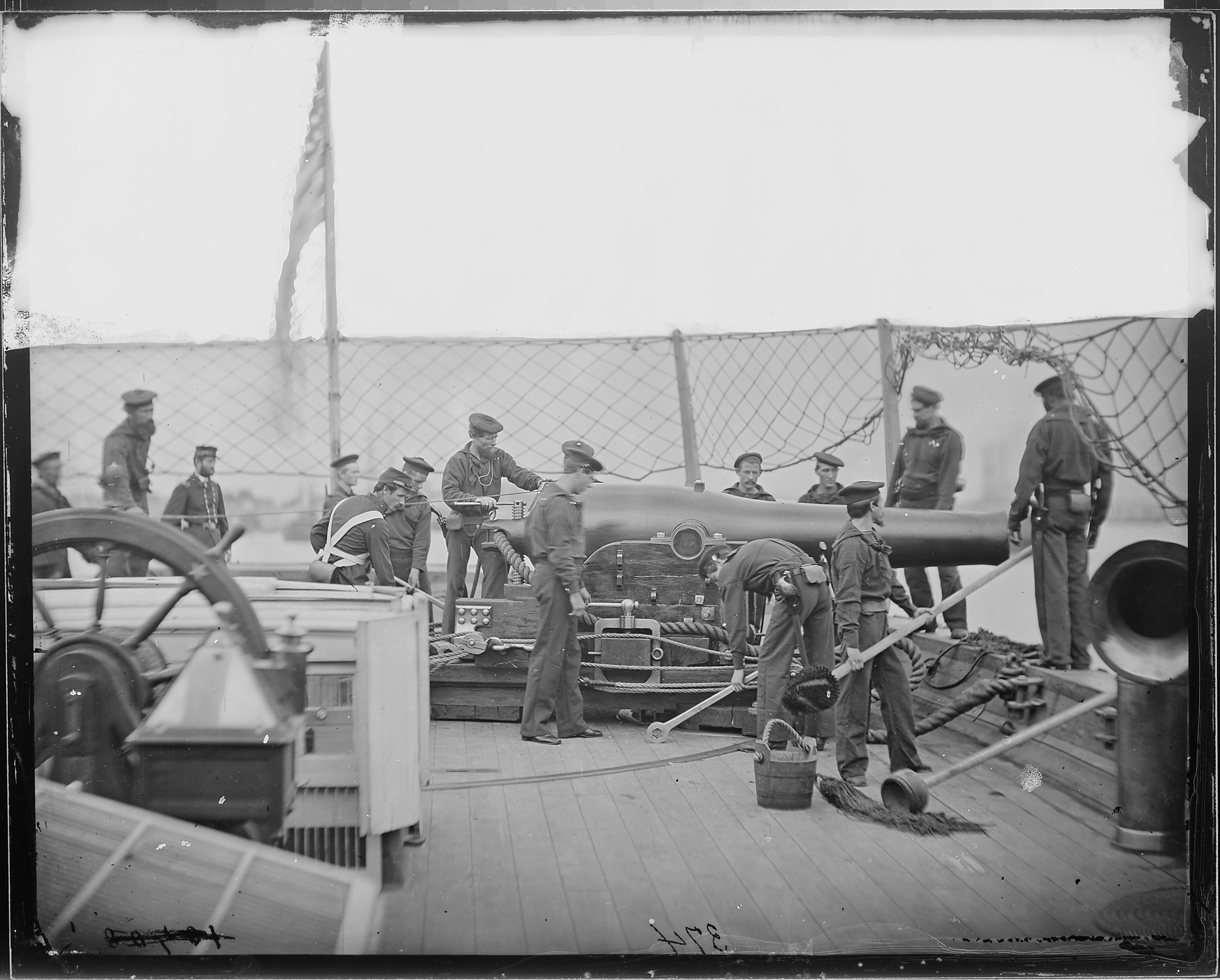
The Yankee answer: A four-gun battery of Dahlgren 9-inch (229 mm) navy smoothbores from USS Richmond set up just east of "Fort Desperate" in battery ten (see Fortifications and Batteries map) (National Archives).

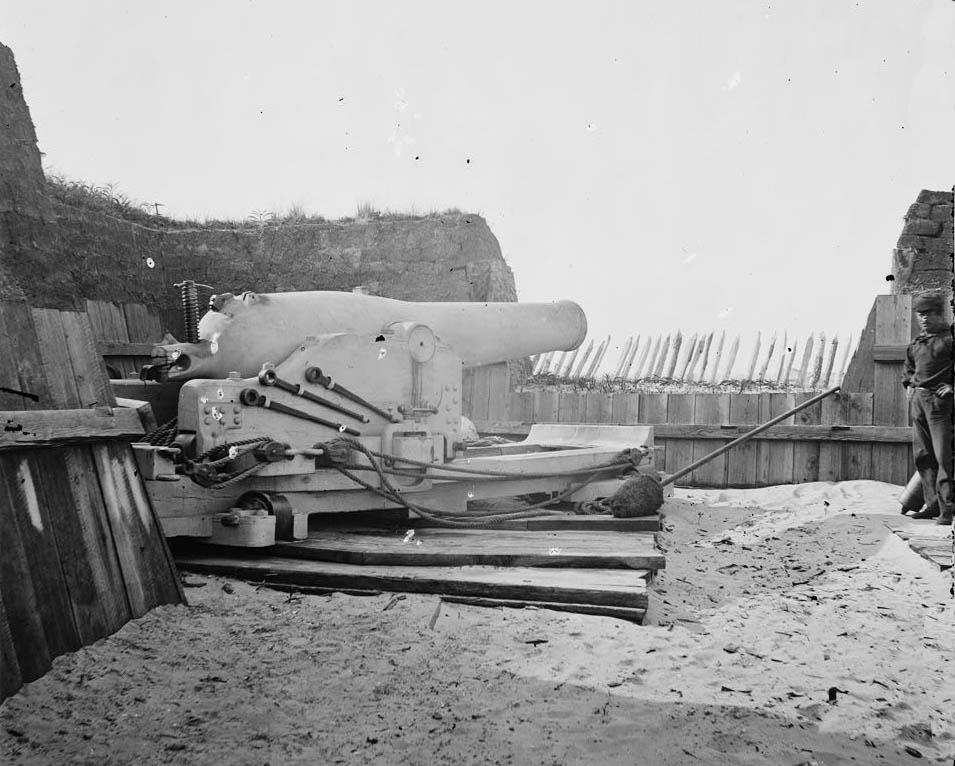
A nine-inch (229 mm) Union navy Dahlgren gun set up on land for siege work as they were at battery ten at Port Hudson. The gun is whitewashed so it can be more easily worked at night. The projections at the breech are for the navy double vent percussion firing system. The crewman at the far right is wearing the Union navy uniform.

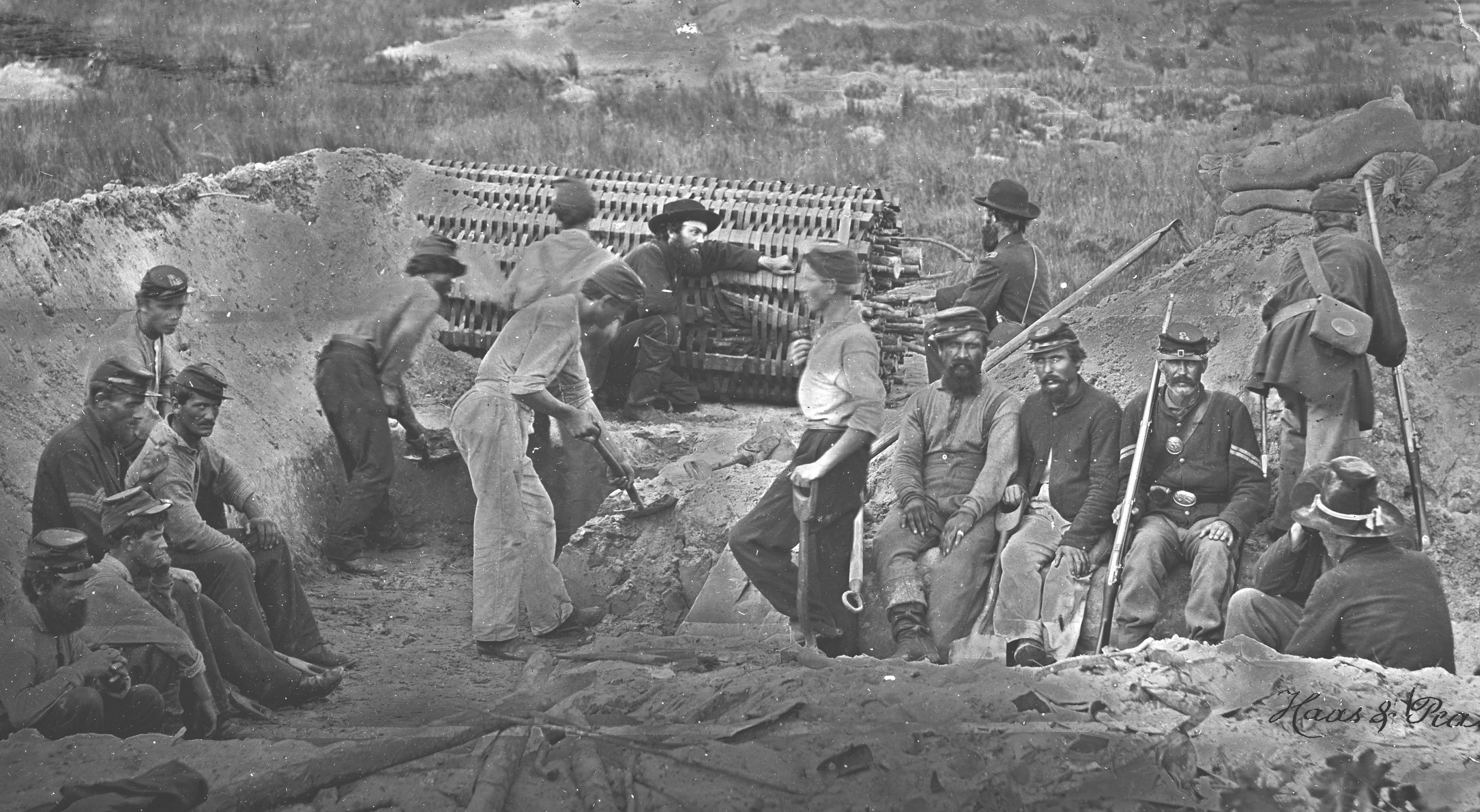
A Union sapper or combat engineer group digs a trench in the direction of an enemy fortification. A gabion provides cover from enemy fire. At Port Hudson a sugar hogshead stuffed with cotton or a cotton bale would serve the same purpose.

=== Last stages of the siege, June 15 to July 9, 1863 ===
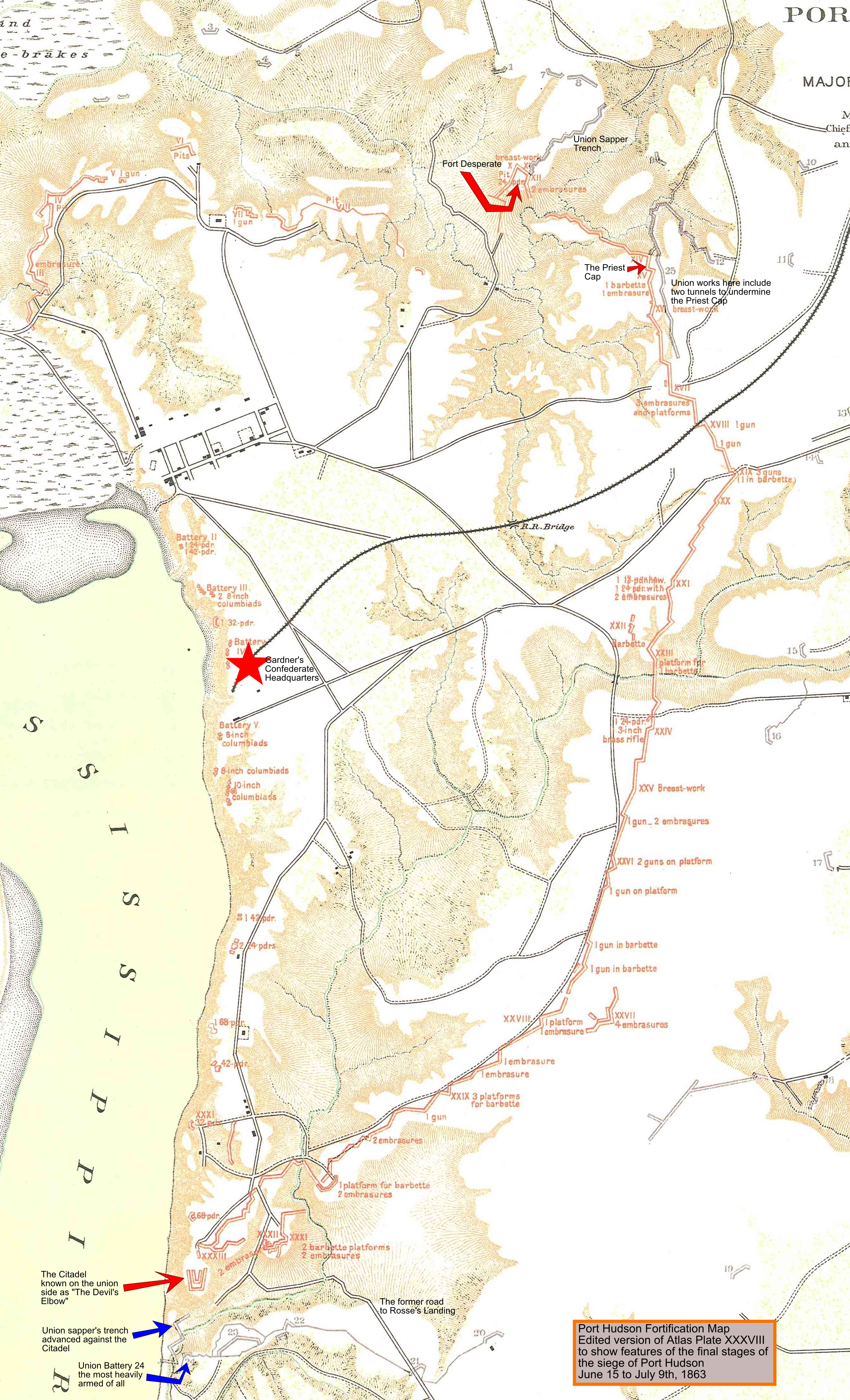
An edited version of the Port Hudson fortification map to highlight the final stages of the siege

The day after the last infantry assault, General Banks assembled some of his troops at the corps headquarters and thanked them for their previous efforts and sacrifices. He also asked for volunteers for a special attack group to be trained intensively to breach the Confederate trench line. His speech generated little enthusiasm, but a unit of 1036 men was formed and removed to a training camp in the rear to prepare for the attack. There they assembled siege ladders and organized into two battalions, commanded by Lieutenant Colonel John B. Van Petten and Lieutenant Colonel A. S. Bickmore. Colonel Henry Warner Birge of the 13th Connecticut Infantry volunteered to lead the special assault regiment.

Regular siege operations were also reorganized under the command of a new chief engineer, Captain John C. Palfrey. He concentrated the efforts of the siege on three areas of the fortifications, Fort Desperate, the Priest Cap (Confederate batteries 14 & 15), and the Citadel, the southernmost bastion of the fortifications, nicknamed by Union forces as "the Devil's Elbow". These efforts did not involve infantry rushing the trenches, but a siege technique called sapping, or constructing a series of zigzag trenches, fortified batteries, and sharpshooter positions intended to isolate and suppress individual defensive bastions. The sharpshooter or sniper positions were described at the time as trench cavaliers and were raised mounds of earth, reinforced with timbers or other materials to allow riflemen to overlook the enemy trenches and fire down into them.

The Citadel was to be reduced by a powerful siege battery constructed on a hill just to the south, Union battery number 24, intended to suppress the Confederate position by superior firepower. Union batteries were also constructed on the west bank of the Mississippi opposite Port Hudson, completely surrounding it with Union artillery batteries. Union forces also made raids on opposing trenches and batteries, to enhance their own trench lines or disable enemy batteries. Some of the 6th Michigan Infantry Regiment troops opposite the Citadel were armed with the .54 caliber (14 mm) breech-loading Merrill carbine, which gave them a rapid fire edge in trench raids. On June 26, a general bombardment from Union batteries and guns of the Union fleet began, disabling or suppressing what remained of the Confederate artillery. Along with the trenching operations, the Federals also constructed three mines underneath the opposing works, two of them directed against the Priest Cap, and one under the Citadel. After the mines were finished, chambers at the end of the mines would be loaded with powder, and exploded under the Confederate works, destroying them, and blowing gaps in the trench lines. At this point an infantry assault would be launched, hopefully overrunning the entire fortification.

The Confederates responded to the siege techniques with increased efforts of their own. The grist mill at Fort Desperate had been destroyed by shelling. It was replaced by using the locomotive from the defunct railroad to power millstones, providing a steady supply of cornmeal for the garrison. Expended rifle and artillery shells were salvaged for reuse by the defense, small arms shot being recast for making new cartridges, artillery rounds reused and distributed to Confederate artillery of the same caliber, or reused as mines and grenades. Additional trench lines, obstacles, mines, and bunkers were added to the threatened bastions, making them more difficult to bombard, infiltrate, or overrun. The Priest Cap bastion had a particularly elaborate defense system, including the use of telegraph wire staked up to a height of 18 inches (460 mm), in order to trip attacking infantry. Additional field artillery and infantry were added to the defense of Fort Desperate, making sapping in that area more costly.

Various raids against Union saps were also conducted. On June 26, the Confederates launched a trench raid by the 16th Arkansas Infantry against the Priest Cap sap, taking seven prisoners, and capturing weapons and supplies. Rebel trench raiders and defenders were adept at constructing and using improvised hand grenades. Raids by Logan's cavalry were also made against Union positions outside the siege lines. On June 3 an advance by Grierson's Union cavalry against Logan's position at Clinton was repulsed. The 14th New York Cavalry was hit on June 15 near Newport, two miles from Port Hudson. Other raids struck Union foraging parties returning from Jackson, Louisiana, and captured the Union General Neal Dow, who was convalescing at Heath plantation. The biggest raid set fire to the Union supply center at Springfield Landing on July 2. These raids were annoying to Banks, but could not break the siege. On July 3, a countermine was exploded near one of the Federal mines under the Priests Cap. This collapsed the mine, but surprisingly did not cause any Union casualties. The defenders could not compensate for the constant losses of personnel resulting from starvation, disease, particularly scurvy, dysentery, and malaria, sniping, shell fragments, sunstroke and desertion. The use of mule meat and rats as rations could not maintain the health of the soldiers left standing, and was a further drain on morale.

The siege created hardships and deprivations for both the North and South, but by early July the Confederates were in much worse shape. They had exhausted practically all of their food supplies and ammunition, and fighting and disease had greatly reduced the number of men able to defend the trenches. When Maj. Gen. Gardner learned that Vicksburg had surrendered on July 4, 1863, he realized that his situation was hopeless and that nothing could be gained by continuing. The terms of surrender were negotiated, and on July 9, 1863, the Confederates laid down their weapons, ending 48 days of continuous fighting. It had been the longest siege in US military history.

Captain Thornton A. Jenkins accepted the Confederate surrender, as Admiral David Farragut was in New Orleans.

== Aftermath ==
The surrender and that of Vicksburg gave the Union complete control of the Mississippi River and its major tributaries, severing communications and trade between the eastern and western states of the Confederacy.

Both sides had suffered heavy casualties: between 4,700 and 5,200 Union men were casualties, and an additional 4,000 fell prey to disease or sunstroke; Gardner's forces suffered around 900 casualties, from battle losses and disease. Banks granted lenient terms to the Port Hudson garrison. The enlisted men were paroled to their homes, with transport for the sick and lightly wounded. Seriously sick or wounded were placed under Union medical care. 5,935 men and civilian employees of the Confederate Army were officially paroled. 405 officers were not paroled and were sent as prisoners to Memphis and New Orleans, half eventually winding up in Johnson's Island prison camp in Ohio. Since the terms of the parole were not in agreement with parole conditions acceptable to the Union and Confederate armies then current, the Confederate Army furloughed the returned troops until September 15, 1863, then returned them to duty. This outraged some leaders of the Union army, but General Halleck, in charge of US armies, admitted the paroles were in error.

The reputation of black soldiers in Union service was enhanced by the siege. The advance of the Louisiana Guard on May 27 had gained much coverage in northern newspapers. The attack was repulsed, due to its hasty implementation, but was bravely carried out in spite of the hopeless magnitude of opposing conditions. This performance was noted by the army leadership. In a letter home, Captain Robert F. Wilkinson wrote, "One thing I am glad to say, that is that the black troops at P. Hudson fought & acted superbly. The theory of negro inefficiency is, I am very thankful at last thoroughly exploded by facts. We shall shortly have a splendid army of thousands of them." General Banks also noted their performance in his official report, stating, "The severe test to which they were subjected, and the determined manner in which they encountered the enemy, leaves upon my mind no doubt of their ultimate success." These reports had an impact far from Louisiana, or the Union army. On June 11, 1863, an editorial from the influential and widely read New York Times stated, "They were comparatively raw troops, and were yet subjected to the most awful ordeal... The men, white or black, who will not flinch from that, will flinch from nothing. It is no longer possible to doubt the bravery and steadiness of the colored race, when rightly led." These observations did much to support abolitionist efforts in the northeast to recruit free blacks for the Union armed services. By the end of the war nearly 200,000 blacks had served in the Union forces.

A significant result of the siege was the blow it gave Banks's political ambitions. If Banks had overrun the position in May, he could then have taken command of Grant's siege of Vicksburg as the ranking officer and appeared a hero. This would have redeemed his military reputation, and bolstered his political hopes for a presidential candidacy. Since Vicksburg fell before Port Hudson, Grant reaped the promotions and reputation for victory in the west, and eventually attained the White House, Banks's cherished ambition. As it was, Banks had to settle for setting up cotton deals for his northeast constituency, and arrange political alliances for a new state government aligned with Union and Republican interests in mind. He was quite experienced in this kind of scheming, and in the absence of military opportunities, economic advantages beckoned. Banks's armies had gathered $3 million worth of livestock and supplies while engaged in operations in western Louisiana in the spring of 1863. This bounty impressed Banks, and it was also estimated that vast stores of cotton and many Union sympathizers were waiting on the Red River in eastern Texas. In response to these observations, Banks produced his one third holding plan, the idea of re-opening trade with Europe, and diverting one third of the proceeds for the Federal Treasury. This economic bonanza would once again revive his political prospects, and justify the beginning of the Red River Campaign, a military expedition into eastern Texas, the next step in military operations in Louisiana.

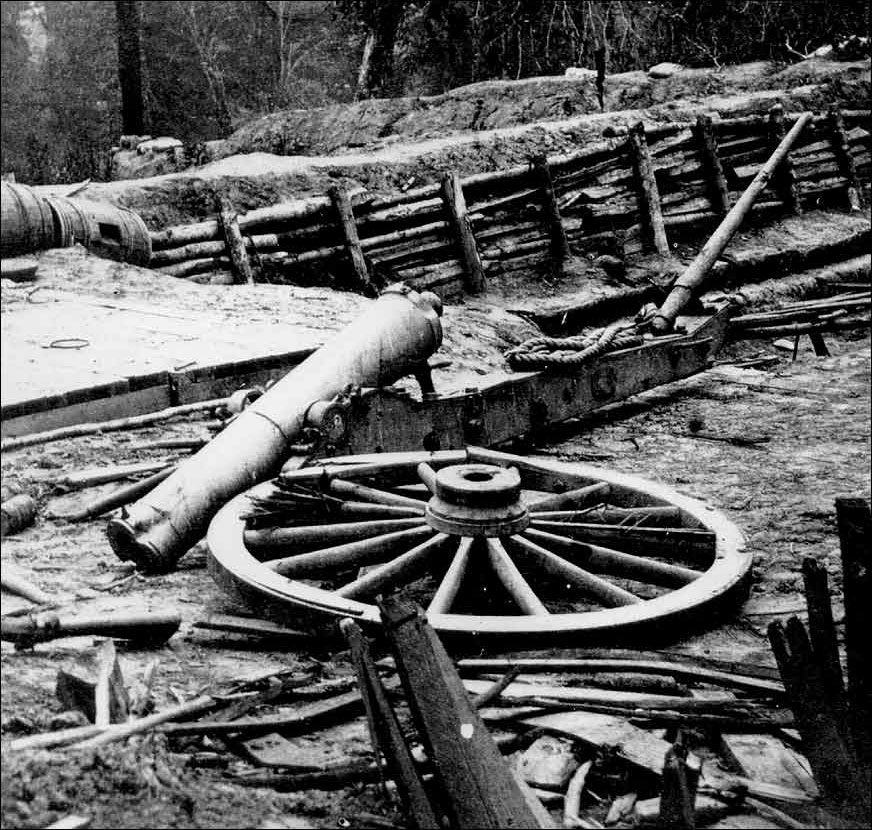
Confederate cannon demolished by Federal artillery fire in Fort Desperate

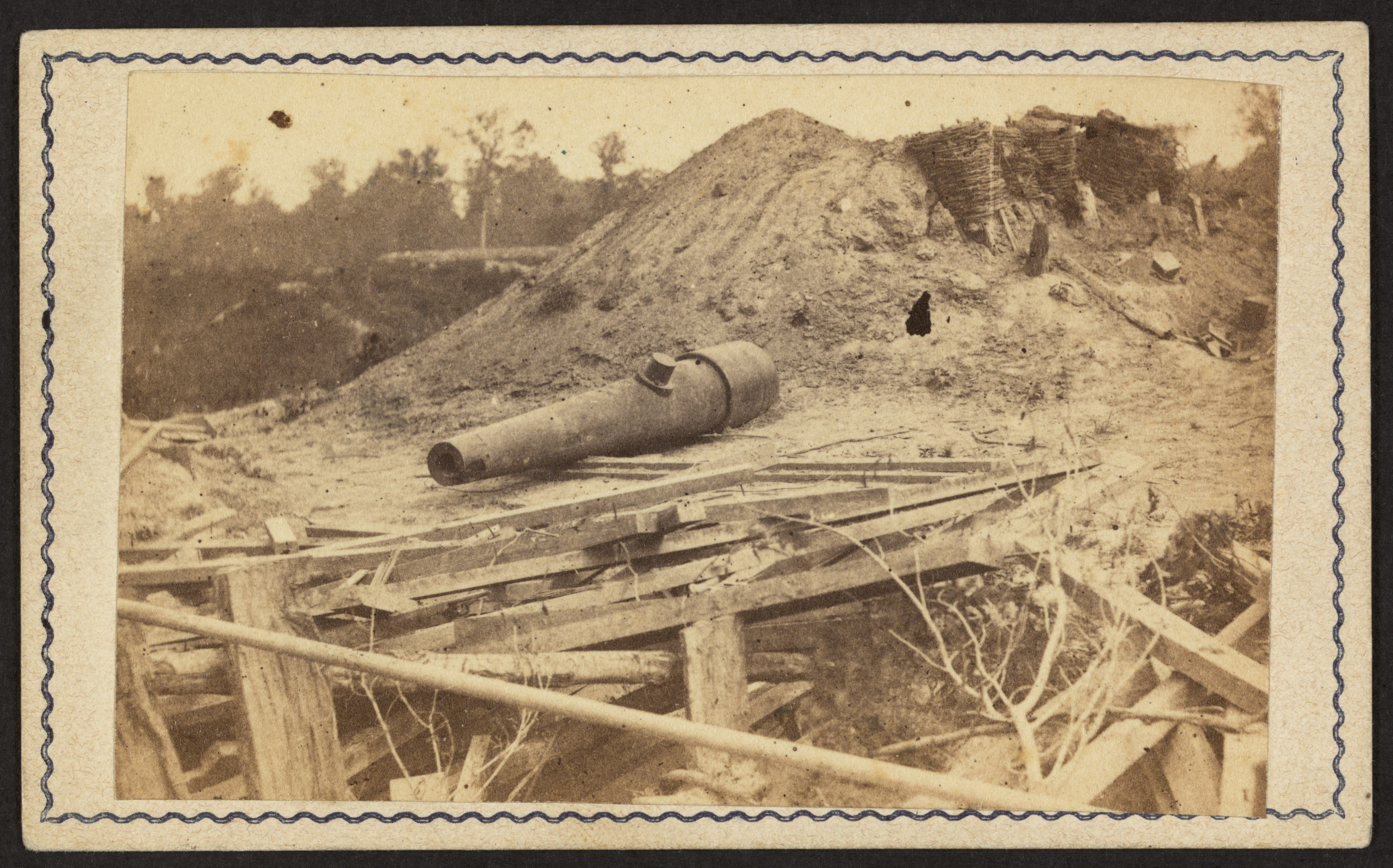
Dismounted cannon and ruins, Port Hudson

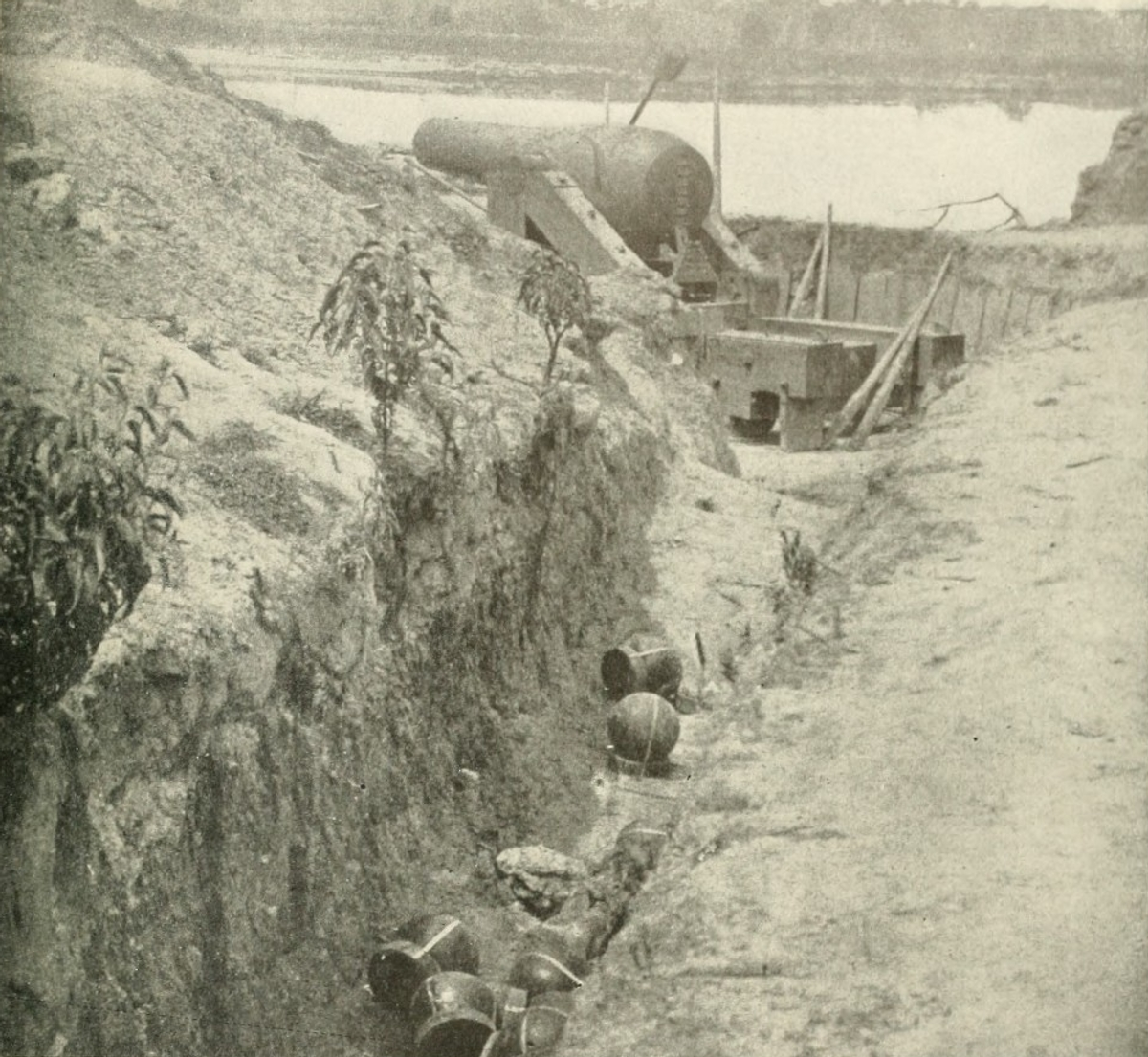
Heavy gun on the riverside fortifications

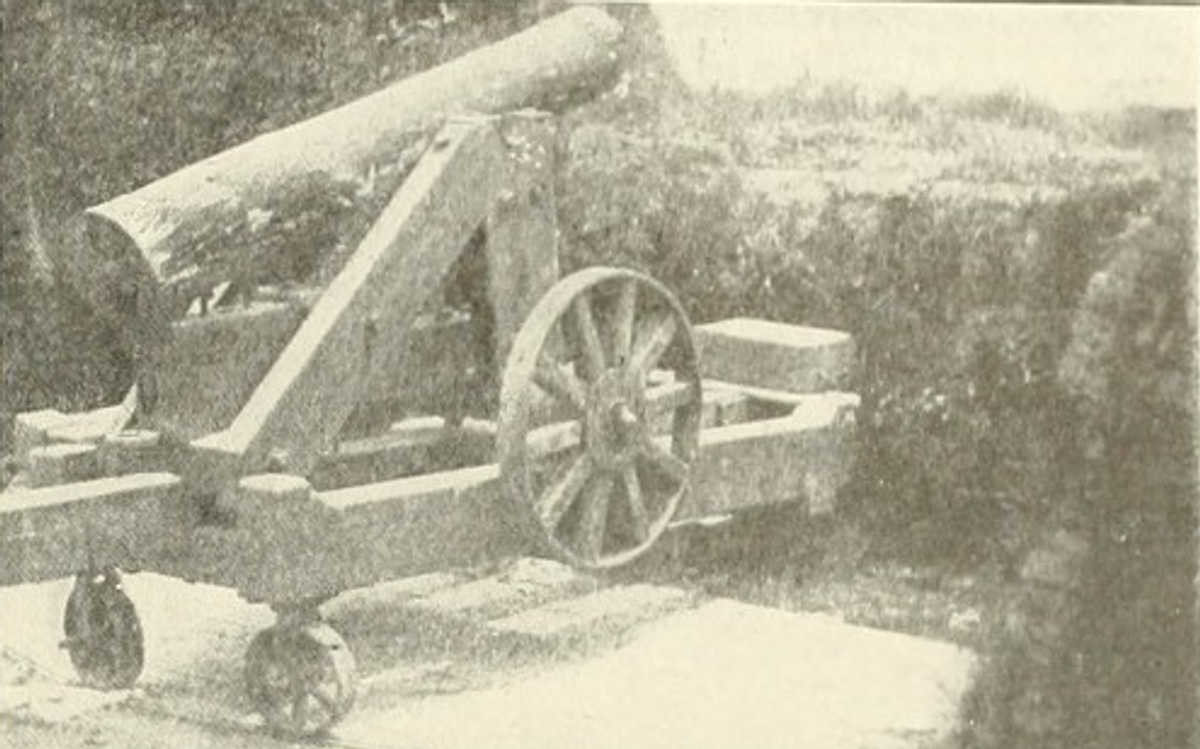
Quaker gun

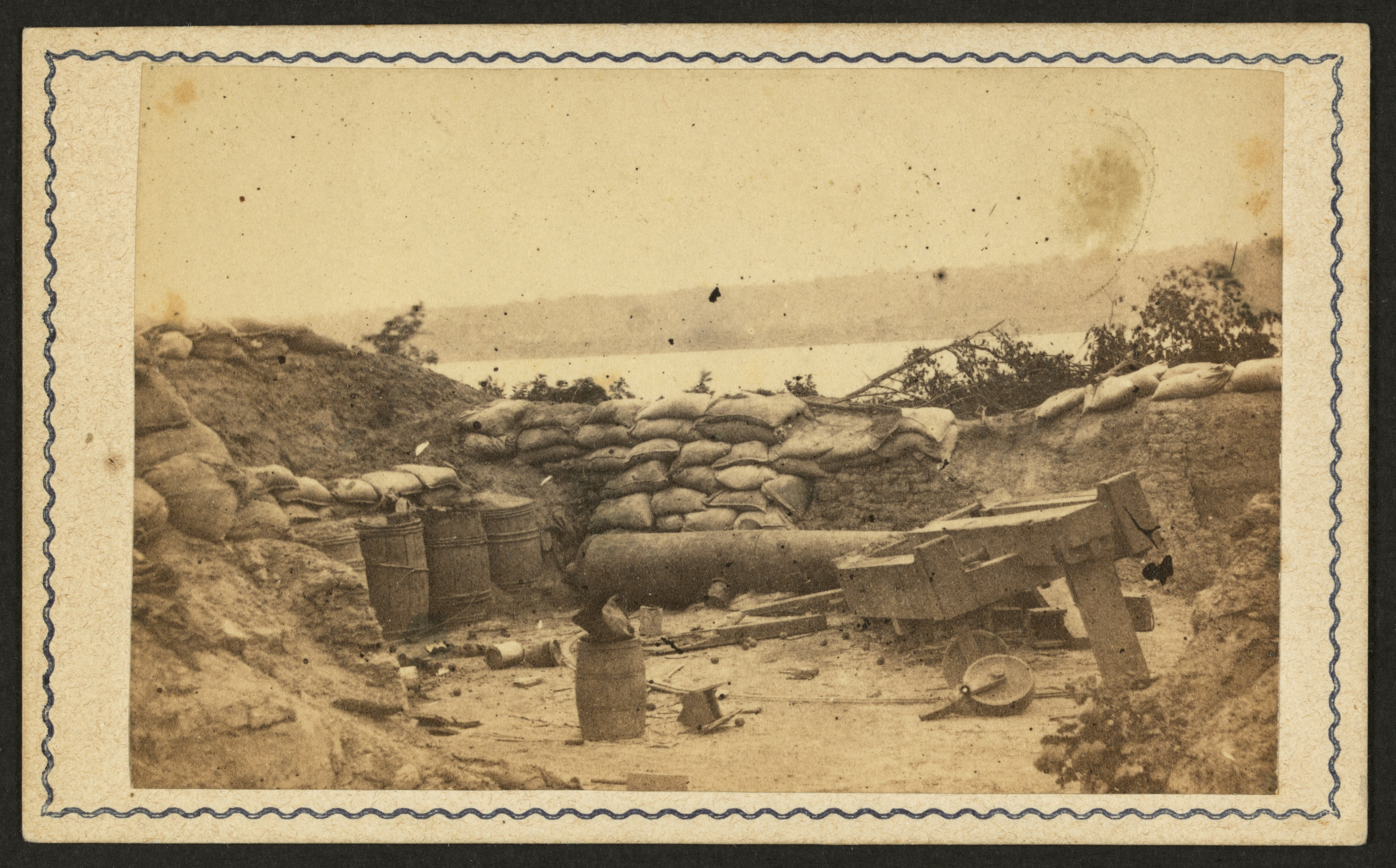
Demolished gun battery

After the war, a small number of former soldiers were awarded the Medal of Honor for their actions at Port Hudson, including George Mason Lovering of the 4th Massachusetts, and future Wyoming Governor, Francis E. Warren of the 49th Massachusetts.

== Battlefield preservation ==
The American Battlefield Trust and its partners have acquired and preserved 259 acres of the Port Hudson Battlefield. The Port Hudson State Historic Site has steep riverside terraces with original artillery emplacements. It has a museum with displays and maps.

== See also ==
- Port Hudson State Historic Site
- Port Hudson National Cemetery

== Notes ==
Footnotes

Abbreviations used in these notes
Official atlas: Atlas to accompany the official records of the Union and Confederate armies.
ORA (Official records, armies): War of the Rebellion: a compilation of the official records of the Union and Confederate Armies.
ORN (Official records, navies): Official records of the Union and Confederate Navies in the War of the Rebellion.
