= Holbrook, Massachusetts =

Town in Massachusetts, United States

- Town
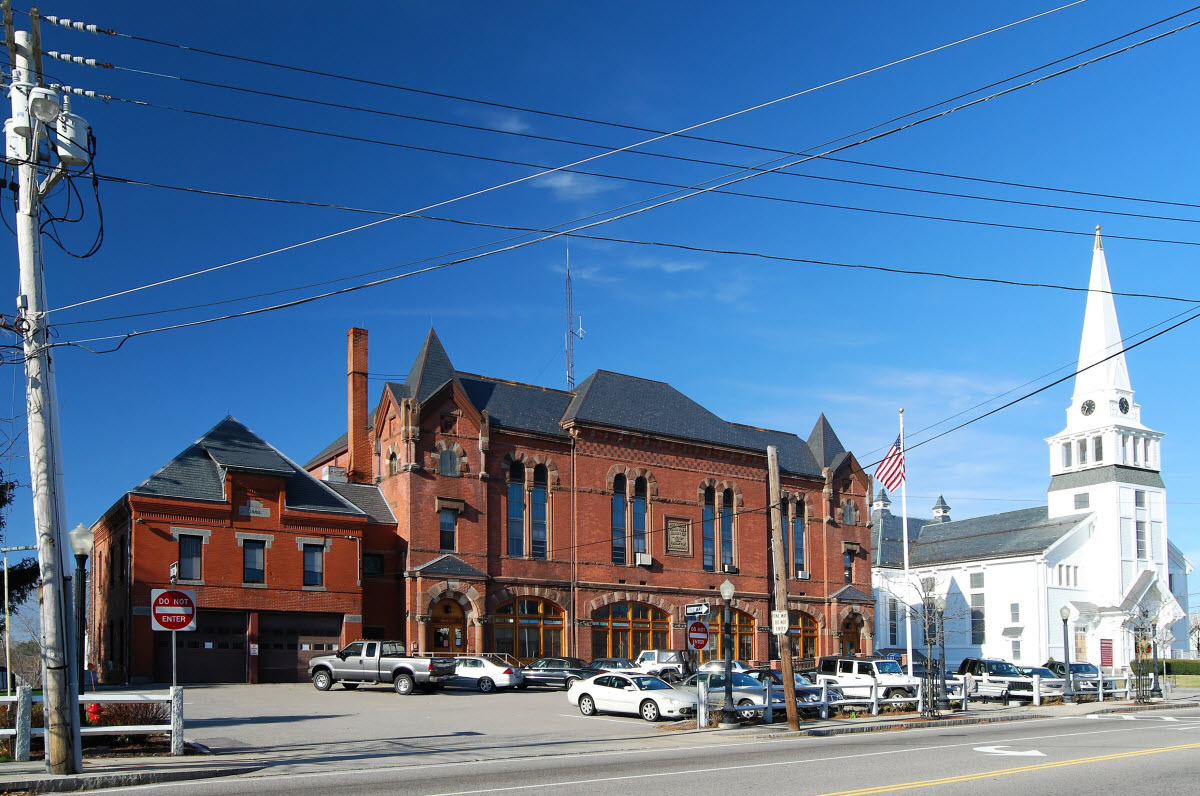
- Town Hall

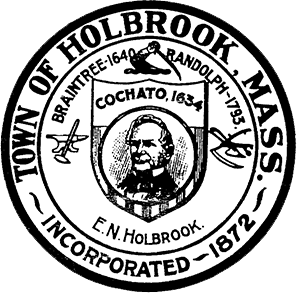
- Seal

- Location in Norfolk County in Massachusetts
- Coordinates: 42°09′18″N 71°00′33″W
- Country: United States
- State: Massachusetts
- County: Norfolk
- Settled: 1710
- Incorporated: 1872

Government
  - Type: Representative town meeting
  - Town Administrator: Anne Mahoney

Area
  - Total: 7.4 sq mi (19.2 km^{2})
  - Land: 7.3 sq mi (19.0 km^{2})
  - Water: 0.039 sq mi (0.1 km^{2})
- Elevation: 213 ft (65 m)

Population (2020)
  - Total: 11,405
  - Density: 1,550/sq mi (600/km^{2})
- Time zone: UTC−5 (Eastern)
  - Summer (DST): UTC−4 (Eastern)
- ZIP Code: 02343
- Area code: 781
- FIPS code: 25-30455
- GNIS feature ID: 0618322
- Website: holbrookma.gov

Holbrook is a town in Norfolk County, Massachusetts, United States. As of 2023, the town's population was 11,405.

== History ==
Holbrook was first settled by Europeans (mostly British colonists) in 1710 as the southern part of Old Braintree, and was officially incorporated on February 29, 1872, the last town created from the former lands of Braintree. It used to be known as East Randolph, being divided from Randolph by track from the Old Colony Railroad line.

In the 18th and 19th centuries, farming and cottage trades, particularly shoe production, dominated the economy. Slowly, the town evolved into a primarily residential community, with many residents commuting to work in Boston proper and the primary employment within the town being in service industries.

Some residents served during the Civil War, and members of the famed 54th Massachusetts Volunteer Infantry are buried in Union Cemetery. The impact of the War came not only from the residents' direct participation in the conflict, but was also from the need for production of boots for soldiers. It was during the Civil War that shoe production became a significant component of the town's economic life, and production moved decidedly from the home and into factories.

The story of Holbrook's split from Randolph begins in 1871, when pressure had been building in East Randolph for an independent town. After a little "misunderstanding" (according to Randolph brethren, the Eastern group used rather stronger language) about the placement of a cupola on top of Stetson Hall as a vent for the gas lighting, the pot boiled over, and East Randolph petitioned to be incorporated as a separate town.

The town was named for benefactor Elisha N. Holbrook, who provided the town with the funds for the town hall and library upon incorporation.

Holbrook's residents again took up arms in the First and Second World Wars. The latter had a great impact on the life of the community. After 1945, demobilization created a building boom and altered the economy and lifestyle across the United States. Holbrook experienced a housing boom and became a largely residential community, in which some service industry provides local jobs, but from which most residents commute to work in Greater Boston.

Holbrook once held the Baird and McGuire chemical plant, which in 1982 was added to the EPA National Priorities list. The site was the nation's 14th worst Superfund site when it was listed in 1982, and thus cleanup work began immediately. As of June 17, 1997, the EPA concluded primary cleanup operations at the site. Efforts included the incineration of 248,000 tons of soil, including sediment dredged from the Cochato River. Total cost was approximately $133 million, including the construction of a water treatment plant that is still in operation.

== Geography ==
According to the United States Census Bureau, the town has a total area of 7.4 square miles (19.2 km^{2}), of which 7.3 square miles (19.0 km^{2}) is land and 0.1 square mile (0.1 km^{2}) (0.69%) is water.

Holbrook borders Braintree to the north, Weymouth to the east, Abington to the southeast, Brockton to the southwest, Randolph and Avon to the west.

== Demographics ==
Historical population
Year	Pop.	±%
1880	2,130	—
1890	2,474	+16.2%
1900	2,229	−9.9%
1910	2,816	+26.3%
1920	3,161	+12.3%
1930	3,353	+6.1%
1940	3,330	−0.7%
1950	4,004	+20.2%
1960	10,104	+152.3%
1970	11,775	+16.5%
1980	11,140	−5.4%
1990	11,041	−0.9%
2000	10,785	−2.3%
2010	10,791	+0.1%
2020	11,405	+5.7%
2023*	11,284	−1.1%
* = population estimate. Source: United States Census records and Population Estimates Program data.

At the 2020 census, the total population of Holbrook was 11,405 people. The population density was 1,563.6 inhabitants per square mile (603.7/km^{2}). There were 4,879 housing units at an average density of 564.8 per square mile (218.1/km^{2}).

There were 4,712 households, and 2.4 people per household. 57.3% of households included married couples. Another 8.5% were a sole male resident, and 18.7% a solo female resident.

=== Race and nationality ===
The racial makeup of the town was 75% White alone, 11.5% Black or African American, 1.30% Asian and Pacific Islander, 1.11% from other races, and 10.6% from two or more races. Hispanic or Latino of any race were 7.2% of the population. 12.6% of the population was born outside the United States.

=== Age ===
The population in 2020 was 19.3% under 18 (of which, 4.9% were under age 5), and 17.5% over the age of 65. The remaining 63.2% of Holbrook residents were between 18-64, which is similar to other areas in the region.

Age of Residents
Age	Percent
0-9	9.7%
10-19	12.8%
20-29	6.8%
30-39	14.3%
40-49	16.3%
50-59	14.9%
60-69	13.5%
70-79	8.2%
80+	3.6%

=== Income and education ===
The median household income was $89,763 The per capita income for the town was $41,324. About 7% of the population was below the poverty line, including 12.6% of those age 65 or over, and 0.9% of children under 18.

93.2% of Holbrook's residents graduated from high school. Another 30.6% attained a higher education: 23.4% have a Bachelor's, and 7.2% have a post-graduate degree. Only 6.9% of the population in Holbrook had no degree at all, compared to the state's 8.8% of people with no degree.

== Government ==
Holbrook was governed by an open town meeting from its incorporation until 1974, when citizens voted to adopt a representative town meeting, dividing the town into four precincts with 60 representatives each. In 2021, representatives rejected a petition to revert to an open town meeting.

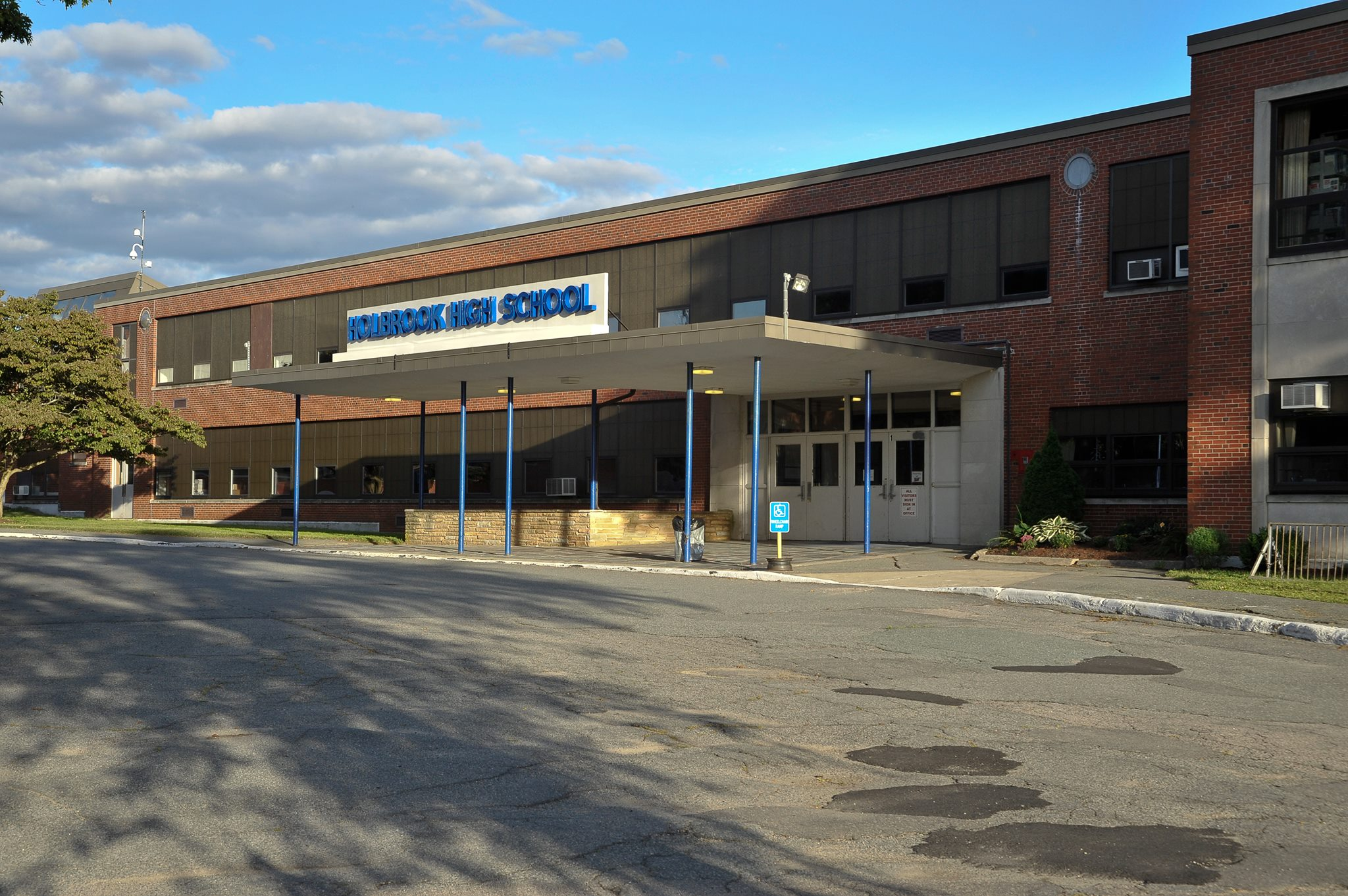
The former Holbrook High School building's entrance.

== Education ==
Holbrook has two schools, both located within the same complex. They were formally opened in 2017. The new schools are:

- John F. Kennedy Elementary School (PreK–5)
- Holbrook Middle-High School (6–12)

These replaced the town's three schools, including the John F. Kennedy Elementary School (PreK–3) and the South Elementary School (4–6). The new school is on the same lot that the Holbrook Junior-Senior High School (7–12) once stood.

== Infrastructure ==
=== Transportation ===
The principal highways are Routes 37 and 139, which intersect at the center of the town.

Commuter rail service to South Station, Boston, is available on the Fall River/New Bedford line from the Holbrook/Randolph Rail Station.

Holbrook is a member of the Massachusetts Bay Transportation Authority (MBTA), which provides fixed bus route service to Quincy Center, Braintree Station, and Montello Commuter Rail Station in Brockton. Holbrook is served by the 230 Bus from Quincy Center Station. The MBTA also provides THE RIDE, a paratransit service for the elderly and disabled. The 238 and 240 buses operate from Holbrook-Randolph Station on the town line, which provides access to Quincy Center MBTA Station, Avon, and Ashmont MBTA station.

== Notable people ==
- Elihu Adams, Brother of President John Adams and a Minuteman in the Continental Army
- Andrew Card, Former White House Chief of Staff under George W. Bush (January 20, 2001 – April 14, 2006)
- George Mason Lovering, Recipient of the Medal of Honor
- Jim Mann, professional baseball pitcher in parts of four seasons
- Joe Pernice, Indie rock singer/songwriter, leader of Pernice Brothers and Scud Mountain Boys
- Michael Sullivan, Former United States Attorney for the District of Massachusetts
