= Battle of Island Number Ten order of battle: Confederate =

The following Confederate Army units and commanders fought in the Battle of Island Number Ten during the American Civil War. Order of battle compiled from the official reports.

== Abbreviations used ==
=== Military rank ===
- MG = Major General
- BG = Brigadier General
- Col = Colonel
- Ltc = Lieutenant Colonel
- Maj = Major
- Cpt = Captain
- Lt = Lieutenant

=== Other ===
- w = wounded
- mw = mortally wounded
- k = killed

== Forces at Madrid Bend, February 28-March 17, 1862 ==
BG John P. McCown

=== New Madrid Garrison ===
BG Alexander P. Stewart

Post	Regiments and Others
Fort Thompson; Col Edward W. Gantt	11th Arkansas: Col Jabez M. Smith; 12th Arkansas: Ltc W. D. S. Cook; Upton's Heavy Artillery Company; Stewart's Heavy Artillery Company: Cpt J. W. Stewart; Co. A, Pointe Coupee (Louisiana) Artillery: Cpt Richard A. Stewart
Fort Bankhead; Col Lucius M. Walker	5th Tennessee: Col William E. Travis; 40th Tennessee: Col C. C. Henderson; 1st Alabama, Tennessee, & Mississippi: Col Alpheus Baker; Bankhead's Tennessee Battery: Cpt Smith P. Bankhead

=== Island No. 10 Garrison ===
Brigade	Regiments and Others
Neely's Brigade; Col Rufus P. Neely	12th Louisiana: Col Thomas M. Scott; 4th Tennessee: Col Rufus P. Neely; 31st Tennessee: Col A. H. Bradford
Marks' Brigade; Col Samuel F. Marks	11th Louisiana: Col Samuel F. Marks; 5th Louisiana Battalion: Col J. G. Kennedy
Stewart's Brigade	4th Arkansas Battalion: Ltc Francis A. Terry; 55th Tennessee: Col Alexander J. Brown
Not Brigaded	46th Tennessee: Col. John M. Clark
Cavalry	Haywood's Tennessee Company; Hudson's Mississippi Squadron; Neely's Tennessee Company: Cpt J. J. Neely; Wheeler's Tennessee Company
Artillery; BG James Trudeau	Jackson's Tennessee Company: Cpt Andrew Jackson, Jr.; Sterling's Tennessee Company: Cpt Robert Sterling; Humes' Tennessee Company: Cpt William Y.C. Humes; Hoadley's Arkansas Company: Cpt Frederick W. Hoadley; Jones' Tennessee Company: Cpt W. C. Jones; Dismuke's Arkansas Company: Cpt Paul T. Dismuke; Caruther's Tennessee Company: Cpt Caruthers; Fisher's Tennessee Company: Cpt James A. Fisher; Johnston's Tennessee Siege Battery (Southern Guards): Cpt Thomas Johnston; Rucker's Company: Cpt Edmund W. Rucker

== Forces at Madrid Bend, March 19-April 7, 1862 ==
MG John P. McCown
BG William W. Mackall

Brigade	Regiments and Others
First Brigade; BG Lucius M. Walker	46th Tennessee: Col John M. Clark; 40th Tennessee: Ltc C. C. Henderson; 1st Alabama: Col Isaiah G. W. Steedman; 1st Alabama, Tennessee, & Mississippi: Col Alpheus Baker
Second Brigade; BG Edward W. Gantt	11th Arkansas: Col Jabez M. Smith; 12th Arkansas: Ltc W. D. S. Cook; 4th Arkansas Battalion: Ltc Francis A. Terry; 55th Tennessee: Col Alexander J. Brown
Cavalry	Hudson's Mississippi Squadron; Wheeler's Tennessee Company
Artillery; BG James Trudeau	Upton's Tennessee Company; Stewart's Tennessee Company: Cpt J. W. Stewart; Jackson's Tennessee Company: Cpt Andrew Jackson, Jr.; Sterling's Tennessee Company: Cpt Robert Sterling; Humes' Tennessee Company: Cpt William Y. C. Humes; Hoadley's Arkansas Company: Cpt Frederick W. Hoadley; Jones' Tennessee Company: Cpt W. C. Jones; Dismuke's Arkansas Company: Cpt Paul T. Dismuke; Caruther's Tennessee Company: Cpt Caruthers; Fisher's Tennessee Company: Cpt James A. Fisher; Rucker's Company: Cpt Edmund W. Rucker; Johnston's Tennessee Siege Battery (Southern Guards): Cpt Thomas Johnston; Co. B, Pointe Coupee (Louisiana) Artillery: Cpt Wm. A. Davidson

== Confederate Navy Mississippi Flotilla ==
Commodore George N. Hollins

Vessels
C.S.S. McRae

Lt Thomas B. Huger

C.S.S. Livingston

Commander R. F. Pinkney

C.S.S. General Polk

Lt Commander J. H. Carter

C.S.S. Pontchartrain

Lt Commander John W. Dunnington

C.S.S. Maurepas

Lt Joseph Fry

C.S.S. Jackson

Lt. F. B. Renshaw

C.S.S. Ivy
C.S.S. New Orleans

Lt Samuel W. Averett
