= John W. Dunnington =

Confederate military officer (1833–1882)

John William Dunnington
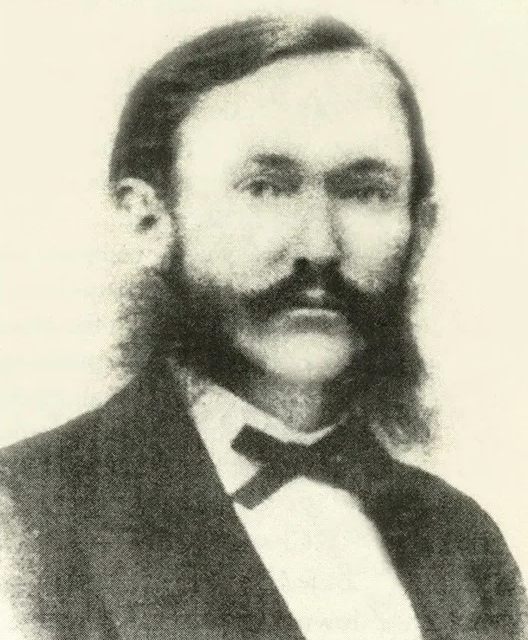
- Born: May 18, 1833; Christian County, Kentucky, U.S.
- Died: March 10, 1882 (aged 48) Columbia, Tennessee, U.S.
- Allegiance: United States of America; Confederate States of America
- Branch: United States Navy; Confederate States Navy; Confederate States Army
- Service years: 1849–1861 (United States); 1861–1865 (Confederate States)
- Rank: Lieutenant (United States); First lieutenant (Confederate States Navy); Colonel (Confederate States Army)
- Commands: CSS Tuscarora; CSS Calhoun; CSS Pontchartrain; Chief of Ordnance, Trans-Mississippi Department; Owl (blockade runner); CSS Virginia II
- Conflicts: Battle of the Head of Passes; Battle of Island Number Ten; Battle of St. Charles; Battle of Arkansas Post; Battle of Trent's Reach

John William Dunnington (May 18, 1833 – March 10, 1882) was a Confederate military officer in the American Civil War. Born in 1833 in Kentucky, Dunnington joined the United States Navy in 1849 and attended the United States Naval Academy. With the outbreak of the American Civil War in 1861, Dunnington resigned his naval commission, joined the Confederacy, and was appointed as an officer in the Confederate States Navy. Initially assigned to CSS McRae, he commanded the gunboat CSS Tuscarora before the latter vessel burned in November. After a brief command of the CSS Calhoun in late 1861, Dunnington took command of the gunboat CSS Pontchartrain in early 1862 and saw action at the Battle of Island Number Ten. On June 17, Dunnington and a detachment from Pontchartrain operated two guns taken from the vessel as part of the Confederate defenses in the Battle of St. Charles.

Following the Confederate defeat at St. Charles, Dunnington went to Little Rock, Arkansas, where he was appointed chief of ordnance for the Trans-Mississippi Department in August. Afterward, Dunnington was assigned to oversee Confederate river defenses in Arkansas, and commanded a brigade during the Battle of Arkansas Post in January 1863. After the Confederate surrender at Arkansas Post, Dunnington was held at the prisoner-of-war camp at Johnson's Island until he was exchanged in April or May 1863. He then participated in an unsuccessful international mission to secure supplies for the Confederacy, commanded the blockade runner Owl for a run from Bermuda to Wilmington, North Carolina, and was eventually transferred to the James River Squadron. Dunnington took command of the ironclad CSS Virginia II in December 1864, and commanded her at the Battle of Trent's Reach in January 1865. After service as a major in a naval brigade, Dunnington surrendered on April 26, 1865, in the closing days of the war. He then moved to Tennessee where he farmed, dying in 1882.

== Biography ==
=== United States service and early Confederate service ===
John William Dunnington, the son of parents who had moved to Christian County, Kentucky, from Maryland, was born on May 18, 1833. He joined the United States Navy on April 10, 1849. Dunnington attended the United States Naval Academy from at least October 1854 to June 1855, after which he passed the lieutenant's examination. As a result, on June 12, 1855, Dunnington received a promotion to passed midshipman. A further promotion, to master in line of promotion, followed on September 16, 1855. In October 1856, he was promoted to the rank of lieutenant. As part of his naval service, Dunnington was aboard USS Mohican when it captured an illegal slave ship captained by Nathaniel Gordon in August 1860. Detached and awaiting orders after the capture of the slave ship, Dunnington traveled to Columbia, Tennessee.

After the American Civil War began, Dunnington resigned his commission on April 25 or April 26 and joined the Confederate States Navy, being given a commission on May 2 as a first lieutenant. As early as April 22 he had been providing assistance to the Governor of Tennessee, Isham G. Harris, in the placement of river defenses against the United States. Dunnington's first assignment for the Confederate navy was to the steam sloop CSS McRae; he was present when a group of Confederate vessels including McRae drove off several Union (United States) vessels on October 12 in the Battle of the Head of Passes. On November 12, Dunnington was assigned to command the gunboat CSS Tuscarora. (Note: Another source indicates that Dunnington received this assignment in August 1861.) While steaming up the Mississippi River to Columbus, Kentucky, Tuscarora caught fire under unclear circumstances on November 23 and was destroyed. Apparently not considered culpable for the loss of Tuscarora, Dunnington was assigned to command the gunboat CSS Calhoun, but this only lasted until December 9 when he was placed on shore duty. On December 30, he was ordered to command a sidewheel steamer which became the CSS Pontchartrain. Dunnington was responsible for supervising the end of the conversion of Pontchartrain from a civilian vessel into a warship at New Orleans, Louisiana. After Pontchartrain was commissioned in March 1862, Dunnington took her up the Mississippi River as part of a movement of Confederate ships upriver under the command of George N. Hollins.

After arriving upriver, Dunnington and Pontchartrain were involved in the Battle of Island Number Ten, including in a ship versus shore fight with Union batteries at Point Pleasant, Missouri. The Confederates withdrew from New Madrid, Missouri, in early April, The Confederate warships from the Island Number Ten operations withdrew downriver to Fort Pillow, but Pontchartrain and the gunboat CSS Maurepas were reassigned to the White River. Dunnington and the commander of Maurepas, Joseph Fry, supervised the construction of fortifications for the defense of the White River near St. Charles, Arkansas, in May. Two of Pontchartrain's 32-pounder guns were offloaded at the St. Charles defenses, while the gunboat herself was sent to the Arkansas River, which it ascended to Little Rock. After arriving at Little Rock, thirty-five sailors and officers from Pontchartrain, including Dunnington, volunteered to reinforce the Confederate position at St. Charles, which was now threatened by a Union expedition up the White River.

=== Service in Arkansas ===
Dunnington and his men arrived at St. Charles on the evening of June 16; by that time the smoke from the Union vessels could be seen from the St. Charles fortifications. The sailors from Pontchartrain manned the two 32-pounder guns that had come from their vessel. The Battle of St. Charles was fought the next day. One of Dunnington's 32-pounder guns fired a shot during the battle that struck the steam drum of the Union ironclad USS Mound City and disabled the ship. However, a Union infantry assault overran the Confederate fortifications. Dunnington escaped back to Little Rock. Following this, Dunnington was responsible for the conversion of the steamer Tom Sugg into an ad hoc gunboat; while Dunnington was assigned command of the Tom Sugg, he appears to have devoted little of his personal presence to the vessel. He was also tasked with the command of a battery of naval guns emplaced in a shore fortification at DeValls Bluff, upriver from St. Charles.

On August 2, Dunnington was appointed as a colonel of artillery by Major General Thomas C. Hindman, becoming the chief of ordnance for the Trans-Mississippi Department. In this role, Dunnington oversaw the re-opening of the Little Rock Arsenal where he oversaw the production of 10,000 cartridges in August, as well the repair of firearms. Dunnington's department also included ordnance works at Camden, Arkadelphia, and Fort Smith in Arkansas. In his time as chief of ordnance, Dunnington also sought to restore Confederate niter mining operations in Arkansas; he anticipated spending $4,000 to operate a niter cave for the third quarter of 1862.

Tasked with the construction of riverine defenses on the Arkansas and White rivers on either September 28, or October 28, Dunnington was replaced by Major George D. Alexander as departmental chief of ordnance on November 1. Dunnington, along with Confederate military engineers A. M. Williams and Robert H. Fitzhugh, selected the site for what became Fort Hindman on the Arkansas River at Arkansas Post, Arkansas. Some of the cannon at Fort Hindman had previously been on Pontchartrain. Confederate Brigadier General Thomas J. Churchill was assigned to command Fort Hindman in December. Churchill divided his force into three brigades, one of which was commanded by Dunnington. During the Battle of Arkansas Post in January 1863, Dunnington's force manned the river-facing defenses, and included a group of sailors formerly of Pontchartrain. On January 11, the Confederates at Arkansas Post surrendered, and the prisoners were loaded on transports the next day to be sent north into captivity.

=== Later Confederate service ===
Dunnington was held at the Johnson's Island prisoner-of-war camp in Ohio. After receiving a parole, Dunnington was sent to Fort Monroe in Virginia. He was exchanged on April 11, or May 5, 1863. The Confederate government intended to convert Pontchartrain into an ironclad warship, and Dunnington was given $30,500 and sent back to Little Rock for this purpose. The work progressed slowly and it is unclear how much of the conversion was completed before Pontchartrain was burned when the Confederates abandoned Little Rock in September 1863. Having been ordered to report to the Confederate naval commander at Mobile, Alabama, Dunnington reached that city on roughly November 1.

The Confederacy originally intended for Dunnington to be involved in a secret mission to infiltrate behind Union lines and capture and destroy Union vessels at St. Louis, Missouri, but this was deemed impracticable. Dunnington received another naval commission as first lieutenant on January 6, 1864. Likely beginning in January 1864, Dunnington was involved in a secret mission which involved the intended purchase of an unknown object in a foreign country. He traveled to Canada and the United Kingdom without making the intended purchase. After recovering from an illness in Paris, Dunnington made multiple attempts to run through the Union blockade but was unsuccessful. Ending up in Bermuda due to a yellow fever outbreak on one of the ships which had attempted a blockade run, he contracted the disease himself. After recovering from yellow fever, Dunnington commanded the blockade runner Owl in a trip that ran from Bermuda to Wilmington, North Carolina, via Nassau. Owl reached Confederate-held Wilmington on December 2; by the end of the month he had been assigned to command the ironclad CSS Virginia II, which was part of the James River Squadron. He commanded the ironclad at the Battle of Trent's Reach in January 1865. The Confederates abandoned their national capital of Richmond, Virginia, in April, and Virginia II was burned. Dunnington was assigned to a naval brigade commanded by Rear Admiral Raphael Semmes, in which Dunnington held the rank of major. On April 26, Dunnington surrendered in North Carolina along with Joseph E. Johnston's Confederate force in the waning days of the war. After the war, Dunnington was a cotton planter in Mississippi, but then moved to Tennessee, residing in Maury County. A farmer, he married Susan Gray Booker in June 1869, dying in Columbia, Tennessee, on March 10, 1882, having been in poor health for the preceding eight years.

== Sources ==
- Bearss, Edwin C. (1962). "The White River Expedition June 10–July 15, 1862". Arkansas Historical Quarterly. 21 (4): 305–362. doi:10.2307/40035686. ISSN 0004-1823. JSTOR 40035686. OCLC 150147194.
- Bearss, Edwin C. (1985). The Campaign for Vicksburg. Vol. I: Vicksburg is the Key. Dayton, Ohio: Morningside House. ISBN 089029-312-0.
- Chatelain, Neil P. (2020). Defending the Arteries of Rebellion: Confederate Naval Operations in the Mississippi River Valley, 1861–1865. El Dorado Hills, California: Savas Beatie. ISBN 978-1-61121-510-6.
- Coski, John M. (2005) [1996]. Capital Navy: The Men, Ships, and Operations of the James River Squadron. New York: Savas Beatie. ISBN 978-1-932714-15-9.
- Hasegawa, Guy R. (2025). "The Versatile Lt. John W. Dunnington, CSN". Civil War Navy. Vol. 13, no. 2. Brunswick, Georgia: CSA Media, LLC.
- Johnston, James J. (2000). "Bullets for Johnny Reb: Confederate Nitre and Mining Bureau in Arkansas". In Bailey, Anne J.; Sutherland, Daniel E. (eds.). Civil War Arkansas: Beyond Battles and Leaders. Fayetteville, Arkansas: University of Arkansas. pp. 47–84. ISBN 1-55728-565-9.
- Smith, Myron J. (2015). Civil War Biographies from the Western Waters. Jefferson, North Carolina: McFarland & Company. ISBN 978-0-7864-6967-3.
