= CSS Pontchartrain =

Gunboat of the Confederate States Navy

Coordinates: 34°45′09.8″N 92°16′07.4″W

History

Confederate States
- Name: Pontchartrain
- Namesake: Lake Pontchartrain
- Launched: 1859
- Commissioned: March 1862
- In service: Purchased from civilian service, October 12, 1861
- Fate: Destroyed by her crew, September 10, 1863

General characteristics
- Type: Side-wheel steamer
- Tonnage: 454 tons
- Length: 204 feet (62 m)
- Beam: 36 feet 6 inches (11.13 m)
- Draft: 10 feet (3.0 m)
- Armament: 7 cannons

CSS Pontchartrain was a gunboat that served in the Confederate States Navy during the American Civil War. Built in 1859 for passenger and cotton trade, she was purchased by the Confederates in October 1862. After seeing action against Union land positions during the campaigns for New Madrid, Missouri, and Island Number Ten, she was transferred to serve on the Arkansas River and the White River. In June 1862, two of her cannons were taken to a land fortification at St. Charles, Arkansas, where part of her crew saw action in the Battle of St. Charles while manning the guns. Her other cannons were then offloaded at Fort Hindman, where more of her crew were captured while fighting on land at the Battle of Arkansas Post in January 1863. Pontchartrain herself remained inactive at Little Rock, Arkansas, and was burned to prevent capture in September 1863 when the Confederates evacuated the city.

== Construction and characteristics ==
In 1859, the side-wheel steamer Lizzie Simmons, which was also known as Eliza Simmons, was constructed at New Albany, Indiana. She was named after the wife of a planter in Louisiana and was intended to work in both the passenger trade and the cotton trade. In 1860, the ship ran on the route between New Orleans, Louisiana, and the Ouachita River before then moving to the route between New Orleans and Memphis, Tennessee. While on the New Orleans to Ouachita route, her ship's captain was George Hamilton Kirk; on the second route it was W. B. Richardson. She had a tonnage of 454 tons, a length of 204 feet (62 m), a beam of 36 feet 6 inches (11.13 m), and a draft of 10 feet (3.0 m). The vessel did not have a mast and was powered by two side-wheels. Her sister ship would become CSS Maurepas, having previously been known as Grosse Tete.

== Service history ==
=== New Madrid and Island Number Ten ===
After the outbreak of the American Civil War, the Confederate States Navy purchased a number of vessels for military use. One of these was Lizzie Simmons, which was purchased on October 12, 1861, while at New Orleans. During January and February 1862, the vessel went through the process of conversion into a gunboat. The conversion work used nearly 80,000 board feet of pine, with roughly 800 board feet of cypress and another 800 board feet of oak. The Confederates armed her with seven cannons, including an 8-inch (20 cm) smoothbore of a model similar to the Paixhans gun and two 32-pounder (14.5 kilogram) rifled guns. Renamed to Pontchartrain, she was commissioned into Confederate service in March and placed under the command of First Lieutenant John W. Dunnington, who had previously served on the gunboats CSS McRae and CSS Tuscarora. After her commissioning, she was sent up the Mississippi River to support the Confederate defenses at Columbus, Kentucky.

On March 6, Union troops occupied Point Pleasant, Missouri, in an attempt to cut off the Confederate defenders of New Madrid, Missouri. Pontchartrain and the gunboat CSS General Polk were sent to investigate the movement. After coming too close to shore, Pontchartrain came under musket fire, which killed or wounded several aboard. The two Confederate vessels fired on the Union position and made several more sorties over the next three days, but were not able to dislodge the Union forces. A week later, Union troops made a demonstration against the Confederate defenses of New Madrid and Pontchartrain joined Confederate land fortifications in firing on the Union troops. The Confederates decided to abandon New Madrid. That night, Pontchartrain, along with McRae, the gunboat CSS Ivy, and several transports, took Confederate troops, supplies, and weapons from one of the forts guarding New Madrid downriver to Tiptonville, Tennessee, past the Union position at Point Pleasant. Pontchartrain was tasked with transporting artillery ammunition and troops during the withdrawal.

With Confederate forces still holding out on Island Number Ten, Union forces established an artillery position across the Mississippi River from Tiptonville, with hopes of cutting the only supply line to Island Number Ten. On March 18, the Union artillery at the new position opened fired on some Confederate transports. Pontchartrain, Maurepas, General Polk, and McRae were sent downriver. During the exchange, Maurepas and General Polk were damaged, and the Confederate vessels withdrew downstream. While the Union guns temporarily withdrew, they later returned and along with the position at Point Pleasant made riverine supply to Island Number Ten difficult. In early April, two Union ironclads ran downriver past Island Number Ten, cutting off the Confederate garrison, which attempted to withdraw but was caught and forced to surrender.

=== Arkansas ===
The Confederate vessels withdrew to Fort Pillow, and after learning of Union vessels in the area, sortied against them, only to quickly withdraw upon learning that the Union flotilla was both strong and prepared. Afterwards, Pontchartrain and Maurepas were transferred to serve on the Arkansas River and the White River. The two 32-pounder rifled guns were sent from Pontchartrain to St. Charles, Arkansas, on June 8, to be emplaced in a fortification there on the White River. According to historian Ed Bearss, Pontchartrain had been sent up the Arkansas River to Little Rock, so the guns had to be shipped by both rail and water to get them to St. Charles. Naval historian Neil Chatelain states that Pontchartrain first traveled up the White River, offloaded the cannon at St. Charles, and then traveled up the Arkansas River to Little Rock. Dunnington and some of his men stayed to St. Charles to man the guns, and were present on June 17 when Union troops overran the position in the Battle of St. Charles, although Dunnington and his men were able to escape capture.

Dunnington marched the remaining sailors overland to return to Pontchartrain, which they then took down the Arkansas River to Fort Hindman. The ship's heavy guns were offloaded, and 35 sailors remained behind to man them, along with Dunnington. Pontchartrain then returned upriver to Little Rock, where the Confederates began the process of converting her into a naval ram and started armoring her with wood and iron. Dunnington and his men were captured in mid-January 1863 in the Battle of Arkansas Post. Pontchartrain remained inactive into the summer. The only Confederate warship remaining in Arkansas, Pontchartrain was an item of concern for Union naval forces. In February, a strike up the Arkansas River to destroy the gunboat was proposed, but never occurred. Rumors spread in April that Pontchartrain was preparing to attack, but this did not occur either. Historian Mark K. Christ suggests that both movements did not occur because of low river levels. Unverified Union intelligence reports from July 1863 indicated that Pontchartrain had the capability to mount seven cannon, which were not present, and that iron armor had been added for protection of her engines. In September, as Union forces were about to capture Little Rock, the Confederates burned Pontchartrain. Christ states that she was burned on September 10, while naval historian W. Craig Gaines states that the burning occurred on September 9. A commemorative marker has been erected where the ship was burned.
