= Betsey Cook =

Nurse for the Union Army during the American Civil War

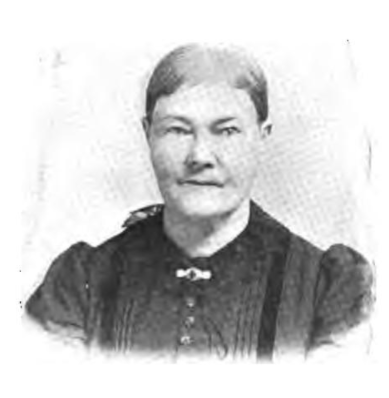
Betsey A. Cook, Civil War Nurse, Union Army

Betsey A. Cook was a nurse for the Union Army during the American Civil War, serving from 1861 to 1863.

== Civil War service ==
Not much is known about Cook's early life, except that she was living in Augusta, Illinois at the outbreak of the Civil War. Cook's husband enlisted initially, beginning his service with the 2nd Illinois Cavalry in July 1861. His enlistment initially prompted Cook to relocate to her father's home. In a letter to Mary Holland, Cook writes that her father's home was in Jackson, and though she does not specify which state, the context leads readers to suggest she was referring to Jackson, Michigan. It was actually Cook's husband who encouraged her to become a nurse, asking her to enlist as a part of "Delano's Dragoons", the nickname for Company L of the 2nd Regiment, for its commander, S. G. Delano. Ultimately, Cook was stationed at Fort Halt [sic], Kentucky, (Note: Fort Holt, named for former Secretary of War Joseph Holt, was a Civil War era fort located at the mouth of Mayfield Creek near Fort Jefferson to defend the shipyards of Mound City, Illinois and the confluence of the Mississippi and Ohio Rivers. There were more than 2,000 Union soldiers at Fort Jefferson and 3,595 more at Fort Holt by late September 1861.) arriving in the middle of October. Cook served under Dr. Reese P. Kendall at this location; she remained under his guidance throughout most of her army career. Like the soldiers, Cook lived and worked in tents throughout most of her time in the service, and experienced much of the same hardships as the soldiers. Though the group built cabins for shelter as the winter months came, rising water levels forced the unite to leave their cabins behind and head up the Ohio River towards Camp Pain. Cook remained at this location until returning to Michigan for a brief period in February 1862.

After the Union capture of Island Number Ten, Cook then went to serve there in October 1862 with Doctor Kendall once again. At the camp, she was in charge of clothing, hospital supplies, and preparing food for the sick. During her time at Island Number Ten, Cook was well-loved by the soldiers particularly because she was able to cook much more appetizing bread than what was served previously. In June 1863, Cook followed her husband to Columbus and remained there until late August. In Columbus, Cook oversaw cooking and hospital supplies. Soon, however, her husband was ordered to his company, and Cook returned to her home in Augusta.

== After the war ==
After the war, Cook applied for a pension for her wartime services but she was denied; apparently, the women who recruited Cook was not legally authorized to appoint nurses. In her aforementioned letter to Mary Holland, Cook wrote that "if I never receive any pay, I have the satisfaction of knowing that I did what I could to help in the great struggle for Union and the flag."
