= CSS Maurepas =

Confederate states sidewheel steamer

History

Confederate States
- Name: Maurepas
- Namesake: Lake Maurepas
- Owner: J. A. Cotton; Bayou Sara Mail Company
- Launched: 1858
- In service: Purchased from civilian service, 1861
- Fate: Sunk as obstruction, June 17, 1862

General characteristics
- Type: Sidewheel steamer
- Tonnage: 399
- Length: 180 feet (55 m)
- Beam: 34 feet (10 m)
- Draft: 7 feet (2.1 m)
- Propulsion: Steam
- Complement: 79
- Armament: 5 or 6 cannons; 1x 9-inch Dahlgren gun; 24-pounders; 32-pounders

CSS Maurepas was a sidewheel steamer that briefly served as a gunboat in the Confederate States Navy during the American Civil War. Built in 1858 in Indiana as Grosse Tete (English: "big head"), the vessel was used in commercial trade until 1860 and then delivered mail until 1861, when she was acquired by the Confederate Navy.

After being outfitted with five or six cannons and renamed Maurepas, she was sent to the defenses of Columbus, Kentucky, in March 1862, and participated in actions near Island Number Ten. After an abortive naval skirmish near Fort Pillow in Tennessee, Maurepas and the gunboat CSS Pontchartrain were sent up the White River to resist Union advances and aid transport. On June 16, the eve of the Battle of Saint Charles, Maurepas was sunk as an obstruction and her cannons sent ashore.

== Service history ==
=== Construction and civilian usage ===
A sidewheel steamer, the vessel was constructed at New Albany, Indiana, in 1858, under the name Grosse Tete, having been ordered by one J. A. Cotton of New Orleans, Louisiana. She was 180 feet (55 m) long, had a beam of 34 feet (10 m), measured 399 tons, and had a draft of 7 feet (2.1 m). It had two sidewheels, a wooden hull, and held a crew of 79. A photograph identified as Gross Tete shows a vessel with only one steamboat deck, as opposed to the standard two. The naval historian Donald L. Canney speculates that the steamboat was intended to run on trade routes that included Bayou Gross Tete and Grosse Tête, Louisiana. Under Captain Isacc Hopper, Grosse Tete was used for commercial trade until 1860, when she was purchased by the Bayou Sara Mail Company for mail delivery. Her captain after the purchase was J. McQuoid.

=== Confederate States Navy ===
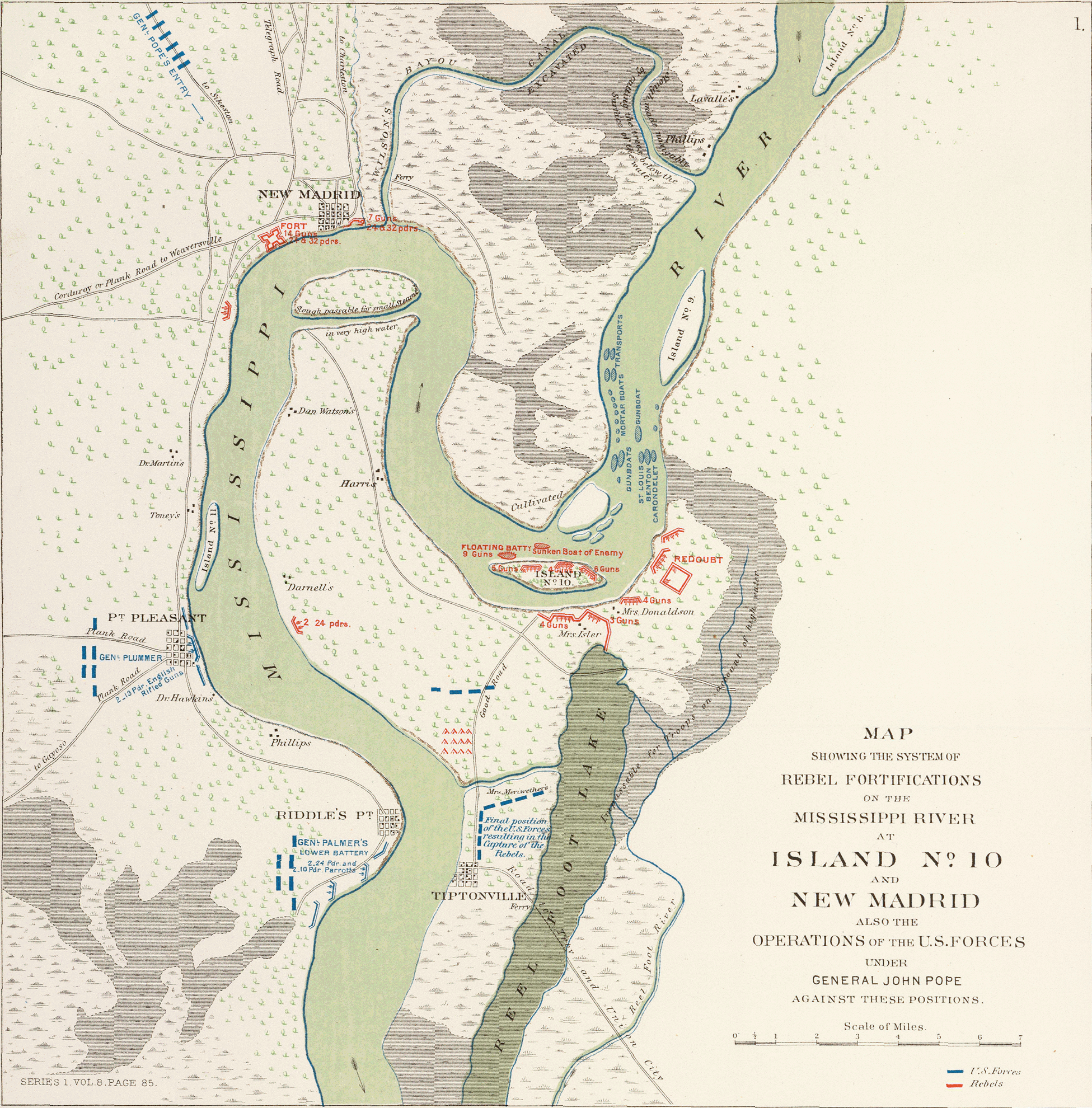
Map of the Island Number Ten area, showing the Union position across from Tiptonville

After the outbreak of the American Civil War, Grosse Tete was purchased by the Confederate States Navy at New Orleans in November 1861 to be used as a gunboat, although her sidewheel propulsion system was considered less useful than if she was a screw steamer. The Confederates rechristened her Maurepas, after Lake Maurepas, and placed her under the command of First Lieutenant Joseph Fry, formerly of the gunboat CSS Ivy. An early report stated the vessel was armed with six cannon, although a later one from February 1862 listed only five. According to naval historian W. Craig Gaines, these pieces were 24-pounders and 32-pounders; she was reported to have had at least one 9-inch Dahlgren gun in April 1862. It is not known if the difference in cannon count between reports represents a piece being removed or if the previous figure of six was an error. Beginning in November 1861, a number of Confederate warships were sent north up the Mississippi River to support the defenses at Columbus, Kentucky. Maurepas made this journey in March 1862. At Columbus, the vessel was part of a fleet commanded by Commander George N. Hollins.

Beginning on March 12, Maurepas helped defend Island Number Ten. Union Navy forces were bombarding the island, and Brigadier General John M. Palmer's Union troops had established batteries downriver across the Mississippi from Tiptonville, Tennessee, in hopes of cutting off Island Number Ten's supply line. On March 18, Palmer's position opened fire on Confederate transports. In response, Hollins sent Maurepas and the gunboats CSS Pontchartrain, CSS McRae, and CSS General Polk, downriver to shell Palmer's position. Return fire from the Union position struck the Confederate ships. General Polk was hit by cannon fire, started taking on water, and had to go downriver and out of the fight. Maurepas was struck eight or nine times by cannon fire and 30 or 40 times by small arms fire and suffered damage, with internal damage to cabins, her decks covered with splinters, and a ship's boat knocked away. Eventually, Palmer's men fell back, and Hollins's ships withdrew from the area. However, the Union troops reoccupied the position, and Hollins took his ships downriver to avoid fire from the batteries. Any ships heading upstream to Island Number Ten came under fire from Palmer's position.

On the night of April 4/5, the ironclad USS Carondelet ran past the Confederate defenses of Island Number Ten to New Madrid, Missouri, which was under Union control. A second Union ironclad, USS Pittsburgh, completed the run early on the morning of April 7, and most of the Confederates withdrew from Island Number Ten during the night of April 7/8, as it was no longer feasible to hold the island. However, Union forces cut the Confederates off from their escape route at Tiptonville, and the garrison of the island was captured. Hollins's ships were prevented from going to their support by the two Union ironclads. The Confederate ships then withdrew to Fort Pillow in Tennessee. On April 9, Hollins was informed that New Orleans was threatened, so he traveled downriver with Ivy and the gunboat CSS Jackson. In Hollins's absence, the ships were temporarily commanded by First Lieutenant Thomas Huger, with Commander Robert Pinckney expected to arrive shortly to take command. Huger learned that Union ships were nearby and on the morning of April 12, sent his ships upriver for a surprise attack. Union scouts picked up the movement, and the ironclad USS Benton fired on Huger's fleet. Maurepas responded with a shot from a 9-inch Dahlgren gun, to no effect. After navigating a bend in the river, the Confederate ships realized they were facing a large and prepared Union fleet and fell back to Fort Pillow. The Union ships pursued to a range close enough for them to bombard the fort. Pinckney soon arrived to take command, and sent Maurepas and Pontchartrain to operate on the White River to resist Union advances and serve as transports.

On June 2, Maurepas was at the junction of the White River and the Black River. On June 13, a Union Navy flotilla left Memphis, Tennessee, to travel up the White with the intention of resupplying Union land forces further north in Arkansas. Composed of two ironclads and two timberclads, the Union fleet moved upriver. Two guns from Pontchartrain were taken ashore near St. Charles, with sailors and a portion of the 29th Arkansas Infantry Regiment manning the fortifications. The Union ships approached St. Charles on June 16, but did not attack that day. As planned obstructions in the river were not complete, Maurepas and two civilian steamboats were sunk in the river as a blockage, but not before three or four guns from the ship were removed. It had been thought that Maurepas would be outmatched against the Union ironclads. The next day, in the Battle of Saint Charles, the Union forces brushed aside the Confederate defenses, although a cannon shot struck the ironclad USS Mound City, puncturing the ship's steam drum and scalding most of those on board. The Union supply mission eventually failed due to low water levels, and the infantry force had to march overland to a point from which they could be resupplied. For years after the battle, the wreck of Maurepas could be seen at low water, but is no longer visible.

== Sources ==
- Bearss, Edwin C. (1962). "The White River Expedition June 10–July 15, 1862". Arkansas Historical Quarterly. 21 (4): 305–362. doi:10.2307/40035686. JSTOR 40035686.
- Canney, Donald L. (2015). The Confederate Steam Navy 1861–1865. Atglen, Pennsylvania: Schiffer. ISBN 978-0-7643-4824-2.
- Chatelain, Neil P. (2020). Defending the Arteries of Rebellion: Confederate Naval Operations in the Mississippi River Valley, 1861–1865. El Dorado Hills, California: Savas Beatie. ISBN 978-1-61121-510-6.
- Christ, Mark K. (2012). ""The Awful Scenes That Met My Eyes": Union and Confederate Accounts of the Battle of St. Charles, June 17, 1862". Arkansas Historical Quarterly. 71 (4): 407–423. JSTOR 23390055.
- Gaines, W. Craig (2008). Encyclopedia of Civil War Shipwrecks. Baton Rouge, Louisiana: Louisiana State University Press. ISBN 978-0-8071-3274-6.
- Kennedy, Frances H., ed. (1998). The Civil War Battlefield Guide (2nd ed.). Boston/New York: Houghton Mifflin. ISBN 978-0-395-74012-5.
- Way, Frederick (1994). Way's Packet Directory, 1848–1994: Passenger Steamboats of the Mississippi River System Since the Advent of Photography in Mid-Continent America. Athens, Ohio: Ohio University. ISBN 0821411063.
