= CSS Tuscarora =

Confederate states sidewheel steamer

History

Confederate States
- Name: Tuscarora
- Owner: Southern Steamship Company
- Launched: 1861
- In service: Purchased from civilian service, 1861
- Fate: Accidentally burned, November 23, 1861

General characteristics
- Type: Sidewheel steamer
- Displacement: 400 short tons (357 long tons)
- Length: c.100 feet (30 m)
- Propulsion: Steam
- Complement: 25
- Armament: 1x rifled 32-pounder; 1x 8-inch columbiad

CSS Tuscarora was a sidewheel steamer that briefly served as a gunboat in the Confederate States Navy at the beginning of the American Civil War. She was about 100 feet (30 m) long, displaced 400 short tons (357 long tons), and was manned by a 25-man crew. The vessel was purchased in 1861 from the Southern Steamship Company by Confederate authorities in New Orleans, Louisiana. Armed with two cannons, Tuscarora was engaged in the Battle of the Head of Passes on October 12, 1861. Ordered up the Mississippi River to Columbus, Kentucky, in November, she was destroyed on November 23, 1861, when a fire of unknown origin started in her boilers and spread to the ship's munitions.

== Service history ==
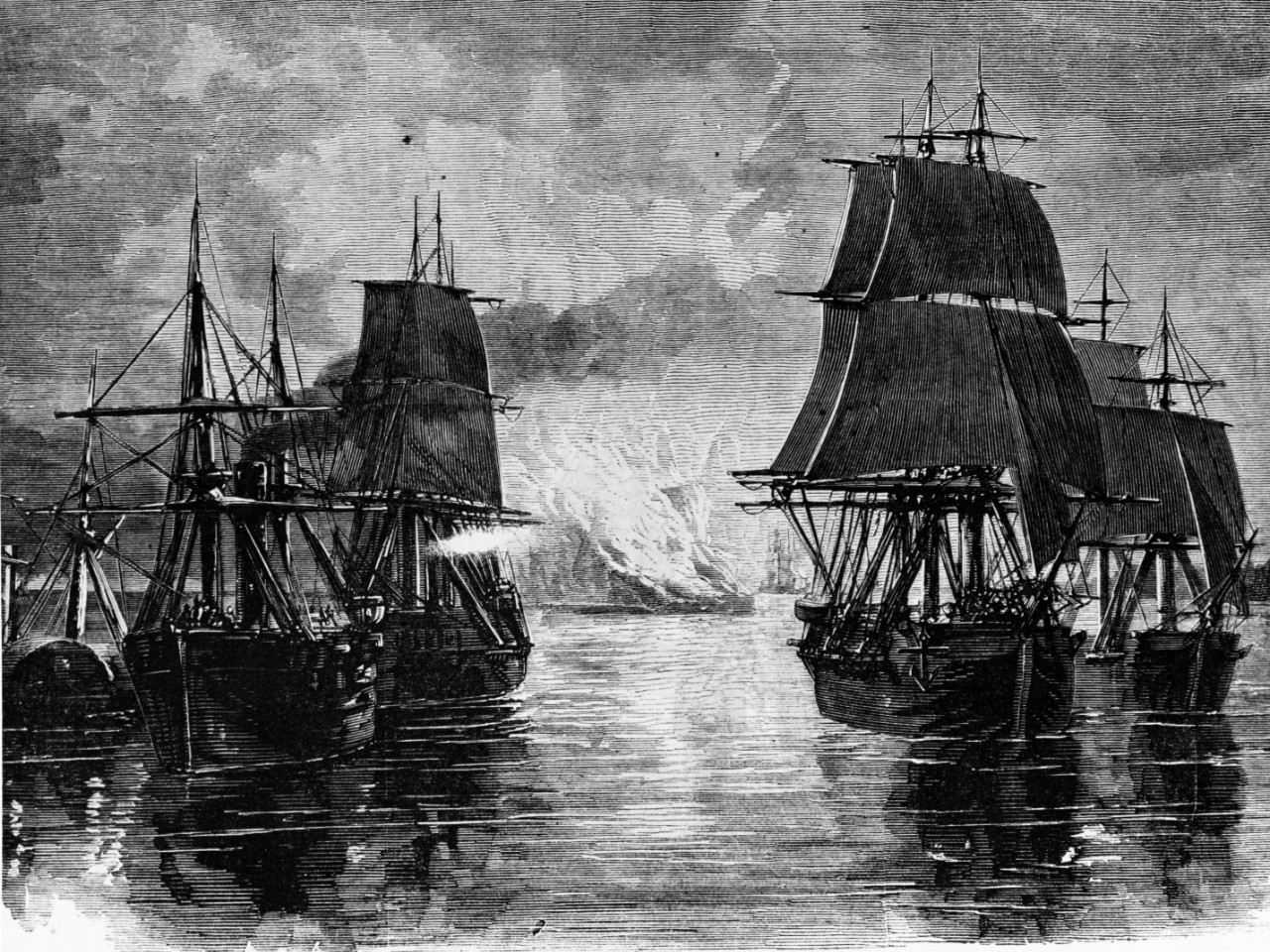
Union ships approached by the Confederate fire rafts at the Battle of the Head of Passes

Built at Philadelphia, Pennsylvania, in 1861, Tuscarora was a sidewheel steamer with a displacement of 400 short tons (357 long tons). In the section "Statistical Data of Confederate Ships" of the Official Records of the Union and Confederate Navies in the War of the Rebellion, no description of the ship's dimensions is provided. A newspaper article from late 1861 reported that she was about 100 feet (30 m) long. At the time of her destruction, she was manned by a crew of 25 and was said to be worth $8,000. She was operated by the Southern Steamship Company, which was based in New Orleans, Louisiana, seeing service as a towboat. The Southern Steamship Company was owned by Charles Morgan and ran six routes in the Gulf of Mexico, including United States mail service.

Tuscarora was purchased by the Confederate States Navy later in 1861. Confederate officials at New Orleans had been purchasing a number of vessels for naval service, intending to increase the numerical strength of the Confederate Navy, although not all of the ships purchased were necessarily fit for military service. After being purchased, Tuscarora was outfitted to be armed with two cannons: a rifled 32-pounder cannon and an 8-inch columbiad. These cannons were mounted on pivots, with one located at the bow and another at the stern. The process of converting her from a civilian vessel to a gunboat occurred at Algiers, Louisiana. Either in August or on November 12, she was placed under the command of Lieutenant John W. Dunnington, who had previously served on the gunboat CSS McRae.

By October 11, Tuscarora was part of a naval force Commodore George N. Hollins gathered near Fort Jackson. Hollins planned to take his forces down to the Head of Passes, and drive Union Navy forces from the place. The Head of Passes was a strategically valuable point in the Mississippi River Delta. By occupying the area, the Union could more easily keep up a blockade; the site would also make a good staging area for an advance up the Mississippi. The centerpiece of his plan was the CSS Manassas, an ironclad ram. Early on the morning of October 12, the Battle of the Head of Passes took place; Tuscarora was commanded by Beverly Kennon (Note: Kennon is variously reported as either a commander or a lieutenant) during the battle. The battle began with Manassas ramming USS Richmond. Next, the Confederates released fire rafts, which did not succeed in igniting any Union ships, but did cause confusion. McRae followed the fire rafts, with the sidewheel steamer CSS Ivy and Tuscarora not far behind. Tuscarora ran aground during the battle, but was able to free herself. As the Union ships retreated down Southwest Pass at around 08:00, McRae, Ivy, and Tuscarora then advanced towards the retreating Union ships and opened fire. During its retreat, Richmond ran aground, but continued firing. Several shots from the vessel almost struck McRae and Tuscarora. After the Union ships withdrew from the Head of Passes, Hollins sent his ships back to Fort Jackson, as the Union vessels were more heavily armed than his fleet and Manassas had been disabled. Tuscarora had fired six shots during the action.

In November, Hollins began sending some of his ships, including Tuscarora, up the Mississippi River to support Confederate defenses at Columbus, Kentucky. Under the command of Dunnington, Tuscarora caught fire near Helena, Arkansas, on November 23. The fire started in the boilers and spread, being discovered under the wheelhouse. The ship was beached and ordered abandoned. Her sailors had attempted to throw her munitions into the river, but the fire reached them and set them off before this could be completed. Only seven minutes passed between the discovery of the fire and the explosion. No one was seriously injured, although the exploding ammunition flung debris that damaged a nearby plantation. The cause of the fire has never been determined. One crew member was burned on the hand, but the others escaped intact. A November 26 newspaper report described the fire's cause as a mystery, but suggested the ship's crew may have been drying shirts, which were then set ablaze by a spark. The ship was stated to still be burning on November 25. Seven men were left to conduct salvage operations, while the rest went to Memphis, Tennessee. In late March 1862, Confederate authorities were taking sealed bids to raise the wreck and bring it to New Orleans. As late as 1870, the wreck was reportedly visible at low tide.

== Sources ==
- Bearss, Edwin C. (1963). "The Fiasco at Head of Passes". Louisiana History: The Journal of the Louisiana Historical Association. 4 (4): 301–311.
- Bragg, Marion (1977). Historic Names and Places on the Lower Mississippi River. Vicksburg, Mississippi: Mississippi River Commission.
- Campbell, R. Thomas (2019). Confederate Ironclads at War. Jefferson, North Carolina: McFarland & Company. ISBN 978-1-4766-7640-1.
- Chatelain, Neil P. (2020). Defending the Arteries of Rebellion: Confederate Naval Operations in the Mississippi River Valley, 1861–1865. El Dorado Hills, California: Savas Beatie. ISBN 978-1-61121-510-6.
- Civil War Naval Chronology, 1861–1865. Washington, D.C.: Naval History Division. 1961.
- Gaines, W. Craig (2008). Encyclopedia of Civil War Shipwrecks. Baton Rouge, Louisiana: Louisiana State University Press. ISBN 978-0-8071-3274-6.
- Hasegawa, Guy R. (2025). "The Versatile Lt. John W. Dunnington, CSN". Civil War Navy. Vol. 13, no. 2. Brunswick, Georgia: CSA Media, LLC.
- Hearn, Chester G. (2001). The Capture of New Orleans 1862. Baton Rouge, Louisiana: Louisiana State University Press. ISBN 978-0-8071-4091-8.
- Official Records of the Union and Confederate Navies in the War of the Rebellion. Vol. 22. Washington, D.C.: Government Printing Office. 1908.
- Official Records of the Union and Confederate Navies in the War of the Rebellion, Series 2. U. S. Naval War Records Office. Office memoranda. Vol. 1. Washington, D.C.: Government Printing Office. 1921.
- Register of Officers of the Confederate States Navy 1861–1865. Washington, D.C.: United States Government Printing Office. 1931.
- Smith, Myron J. (2015). Civil War Biographies from the Western Waters. Jefferson, North Carolina: McFarland & Company. ISBN 978-0-7864-6967-3.
