= Battle of Arkansas Post =

1863 battle of the American Civil War

- Part of the American Civil War
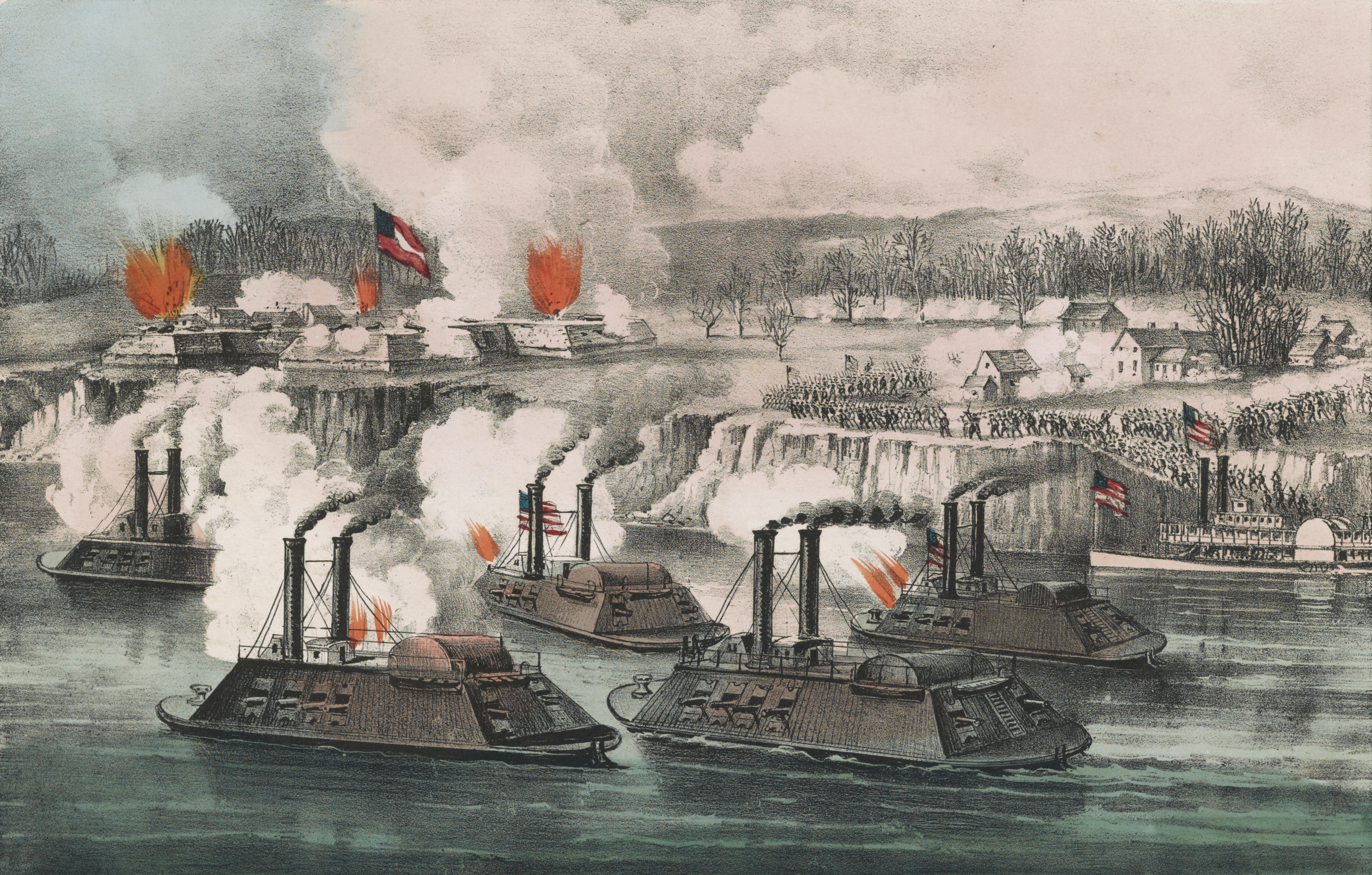
- The Bombardment and Capture of Fort Hindman, Arkansas Post, Ark. Jany. 11th 1863
Date	January 9–11, 1863
Location	Arkansas Post, Arkansas 34°01′00″N 91°20′43″W
Result	Union victory

Belligerents
United States	Confederate States

Commanders and leaders
John A. McClernand; David D. Porter	Thomas J. Churchill (surrendered)

Units involved
Army of the Mississippi; Mississippi Squadron	Garrison of Fort Hindman

Strength
~30,000	~5,000

Casualties and losses
1,092	60 killed; ~80 wounded; 4,791 captured
- Location within Arkansas

The Battle of Arkansas Post, also known as the Battle of Fort Hindman, was fought from January 9 to 11, 1863, along the Arkansas River at Arkansas Post, Arkansas, as part of the Vicksburg campaign of the American Civil War. Confederate forces constructed Fort Hindman near Arkansas Post in late 1862. Also in late 1862, Major General John A. McClernand of the Union army (as the United States Army was known during the war) was authorized to recruit troops in the Midwest for an expedition down the Mississippi River against Vicksburg, Mississippi. Union Major General Ulysses S. Grant began an overland campaign against Vicksburg along the Mississippi Central Railroad in November. He and Union General-in-Chief Henry Halleck did not trust McClernand, and through machinations placed the start of the riverine movement against Vicksburg under the command of Major General William T. Sherman before McClernand could arrive. Sherman's movement was defeated at the Battle of Chickasaw Bayou in late December, and Confederate cavalry raids forced Grant to abandon his overland campaign.

McClernand arrived at Memphis, Tennessee, in late December and found that Sherman had left without him. McClernand moved downriver, joined Sherman's force, and took command in early January 1863, calling it the Army of the Mississippi. Both Sherman and McClernand had independently come to the conclusion that Arkansas Post should be attacked: Confederate forces raiding from Fort Hindman had recently captured a Union supply vessel, and Sherman may have been hoping for a victory to restore his reputation after Chickasaw Bayou. McClernand's troops and a Union Navy fleet commanded by Acting Rear Admiral David Dixon Porter moved upriver towards the Arkansas River. The expedition began unloading troops downriver from the fort late on January 9. The next day, some of Porter's warships bombarded the fort, while McClernand's troops maneuvered into position. At 1:00 pm on January 11, Porter's warships began another bombardment of the fort, and McClernand's troops attacked the Confederate positions, which consisted of the fort and a line of rifle pits that extended west to a bayou.

McClernand's attack was repulsed, but white flags of surrender began to appear over parts of the Confederate line in uncertain circumstances. Confusion ensued, and Union troops moved up close to the Confederate line and swamped parts of it. The Confederate commander, Brigadier General Thomas J. Churchill, agreed to surrender. When Grant learned of the operation against Arkansas Post, he disapproved and ordered McClernand back to the Mississippi River, although Grant was later convinced of the wisdom of the operation. Grant relieved McClernand on January 30 and took command of the campaign against Vicksburg. In April and May, Grant's army crossed the Mississippi River downriver from Vicksburg and won a series of battles. The Confederate forces withdrew into the Vicksburg defenses in mid-May. The Siege of Vicksburg ended with a Confederate surrender on July 4, 1863; this was a key contribution to the eventual Union victory.

== Background ==
=== Initial Union plans and operations ===
Early in the American Civil War, the Union (as the United States was known during the war) military leadership developed the Anaconda Plan, a strategy to defeat the Confederate States of America by controlling its coastline and the Mississippi River. Much of the Mississippi Valley fell under Union control in early 1862 after the capture of New Orleans, Louisiana, and several land victories. The strategically important city of Vicksburg, Mississippi, was still in Confederate hands, and it served as a strong defensive position that commanded the river and prevented the Union from separating the eastern and western halves of the Confederacy. Union Navy vessels were sent upriver from New Orleans in May to try to take the city, a move that was unsuccessful. In late June, a joint army–navy expedition returned to make another campaign against Vicksburg. The Union Navy leadership decided that the city could not be taken without more infantry, who were not forthcoming. An attempt to construct Williams's Canal across a meander of the river in June and July, bypassing Vicksburg, failed.

In early November 1862, Union Major General Ulysses S. Grant began concentrating troops at Grand Junction and La Grange, Tennessee, in preparation for a campaign into the state of Mississippi along the Mississippi Central Railroad, with Vicksburg as its goal. After a delay in Tennessee to await reinforcements, Grant's troops set out in late November, and his part of the movement contained about 31,000 men, with another 17,000 in a supporting force under the command of Major General William T. Sherman. Grant at this time commanded the Department of the Tennessee, which consisted of Cairo, Illinois; Forts Henry and Donelson in Tennessee; the area west of the Tennessee River in Tennessee and Kentucky; and northern Mississippi. All of the troops in the department were part of the XIII Corps, which had a complex organizational structure.

In September, Major General John A. McClernand had discussed with President Abraham Lincoln a campaign down the Mississippi River to take control of the river, as McClernand (a former politician turned military officer) believed that Confederate control of the river was dampening support for the war in the Old Northwest. Despite some hesitancy from high-ranking Union military and political figures about McClernand's suitability for an independent command, an arrangement was reached whereby McClernand was permitted to recruit soldiers in the Midwest and then take this force downriver to operate against Vicksburg. McClernand received secret orders from Secretary of War Edwin Stanton regarding the expedition on October 21. These orders, which had originated from Lincoln but had been influenced by Halleck, gave McClernand a theoretically independent command operating in the military department commanded by Grant, and McClernand believed his command was independent. Instead, the ambiguous wording of the order gave General-in-Chief Henry Halleck the ability to redirect the troops McClernand raised for other purposes; it also stated that McClernand's operation could proceed "when a sufficient force not required by the operations of General Grant's command shall be raised". In effect, both Halleck and Grant had the power to override McClernand's campaign.

Halleck used this language in the official orders to undercut McClernand, whom he distrusted. Halleck transferred McClernand's newly recruited troops to Memphis, Tennessee, or Helena, Arkansas, as they entered service. On December 5, Halleck suggested to Grant a naval operation down the Mississippi River against Vicksburg, using a portion of Grant's force. At that time, Grant was growing concerned about the length of his supply line in Mississippi, as well as the condition of the roads ahead. Halleck had informed him that the downriver movement had the support of the President, and Grant assumed that McClernand, who Grant had a low opinion of, would command the movement. Grant decided to take control of McClernand's recruits, and placed them under the command of Sherman, who was to lead them on a riverine expedition down the Mississippi River to Vicksburg. Sherman had command of over 30,000 men, drawn from Memphis and Helena, and one division that Sherman took from Grant's main column. Presidential orders issued on December 18 divided the XIII Corps into four separate corps: a smaller XIII Corps, the XV Corps, the XVI Corps, and the XVII Corps. McClernand was given command of the new XIII Corps, but this division of the old XIII Corps did not immediately take effect as active operations by the corps were ongoing. McClernand was to command "that part of the army which was to operate down the Mississippi". Grant, in turn, knowing that Sherman was expected to begin the expedition in a matter of days, sent McClernand a letter (intentionally eschewing the faster telegraph service) authorizing him to take command of the force moving downriver. This message was not received because of Confederate cavalry raids in western Tennessee.

Acting Rear Admiral David D. Porter was in command of the Union Navy portion of the riverine movement towards Vicksburg. Sherman and the lead elements of his command left Memphis on December 20, with more troops following the next day. McClernand was still in Illinois and the force he had intended to command left without him. McClernand received communication from Halleck on December 21 confirming that he was intended to command the downriver expedition under the overall direction of Grant, but McClernand did not have direct authorization to leave Springfield, Illinois. Telegraphic communications with Stanton, who was not aware of Halleck's machinations against McClernand, produced the requisite authorization. After getting married, McClernand continued downriver and reached Memphis on December 28, where he learned that Sherman had left without him.

Confederate Major General Earl Van Dorn raided and destroyed a major Union supply center in the Holly Springs Raid, with Brigadier General Nathan Bedford Forrest's West Tennessee Raids causing even more damage to Grant's supply line through the latter half of December 1862. These raids led Grant to order a retreat. Sherman's force reached the Vicksburg area on Christmas Eve, and sailed up the Yazoo River. After landing on December 26 and 27, the Union soldiers made a frontal attack against Confederate defenses at Chickasaw Bayou on December 29, but were repulsed with heavy losses. Defeated, Sherman's men re-boarded their ships on January 1, 1863, and withdrew from the Yazoo.

=== Confederate preparations ===
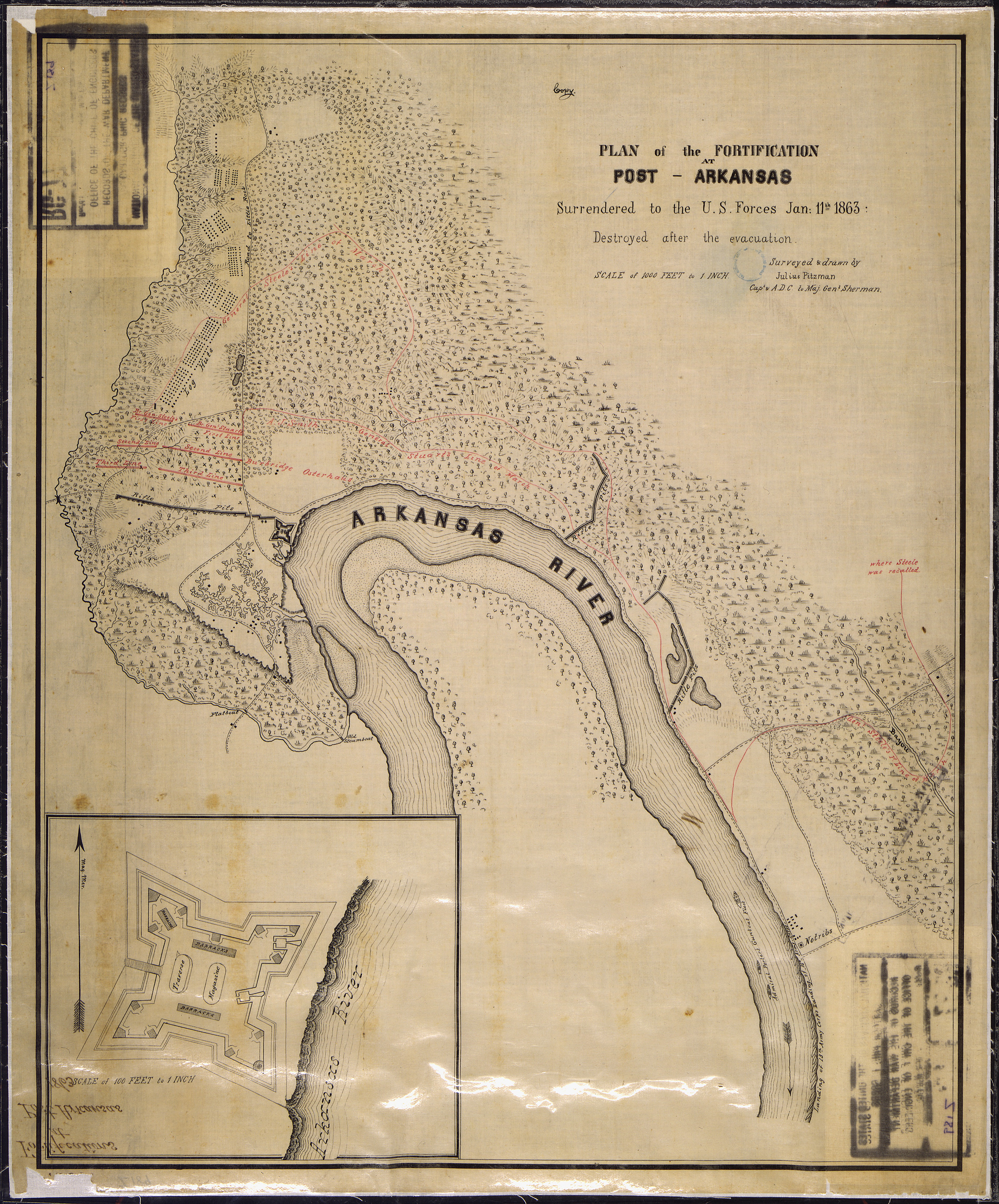
Map and plan of the fortification prepared by Julius Pitzman

Control of the Arkansas River Valley was vital for the Confederate defense of Arkansas and the Indian Territory. As late as September 1862, Confederate defenses on the Arkansas and White rivers were minimal. On September 28, Colonel John W. Dunnington, a former officer in the Confederate States Navy, was assigned to supervise Confederate river defenses within the state. Dunnington selected a location for a fortification on the Arkansas River near the settlement of Arkansas Post. The fort was located 0.25 miles (400 m) north of the village, at a point commanding the river on a hairpin curve. The labor to construct the fort was supplied by impressed slaves, a unit of Confederate military engineers, and work details from the regular Confederate units. The work on the fort itself was mostly done in October and November.

Known by both the names Fort Hindman and the Post of Arkansas, the fortification was square-shaped, with sides 100 yards (91 m) long, surrounded by a ditch that was 20 feet (6.1 m) wide and 8 feet (2.4 m) deep. Behind it was a sloped wall, with an 18 feet (5.5 m) diagonal length. On the inside of the top of the wall a firing step. The fort had four bastions, each of which had emplacements for three cannons; another cannon was on the north-side curtain wall of the fortification. The southern side of the northeastern bastion included a 18 feet (5.5 m) by 15 feet (4.6 m) casemate, one side of which was the parapet wall. Its walls and roof were composed of three layers of 14-inch (36 cm) timber; the roof was additionally protected by iron sheets nearly 1 inch (2.5 cm) thick. To cover the river approaches to the fort, a 9-inch (23 cm) Columbiad cannon was positioned in the northeastern bastion's casemate, and another in the southeastern bastion. An 8-inch (20 cm) Columbiad was mounted in another casement in the fort's southern curtain wall, which overlooked the river. Eight other cannons – four 10-pounder Parrott rifles and two 6-pounder smoothbore cannons – were distributed among the bastions. Three buildings, two magazines, and a well were located in the fort. The Columbiads were originally from the ram CSS Pontchartrain. From the northwest bastion, a line of rifle pits ran 720 yards (660 m) west to Post Bayou. The position was strengthened by obstructions placed in the river. Construction of another, outer, line of rifle pits 2 miles (3.2 km) downriver from the fort was begun, with a further, inner, tier of rifle pits between the outer line and the fort. Neither these last two lines of rifle pits nor the line between the fort and the bayou was ever completed. Many of the men assigned to defend the fort were concerned that it was poorly sited. In November, Union troops from Helena attempted to raid the fort site, but the attempt was foiled by flooding along the riverbanks caused by heavy rains. On December 10, Brigadier General Thomas J. Churchill was appointed to command the post.

== Prelude ==
Operations against Vicksburg, including the Arkansas Post Expedition (4) Confederate Union

While at Memphis, McClernand received orders from Grant which placed him in command of the downriver movement. On December 30, McClernand left Memphis to join the expedition against Vicksburg, stopping at Helena, where he met with Brigadier General Willis Gorman. McClernand and Gorman discussed the military situation at Helena, which had been stripped of troops for Sherman's operation, and the Confederate presence at Arkansas Post. In late December, Confederate troops had captured the Union supply steamer Blue Wing 8 miles (13 km) downriver from Napoleon, Arkansas, and sent it to Arkansas Post. Sherman heard of the raid, and believed that more raids from the position at Arkansas Post were likely. Viewing Arkansas Post as a threat and believing that a victory would restore his men's broken morale, Sherman began planning a movement against the Confederate position. He believed the fort could be easily captured from its land-facing side. Sherman and McClernand had independently determined that the Confederate position at Arkansas Post should be reduced.

When Sherman reached the Mississippi from the Yazoo, he met McClernand, who was upset about being maneuvered out of command. McClernand took command of the force, naming it the Army of the Mississippi, with Sherman becoming a subordinate commander in the army. Sherman was unhappy about McClernand's appointment and taking command. On the night of January 3/4, Sherman and McClernand went to speak with Porter about using his naval vessels in the proposed attack. Porter disliked McClernand and his attitude towards Sherman, but agreed to the movement after Sherman intervened. Writing about Sherman's support for the plan, Richard L. Kiper states that his motives were "somewhat suspect" and likely based on desiring a victory to restore the damage his reputation had taken from Chickasaw Bayou. McClernand informed Union Major General Samuel R. Curtis of the plan, as the operation would occur within Curtis's geographic area of command. At this time Curtis commanded the Department of the Missouri, which encompassed Missouri and Arkansas as well as other areas further west.

== Opposing forces ==
During this time, McClernand believed he was an army commander, while he really only held a corps command under Grant. (Note: American Civil War armies were generally structured so that they were made up of corps, which were in turn composed of divisions. Divisions were composed of brigades, which in turn were made up of regiments.) On January 4, McClernand named his command the Army of the Mississippi and organized it into two corps. The historian Frank J. Welcher notes that this organization change "in effect, declared McClernand's independence of Grant". Sherman commanded the Second Corps, while the First Corps was under Brigadier General George W. Morgan, whom Sherman blamed for the defeat at Chickasaw Bayou. Morgan's corps had been officially designated as the XIII Corps and Sherman's as the XV Corps by the orders of December 18, but this reorganization had not been officially implemented at that time. Both corps had two divisions: the XIII Corps had those of Brigadier Generals Andrew J. Smith and Peter J. Osterhaus, while the XV Corps' were commanded by Brigadier Generals Frederick Steele and David Stuart. Supporting artillery batteries were assigned to the divisions as follows: two with Smith's division, two with Osterhaus's, three with Steele's, and four with Stuart's. Overall, McClernand's force consisted of about 30,000 infantry, 1,000 cavalry, and 40 cannons, for a total strength of 31,753.

Churchill had about 5,000 Confederates at Arkansas Post. These men were largely dismounted cavalrymen from Arkansas and Texas, although only about 3,000 were healthy enough to fight. Most were armed with short-range carbines and shotguns as opposed to longer-range rifles. Deshler's and Garland's dismounted cavalry troops were from units that had originally been raised as cavalry but had been converted to infantry in the latter half of 1862 as there was a shortage of infantry in the Trans-Mississippi Department at that time; the men were disgruntled by the change. Churchill's command was divided into three brigades, commanded by Colonels Dunnington, Robert Garland, and James Deshler. Besides the pieces mounted in the fort, the Confederates had Hart's Arkansas Battery, which was armed with six cannons and was assigned to Garland's brigade. Garland's brigade also included a company of Louisiana cavalry, and three more companies of cavalry from Louisiana and Texas were present but not assigned to any of the brigades.

== Battle ==
=== January 9 and 10 ===
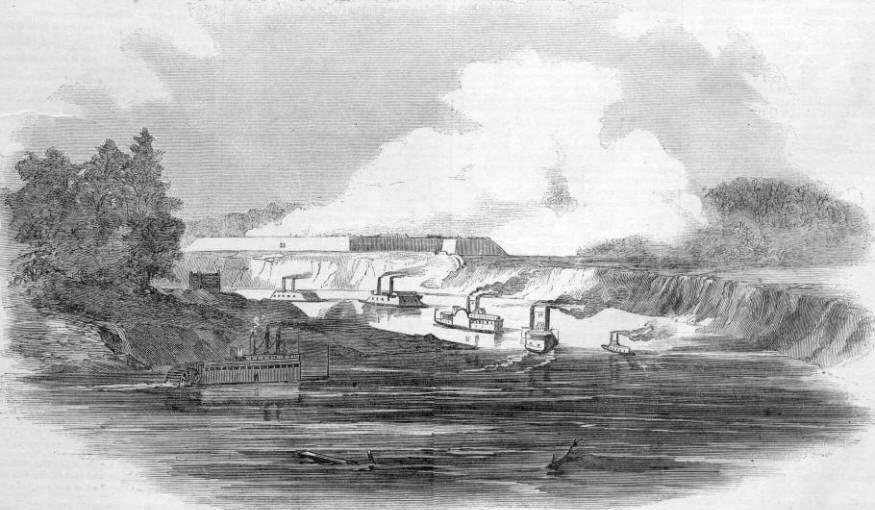
Naval bombardment of Arkansas Post, as depicted in Harper's Weekly in 1863

McClernand's army began moving upriver on January 5. To keep the element of surprise, the Union fleet entered the White River instead of the Arkansas, before using a connecting cutoff between the two rivers to move back into the Arkansas. The infantrymen were moved on transport vessels, with warships in support. Three of the supporting warships were ironclads: USS Baron DeKalb, USS Louisville, and USS Cincinnati. On the afternoon of January 9, Churchill was informed of the approaching Union fleet. Sending out three companies of cavalry as scouts, he ordered his men to defend the outer set of rifle pits, which were still incomplete. Churchill soon modified this order, having the troops man the inner line of rifle pits instead, as it was believed that the Union troops were landing near the outer rifle pits. A force of Texans from Garland's brigade was sent forward as skirmishers, and the six cannons of Hart's battery were positioned on the right flank of the inner line of rifle pits, near the river.

Beginning at 4:00 pm or 5:00 pm on January 9, Sherman's men started offloading from their transports about 3 miles (4.8 km) from Arkansas Post, at Notrebe's plantation. Many of Sherman's troops did not land that evening as their transports did not arrive until it was too dark for disembarkation. Porter learned of the obstructions placed in the river from an individual in a boat in the river who was picked up by the Union troops. Morgan's transports halted at a landing on the opposite side of the river, 9 miles (14 km) downriver from Notrebe's, to offload Colonel Daniel Lindsey's brigade, which was part of Osterhaus's division. On the morning of January 10, Lindsey's troops landed, along with some 10-pounder Parrott rifles from the Chicago Mercantile Battery. These troops used a road to move across the base of the peninsula formed by the curve in the river, and took up a position upstream from the fort to prevent the Confederates from reinforcing the fort via the river. By 11:00 am, Sherman's troops had finished landing.

McClernand and his staff went ashore early on January 10 to conduct a reconnaissance of the river road. At 8:00 that morning, the gunboat USS Black Hawk and the tinclad USS Rattler moved upstream and bombarded the Confederate rifle pits. Churchill ordered Hart's battery to hold its fire, thinking the three heavy guns at the fort could handle the Union vessels, but issues with bad gunpowder prevented the guns in the fort from firing far enough to hit Black Hawk and Rattler. McClernand ordered Sherman to move to the northwest and try to get around the Confederate fort and into its rear, but he later decided that the river road was also a feasible approach route. Steele's division, accompanied by Sherman, began the movement around the fort, guided by escaped slaves, while Stuart's division advanced directly along the river road. At around 1:00 pm, the rest of Morgan's corps landed on the same side of the river as Sherman's men, at a place downriver from Notrebe's known as Muldin's. Steele's flanking column was blocked by swampy ground and a bayou, and the division was withdrawn to rejoin Stuart. The flanking column returned to Notrebe's around the same time that Morgan's corps reached it.

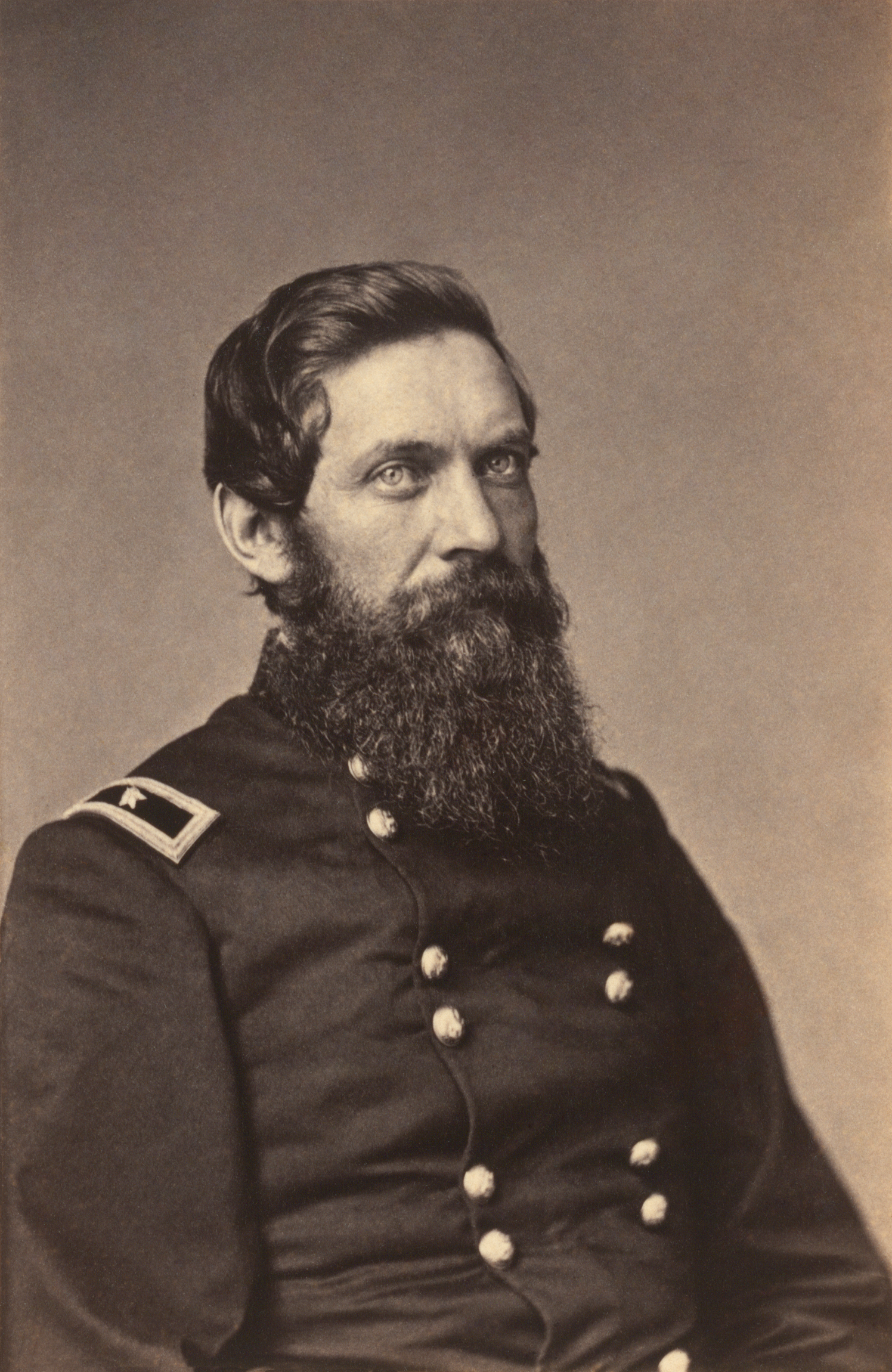
Giles Alexander Smith commanded a Union brigade at Arkansas Post; photograph is circa 1864

Around 2 pm, Churchill learned of Sherman's flanking maneuver and decided to withdraw his forces towards the fort. The Confederate rear guard was formed from the previously deployed skirmishers and a portion of the 10th Texas Infantry Regiment. Colonel Giles Smith's brigade of Stuart's division pushed forward after the Confederates, led by two Missouri regiments as skirmishers. The two Union regiments pushed forward until they came under fire from the fort. After a reconnaissance, Stuart shifted his line to the right, so that it ran 0.75 miles (1.2 km) from the river to the Little Rock road. Two regiments from Colonel T. Kilby Smith's brigade of Stuart's division were sent to support the division's skirmishers; the skirmishers approached the fort and came under heavy fire which resulted in seventeen casualties. The 57th Ohio Infantry Regiment was sent to the right to scout the area around Post Bayou.

Morgan's men advanced with A. J. Smith's division in the front and Osterhaus's to the rear. While Stuart's men shifted right, A. J. Smith's filled in the space to the left by the river. McClernand had told Porter that his men would be ready to attack at 2 pm. At 5:30 pm., McClernand told Porter that his men were ready, and the Union vessels advanced towards the fort to bombard it. The three ironclads moved in to close range and were each assigned one of the heavy Confederate guns. The timberclad Lexington and Black Hawk provided supporting fire. The shooting from the naval vessels killed most of the horses within the Confederate position, but there were few human casualties. The bombardment ceased at around 7:30 pm. Porter tried to slip Rattler upriver to bombard the fort from behind, but the tinclad came under heavy fire and fouled on the obstructions in the river. Damaged, Rattler withdrew back downriver. The Confederate batteries had been silenced, but it was too dark to accomplish anything further and McClernand did not attack. Baron DeKalb suffered seventeen casualties, with another eleven on Louisville.

Churchill was informed by Lieutenant General Theophilus Holmes that he was expected to "hold out till help arrived or all dead". Holmes vacillated and originally denied reinforcements, but then stated that he would send some. On January 9, Churchill had sent a message to the commander of the Confederate garrison at St. Charles requesting reinforcements. This request resulted in a company of Texans reaching Fort Hindman on the night of January 10. Further reinforcements were on their way in the form of nearly 200 men from the 24th Arkansas Infantry Regiment. Churchill made his troop dispositions to receive the expected Union attack. The fort itself was defended by a portion of the 19th Arkansas Infantry Regiment, a battalion of Arkansas infantry, and a detachment of sailors from Pontchartrain, all under the command of Dunnington. The rifle pits from the fort to Post Bayou were defended by the rest of the 19th Arkansas Infantry on the right, then Garland's brigade, and Deshler's on the left. A gap remained between Deshler's line and Post Bayou. The Confederates spent the night strengthening their defenses, and Deshler ordered the razing of huts in front of his line that had previously been used as housing by Confederate troops. Churchill spoke to his men, and told them "gentlemen, the fight will commence in a very short time, and we must win it or die in the ditches". Earlier in the day, McClernand had sent a detachment of Illinois cavalry to scout the Post Bayou area. (Note: The historian Richard L. Kiper states that the scouting party determined that Post Bayou could not easily be crossed, although Kiper notes that Morgan claimed after the battle that he deemed Post Bayou to be easily crossable. The historian Ed Bearss instead states that the scouts reported that Post Bayou was only 18 inches (46 cm) deep, had several good crossings, and that the commander of the scouting party informed Sherman that troops placed on the far side of Post Bayou could enfilade the Confederate rifle pits.) In response to the information from the scouting party, McClernand ordered Steele's division moved from its camp in the Union rear to form on the right of Stuart's line.

=== January 11 ===
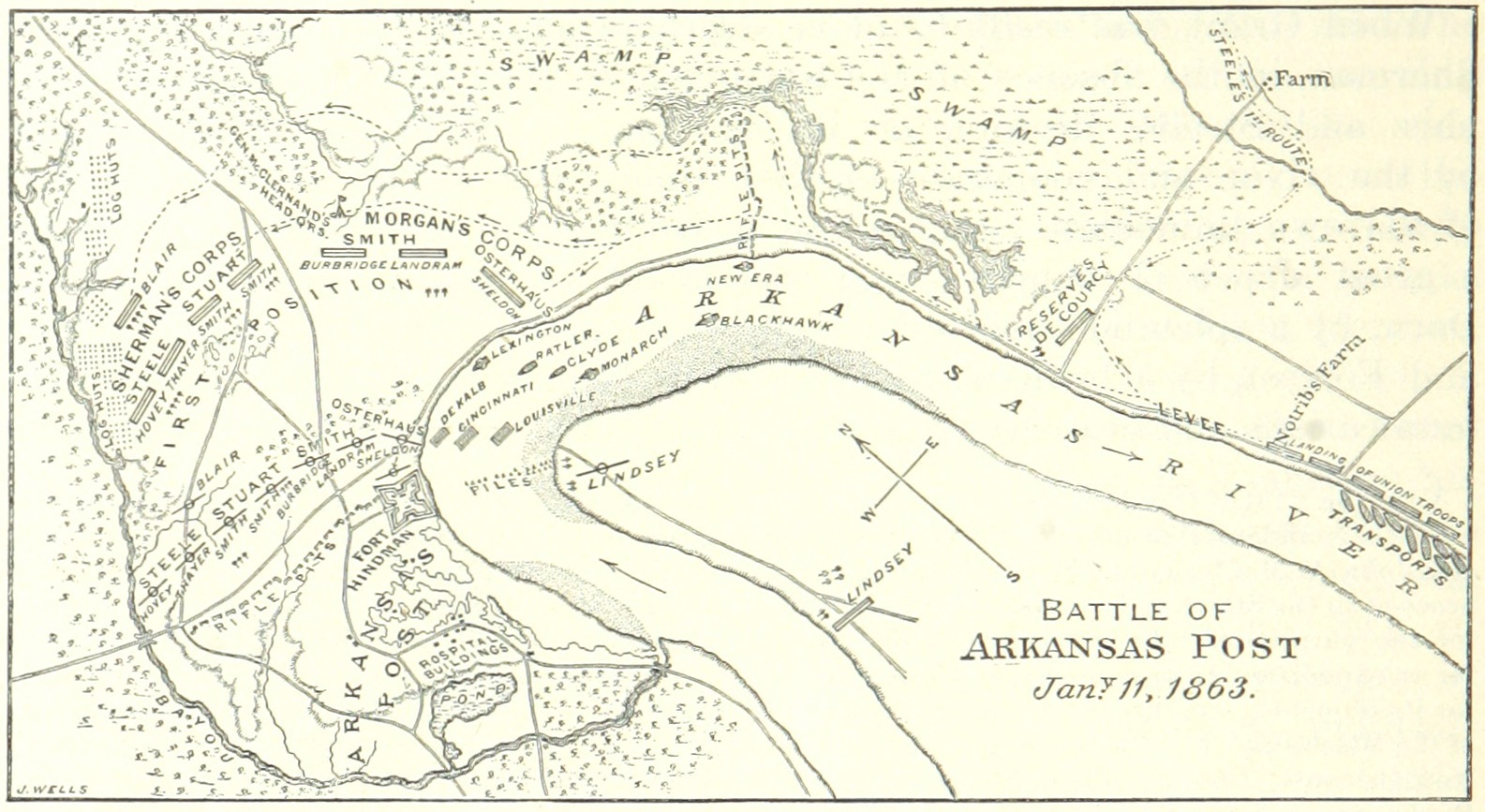
A map of the battle

On the morning of January 11, Steele ordered Brigadier General Charles E. Hovey to advance his brigade. This threatened the gap between Deshler's flank and the bayou, so Deshler drew detachments from all of his regiments and deployed them as a unit of skirmishers in the gap. Churchill ordered about 120 soldiers to guard the line of the bayou from Deshler's left down to the Arkansas River, pulled troops from the right of the rifle pits line to support Deshler, and sent four guns from Hart's battery to Deshler. Further positional adjustments were made by Sherman's corps that morning. One of Steele's brigades, commanded by Brigadier General John M. Thayer, was deployed to the left of Hovey. Brigadier General Francis P. Blair Jr.'s brigade had taken heavy casualties at Chickasaw Bayou and was held in reserve. Stuart advanced Giles Smith's brigade to the left of Thayer's brigade, with T. Kilby Smith's brigade to the rear.

When these dispositions had been made, Sherman informed McClernand that his troops were ready for the assault. However, there were delays while Morgan's lines were established and the navy finished its preparations. A. J. Smith deployed Brigadier General Stephen G. Burbridge's brigade in two lines to the left of Stuart's division, while Colonel William J. Landram's brigade was deployed in three lines to the left and rear of Burbridge. The decision to deploy only one brigade on the front line was necessitated by a lack of space. Between Landram's brigade and the river was the brigade of Colonel Lionel A. Sheldon, from Osterhaus's division. This was the only one of Osterhaus's brigades in line, as one brigade had been left to guard the transports and Lindsey was on the other side of the river. Porter's warships were to open fire on the Confederates as the signal for the attack, which would be followed by a bombardment by Sherman's artillery. Three minutes after Sherman's guns ceased firing, the assault was to begin. When the infantry attack began, the men were ordered to yell loudly, so that the naval vessels would hear the noise and know to shift their fire to prevent friendly fire. At 1 pm, Porter's ships moved towards the fort to again bombard it. Porter had ordered the sides of his ships to be coated in "tallow or slush" to help deflect cannon shots.

The three Union ironclads, supported by Lexington, Rattler, and the tinclad USS Glide, fired from the river, while the Union cannons on land joined in. From across the river, the two guns of the Chicago Mercantile Battery opened fire, along with two 20-pounder Parrott rifles from the 1st Wisconsin Battery that had been sent to join Lindsey the day before. Cincinnati fired 100 shots, Louisville 212, and Baron DeKalb 158, with the fire from Baron DeKalb being the most effective. The fire silenced all of the Confederate guns in the fort except for the one facing away from the river. Porter then sent Rattler, Glide, and the ram USS Monarch upriver past the fort to cut off the Confederates' path of retreat. Monarch was stopped by low water, but the two tinclads continued further and destroyed a ferry. Morgan could observe the progress of the gunboats, while Sherman had to judge by sound. With the Confederates not firing in response to his cannonade, Sherman cut his cannon fire off early and sent his infantry in for the assault. The historian Timothy B. Smith estimates that Sherman's guns only fired for about fifteen minutes, compared to the planned firing time of thirty minutes.

When Hovey's brigade attacked, it came under fire from Confederates on the other side of Post Bayou. To counter this threat, the 17th Missouri Infantry Regiment was aligned along the bayou. Fire from Deshler's Confederates and two 10-pounder Parrott rifles from Hart's battery halted the Union attack until the 76th Ohio Infantry Regiment moved up and drove the Confederate cannon crews off. Hovey suffered an arm wound but remained on the field. To the left, Thayer's brigade was repulsed by the 10th Texas Infantry. Hovey in turn had two regiments attack, but they were also repulsed. Deshler sent a portion of the 19th Arkansas to support the Texans, but a gap still remained between the Texans and the Arkansans. The transfer of the portion of the 19th Arkansas required Garland to stretch his line to fill the space formerly occupied by the Arkansans. Two further attacks by the two regiments Hovey had deployed were repulsed. In Stuart's sector, Giles Smith's brigade came under heavy enfilade fire from Hart's battery, and men crawled forward to a wooded position to fire into the battery and silence it. T. Kilby Smith's brigade aligned on Giles Smith's left and two artillery batteries were brought forward. The two brigades were then held in preparation for a general storming of the Confederate position. To counter the attacks against his line, Deshler requested reinforcements, and was granted parts of three Texas cavalry units from Garland's brigade, as Garland's line had not been seriously tested yet.

Across the Little Rock road, Morgan's corps began its advance, as the Union assault opened brigade by brigade from right to left. Burbridge's brigade moved first. Confederate soldiers fired upon the brigade from a group of huts, but were driven off. The brigade's attack came to a halt 200 yards (180 m) from the Confederate line. Landram's brigade was brought up in support, and the two brigades fought Garland's men for an hour and a half. After this, at 3 pm, Osterhaus sent Sheldon's brigade into the fray, and the Confederate defenders were driven from the parapet of the fort. The 120th Ohio Infantry Regiment attempted to storm the fort, but became pinned down in a ravine by Confederate fire, where it remained for an hour.

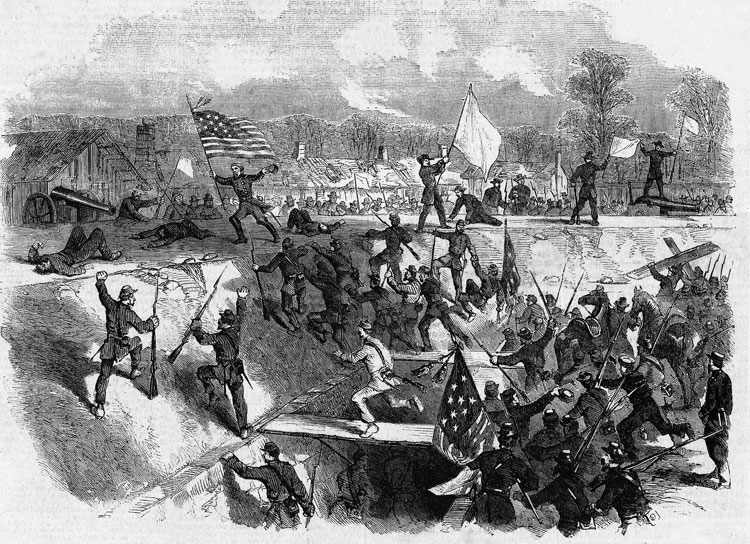
Brigadier General Stephen G. Burbridge planting the Union flag after the capture of the post. The drawing was made by an embedded illustrator accompanying Burbridge's staff.

The Confederates had repulsed all of the Union assaults to this point, and nightfall was approaching. The 24th Arkansas Infantry had arrived, but the Confederates had received no other reinforcements. At around 4:30 pm, white flags of surrender began to fly from the fort. The Union troops were preparing for a final assault at this time. Garland noticed white flags flying among his troops, and heard rumors that Churchill had ordered the surrender, but Garland did not believe them. Morgan noted that at various times, white flags were raised and then suppressed along the Confederate lines, resulting in significant battlefield confusion. The historian Timothy B. Smith suggests that it is possible that fire from Porter's ships and Lindsey's artillery striking the rear of the Confederate lines prompted the raising of the surrender flags. Some of Morgan's troops advanced towards the Confederate lines, seeing the flags of surrender, but were fired on by Confederate troops who had not surrendered. Churchill denied ordering a capitulation.

As the white flags continued to fly, Union troops moved forward and mingled in the rifle pits with Garland's troops. Seeing the white flags, Sherman ordered Steele to stop fighting and moved to the Confederate position, where he ordered Garland to have his brigade stack arms. In turn, A. J. Smith had Burbridge advance to the fort to personally plant a flag. Confederate soldiers insisted to Burbridge that the fort had not surrendered, but Burbridge pointed out the white flags to them. Burbridge met with Churchill and Dunnington, who agreed that surrender was the only practical course of action for the Confederates. Churchill personally surrendered to McClernand. Dunnington, as a former naval officer, would only surrender to Porter. Deshler did not believe a surrender had occurred, and interpreted the white flags as faded company flags. His men kept fighting until Union troops presented a flag of truce. During the truce, Deshler informed Steele that he intended to keep fighting. Steele informed Sherman of this development, who sent Churchill to talk with Deshler. Eventually, Deshler agreed to surrender after Sherman pointed out that his line had been swamped with Union soldiers.

== Aftermath ==
When the surrender was completed, 4,791 Confederates had been captured. Confederate casualty records are incomplete, but a breakdown of casualties provided by the historian Ed Bearss indicates sixty killed, seventy-three wounded, and eighty missing. Richard L. Kiper has Confederate losses at sixty killed and between seventy-five and eighty wounded in addition to those captured. Michael B. Ballard places Confederate battle losses as sixty killed and eighty wounded. McClernand reported capturing 17 cannons, 3,000 stands of infantry weapons, and additional equipment. The men lost at Arkansas Post amounted to about a third or fourth of the Confederate soldiers then in Arkansas. Additionally, seven Confederate cannons were destroyed during the battle. A few hundred men managed to escape back to Holmes. Union losses were 1,092 men. McClernand's force had suffered 1,061 casualties, and Porter's 31; the breakdown of McClernand's casualties were 134 killed, 898 wounded, and 29 missing. The majority of these casualties were suffered by the brigades of Burbridge and Hovey. Burbridge's brigade alone took 349 casualties. Some of the materials lost with Blue Wing were recaptured. Sherman later wrote in his memoirs that McClernand said "Glorious! Glorious! My star is ever in the ascendant! I'll make a splendid report. I had a man up a tree." The Governor of Illinois Richard Yates sent a letter congratulating McClernand on the victory and McClernand was commended by Lincoln. On the other hand, Porter wrote a misleading letter to Assistant Secretary of the Navy Gustavus Fox criticizing McClernand and stating that Sherman should have remained in command. Sherman still considered being superseded by McClernand to be an insult intended by Lincoln.

Of the reinforcements sent by Holmes to relieve Arkansas Post, one brigade learned of the fall of the fort when it reached Brownsville, while Major General John G. Walker's Texas Division was 25 miles (40 km) from the fort when it learned Churchill had surrendered the day before. On January 12, McClernand ordered the remains of the Confederate fort be destroyed. When Grant learned of McClernand's expedition to Arkansas Post, he became angry and wrote to Halleck on January 11, describing the movement as a "wild-goose chase"; he believed the operation diverted troops away on a movement of questionable utility. That same day, Grant ordered McClernand back to the Vicksburg area. On January 12, Halleck gave Grant permission to relieve McClernand and take personal command of the operations against Vicksburg. Also on January 12, McClernand's Army of the Mississippi ceased to exist, and Sherman's corps became the XV Corps of the Army of the Tennessee; Morgan's corps became XIII Corps of that army two days later. The delay in renaming XIII Corps was due to the order for the corps' renaming reaching Sherman but not McClernand. Sherman had renamed XV Corps without consulting McClernand, which Kiper believes was a deliberate attempt at offense.

On January 14, in a meeting with Sherman and Porter, McClernand proposed moving up the Arkansas River and striking against the Confederate force at Brownsville. However, McClernand developed doubts about the feasibility of this plan, as the water level in the Arkansas River was falling. That same day, McClernand received Grant's order to return with his troops to the Mississippi River. McClernand's two corps reached Napoleon on January 16, traveling through bad winter weather. Grant also traveled to Napoleon, where he met with Porter and Sherman on January 18. Grant sent McClernand and his troops further down the Mississippi River, while he returned to Memphis. Porter and Sherman were able to convince Grant of the military value of the Arkansas Post expedition. Grant later noted that the Confederate force at Arkansas Post could have proved problematic if left untended. On January 26, Grant moved downriver to the Vicksburg area, where he joined McClernand's camp. A spat between Grant and McClernand broke out on January 30, after Grant issued orders changing the position of one of McClernand's units. McClernand responded with an insubordinate letter. That day, Grant used his authorization from Halleck to relieve McClernand from command of the operations against Vicksburg and took command of the campaign. McClernand became the commander of XIII Corps the next day.

After a series of canal- and bayou-related operations failed, Grant was faced with a choice between three options: a direct amphibious assault against Vicksburg from across the Mississippi River, a withdrawal to Memphis in preparation for another overland campaign, and to move further down the Mississippi River and cross the river below Vicksburg. Grant chose the latter option. He wanted to cross his army at Grand Gulf, Mississippi, but on April 29, Porter's warships were unable to silence Confederate batteries there in the Battle of Grand Gulf. Grant instead crossed his army further downriver at Bruinsburg, Mississippi, on April 30 and May 1. Grant's troops won the Battle of Port Gibson on May 1, the Battle of Raymond on May 12, and the Battle of Jackson on May 14. Confederate Lieutenant General John C. Pemberton's army was badly mauled by Grant's at the Battle of Champion Hill on May 16, and Grant won another victory at the Battle of Big Black River Bridge the next day. The Confederates withdrew into the defenses of Vicksburg, and repulsed Union assaults on May 19 and 22. After the failure of these assaults, Grant's army began siege operations against the city. Running low on supplies, Pemberton surrendered his army on July 4. The fall of the city marked one of the key events of the war.

Part of the Arkansas Post battlefield is located within the Arkansas Post National Memorial, although 360 acres (150 ha) have been submerged due to river course changes and the construction of the Arkansas Post Canal. The remains of the fort were washed away by the river as early as 1880.

== See also ==
- Arkansas in the American Civil War
- List of American Civil War battles
- Trans-Mississippi Theater of the American Civil War
- Troop engagements of the American Civil War, 1863
