= Thomas B. Huger =

American Confederate States Navy Officer

First Lieutenant Thomas B. Huger, CSN

Thomas B. Huger (died April 25, 1862) was an officer in the Confederate States Navy during the U.S. Civil War. Before the war, he had served for over 20 years in the United States Navy.

== Biography ==
Huger was born in South Carolina. He joined the U.S. Navy as a midshipman in March 1835. In 1845 he married Mariamne Williams Meade, the daughter of merchant Richard W. Meade and sister of Civil War general George Meade; she died in 1857. Huger was promoted to the rank of Lieutenant in February 1848 and continued in the service until his native state seceded from the United States. Resigning his commission in the U.S. Navy in January 1861, he became a First Lieutenant in the Confederate Navy the following March.

He commanded a battery on Morris Island, South Carolina in 1861 and was appointed as commanding officer of the gunboat CSS McRae later in that year. Huger's ship operated in defense of New Orleans, Louisiana and the lower Mississippi River.

On April 24, 1862, while battling Federal Navy ships near Fort Jackson and Fort St. Philip, McRae was badly damaged and Lieutenant Huger was mortally wounded. He died the next day.

Huger was wounded while engaged in fighting the Iroquois—a ship on which he served while in the US Navy. After he was wounded, his former shipmates recognized him and raised their caps as a token of respect. After his wounding, he was brought back to Charleston, South Carolina. On his death bed, he was informed that a US Navy officer wanted to see him. Huger responded, “Let him come in; I have no enemies now.” When Huger learned the officer’s name and the fact that he was a Southerner fighting for the Union, Huger declined to see him. Union Navy officers attended his funeral.^1
