= 55th Tennessee Infantry Regiment =

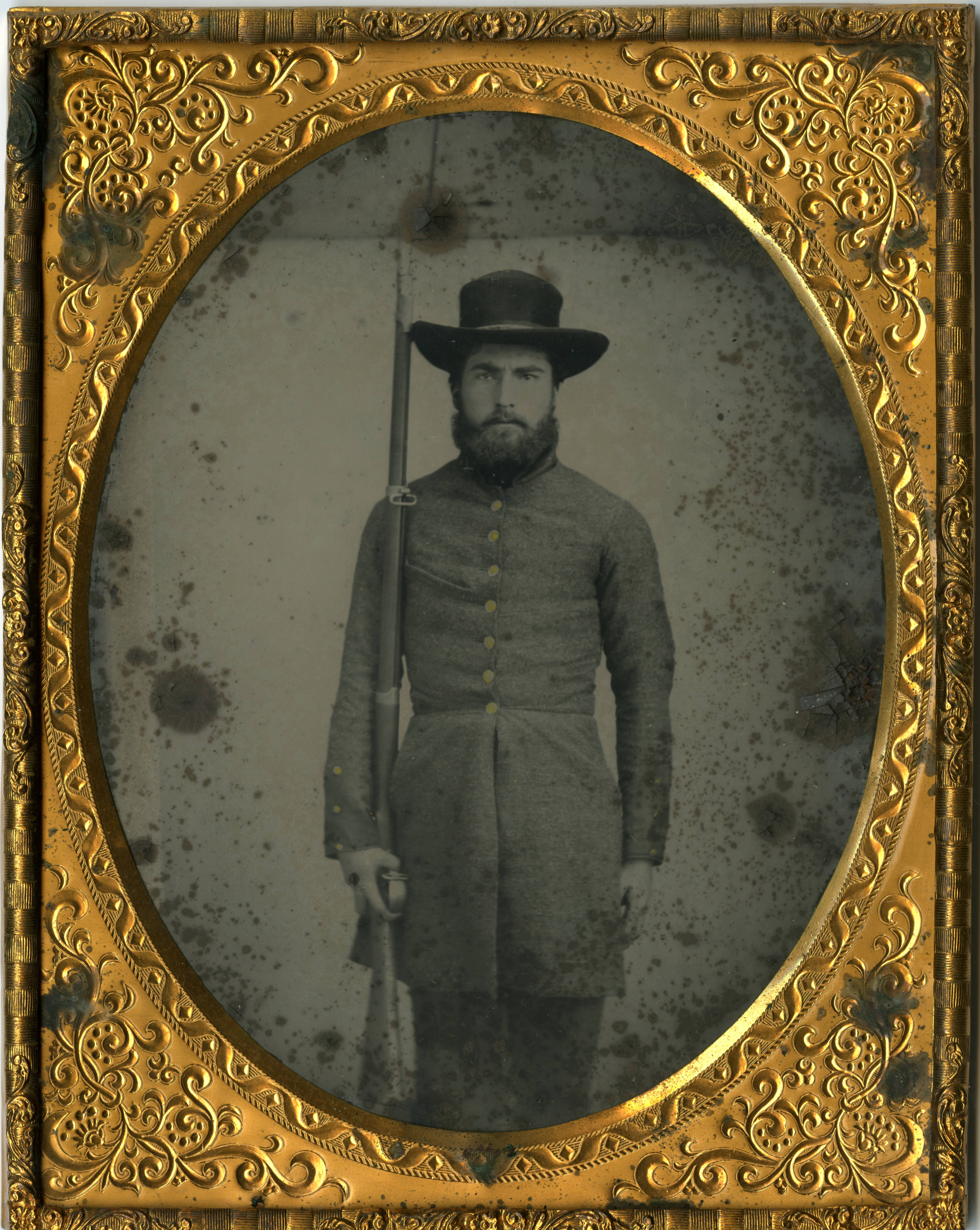
Tintype of Nathan Nesbitt, Co. H, 55th Tennessee Infantry

The 55th Regiment, Tennessee Infantry was an infantry regiment from Tennessee that served with the Confederate States Army in the American Civil War. Notable battles that the regiment was involved in include the Battle of Shiloh.

== See also ==
- List of Tennessee Confederate Civil War units
