= CSS Owl =

American Civil War vessel

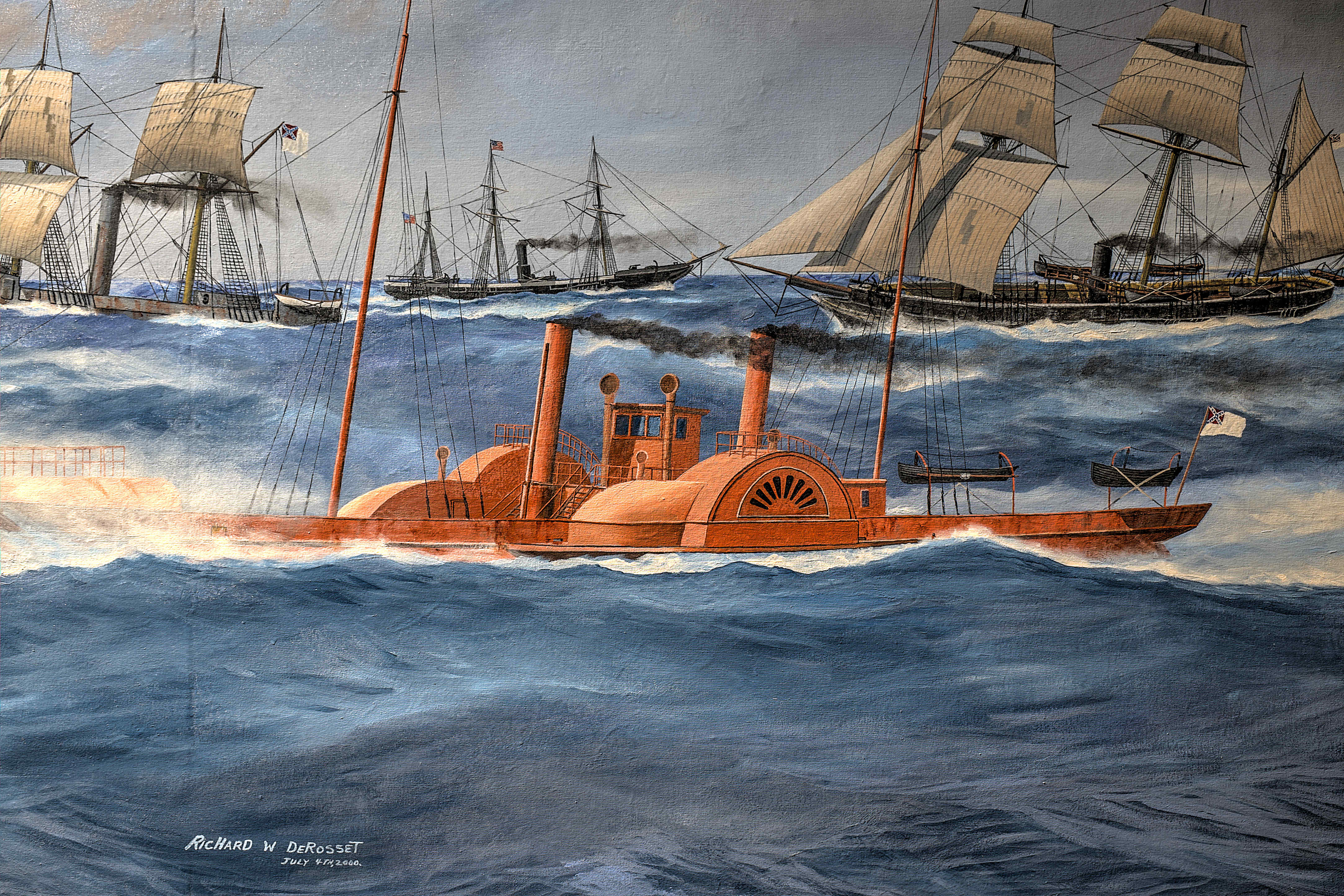
- CSS Owl.

History

Confederate States
- Name: Owl
- Launched: June 21, 1864
- Commissioned: 1864
- Decommissioned: 1865
- Fate: Delivered to British agents in Liverpool

General characteristics
- Displacement: 771 tons
- Length: 230 ft (70 m)
- Beam: 26 ft (7.9 m)
- Draft: 7 ft 6 in (2.29 m)
- Propulsion: 180hp oscillating engines and feathering wheels by Laird Bros
- Speed: 14–16 knots

CSS Owl was a blockade runner in the Confederate States Navy during the American Civil War. It was built by Jones Quiggen, a ship builder in Liverpool, England and launched on June 21, 1864.

Owl, sister to CSS Bat, was more fortunate than her twin which followed her closely. Owl succeeded in running into Wilmington, North Carolina sometime in September 1864, although United States Consul Mortimer Melville Jackson telegraphed Washington, D.C. that Owl had "a large, valuable cargo" cleared August 31—officially for Nassau, Bahamas. She escaped to sea from Wilmington on October 3; her masts were visible all the while she lay in port loading. The blockaders wounded her captain and several crewmen, but 9 shots failed to stop Owl.

She was now commanded by Commander John Newland Maffitt, CSN—the "Prince of Privateers"—detached from CSS Albemarle at Plymouth, North Carolina on or about September 9. Confederate Navy Secretary Stephen Mallory, telegraphing on September 19, warned Maffitt: "It is of the first importance that our steamers should not fall into the enemy's hands… these vessels, lightly armed, now constitute the fleetest and most efficient part of his blockading force off Wilmington." Maffitt was to take no passengers, as a rule, and Assistant Paymaster Adam Tredwell, CSN, would deliver "5,000 pounds in sterling bills before sailing," Mallory concluded.

Owl was at Bermuda with cotton October 24–29, as the U.S. Consul faithfully reported. On December 5, Mallory instructed Maffitt to pick up CSS Florida's men in Bermuda. A letter to Mallory captured, along with Assistant Paymaster Talley, CSN, by USS Forest Rose on May 7, 1865, bears an endorsement by her commander, Lieutenant A. N. Gould, USN: "It shows that Maffitt has been landing on the Florida coast with the Owl." U.S. Consul William Thomas Minor at Havana, Cuba reported on May 20 that Maffitt was to leave there in a day or two for Galveston, Texas. On this last trip Owl was almost captured at Wilmington by a Federal cruiser and had to jettison valuable mail as well as sustain 12 casualties. Maffitt then tried Galveston, and grounded on Bird Island Shoals at the entrance within range of 16 enemy cruisers. Captain James H. MacGarvey, CSN, in little CSS Diana got Owl off barely in time; she not only ran into port but ran out safely too. There is some evidence Owl's last two runs through the blockade were made under the name of Foam.

Owl was delivered to Fraser, Trenholm & Co. in Liverpool after war's end, and Maffitt took the Board of Trade examinations to command British merchant ships to South America.
