= 4th Arkansas Infantry Battalion =

- Active: 1861–1862
- Disbanded: December 21, 1862
- Country: Confederate States of America
- Allegiance: Confederate States Army
- Branch: Infantry
- Size: battalion
- Engagements: American Civil War: Battle of Island No. 10; Battle of Farmington; Kentucky Campaign; Battle of Richmond; Battle of Murfreesboro; Battle of Jackson
- Battle honors: Confederate Roll of Honor: Four soldiers for the Battle of Murfreesboro

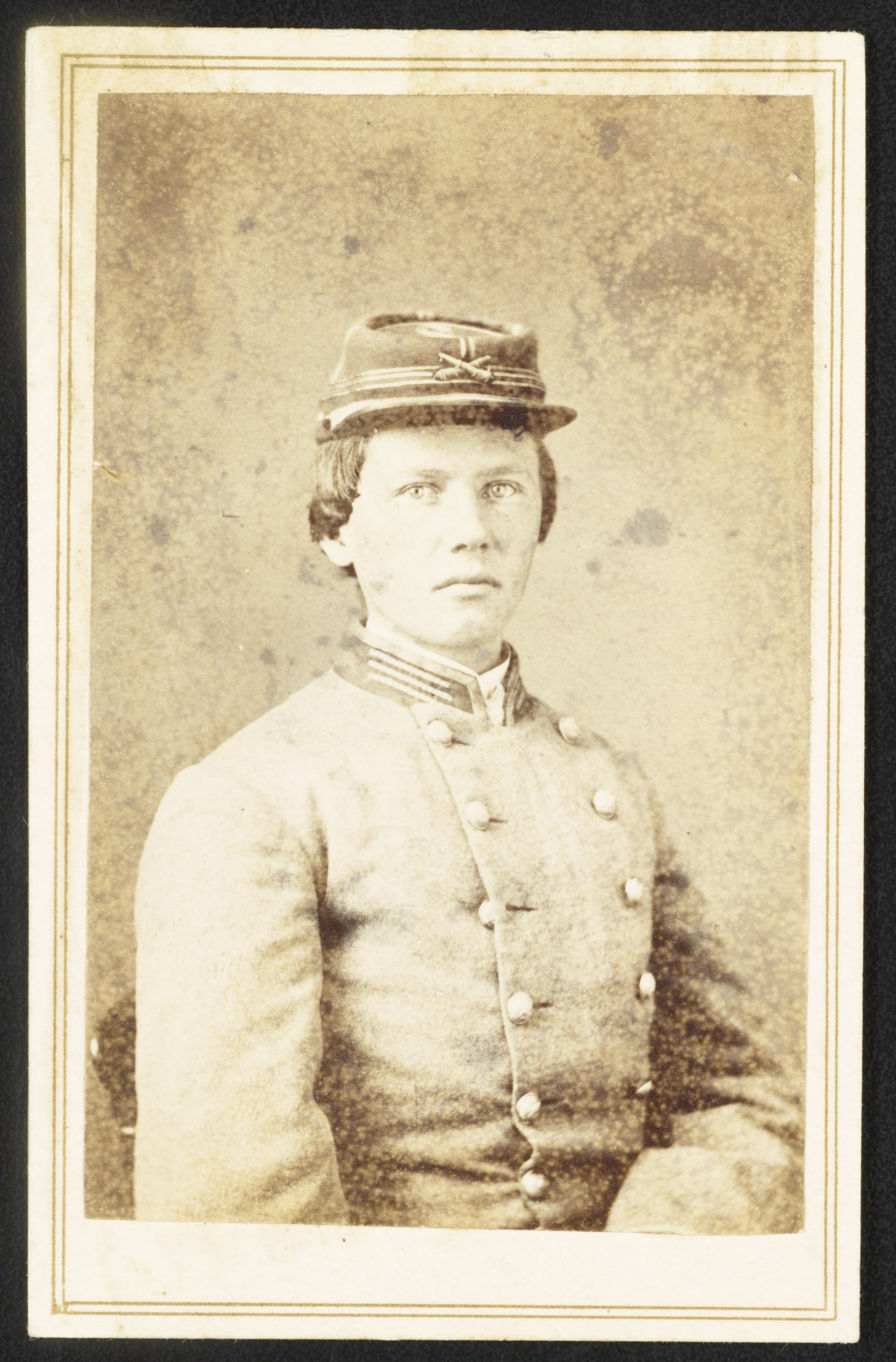
Capt. William Pratt Parks of Co. D, 4th Arkansas Infantry

The 4th Battalion, Arkansas Infantry was an infantry Battalion of the Confederate States Army during the American Civil War. The battalion served in the same brigade and was later consolidated with the 4th Arkansas Infantry Regiment, but units began as completely separate and unrelated organizations.

== Organization ==
4th Infantry Battalion was organized at Little Rock, Arkansas, on November 10, 1861, with five companies, from Clark, Prairie, Pulaski and White counties. The battalion was composed of the following companies:.

- Company A, the "Bayou Metre Hornets", later renamed the "Turnbull Guards" from Pulaski County, commanded by Captain Thomas F. Murff.
- Company B, the "McKeever Guards", from Prairie County, commanded by Captain Thomas J. Payne.
- Company C, from Clark County, commanded by Captain Samuel O. Cloud.
- Company D, The "Magruder Guards", from Pulaski County, commanded by Captain F. W. Hoardly. This unit was detached to the Artillery during the engagement at Island No. 10 and became Company H, 1st Tennessee Heavy Artillery.
- Company E, from White County, commanded by Captain J. M. Moore.

Lieutenant Colonel Francis A. Terry, and Majors John McKay and Jesse A. Ross were in command.

On the 18th of October, 1861, a grand barbecue was held at the residence of Eylas Beals to honor Capt. Murff's company, the Bayou Metre Hornets. The company was presented with a flag by Mrs. J. R. R. Adams at this event. Mrs. Adams made the following speech at the flag presentation:

Captain Murff—

In respect to you and your gallant soldiers, and in behalf of the married ladies here assembled, I present to you this silken flag. It is emblematic of that flag which is now struggling so hard to wave in freedom over our shores. You will perceive upon it inscribed the words, "Conquer we must, In God is our trust." We have placed these simple, but beautiful words there, hoping that they may remind you, when you re far away, of the great necessity of placing all your trust on Him who knoweth all things, and who doeth all things well. His ever watchful eye will beam with love upon you; he will be your solace and hope in the hour of need; your light and comfort in the dark night of trouble. That God who has promised mercy to the shorn lamb will never forsake you if you will love him, obey him, and reverence his holy name. Ask of him, then, to smile upon you in this most glorious undertaking; place yourselves under his heavenly protection, and then, valiant warriors, rally forth in the defence of your country, your homes and your firesides, and say with confidence, and with cheerful hearts, "Oh, conquer we must, for our cause is just; See, there is our motto, in God is our trust." This was the chosen motto of your honored, illustrious Washington. Under it he led forth the gallant heroes of the revolution; under it your forefathers fought and died, and thereby purchased for us those blessings, of liberty, freedom and peace, which once were ours, and which shall be ours again. You are now about to leave your friends, your homes and your loved ones here, for the tented field, to battle in your country's cause; and I sincerely trust that this flag may be a pillar of light by day to shield and protect you, and as a pillar of fire by night to lead you on to victory and success. Think not that you will be forgotten by those you are leaving behind. Oh, no, brave soldiers, our thoughts will follow after you, and, in spirit, we will wander with you far over the beautiful hills and pleasant valleys of our own dear sunny South, and we will bless our weary soldiers; and from our hearts will ascend to heaven a silent and a fervent prayer that the God of battles will be with you; that he will shield and comfort you, and return you all again, crowned with honors, to the homes and friends from which you are now parting. Then take this flag, and have it carried in triumph until peace shall be restored to our beloved country, and until our independence shall be recognized by all the great nations of the earth. (Advancing and placing the staff in Captain Murff's hand, continued,)

Our fingers have made for brothers and sons,
I give it to you now in trust,
That you never will leave it while sabres and guns
Can save it from trailing in dust.

Bright banner of beauty in glory unfurl,
On continent, ocean and sea,
To nations and kingdoms throughout the wide world;
Go, flag of the brave and the free.

May laurel on laurel around thee entwine,
And still they dominion be peace,
Whilst the stars in thy circle forever shall shine,
And God's blessings on thee increase.

Capt. Murff's Reply:

Mrs. Adams:

In accepting at your hands, in behalf of the "Bayou Metre Hornets," this beautiful banner, wrought by the fair hands of a lady of this vicinity, I feel my utter inability to respond in that strain of fervid eloquence which swells up from my heart, but fails to find utterance from my lips. From every point the invader is assailing us; the roll of the drum is now a familiar sound, and wakes the echoes in places forever strange to it before; the earth is trembling beneath the tramp of marching squadrons; the roar of the cannon; the crash of the musketry, the groans of the wounded and dying are familiar sounds. We may be conquered but never subdued; this beautiful banner shall wave over us while one arm has strength to strike a foe; though smoke and dust and blood may stain it, but dishonor shall never tarnish it.

Accept, then, fair lady, our thanks for this high testimonial of your estimation of our company, and receive from me, in behalf of the company, this pledge, that till the last arm has fallen nerveless, and the last heart has ceased to beat, will it become a trophy to our enemies.

== Battles ==
The battalion was assigned to the defenses of Columbus, Kentucky, then to Island No. 10. Captain Frederick William Hoadley's Company D was detached at Island No. 10, given charge of a battery of heavy guns and reorganized as Company H, 1st Tennessee Heavy Artillery. Company D was captured at the fall of Island No. 10 on Apr. 6-7, 1862, and exchanged later that summer, where they manned the water batteries at Vicksburg with the rest of the 10th Tennessee Artillery, and were surrendered again with the Vicksburg garrison after the siege of that place.

The remainder of the battalion was stationed at Tiptonville at the time of the surrender of Island No. 10 and managed to escape by wading through the river's overflow to the transport Jeff Davis, on which they floated in the dark down to Fort Pillow, TN. Writing from the units station at Corinth Mississippi, on May 11, 1862, Captain T. J. Payne, of Company B, wrote home describing the units condition:

All Rolls, Clothing Book and all papers necessary to show the accounts current lost unavoidably. My trunk was left with a citizen and may yet be recovered at some distant day. Some of the company have drawn their full allowance of clothing for six months, others comparatively none. Some data as to deaths &c may be obtained from letters addressed to the relatives of those who died when I return home.

The battalion was then sent to Fort Pillow, Tennessee, until after the Battle of Shiloh, when it was sent to Corinth, Mississippi, and became part Brigadier General Evander McNair's brigade of the Confederate Army of Tennessee. At Corinth, the battalion was reorganized under Maj. T.F. Murff, and participated in the Corinth Campaign from April through June of that year. McNair's brigade included the following Arkansas units, the 1st and 2nd Arkansas Mounted Rifles (dismounted), 4th and 13th Arkansas Infantry Regiments, 4th Arkansas Infantry Battalion, and Humphreys' battery of artillery. The battalion's stations as reported on the muster rolls were as follows:

31 Dec 1861 – Columbus, Kentucky.
28 Feb 1862 – Corinth, Mississippi.
30 Apr 1862 – Camp Priceville, near Tupelo, Mississippi.
30 Jun 1862 – Near Chattanooga, Tennessee.
31 Aug 1862 – Loudon, Tennessee.
31 Oct 1862 – Loudon, Tennessee.
31 Dec 1862 – Shelbyville, Tennessee.
28 Feb 1863 – Shelbyville, Tennessee.
30 Apr 1863 – Shelbyville, Tennessee.
30 Jun 1863 – Camp in the Field, near Livingston, Mississippi.
31 Aug 1863 – Meridian, Mississippi.
31 Oct 1863 – Brandon, Mississippi.

During the Kentucky Campaign, McNair's brigade was assigned to Churchill's division, under the overall command of General Kirby Smith. General Smith pushed rapidly into the bluegrass region of Kentucky, and defeated the Union army at the Battle of Richmond. In the desperate battle that occurred there, McNair's brigade turned the enemy's right and contributed to the rout that followed.

The 4th Arkansas Battalion and 4th Arkansas Regiment operated together until after the Battle of Murfreesboro, Tennessee, on December 21, 1862, when the battalion, severely understrength because of battle losses, was consolidated into the 4th Arkansas Regiment. During the Battle of Murfreesboro, McNair's brigade took part in the brilliant charge of McCown's division, which, aided by the Divisions of Withers and Cheatham, drove the Federal right a distance of between three and four miles, bending it back upon the center, until the line was at right angles to its original position. In accordance with Confederate Adjutant and Inspector General's Office Order Number 131, four soldiers of the battalion were recognized for courage and good conduct on the field for the Battle of Murfreesboro.

General Orders, No. 131, Adjutant-General's Office, Richmond, Va.
Roll of Honor, Murfreesboro, December 31, 1862
Fourth Arkansas Battalion

Private James Vines, Co. A (killed).
Corporal L. Heggie, Co. B (killed).
Private George W. Ayler, Co. C.
Private C. G. Warren, Co. E.

== Consolidation ==
By late August 1863, losses had forced the consolidation of the 4th Arkansas with other depleted Arkansas regiments. The 4th was consolidated with the remnants of the 31st Arkansas Infantry Regiment and the 4th Arkansas Infantry Battalion. The survivors of the battalion served in the 4th Arkansas Infantry Regiment to the end of the war. Companies C and D of the 4th Arkansas formed one company, under the company of Captain Coatney. Companies F; G; H; and I of the same regiment into one company, under the command of Captain Lavender. All companies of the 31st were consolidated into two companies. Colonel H.G. Bunn, of the 4th Arkansas commanded the consolidated regiment.

The 4th Arkansas Infantry Battalion took part in the following battles as a separate command prior to its formal consolidation with the 4th Arkansas Infantry Regiment:

- Battle of Island No. 10, April 6–7, 1862.
- Battle of Farmington, Mississippi, May 9, 1862
- Battle of Richmond, Kentucky, August 29–30, 1862
- Battle of Murfreesboro, Tennessee, December 31, 1862, to January 3, 1863
- Battle of Jackson, Mississippi, July 10, 1863.

== See also ==
- List of Confederate units from Arkansas

== Bibliography ==
- Dedmondt, Glenn "The Flags Of Civil War Arkansas", (Pelican Publishing Co., 2009). ISBN 978-1-58980-190-5.
- Gammage, Washington L., The Camp, the Bivouac, and the Battlefield, Being a History of the Fourth Arkansas Regiment, from its First Organization Down to the Present Date.
- Lavender, Captain John W. 1837-1921. The War Memoirs of Captain John W. Lavender, CSA The Southern Press, 1956. Sub title:
- Lavender, John. They Never Came Back: The Story of Co. F. Fourth Arkansas Infantry, C.S.A. (Pine Bluff, AR: The Southern Press, 1956).
- Reynolds, Daniel Harris and Bender, Robert P., Worthy of the Cause for Which They Fight: The Civil War Diary of Brigadier General Harris Reynolds, 1861-1865. (University of Arkansas Press, 2011), accessed at Google eBooks, https://books.google.com/books?id=H10SkwjYznkC&dq=Reynolds+arkansas+brigade ISBN 978-1-55728-971-1.
