= Point Pleasant, Missouri =

Community in Missouri, USA

Coordinates: 36°27′09″N 89°34′28″W

Point Pleasant is an unincorporated community in New Madrid County, Missouri, United States.

== History ==
The first settlement at Point Pleasant was made in 1815. The town site was platted in 1846, and so named on account of its scenic location. A post office called Point Pleasant was established in 1845, and remained in operation until 1979.

At the turn of the 20th century, Point Pleasant contained a cotton gin and a saw mill.
