= The Arkansas Historical Quarterly =

- Discipline: History
- Language: English
- Edited by: Patrick G. Williams

Publication details
- History: 1942-present
- Publisher: Arkansas Historical Association (United States)
- Frequency: Quarterly

Standard abbreviations
- ISO 4: Ark. Hist. Q.

Indexing
- ISSN: 0004-1823
- LCCN: 44050682
- JSTOR: 00041823
- OCLC no.: 60621130

Links
- Journal homepage

The Arkansas Historical Quarterly is the scholarly journal of the Arkansas Historical Association. It publishes articles on the history of Arkansas and is currently edited by Patrick G. Williams (University of Arkansas at Fayetteville).

== History ==
At the initial founding of the Arkansas Historical Association in February 1941, the first task of the society was to begin publication of a journal, financed by a membership fee of $3, on the state's history. D.Y. Thomas was chosen to be the first editor. After securing funds via membership fees, the first issue of the Quarterly was published in March 1942.
