= Island Number Ten =

Island in Mississippi River

Coordinates: 36°26′53.82″N 89°28′05.80″W

Island Number Ten

Island Number Ten was an island in the Mississippi River near Tiptonville, Tennessee, and the site of a major eponymous battle in the American Civil War.

== History ==
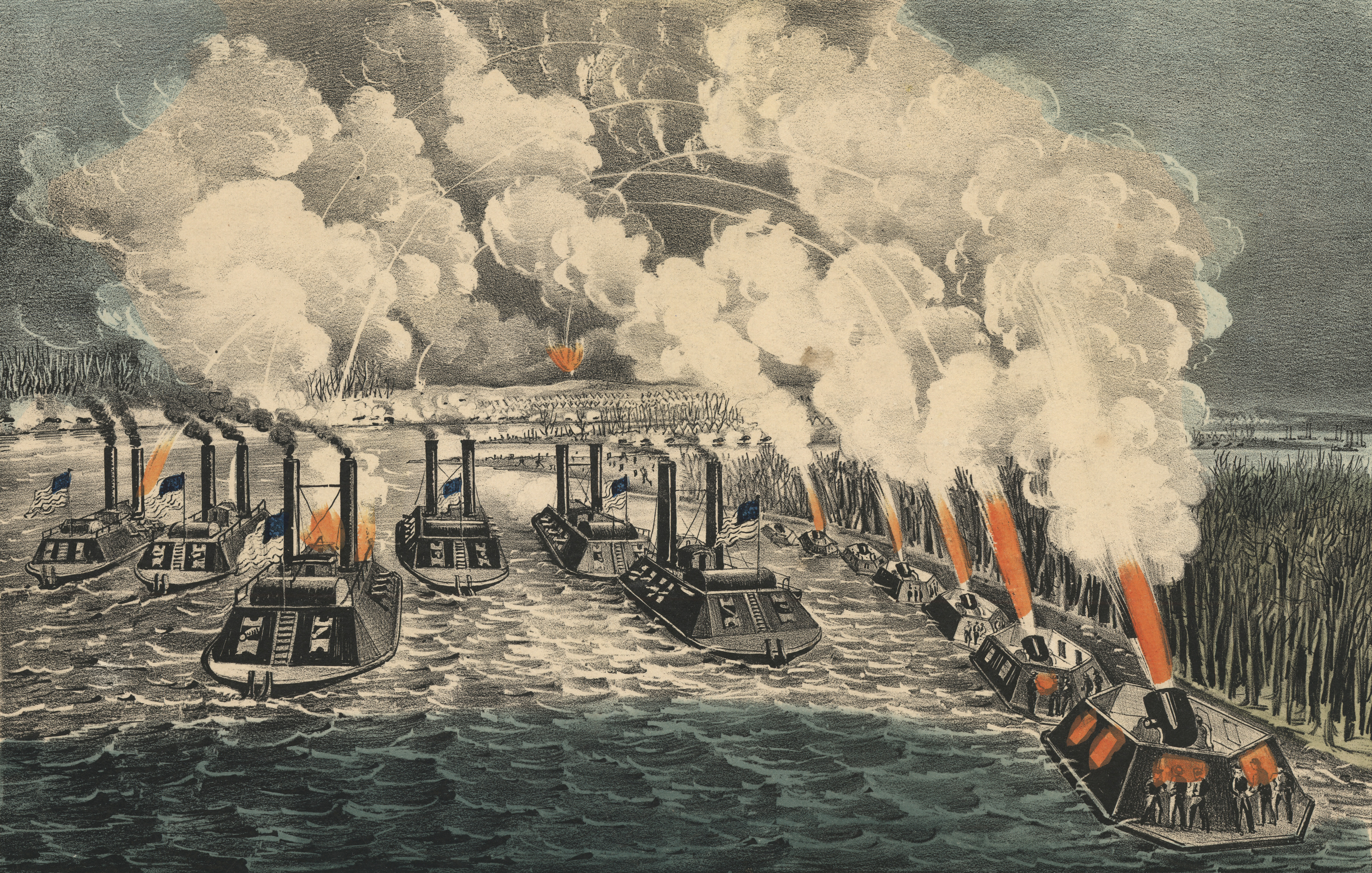
Union Army ironclads in 1862 action in art, "Bombardment of Island 'Number Ten' in the Mississippi River."

In the mid-19th century the United States government began to adopt a uniform numbering plan for islands in the Lower Mississippi River (that part of the river below its confluence with the Ohio River near Cairo, Illinois). This system assigned each major island a number, which increased in the downstream direction. The purpose of this system was to create a level of certainty in documents describing islands in the river as to exactly which island was meant. To a large extent, however, the system had an unintended, and at times almost reverse effect. The numbering system was based on the premise that the islands were relatively permanent, static features when in fact the opposite is true. Due to erosion and accretion, the islands in the lower Mississippi are in a constant state of flux, ever growing, shrinking, and at times disappearing entirely, particularly after major floods.

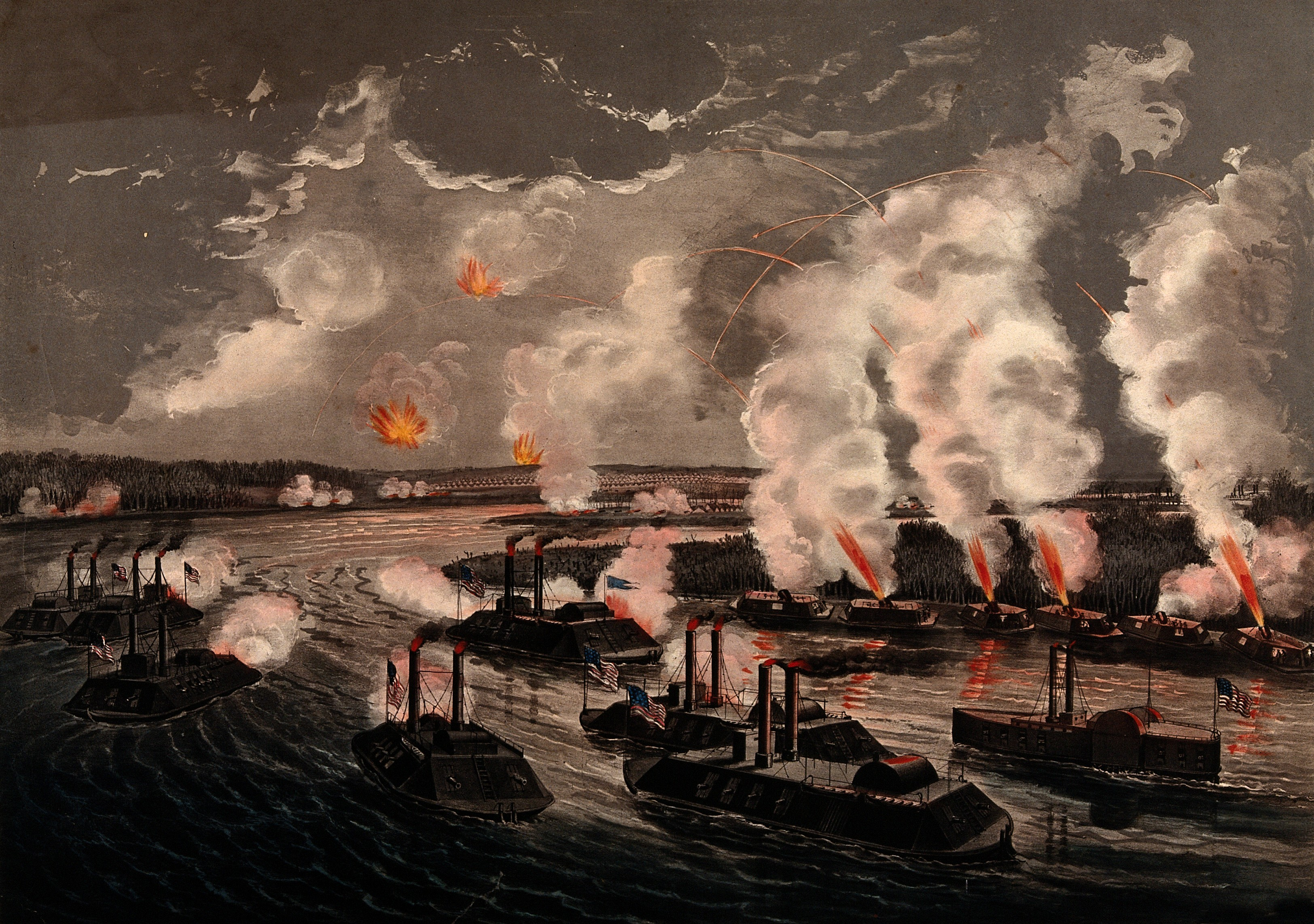
The bombardment and capture of Island 'Number Ten' on the Mississippi River, April 7, 1862. Federal gunboats and mortar boats are shown firing at the Confederate fortifications on the island.

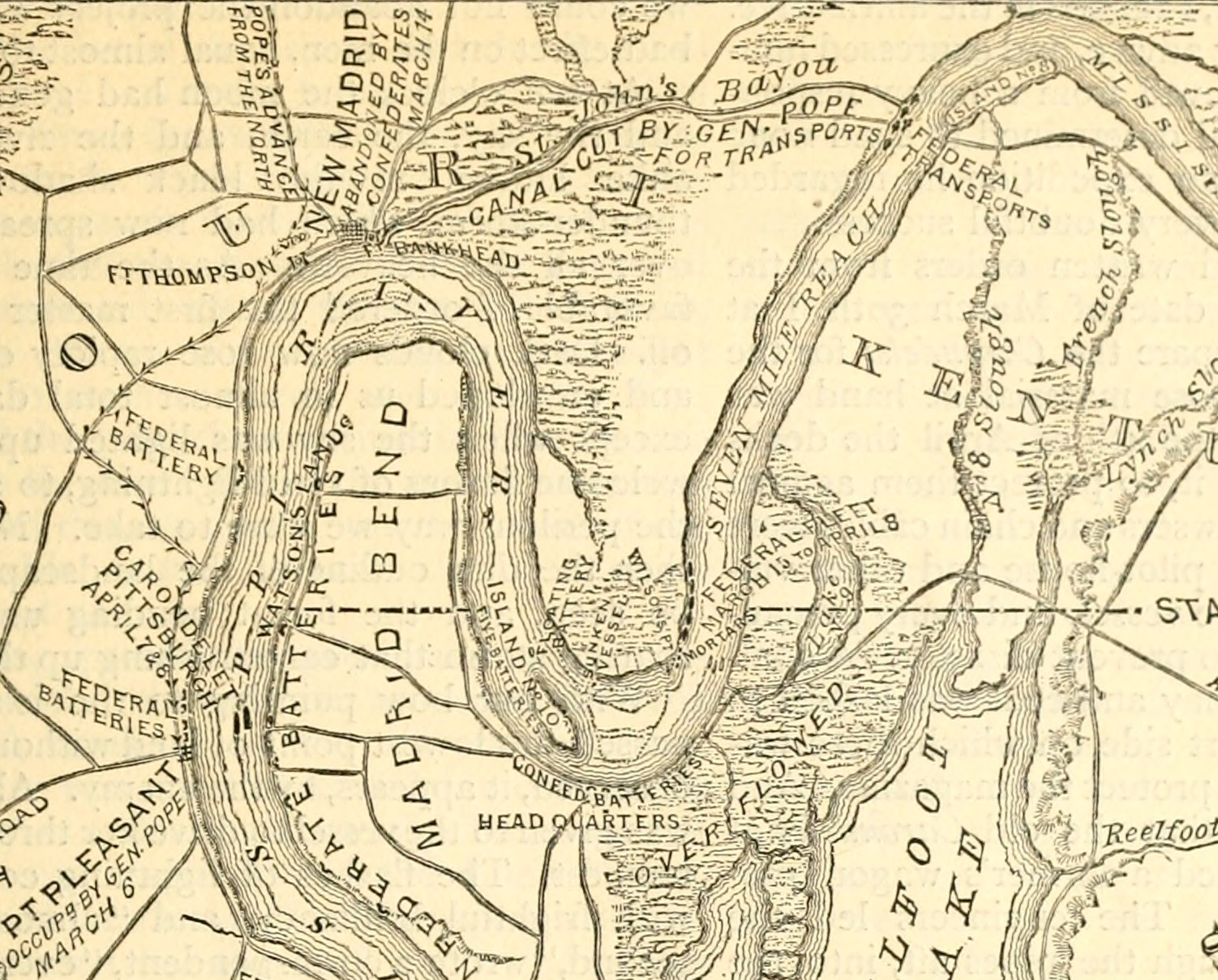
"Island Number Ten" in lower center map detail from a battle of the Civil War

== Later years ==
Today, the land described in the mid-19th century as "Island Number Ten", as is the case with many of the islands of the Lower Mississippi, no longer really exists. Some of what constituted it is now part of the floodplain near New Madrid, Missouri, as the river's channel changed; the bulk of it has simply been eroded away. For this reason, the Battle of Island Number Ten monument, which references this fact, is located on State Route 22 approximately three miles north of Tiptonville; the cemetery where some of the combatants were interred is across the river in Missouri. Another cemetery in the Cronanville Community, 4 miles north of Tiptonville, TN on State Route 22, is the final resting place for 75 Confederates killed defending Island Number 10, who were buried in a mass burial trench.

== See also ==
- Battle of Island Number Ten
- Kentucky Bend
