= CSS McRae =

Confederate gunboat

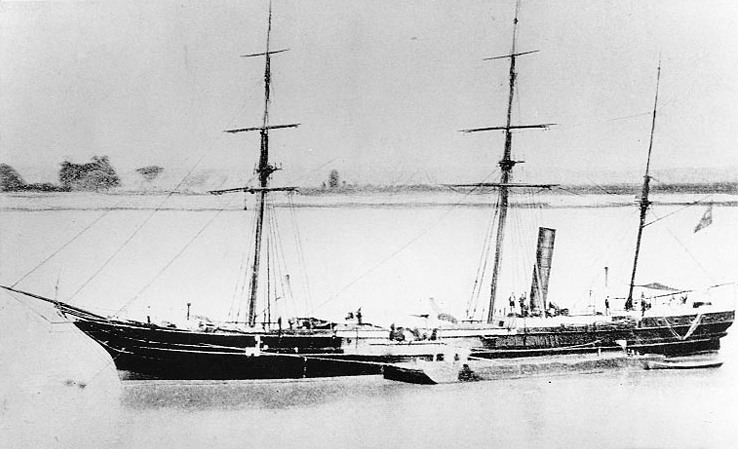
- CSS McRae, New Orleans, 1860

History

Mexico
- Name: Marqués de la Habana'
- Namesake: Marquis of Havana
- Fate: Captured by U.S. Navy 6 March 1860

Confederate States
- Name: CSS McRae
- Acquired: 17 March 1861
- Commissioned: March 1861
- Fate: Scuttled 28 April 1862

General characteristics
- Displacement: Approx. 680 tons
- Propulsion: Single screw, single expansion steam engine
- Sail plan: Bark-rigged sloop; three masts
- Armament: One 9 in (229 mm) smoothbore, six 32-pounder smoothbores, one 6-pounder rifle
- Armor: None

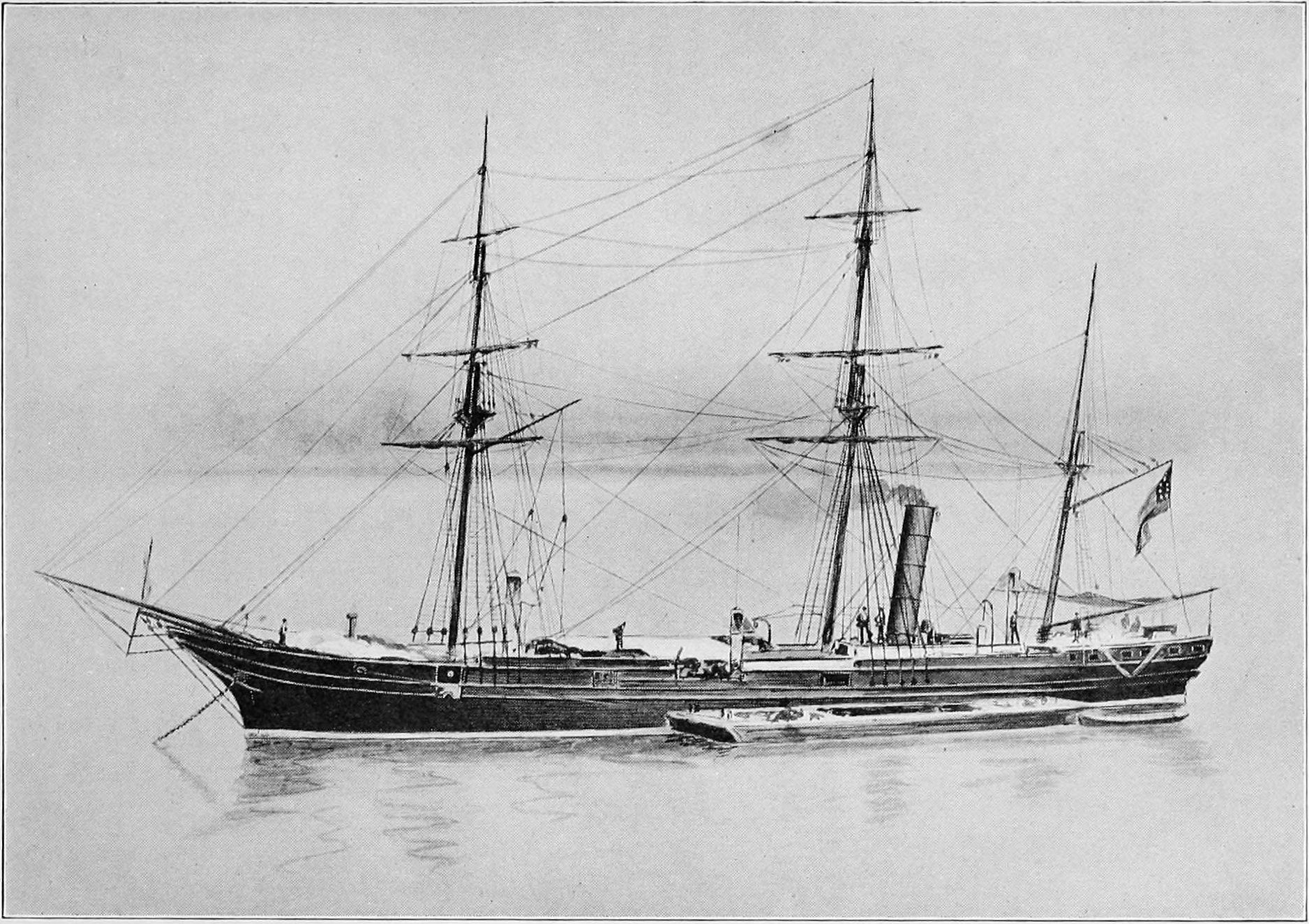
CSS McRae.

CSS McRae was a Confederate gunboat that saw service during the American Civil War. Displacing around 680 tons, she was armed with one 9-inch (229 mm) smoothbore and six 32-pounder (15 kg) smoothbore cannon.

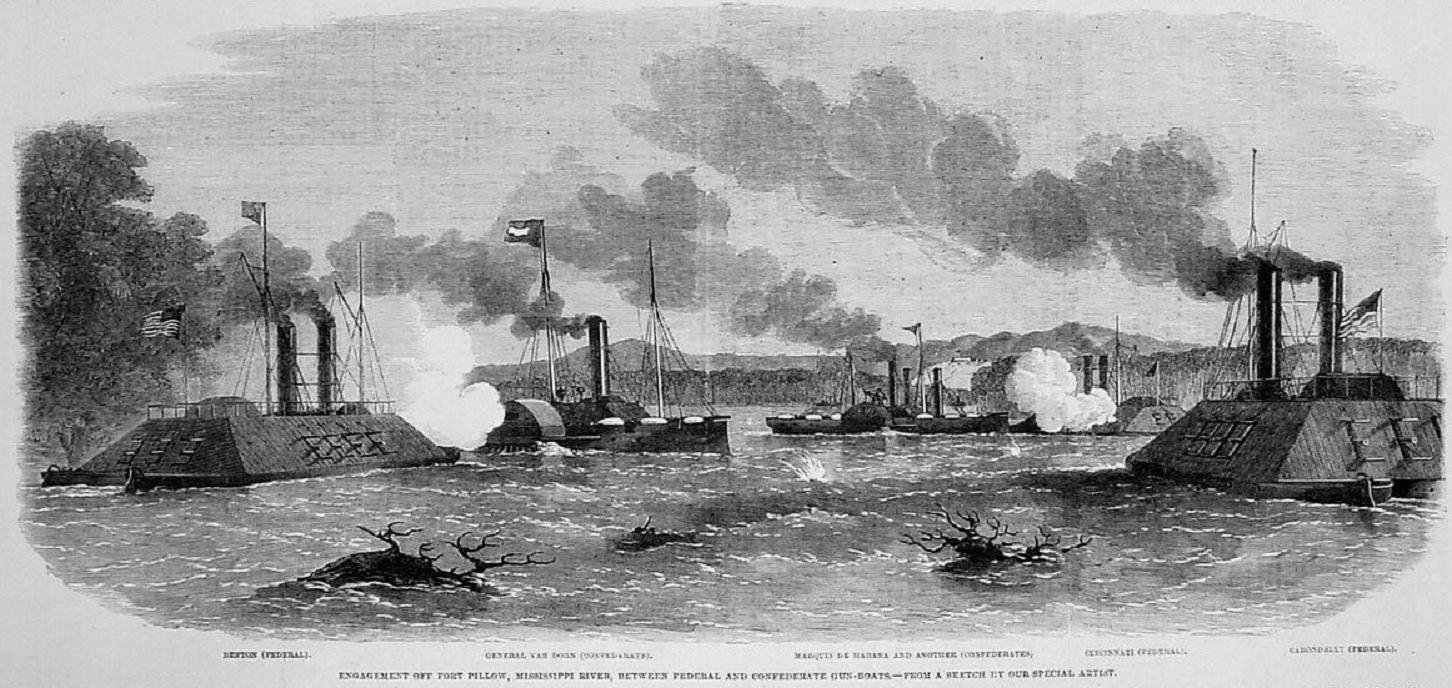
CSS McRae and the cottonclad CSS General Earl Van Dorn engagement federal gunboats at Fort Pillow, Tennessee.

Originally operating as a rebel ship under the Mexican flag with the name Marqués de la Havana, the wooden sloop was captured as a pirate ship by the United States Navy sloop-of-war USS Saratoga during the Battle of Anton Lizardo on 6 March 1860. A construction plan authorizing the building of ten fast gunboats was funded by the Congress of the Confederate States on 15 March 1861. Recognizing that no yard could turn out the vessels fast enough, Confederate States Secretary of the Navy Stephen R. Mallory sent a commission to New Orleans, Louisiana, to convert existing steamers to commerce raiders. The Confederate States Navy purchased Marqués de la Havana at New Orleans on 17 March 1861, and duly fitted her out as CSS McRae as part of this plan. Extensive engine repairs prevented McRae from going to sea before the arrival of the Union blockading force.

Placed under the command of Lieutenant Thomas B. Huger, McRae served as part of Flag Officer George N. Hollins' defense of the lower reaches of the Mississippi River, and provided cover for blockade runners. This led to McRae seeing combat with the Union blockading force on 12 October 1861. McRae took part in the Battle of the Head of Passes as part of Hollins′ "mosquito fleet," driving the Union blockading forces from the Head of Passes in the Mississippi Delta.

McRae again saw action on 24 April 1862 as the Union fleet attempted to pass Fort Jackson and Fort Saint Philip and reach New Orleans. In the resulting Battle of Forts Jackson and St. Philip, McRae suffered little damage in the beginning due to her resemblance to the Union Unadilla-class gunboats. The leading Union ships passed by her without firing. The sloop-of-war USS Iroquois was an exception, and replied to McRae′s gunfire with an 11-inch (279-mm) shell that set fire to McRae's sail room and threatened her magazines. The officers and crew fought hard in this latter engagement but suffered severe casualties (Huger being amongst those mortally wounded), and McRae herself was severely damaged. She was run against the shore to put out her fires, and remained there till dawn, after which she returned to the forts. Loaded with wounded from the forts, McRae was allowed to return to New Orleans on 27 April 1862 under a flag of truce. After landing the wounded at the city, her crew scuttled and abandoned her at Algiers, Louisiana (now a neighborhood of New Orleans), after cutting all her steam pipes.

James Morris Morgan, a Midshipman on the McRae gave a personal account of the battle and the McRae's end: "The McRae was in the thick of the fight. Her sides riddled. Heavy projectiles had knocked her guns off the carriages and rolled them along the deck crunching the dead and wounded. Her deck was a perfect shambles. When day broke the McRae was the only thing afloat with the Confederate flag flying." In the battle, Captain Huger had been mortally wounded and LT. "Savez" Read taken command. "Admiral Farragut, with his flagship the Hartford, was by this time at the Quarantine Station, about four miles above the forts. Read sent the only boat he had that would float over to the Hartford to tell Admiral Farragut the condition of his vessel and the difficulty he was having to keep her afloat--that he did not have a gun left on a carriage, and no one to care for his dying captain or the many other wounded. Farragut gave him permission to proceed to New Orleans, saying that he would tell him there what disposition he would make of the ship. When we arrived at New Orleans McRae was leaking like a sieve; the exhausted remnant of the crew refused to continue at the pumps, and as the last wounded men were taken out of the ship--down she went."

== See also ==
- Battle of Anton Lizardo
