= 2nd Arkansas Mounted Rifles =

- Active: 1861–1865
- Country: Confederate States
- Allegiance: Arkansas
- Branch: Confederate States Army
- Type: Infantry
- Size: Regiment
- Facings: Light blue
- Engagements: American Civil War: Battle of Wilson's Creek; Battle of Chustenahlah; Battle of Pea Ridge; Siege of Corinth; Kentucky Campaign; Battle of Richmond; Battle of Perryville; Battle of Murfreesboro; Tullahoma Campaign; Battle of Liberty Gap; Chattanooga campaign; Battle of Chickamauga; Siege of Chattanooga; Battle of Missionary Ridge; Battle of Ringgold Gap; Atlanta campaign; Battle of Dalton; Battle of Resaca; Battle of New Hope Church; Battle of Kennesaw Mountain; Battle of Peachtree Creek; Siege of Atlanta; Battle of Jonesboro; Franklin–Nashville Campaign; Battle of Spring Hill; Battle of Franklin; Battle of Nashville; Carolinas campaign; Battle of Bentonville

Commanders
- Notable commanders: Col. James M. McIntosh, Col. Harris Flanagin

The 2nd Arkansas Mounted Rifles (1861–1865) was a Confederate Army infantry regiment that served during the American Civil War. Raised in 1861, the regiment consisted of nine companies, which were drawn from various counties in Arkansas. Throughout the course of the war, the 2nd Arkansas Mounted Rifles fought in a number of battles, including those at Wilson's Creek and Pea Ridge, and participated in a number of campaigns such as Tullahoma, Atlanta and the Carolinas. The regiment's final battle came at Bentonville in March 1865 after which its remaining personnel were consolidated into the 1st Arkansas Consolidated Mounted Rifles.

== Organization ==
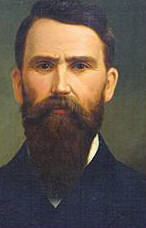
Maj. James P. Eagle

The 2nd Arkansas Mounted Rifles was organized in the summer of 1861, with James M. McIntosh appointed as colonel. Other appointments upon establishment included: Ben T. Embry, lieutenant colonel; Brown, major; W. D. DeBerry, surgeon; W. A. C. Sayle, assistant surgeon. The regiment was inducted into Confederate Service on June 15, 1861, at Osage Prairie, outside Bentonville, Arkansas. The unit was composed of volunteer companies from the following counties:

- Company A, the "Booneville Rifles" – Commanded by Captain William Gipson, from Scott County, Arkansas, enlisted on 18 July 1861.
- Company B, the "Galla Rangers" – Commanded by Captain Ben T. Embry, organized in Pope County, Arkansas, in May 1861.
- Company C – Commanded by Captain J. A. Gray, organized in Prairie County, Arkansas, enlisted on 20 July 1861.
- Company D – Commanded by Captain John A. Arrington, organized in Benton County, Arkansas, 15 July 1861.
- Company E – Commanded by Captain George Gamble, organized in Clark County, Arkansas, enlisted 27 July 1861 at Camp McRae, Arkansas.
- Company F – Commanded by Captain John D. McCabe, organized in Clark County, Arkansas 27 July 1861 at Camp McRae, Arkansas.
- Company G – The "Sevier Rifles", Commanded by Captain Allen T Pettus, organized in Sevier County, Arkansas, on 27 July 1861.
- Company H – the "Hempstead Cavalry", Commanded by Captain Henrt G. Rind, organized in Hempstead County, Arkansas 27 July 1861 at Osage Prairie, AR.
- Company I – Commanded by Captain William F. Patterson, organized in Scott County, Arkansas 20 December 1861 at Cantonment Bee, Arkansas.
- Company K – Commanded by Captain R.N. McReynolds, organized in Madison County, Arkansas 22 December 1861 at Cantonment Bee, Arkansas.

General McIntosh was killed at the battle of Elkhorn Tavern, or Pea Ridge. In May 1862 the Confederate Army underwent an army-wide reorganization due to the passage of the Conscription Act by the Confederate Congress in April 1862. All twelve-month regiments had to re-muster and enlist for two years or the duration of the war; a new election of officers was ordered; and men who were exempted from service by age or other reasons under the Conscription Act were allowed to take a discharge and go home. Officers who did not choose to stand for re-election were also offered a discharge. The reorganization was accomplished among all the Arkansas regiments in and around Corinth, Mississippi, following the Battle of Shiloh.

When the regiment was reorganized after the battle of Shiloh, the following field officers were elected: Captain Harris Flanagin was elected colonel; Major J. A. Williamson was elected lieutenant-colonel; and Captain James P. Eagle was elected major. Upon Colonel Flanagin being elected Governor of the State of Arkansas in 1862, Lieutenant Colonel Williamson became colonel, and Captain Eagle became the lieutenant colonel. Colonel Williamson lost a leg at the battle of Resaca, May 1864, and J. T. Smith was appointed colonel. After Smith was killed in battle on July 28, James P. Eagle then succeeded him as colonel of the regiment.

== Battles ==
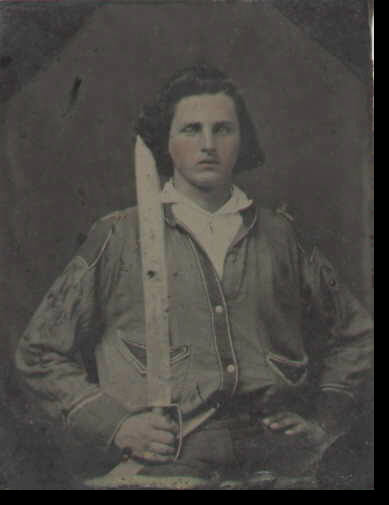
Hezekiah L. Cash, Company E, photographed in the early 1860s

Colonel McIntosh was educated at the United States Military Academy. He was impetuous to a degree that scorned all caution Being ordered by General McCulloch into the Indian Territory against the Creek chief, Hopoeithleyohola, he dispersed the Indian Federal organization. It is said his regiment was deployed in groups of two for five miles, when he at its head began the attack upon the Indian camp. He was speedily promoted to brigadier-general, and Embry became colonel. The regiment took part in the battles of Oak Hills and Elkhorn, and in the Kentucky campaign under E. Kirby Smith. Among its battles were Richmond, Ky., Murfreesboro, Jackson, Miss., Chickamauga, Resaca, Atlanta, Ezra Church, Lovejoy's Station, Jonesboro, Moore's Station, Franklin, Tenn., Nashville, Sugar Creek, and Bentonville, N.C. In accordance with Confederate Adjutant and Inspector General's Office Order Number 131, ten soldiers of the regiment were recognized for courage and good conduct on the field for the Battle of Murfreesboro The unit is entitled to the following Campaign Participation Credits:

- Battle of Wilson's Creek, Missouri, August 10, 1861
- Battle of Chustenahlah, Oklahoma, December 26, 1861
- Battle of Pea Ridge, Arkansas, March 6–8, 1862
- Siege of Corinth, Mississippi, April to June 1862
- Kentucky Campaign, Kentucky, August–October 1862
  - Battle of Richmond, Kentucky, August 29–30, 1862
  - Battle of Perryville, Kentucky, October 8, 1862
- Battle of Murfreesboro, Tennessee, December 31, 1862, to January 3, 1863
- Vicksburg Campaign
  - Battle of Jackson, Mississippi, May 14, 1863
  - Siege of Jackson, Mississippi, July 5–25, 1863
- Chickamauga Campaign,
  - Battle of Chickamauga, Georgia, September 19–20, 1863
- Meridian Campaign,
  - Battle of Meridian, Mississippi, February 14–20, 1864
- Atlanta campaign, May to September 1864
  - Battle of Dug Gap, Georgia, September 10–11, 1863
  - Battle of Resaca, Georgia, May 14–15, 1864
  - Battle of New Hope Church, Georgia, May 25 – June 4, 1864
  - Battle of Pickett's Mill, Georgina, May 27, 1864
  - Battle of Kennesaw Mountain, Georgia, June 27, 1864.
  - Battle of Moore's Hill, Georgia, July 28, 1862
  - Battle of Peachtree Creek, Georgia, July 20, 1864.
  - Siege of Atlanta, Georgia, July 22, 1864.
  - Battle of Lovejoy's Station, Georgia, August 20, 1864
- Franklin–Nashville Campaign September 18 to December 27, 1864
  - Battle of Moon's Station, Georgia, October 3, 1864
  - Battle of Spring Hill, Tennessee, November 29, 1864.
  - Battle of Franklin, Tennessee, November 30, 1864.
  - Battle of Nashville, Tennessee, December 15–16, 1864.
  - Battle of Sugar Creek, Tennessee, December 26, 1864.
- Carolinas campaign, February to April 1865.
  - Battle of Bentonville, North Carolina, March 19–21, 1865.

After the Battle of Nashville, Tennessee, the Arkansas regiments of Reynolds' Brigade marched via Bainbridge, Alabama, Tuscumbia, Iuka and Corinth to Tupelo, Mississippi, where they went into camp on January 10, 1865. They departed Tupelo on January 30 and marched to West Point, Mississippi. From West Point they traveled by rail to Selma, Alabama. From Selma they traveled by steamboat to Montgomery, then by rail to Columbus, Georgia. From Columbus they marched via Macon and Milledgeville to Mayfield, Georgia. From Mayfield they traveled by rail to Augusta, Georgia. From there they marched to Newberry, South Carolina. On March 19, 1865, they fought their last major engagement at the Battle of Bentonville, North Carolina. They then marched to Smithfield, North Carolina, where the entire brigade was consolidated into a single understrength regiment, the 1st Consolidated Mounted Rifles on April 9, 1865.

== Consolidation and surrender ==
On April 9, 1865, the depleted Arkansas regiments of Daniel H. Reynolds' Brigade, Walthall's Division, Confederate Army of Tennessee, were consolidated into a single regiment the 1st Arkansas Consolidated Mounted Rifles, at Smithfield, North Carolina. The companies of the consolidated regiment were drawn from the following Arkansas regiments:

Company A — 1st Arkansas Mounted Rifles.
Company B — 1st Arkansas Mounted Rifles.
Company C — 2nd Arkansas Mounted Rifles.
Company D — 2nd Arkansas Mounted Rifles.
Company E — 4th Arkansas Infantry Regiment.
Company F — 4th Arkansas Infantry Regiment.
Company G — 31st Arkansas Infantry.
Company H — 9th Arkansas Infantry.
Company I — 9th Arkansas Infantry.
Company K — 25th Arkansas Infantry.

The 1st Arkansas Consolidated Mounted Rifles surrendered with the Army of Tennessee at Greensboro, North Carolina, April 26, 1865. The regiment was paroled on May 1, 1865, at Jamestown, North Carolina. After the surrender, the men were offered free rail transportation (where available) in the direction of their homes, by what was left of the Southern railway companies. Most of the men traveled by rail, where they could. A large number of men were killed or seriously injured in a railroad accident at Flat Creek Bridge, Tennessee, on May 25, 1865.

=== African Americans in Confederate Service ===
It was not uncommon for African American slaves to accompany their Confederate masters in the army; there are several documented accounts of African Americans serving as cooks or performing other menial tasks. The 33rd Arkansas Infantry Regiment even included African American cooks on its unit muster rolls. However, accounts of African Americans participating in combat on behalf of the South are rare. Martin Cole's negro killed two Dutchmen and got a good gun."

== See also ==
- List of Confederate units from Arkansas
- Confederate Units by State

== Bibliography ==
- Allen, Desmond Walls. First Arkansas Confederate Mounted Rifles. Conway, AR: D. W. Allen, 1988.
- Bender, Robert Patrick (ed.), Worthy of the Cause for Which They Fight: The Civil War Diary of Brigadier General Daniel Harris Reynolds, 1861-1865. (University of Arkansas Press, 2011), accessed at Google eBooks, https://books.google.com/books?id=H10SkwjYznkC&q=Reynolds+arkansas+brigade ISBN 978-1-55728-971-1.
- Christ, Mark K., ed. Getting Used to Being Shot At: The Spence Family Civil War Letters. Fayetteville: University of Arkansas Press, 2002.
- “Field Officers and Staff, 2nd Arkansas Mounted Rifles, Confederate States of America.” Edward G. Gerdes Civil War Homepage. (accessed October 21, 2008).
- Leeper, Wesley Thurman. Rebels Valiant: Second Arkansas Mounted Rifles (Dismounted). Little Rock, AR: Pioneer Press, 1964.
- Piston, William Garrett. “‘When the Arks. Boys Goes By They Take the Rags Off the Bush’: Arkansans in the Wilson’s Creek Campaign of 1861.” In The Die is Cast: Arkansas Goes to War, 1861, edited by Mark K. Christ. Little Rock: Butler Center Books, 2010.
