= 25th Arkansas Infantry Regiment =

Infantry regiment of the Confederate States Army

- Regimental color of the 25th (formerly known as 30th) Arkansas Infantry at the Old State House Museum in Little Rock, Arkansas
- Active: 1862–1865
- Disbanded: April 9, 1865
- Country: Confederate States
- Allegiance: Arkansas
- Branch: Army
- Type: Infantry
- Size: Regiment
- Facings: Light blue
- Engagements: American Civil War; Battle of Farmington; Battle of Richmond; Battle of Perryville; Battle of Murfreesboro; Siege of Jackson; Battle of Chickamauga; Battle of Meridian; Battle of Dug Gap; Battle of Resaca; Battle of New Hope Church; Battle of Kennesaw Mountain; Battle of Moore's Hill; Battle of Peachtree Creek; Battle of Atlanta; Battle of Ezra Church; Siege of Atlanta; Battle of Jonesboro; Battle of Lovejoy's Station; Battle of Moon's Station; Battle of Franklin; Battle of Nashville; Battle of Sugar Creek; Battle of Bentonville
- Battle honors: Farmington, Richmond

The 25th Arkansas Infantry Regiment, formerly known as the 30th Arkansas Infantry Regiment, was an infantry formation of the Confederate States Army in the Western Theater of the American Civil War. The other "Thirtieth Arkansas" served west of the Mississippi River in the Department of the Trans-Mississippi and was also known as 5th Trans-Mississippi Regiment, 39th Arkansas Infantry Regiment, and Rogan's Arkansas Cavalry during Price's 1864 Missouri Expedition.

== History ==
The 25th Arkansas Infantry was organized as the 30th Arkansas Infantry Regiment on June 18, 1862, when the 11th Battalion Arkansas Infantry was increased to a regiment. Turnbull's battalion is mentioned as a part of a group of units belonging to the "White River forces" under the command of Colonel James H. McCarver of the 14th Arkansas at Pocahontas, Arkansas, on March 31, 1862. The unit is described in a "morning report" of that date as a temporary battalion under the command of Captain Charles J. Turnbull with 484 present for duty. Special Order Number 47, Army of the West, dated 10 April 1862 at Des Arc, Arkansas, signed by General Earl Van Dorn ordered the infantry companies of Captains Reinhard, Byers, Sloan, Hufstedler, Morgan and Oates to move to Memphis via steamer, under the command of Captain Turnbull and there to report to Brigadier General Albert Rust who was to organize them into a regiment with the companies of Adams, Rodgers, McCray, and Adair, but the election of officers was to be deferred until all the companies were present. Special Order Number 67, Army of the West, dated 27 April 1862 at Memphis, Tennessee, directed that Turnbull's Arkansas Regiment be organized and an election of officers be held at once. By Special Order Number 80, Army of the West, dated 27 April 1862, Lieutenant Colonel Turnbull's Battalion was temporarily detached from Churchill's Brigade and assigned to duty with Colonel M. L. Clark's Artillery Brigade. Also Captain Franklin's Company, the Peyton Rifles of Pulaski County, which had been assigned as Company C of Jones' 8th Arkansas Infantry Battalion was transferred to Turnbull's 11th Arkansas Infantry Battalion in order to increase 11th Battalion to a full regiment which would be designated the 30th Arkansas Infantry Regiment. The regiment was composed of the following companies:

- Company A – Enrolled at Randolph County, Arkansas, on March 18, 1863, under the command of Captain Eli Hufstedler of Pocahontas.
- Company B – Enrolled at Little Rock, Arkansas, on March 1, 1862, under the command of Captain James W. Adams of Saline County.
- Company C – Enrolled at Jacksonport, Arkansas, on March 13, 1862, under the command of Captain John Thomas. This company was originally organized on November 12, 1861, as "Volunteer Company B" in the 50th Regiment, Arkansas State Militia, Prairie County.
- Company D – Enrolled at Pocahontas, Randolph County, Arkansas (included many from Green Co.) March 25−26, 1862 under the command of Captain S. T. Black of Pocahontas, killed at Murfreesboro.
- Company E – Enrolled at Jacksonport, Arkansas, on March 10, 1862, under the command of Captain William C. Moore.
- Company F – the "Peyton Rifles" – Enrolled at Little Rock, Arkansas, on March 15, 1862, under the command of Captain J. J. Franklin of Little Rock, elected major at the regimental organization and subsequently lieutenant colonel, succeeded by Captain L. L. Noles, promoted major, first lieutenant John O'Brien then becoming captain. This company was previously briefly assigned as Company C of the 8th Arkansas Infantry Battalion before being transferred to the 25th Arkansas. This company was originally organized on April 20, 1860, as a volunteer company in the 13th Regiment, Arkansas State Militia, under the command of Captain Daniel W. Ringo. The company was assigned to Borland's Arkansas Militia Battalion and participated in the seizure of the Fort Smith Arsenal in April 1861, before the state seceded.
- Company G – Enrolled at Pocahontas, Arkansas, on March 13, 1862, under the command of Captain Stephen Smith of Pocahontas.
- Company H – Enrolled at Brownsville, Arkansas, on March 11, 1862, under the command of Captain W. A. Cotter.
- Company I – Enrolled at Jacksonport, Arkansas, on March 19, 1862, under the command of Captain J. G. Adams. This company was originally organized on November 12, 1861, as "Volunteer Company A" in the 50th Regiment, Arkansas State Militia, Prairie County.
- Company K – Enrolled at St. Charles, Arkansas, on February 22, 1862, under the command of Captain John A. Wakefield of St. Charles.

Turnbull, of Little Rock, was elected colonel of the regiment. Henry Remington was elected lieutenant colonel, but resigned and was replaced by Eli Hufstedler. James J. Franklin was elected major. After the Battle of Murfreesboro, the regiment was renamed as the 25th Arkansas Infantry. The field officers were Colonel Charles J. Turnbull, Lieutenant Colonels Eli Hufstedler and Thomas S. Simington, and Majors James J. Franklin and L. L. Noles. Major Franklin was wounded at Murfreesboro, and Captain Noles, of Company E became major. He was killed at the Battle of Kennesaw Mountain, and was succeeded by Captain Cotter, of Company H. Captain S. T. Black, of Company D, was killed at Murfreesboro.

== Battles ==
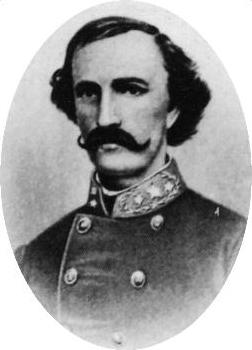
Thomas J. Churchill

The new regiment was assigned to Thomas James Churchill's brigade of General Van Dorn's Army of the West by Special Order Number 64, dated April 24, 1862, from Memphis. After the Battle of Farmington, Mississippi, on May 9, 1862, as part of the general reorganization of Confederate forces for the upcoming Kentucky Campaign, the 30th Arkansas was assigned to Colonel Evander McNair's 2nd Brigade of Brigadier General Thomas James Churchill's 3rd Division of Major General Edmund Kirby Smith's Army of Central Kentucky and participated in the Battle of Richmond Kentucky. The unit reported 10 casualties at Richmond.

After the Kentucky Campaign, General Bragg consolidated the Army of Kentucky and the Army of Mississippi into one force known as the Confederate Army of Tennessee. During the Stone's River Campaign, the 30th Arkansas was assigned to Brigadier General Evander McNair's 3rd Brigade of Major General John P. McCown's 3rd Division of William J. Hardee's Corps of the new Army of Tennessee. The regiment lost 7 killed, 51 wounded, and 3 missing during the Battle of Murfreesboro. In accordance with Confederate Adjutant and Inspector General's Office Order Number 131, ten soldiers of the regiment were recognized for courage and good conduct on the field for the Battle of Murfreesboro

Following the Battle of Murfreesboro, the unit was officially redesignated as the 25th Arkansas Infantry. Heavy casualties suffered at Murfreesboro in McNair's Brigade caused several field (temporary) consolidations among its regiments. On February 9, 1863, the 25th Arkansas was temporarily consolidated with the Thirty-first Arkansas. Colonel McCray, of the Thirty-first was placed in command of the consolidated 25th/31st Arkansas.

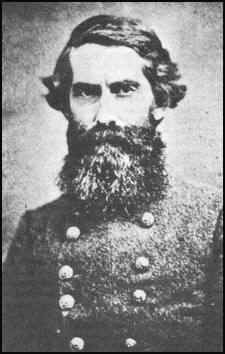
William H. T. Walker

In June, 1863, McNair's Brigade was reassigned to William H.T. Walker's (later French's) Division of the Army of the Department of Mississippi and Eastern Louisiana, under the overall command of General Joseph E. Johnston who was assigned the mission of organizing a force to attempt to relieve Lieutenant General John C. Pemberton's besieged army at Vicksburg. Johnston had been gathering troops at Jackson, intending to relieve pressure on Pemberton's beleaguered garrison. Johnston cautiously advanced his 30,000 soldiers toward the rear of Grant's army surrounding Vicksburg. In response, Grant ordered Sherman to deal with Johnston's threat. By July 1, 1863, Johnston's force was in position along the Big Black River. Sherman used the newly arrived IX Corps to counter this threat. On July 5, the day after the surrender of Vicksburg was made official; Sherman was free to move against Johnston. Johnston hastily withdrew his force across the Big Black River and Champion's Hill battlefields with Sherman in pursuit. Sherman had with him the IX Corps, XV Corps, XIII Corps, and a detachment of the XVI Corps. On July 10 the Union Army had taken up position around Jackson. The heaviest fighting in the Siege of Jackson came on July 11 during an unsuccessful Union attack, which resulted in heavy casualties. Instead of risking entrapment, Johnston chose to evacuate the state capital and withdrew on July 16. Sherman's forces occupied the city the following day.

In the aftermath of the Vicksburg Campaign most of Johnston's army was transferred back to the Army of Tennessee. The 25th Arkansas participated in the Chickamauga Campaign under the command of Lieutenant Colonel Eli Hufstedler. Because the regiment mustered only 111 men at the beginning of the fight, the 25th Arkansas was consolidated with the 39th North Carolina Regiment under command of Col. David Coleman of the 39th North Carolina. Lieut. The 25th Arkansas sustained heavy casualties (over 50 percent) in proportion to its effective strength, eleven killed or mortally wounded, forty-seven wounded, and three missing for a total 61. According to an ordnance report prepared after the battle, the soldiers of the 25th Arkansas fired an average of 80 rounds per man during the battle.

Following the Battle of Chickamauga, NcNair's Brigade moved back to central Mississippi to oppose General Sherman's Meridian Campaign. Sherman organized an expedition of 20,000 men to move into central Mississippi to break up Confederate rail communications and other infrastructure near Meridian, Mississippi, and solidify Union control of the Mississippi River. The Meridian campaign was a "dress rehearsal" for the style of war against infrastructure that Sherman, as well as some of these very troops, would later practice in Georgia. To counter the threat, Confederate President Jefferson Davis ordered troops to the area from other localities, including McNair's Brigade. The Confederate commander in the area, Lieutenant General Leonidas Polk, consolidated a number of commands in and around Morton, Mississippi, but failed to stop Sherman's moves. Meridian was essentially destroyed by Sherman and most of Polk's forces were transferred to the Army of Tennessee in time to oppose Sherman's Atlanta Campaign.

When Joseph E. Johnston assumed command of the Army of Tennessee in order to resist General Sherman's Atlanta campaign, Daniel H. Reynolds had replaced Evander McNair, who was wounded at Chickamauga, as brigade commander, and the brigade was assigned to Brigadier General James Cantey's Division of Lieutenant General Leonidas Polk's Corps. The unit would serve through the Atlanta Campaign and during General John B. Hood's Franklin-Nashville Campaign. The unit participated in the following campaigns and engagements:

  - Battle of Farmington
- Kentucky Campaign, Kentucky, August–October, 1862.
  - Battle of Richmond, Kentucky, August 29–30, 1862.
  - Battle of Perryville, Kentucky, October 8, 1862.
- Battle of Murfreesboro, Tennessee, December 31, 1862, to January 3, 1863.
- Vicksburg Campaign
  - Battle of Jackson, Mississippi, May 14, 1863.
  - Siege of Jackson, Mississippi, July 5–25, 1863.
- Chickamauga Campaign
  - Battle of Chickamauga, Georgia, September 19–20, 1863.
- Meridian Campaign
  - Battle of Meridian, Mississippi, February 14–20, 1864.
- Atlanta campaign, May to September 1864.
  - Battle of Resaca, Georgia, May 14–15, 1864.
  - Battle of New Hope Church, Georgia, May 25–June 4, 1864.
  - Battle of Kennesaw Mountain, Georgia, June 27, 1864.
  - Battle of Peachtree Creek, Georgia, July 20, 1864.
  - Siege of Atlanta, Georgia, July 22, 1864.
  - Battle of Jonesboro, Georgia, August 31–September 1, 1864.
- Franklin–Nashville Campaign, Alabama, Georgia, and Tennessee, September 18–December 27, 1864.
  - Battle of Franklin, Tennessee, November 30, 1864.
  - Battle of Nashville, Tennessee, December 15–16, 1864.
- Carolinas campaign, February–April 1865.
  - Battle of Bentonville, North Carolina, March 19–21, 1865.

After the Battle of Nashville, Tennessee, the Arkansas regiments of Reynolds' Brigade marched via Bainbridge, Alabama, Tuscumbia, Iuka and Corinth to Tupelo, Mississippi, where they went into camp on January 10, 1865. They departed Tupelo on January 30 and marched to West Point, Mississippi. From West Point they traveled by rail to Selma, Alabama. From Selma they traveled by steamboat to Montgomery, then by rail to Columbus, Georgia. From Columbus they marched via Macon and Milledgeville to Mayfield, Georgia. From Mayfield they traveled by rail to Augusta, Georgia. From there they marched to Newberry, South Carolina. On March 19, 1865, they fought their last major engagement at the Battle of Bentonville, North Carolina. They then marched to Smithfield, North Carolina, where the entire brigade was consolidated into a single understrength regiment, the 1st Consolidated Mounted Rifles on April 9, 1865.

== Consolidation and surrender ==
On April 9, 1865, the depleted Arkansas regiments of D. H. Reynolds' Brigade, Walthall's Division, Confederate Army of Tennessee, were consolidated into a single regiment the 1st Arkansas Consolidated Mounted Rifles, at Smithfield, North Carolina. The companies of the consolidated regiment were drawn from the following Arkansas regiments:

- Company A – 1st Arkansas Mounted Rifles
- Company B – 1st Arkansas Mounted Rifles
- Company C – 2nd Arkansas Mounted Rifles
- Company D – 2nd Arkansas Mounted Rifles
- Company E – 4th Arkansas Infantry Regiment
- Company F – 4th Arkansas Infantry Regiment
- Company G – 31st Arkansas Infantry Regiment
- Company H – 9th Arkansas Infantry Regiment
- Company I – 9th Arkansas Infantry Regiment
- Company K – 25th Arkansas Infantry Regiment

The 1st Arkansas Consolidated Mounted Rifles surrendered with the Army of Tennessee at Greensboro, North Carolina, April 26, 1865. The regiment was paroled on May 1, 1865, at Jamestown, North Carolina. After the surrender, the men were offered free rail transportation (where available) in the direction of their homes, by what was left of the Southern railway companies. Most of the men traveled by rail, where they could. A large number of men were killed or seriously injured in a railroad accident at Flat Creek Bridge, Tennessee, on May 25, 1865.

== Regimental color ==
The regimental color of the 25th (formerly known as 30th) Regiment

The 25th Arkansas Infantry was designated as the 30th Arkansas Infantry for a period of about six months in the winter of 1862–1863, until after the battle of Murfreesboro. While serving as the 30th Arkansas Infantry its colors were captured by the 2nd Ohio Infantry at the Battle of Murfreesboro, Tennessee, on December 31, 1862. The flag was returned to the State of Arkansas by the U.S. War Department in 1905.

The flag measures 40 inches on the staff by 46 inches on the fly. It is composed of a blue cotton field, bordered on all sides with white cotton, 3 inches wide, with a white St. Andrew's cross traversing the blue field. In black painted outline figures, 2-1/2 inches high, is the designation 30TH REG, ARK INF on the upper and lower borders, respectively. Two battle honors—FARMINGTON MISS and RICHMOND KY—appear in white painted outline letters, in the upper and lower quadrants, respectively, formed by the white cross. The flag is presently housed in the collection of the Old State House Museum in Little Rock, Arkansas.

== See also ==
- List of Confederate units from Arkansas

== Bibliography ==
- Sifakis, Stewart. Compendium of the Confederate Armies: Florida and Arkansas. (New York and Oxford: Facts on File. 1992).
- Things Grew Beautifully Worse: Captain John O'Brien, 30th Arkansas Infantry, C.S.A., edited by Brian K. Robertson, Butler Center for Arkansas Studies 2001–05, ISBN 9780970857415
