= 4th Arkansas Infantry Regiment (Confederate) =

- Regimental Color of the Fourth Arkansas
- Active: 1861–1865
- Disbanded: April 26, 1865
- Country: Confederate States
- Allegiance: Arkansas
- Branch: Army
- Type: Infantry
- Size: Regiment
- Facings: Light blue
- Engagements: American Civil War: Battle of Pea Ridge; Siege of Corinth; Kentucky Campaign; Battle of Richmond; Battle of Perryville; Battle of Murfreesboro; Vicksburg Campaign; Battle of Jackson; Siege of Jackson; Chickamauga Campaign; Battle of Chickamauga; Meridian Campaign; Battle of Meridian; Atlanta campaign; Battle of Dug Gap; Battle of Resaca; Battle of New Hope Church; Battle of Kennesaw Mountain; Battle of Moore's Hill; Battle of Peachtree Creek; Battle of Atlanta; Battle of Ezra Church; Siege of Atlanta; Battle of Jonesboro; Battle of Lovejoy's Station; Battle of Moon's Station; Franklin–Nashville Campaign; Battle of Franklin; Battle of Nashville; Battle of Sugar Creek; Carolinas campaign; Battle of Bentonville
- Battle honours: Murfreesboro

Commanders
- Notable commanders: Col. Evander McNair

The 4th Arkansas Infantry (August 17, 1861 – April 26, 1865) was a Confederate States Army infantry regiment from the state of Arkansas during the American Civil War. The 4th Arkansas served throughout the war in the western theater, seeing action in the Kentucky, Tennessee and Georgia campaigns. Following its depletion in numbers the regiment was consolidated several times with other Arkansas regiments, finally merging in 1865 into the 1st Arkansas Consolidated Mounted Rifles. Another Arkansas unit also had the designation 4th Arkansas, the 4th Regiment, Arkansas State Troops which participated in the Battle of Wilson's Creek, but was never transferred to Confederate Service. There is no connection between the two units.

== Formation ==
Originally known as the "Southwestern Arkansas Regiment", the 4th Arkansas was organized at Mount Vernon, Missouri, from volunteer companies from the southwestern part of Arkansas, which arrived in Missouri just after the Battle of Wilson's Creek. The original eight companies which were mustered into service at Miller's Springs, Missouri, on August 17, 1861, were:

- Company A – the "Calhoun Escopets" – of Calhoun County, commanded by Captain Joseph B.McCulloch. This company was originally organized as a volunteer militia company named the "Moro Greys". the company later changed its name to Calhoun Escopets because a large majority were originally armed with double barreled shotguns and Escopet was thought to be French for shotgun. Howerton, Bryan "", Arkansas in the Civil War Message Board, Posted 14 June 2004, Accessed 10 November 2016, http://www.history-sites.com/cgi-bin/bbs62x/arcwmb/arch_config.pl?md=read;id=4346
- Company B – the "Hempstead Hornets" – of Hempstead County, commanded by Captain Rufus K. Garland.
- Company C – the "Caddo Rifles" – of Montgomery County, commanded by Captain Francis J. Erwin.
- Company D – the "Bright Star Rifles" – of Lafayette County, commanded by Captain Josephuse Tison.
- Company E – the "Confederate Guards" – of Hempstead County, commanded by Captain John A. Rowles. This company was originally organized as a volunteer company of the 8th Regiment, Arkansas State Militia.
- Company F – the "Montgomery Hunters" – of Montgomery County, commanded by Captain John M. Simpson.
- Company G – the "Pike County Blues" – of Pike County, commanded by Captain James F. Black.
- Company H – the "Polk County Invincibles" – of Polk County, commanded by Captain William H. Earp.

Two additional companies were added on October 26, 1861, at Fort Smith, Arkansas:

- Company I – the "Polk Rifles" – of Polk County, commanded by Captain James B. Williamson.
- Company K – the "Calhoun Invincibles" – of Calhoun County, commanded by Captain Oliver H. P. Black. This company was originally known as the "Calhoun Bear Hunters", but apparently opted to change their name to the more noble sounding "Calhoun Invincibles".

An eleventh company was temporarily attached—Kelley's Company, the "Pike County Rangers" of Pike County. On 18 August they marched to Mt. Vernon, Missouri, where the following commissioned and non-commissioned staff officers were appointed:

- Colonel: Mcnair, Evander from Hempstead Co.
- Major: May, James H. from Montgomery Co.
- Surgeon: Gammage, W.L.
- Assistant Surgeon: Jones, F.N. of Arkansas
- Quartermaster: Walker, George W.
- Adjutant: Grant, Nathaniel Lieutenant of Company C. Montgomery Co.
- Chaplain: Black, B.B. of Washington Co.
- Sergeant-Major: Johnson, Needham O.S. of Company E.
- Fife Major: Prince, Wm. H. Private of Company E.
- Drum Major: Knox, Wm. W. Private of Company E.
- Forage Master: Bostick, John of Company C. Montgomery Co.
- Quartermaster Sergeant: Black, Warren Private of Company A., Calhoun Co.
- Commissary Sergeant: Beard, John Private of Company B., Of Washington.
- Quartermaster's Clerk: Ferguson, of Washington.
- Hospital Steward: Kerr, Dr. E.W. Private of Company B, Hempstead Co.

== Battles ==
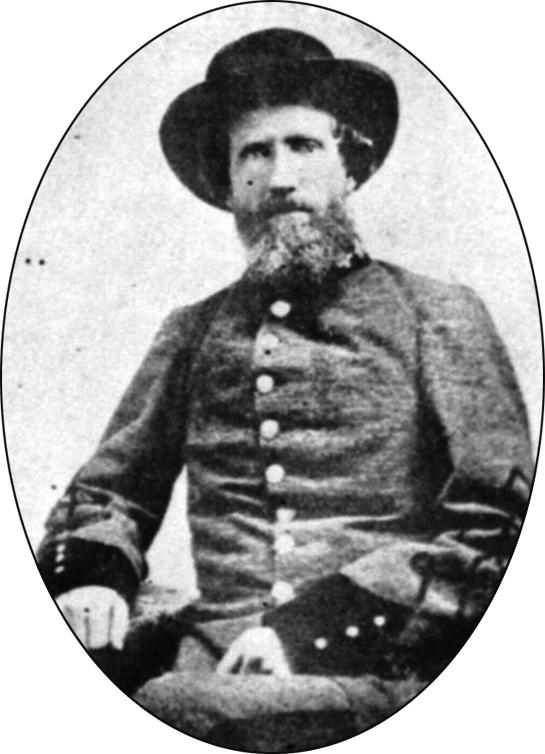
Col. Evander McNair

The 4th Arkansas was originally assigned to McCulloch's Brigade in northwest Arkansas in late August 1861, and served in the Indian Territory, September–October 1861. The regiment was reassigned to Colonel Louis Hébert's Brigade, of Brigadier General Ben McCulloch's Division of Major General Earl Van Dorn's Army of the West in February 1862. The regiment fought at Leetown area of the battlefield during Pea Ridge on March 7–8, 1862, under the command of Colonel Evander McNair. When General Ben McCulloch was killed at the Battle of Pea Ridge and Colonel Louis Hebert captured, Colonel McNair took command of the brigade. The unit was organized with 695 men, and reported 55 casualties at the Battle of Pea Ridge.

The 4th Arkansas reconsolidated at Van Buren, Arkansas, then marched overland to Des Arc where the regiment was transported by steamboat to Memphis in an attempt to unite the Army of the West with the Confederate Army of Mississippi to attack Grant at Pittsburg Landing, Tennessee, but arrived too late for the Battle of Shiloh. From June 6 to June 30, 1862, the 4th Arkansas Regiment was in camp near Tupelo, Mississippi, along with other Arkansas regiments. Dozens of Arkansas soldiers died of disease in the camp hospital during this period, and many more were discharged for disability.

In early May 1862 the Confederate forces underwent an army-wide reorganization due to the passage of the Conscription Act by the Confederate Congress in April 1862. All twelve-month regiments had to re-muster and enlist for two additional years or the duration of the war; a new election of officers was ordered; and men who were exempted from service by age or other reasons under the Conscription Act were allowed to take a discharge and go home. Officers who did not choose to stand for re-election were also offered a discharge. The reorganization was accomplished among all the Arkansas regiments in and around Corinth, Mississippi, following the Battle of Shiloh. The 4th Arkansas Infantry was reorganized at Camp Churchill Clark, Corinth, Mississippi, on May 8, 1862, for two years' additional service (later extended to three years or the war). The only change among the field officers at this time was the replacement of Lieutenant Colonel Samuel Ogden by Lieutenant Henry Gaston Bunn.

During the Kentucky Campaign, McNair's brigade was assigned to Churchill's division, under the overall command of General Kirby Smith. General Smith pushed rapidly into the bluegrass region of Kentucky, and defeated the Union army at the Battle of Richmond. In the desperate battle that occurred there, McNair's brigade turned the enemy's right and contributed to the rout that followed. The 4th Arkansas, under the command of Lieutenant Colonel Henry C. Bunn reported 23 casualties at the Battle of Richmond.

On November 4, 1862, Colonel McNair was commissioned brigadier-general. His brigade included the following Arkansas units, the 1st and 2nd Arkansas Mounted Rifles (dismounted), 4th and 13th Arkansas Infantry Regiments, 4th Arkansas Infantry Battalion, and Humphreys' battery of artillery. On the same day, Henry Gaston Bunn was elected Colonel of the 4th Arkansas as the replacement for Brigadier General McNair.

During the Battle of Murfreesboro, Tennessee, on December 31, 1862, McNair's brigade took part in the brilliant charge of McCown's division, which, aided by the Divisions of Withers and Cheatham, drove the Federal right a distance of between 3–4 miles (4.8–6.4 km), bending it back upon the center, until the line was at right angles to its original position. The 4th Arkansas lost another 79 casualties at Murfreesboro. In accordance with Confederate Adjutant and Inspector General's Office Order Number 131, nine soldiers of the regiment were recognized for courage and good conduct on the field for the Battle of Murfreesboro

In June, 1863, McNair's Brigade was reassigned to Walker's (later French's) Division of the Army of the Department of Mississippi and Eastern Louisiana, under the overall command of General Joseph E. Johnston who was assigned the mission of organizing a force to attempt to relieve General Pemberton's besieged army at Vicksburg. Johnston had been gathering troops at Jackson, intending to relieve pressure on Lt. Gen. John C. Pemberton's beleaguered garrison. Johnston cautiously advanced his 30,000 soldiers toward the rear of Grant's army surrounding Vicksburg. In response, Grant ordered Sherman to deal with Johnston's threat. By July 1, 1863, Johnston's force was in position along the Big Black River. Sherman used the newly arrived IX Corps to counter this threat. On July 5, the day after the surrender of Vicksburg was made official; Sherman was free to move against Johnston. Johnston hastily withdrew his force across the Big Black River and Champion's Hill battlefields with Sherman in pursuit. Sherman had with him the IX Corps, XV Corps, XIII Corps, and a detachment of the XVI Corps. On July 10 the Union Army had taken up position around Jackson. The heaviest fighting in the Siege of Jackson came on July 11 during an unsuccessful Union attack, which resulted in heavy casualties. Instead of risking entrapment, Johnston chose to evacuate the state capital and withdrew on July 16. Sherman's forces occupied the city the following day.

In the aftermath of the Vicksburg Campaign most of Johnston's army was transferred back to the Army of Tennessee. By late August 1863, losses had forced the consolidation of the 4th Arkansas with other depleted Arkansas regiments. The 4th was consolidated with the remnants of the 31st Arkansas Infantry Regiment and the 4th Arkansas Infantry Battalion. Companies C and D of the 4th Arkansas formed one company, under the company of Captain Coatney. Companies F; G; H; and I of the same regiment into one company, under the command of Captain Lavender. All companies of the 31st were consolidated into two companies. Colonel H.G. Bunn, of the 4th Arkansas commanded the consolidated regiment.

At the Battle of Chickamauga, McNair's was one of the eight brigades which, under Major General James Longstreet's direction, rushed through the gap in the Federal line and put one wing of the Union army to rout. In the battle McNair was wounded and the brigade as a whole suffered heavy casualties. The consolidated 4th/31st/4th Arkansas lost twenty-four percent of the 385 soldiers engaged at Chickamauga.

Following the Battle of Chickamauga, NcNair's Brigade moved back to central Mississippi to oppose General Sherman's Meridian Campaign. Sherman organized an expedition of 20,000 men to move into central Mississippi to break up Confederate rail communications and other infrastructure near Meridian Mississippi, and solidify Union control of the Mississippi River. The Meridian campaign was a "dress rehearsal" for the style of war against infrastructure that Sherman, as well as some of these very troops, would later practice in Georgia. To counter the threat, Confederate President Jefferson Davis ordered troops to the area from other localities, including McNair's Brigade. The Confederate commander in the area, Lieutenant General Leonidas Polk, consolidated a number of commands in and around Morton, Mississippi, but failed to stop Sherman's moves. Meridian was essentially destroy by Sherman and most of Polks forces were transferred to the Army of Tennessee in time to oppose Sherman's Atlanta Campaign.

Through the summer and fall of 1864 the 4th Arkansas and the rest of their brigade, now under the command of Brigadier General Daniel Harris Reynolds, participated in the Atlanta campaign through Georgia as a part of the force attempting to stop Sherman. After the fall of Atlanta, the 4th Arkansas along with the rest of the army, now under the command of General John Bell Hood, moved back to Tennessee, where they fought at the Battle of Franklin and the Battle of Nashville. The unit is entitled to the following Campaign Participation Credits:

  - Battle of Pea Ridge, Arkansas, March 6–8, 1862.
  - Siege of Corinth, Mississippi, April to June 1862.
  - Kentucky Campaign, Kentucky, August–October 1862.
    - Battle of Richmond, Kentucky, August 29–30, 1862.
    - Battle of Perryville, Kentucky, October 8, 1862.
  - Battle of Murfreesboro, Tennessee, December 31, 1862, to January 3, 1863.
  - Vicksburg Campaign
    - Battle of Jackson, Mississippi, May 14, 1863.
    - Siege of Jackson, Mississippi, July 5–25, 1863.
  - Chickamauga Campaign
    - Battle of Chickamauga, Georgia, September 19–20, 1863.
  - Meridian Campaign
    - Battle of Meridian, Mississippi, February 14–20, 1864.
  - Atlanta campaign, May to September 1864.
    - Battle of Dug Gap, Georgia, September 10–11, 1863.
    - Battle of Resaca, Georgia, May 14–15, 1864.
    - Battle of New Hope Church, Georgia, May 25–June 4, 1864.
    - Battle of Pickett's Mill, Georgia, May 27, 1864.
    - Battle of Kennesaw Mountain, Georgia, June 27, 1864.
    - Battle of Moore's Hill, Georgia, July 28, 1862.
    - Battle of Peachtree Creek, Georgia, July 20, 1864.
    - Siege of Atlanta, Georgia, July 22, 1864.
    - Battle of Lovejoy's Station, Georgia, August 20, 1864.
  - Franklin–Nashville Campaign September 18–December 27, 1864.
    - Battle of Moon's Station, Georgia, October 3, 1864.
    - Battle of Spring Hill, Tennessee, November 29, 1864.
    - Battle of Franklin, Tennessee, November 30, 1864.
    - Battle of Nashville, Tennessee, December 15–16, 1864.
    - Battle of Sugar Creek, Tennessee, December 26, 1864.
  - Carolinas campaign, February to April 1865.
    - Battle of Bentonville, North Carolina, March 19–21, 1865.

After the Battle of Nashville, Tennessee, the Arkansas regiments of Reynolds' Brigade marched via Bainbridge, Alabama, Tuscumbia, Iuka and Corinth to Tupelo, Mississippi, where they went into camp on January 10, 1865. They departed Tupelo on January 30 and marched to West Point, Mississippi. From West Point they traveled by rail to Selma, Alabama. From Selma they traveled by steamboat to Montgomery, then by rail to Columbus, Georgia. From Columbus they marched via Macon and Milledgeville to Mayfield, Georgia. From Mayfield they traveled by rail to Augusta, Georgia. From there they marched to Newberry, South Carolina. On March 19, 1865, they fought their last major engagement at the Battle of Bentonville, North Carolina. They then marched to Smithfield, North Carolina, where the entire brigade was consolidated into a single understrength regiment, the 1st Consolidated Mounted Rifles on April 9, 1865.

== Consolidation and surrender ==
On April 9, 1865, the depleted Arkansas regiments of D. H. Reynolds' Brigade, Walthall's Division, Confederate Army of Tennessee, were consolidated into a single regiment, the 1st Arkansas Consolidated Mounted Rifles, at Smithfield, North Carolina. The companies of the consolidated regiment were drawn from the following Arkansas regiments:

  - Company A — 1st Arkansas Mounted Rifles.
  - Company B — 1st Arkansas Mounted Rifles.
  - Company C — 2nd Arkansas Mounted Rifles.
  - Company D — 2nd Arkansas Mounted Rifles.
  - Company E — 4th Arkansas Infantry Regiment.
  - Company F — 4th Arkansas Infantry Regiment.
  - Company G — 31st Arkansas Infantry.
  - Company H — 9th Arkansas Infantry.
  - Company I — 9th Arkansas Infantry.
  - Company K — 25th Arkansas Infantry.

The 1st Arkansas Consolidated Mounted Rifles surrendered with the Army of Tennessee at Greensboro, North Carolina, April 26, 1865. The regiment was paroled on May 1, 1865, at Jamestown, North Carolina. After the surrender, the men were offered free rail transportation (where available) in the direction of their homes, by what was left of the Southern railway companies. Most of the men traveled by rail, where they could. A large number of men were killed or seriously injured in a railroad accident at Flat Creek Bridge, Tennessee, on May 25, 1865.

== Colors ==
Regimental Color of the Fourth Arkansas Infantry Regiment (c. 1863)

When the Fourth Arkansas was organized in 1861, it received several new flags, all apparently based on the 1st National Flag of the Confederacy. The following is taken from the Hempstead county newspaper Washington Telegraph:

At an early hour last Wednesday, the Battalion of volunteers under command of Lt. Col McNair took up the line of march for Missouri. It was a splendid sight. The different companies, under the command of their respective officers were marched into town from the camp and formed in front of the Jones Hotel, the Confederate Guards in front. This company was presented with a flag from the ladies of Hempstead County by the hands of Miss Emma Jett...

The Confederate Guards were then marched to the right exposing the Bright Star Rifles from LaFayette County. A beautiful flag was presented to this company by Miss Bettie Etter, through a friend...The flag bore upon its field the legend "Fidelis ad urnam...

During the ceremony, the Hempstead Hornets carried with them their own flag previously presented to them by the ladies of Missouri Township.

Miss Jett's speech ended "'Tis the flag of the South! aye, fling its fold to the kindred breeze, emblem of dread to tyrant hordes, of freedom of the seas! forever may its stars and stripes in cloudless glory wave: Red, White, and Blue--eternal types of nations free and brave" Miss Mollie Pagan presented a flag to the Hempstead Hornets and described it as "the flag of our southern confederacy", probably referring to a first national flag pattern. Colonel McNair was a Hempstead County resident and therefore probably selected a company flag from one of the Hempstead County units as the first 4th Arkansas flag which would be the flag carried by the regiment at the Battle of Pea Ridge and used until they crossed the Mississippi and were issued new colors.

By the time of the Battle of Murfreesboro, the 4th Arkansas had been issued McCown Style battle flag. This was a moderately rectangular banner with a predominantly blue field. The field was crossed with a white St. Andrew's Cross and the entire flag was bordered in white. From battle descriptions it is likely that every regiment of McNair's Arkansas Brigade carried a similar flag. Only one of these flags survived the war, that of the 25th Arkansas Infantry Regiment, which was then known as the 30th Arkansas. The flag of the 25th/30th Arkansas was captured after the color bearer's hand was shot off. It is now in the Old State House Museum in Little Rock. The 4th Arkansas would have carried a similar flag, either with their own markings, or with none at all. There are several post war illustrations of a 4th Arkansas Flag based on the St. Andrew's cross pattern of the Army of Tennessee, but no flag of the 4th Arkansas survived the war.

== Roll of Honor ==
Nine soldiers of the regiment were listed on the Confederate Roll of Honor for their service at Murfreesboro

== See also ==
- List of Confederate units from Arkansas
- Confederate Units by State

== Bibliography ==
- Arkansas Confederate Regimental Histories
- Battle Actions and History of the 4th Arkansas Infantry, CSA
- Bender, Robert P. (ed.), Worthy of the Cause for Which They Fight: The Civil War Diary of Brigadier General Harris Reynolds, 1861–1865. (University of Arkansas Press, 2011), accessed at Google eBooks, https://books.google.com/books?id=H10SkwjYznkC&q=Reynolds+arkansas+brigade ISBN 978-1-55728-971-1.
- Gammage, Washington L., The Camp, the Bivouac, and the Battlefield, Being a History of the Fourth Arkansas Regiment, from its First Organization Down to the Present Date.
- Lavendar, Captain John W. 1837–1921. The War Memoirs of Captain John W. Lavender, CSA The Southern Press, 1956. Sub title:
- Lavender, John. They Never Came Back: The Story of Co. F. Fourth Arkansas Infantry, C.S.A. (Pine Bluff, AR: The Southern Press, 1956).
