= 1st Arkansas Mounted Rifles =

- Active: 1861–1865
- Disbanded: April 26, 1865
- Country: Confederate States
- Allegiance: Arkansas
- Branch: Confederate States Army
- Type: Mounted infantry
- Size: Regiment
- Engagements: American Civil War: Battle of Wilson's Creek; Battle of Pea Ridge; Kentucky Campaign; Battle of Richmond; Battle of Murfreesboro; Vicksburg Campaign; Battle of Jackson; Siege of Jackson; Chickamauga Campaign; Battle of Chickamauga; Meridian Campaign; Battle of Meridian; Atlanta campaign; Battle of Dug Gap; Battle of Resaca; Battle of New Hope Church; Battle of Kennesaw Mountain; Battle of Moore's Hill; Battle of Peachtree Creek; Battle of Atlanta; Battle of Ezra Church; Siege of Atlanta; Battle of Jonesboro; Battle of Lovejoy's Station; Battle of Moon's Station; Franklin–Nashville Campaign; Battle of Franklin; Battle of Nashville; Battle of Sugar Creek; Carolinas campaign; Battle of Bentonville
- Battle honours: Battle of Murfreesboro

Commanders
- Notable commanders: Col. Thomas J. Churchill; Col. Daniel H. Reynolds

1st Arkansas Mounted Rifles (1861–1865) was a Confederate States Army cavalry regiment during the American Civil War. The unit was formed as a mounted infantry regiment, but was dismounted in the spring of 1862 and remained dismounted for the remainder of the war. The unit participated in the earliest battles in the western theater at Wilson's Creek and surrendered with the remnants of the Army of Tennessee in North Carolina in April 1865.

== Formation ==
At the outbreak of the Civil War, Arkansas, formed some 48 infantry regiments, and a number of cavalry units. With the exception of the 3rd Arkansas Infantry Regiment, all of the Arkansas units would sign one year enlistments, thus leading to assignments in what was referred to as the "western theater", due to most of the large scale battles being fought in the east. The 1st Arkansas Mounted Rifles would sign one year enlistments, then later would sign a "three year or the duration of the war" extension.

First organized in Little Rock, Arkansas, on June 16, 1861, the regiment was initially commanded by Colonel Thomas J. Churchill. The regiment was composed of the following volunteer companies:

- Company A – "Chicot Rangers" – commanded by Captain Daniel H. Reynolds. This company was originally organized as a volunteer militia company in the 23rd Regiment, Arkansas State Militia, Chicot County, on October 3, 1860.
- Company B – "Des Arc Rangers" – commanded by Captain John S. Pearson. This company was originally organized as a volunteer militia company in the 50th Regiment, Arkansas State Militia, Prairie County, on June 3, 1861.
- Company C – "Johnson Rifles" – commanded by Captain Oliver Basham. This company was originally organized as a volunteer militia company in the 10th Regiment, Arkansas State Militia, Johnson County, on January 18, 1860.
- Company D – "Augusta Guards" – commanded by Captain Charles H. Matlock. This company was originally organized as a volunteer militia company in the 34th Regiment, Arkansas State Militia, Jackson County, on December 28, 1860.
- Company E – "Lawrence County Rifles" – commanded by Captain Zachariah P. McAlexander. This company was originally organized as a volunteer militia company in the 60th Regiment, Arkansas State Militia, Jackson County, on May 8, 1861.
- Company F – "Pulaski Rangers" – commanded by Captain Thomas James Churchill|Thomas J. Churchill. This company was originally organized as a volunteer militia company in the 13th Regiment, Arkansas State Militia, Pulaski County, on March 16, 1860.
- Company G – "Napoleon Rifles" – commanded by Captain John L. Porter. This company was originally organized as a volunteer militia company in the 6th Regiment, Arkansas State Militia, Desha County, on March 7, 1861.
- Company H – "Yell County Rifles" – commanded by Captain Thomas J. Daniel. This company was originally organized as a volunteer militia company in the 26th Regiment, Arkansas State Militia, Yell County, on May 6, 1861.
- Company I – "McCulloch Rangers" – commanded by Captain Robert W. Harper. This company was originally organized as a volunteer militia company in the 4th Regiment, Arkansas State Militia, Conway County, on May 1, 1861.
- Company K – "Independence County Rifles" – commanded by Captain William E. Gibbs. This company was from Batesville in Independence County.

== Battles ==
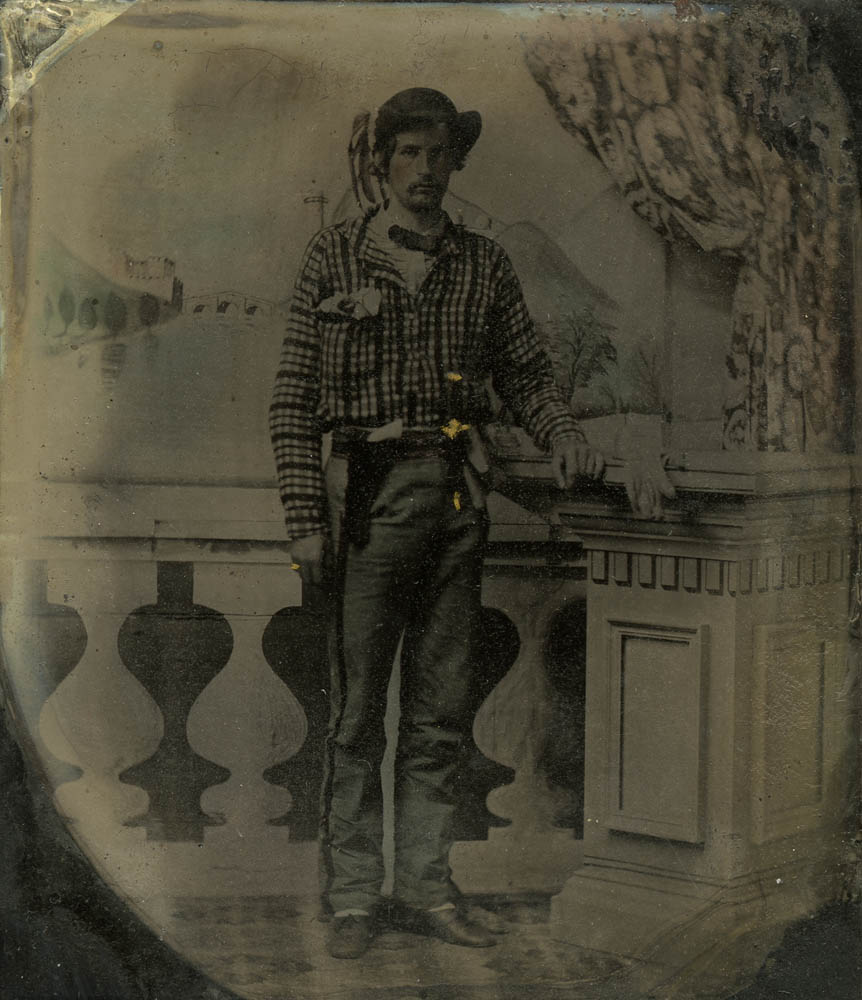
Second Lieutenant David Alexander of the "Napoleon Rifles," c. June, 1861.

The regiment was first attached to General Benjamin McCulloch's Brigade. By August, they were on the move toward Springfield, Missouri, where they first saw action in the Battle of Wilson's Creek. It reported 45 killed, 161 wounded, and 2 missing at Wilson's Creek. Following that battle, the regiment was dispatched to Indian Territory to battle the Native American pro-Union Cherokee soldiers. They served in that capacity from September through October 1861.

On March 6, 1862, the regiment was engaged during the Battle of Pea Ridge, as part of Colonel Louis Hébert, Brigade of Brigadier General Benjamin McCulloch's Division of Major General Earl Van Dorn's Army of the West. The McNair's Brigade reconsolidated at Van Buren, Arkansas, then marched overland to Des Arc where the regiment was transported by steamboat to Memphis in an attempt to unite the Army of the West with the Confederate Army of Mississippi to attack Grant at Pittsburg Landing, Tennessee, but arrived too late for the Battle of Shiloh. Just before departing Arkansas, the regiment was dismounted and fought the remainder of the war as infantry. The regiment deeply resented being forced to give up their horses and continuously requested to be allowed to resume their place as a mounted command.

In early May 1862 the Confederate forces underwent an army-wide reorganization due to the passage of the Conscription Act by the Confederate Congress in April 1862. All twelve-month regiments had to re-muster and enlist for two additional years or the duration of the war; a new election of officers was ordered; and men who were exempted from service by age or other reasons under the Conscription Act were allowed to take a discharge and go home. Officers who did not choose to stand for re-election were also offered a discharge. The reorganization was accomplished among all the Arkansas regiments in and around Corinth, Mississippi, following the Battle of Shiloh.

In June 1862, the regiment was in camp near Tupelo, Mississippi, along with other Arkansas regiments. Dozens of Arkansas soldiers died of disease in the camp hospital during this period, and many more were discharged for disability.

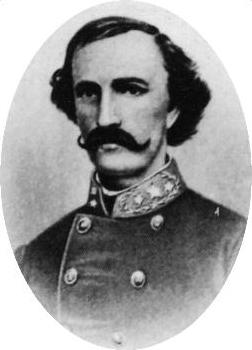
Thomas J. Churchill

During the Kentucky Campaign, McNair's brigade was assigned to Churchill's Division, under the overall command of General Kirby Smith. General Smith pushed rapidly into the bluegrass region of Kentucky, and defeated the Union army at the Battle of Richmond. In the desperate battle that occurred there, McNair's brigade turned the enemy's right and contributed to the rout that followed. The 1st Arkansas Mounted Rifles, (dismounted), reported 23 casualties at the Battle of Richmond.

On November 4, 1862, Colonel McNair was commissioned brigadier-general. His brigade included the following Arkansas units, the 1st and 2nd Arkansas Mounted Rifles (dismounted), 4th and 13th Arkansas Infantry Regiments, 4th Arkansas Infantry Battalion, and Humphreys' battery of artillery. On the same day, Henry Gaston Bunn was elected Colonel of the 4th Arkansas as the replacement for Brigadier General McNair.

During the Battle of Murfreesboro, Tennessee, on December 21, 1862, McNair's brigade took part in the brilliant charge of McCown's division, which, aided by the Divisions of Withers and Cheatham, drove the Federal right a distance of between three and four miles, bending it back upon the center, until the line was at right angles to its original position. The 4th Arkansas lost another 79 casualties at Murfreesboro. In accordance with Confederate Adjutant and Inspector General's Office Order Number 131, ten soldiers of the regiment were recognized for courage and good conduct on the field for the Battle of Murfreesboro The regiment reported a total of 9 killed, 82 wounded and 4 missing during the Battle of Murfreesboro.

In June, 1863, McNair’s Brigade was reassigned to Walker's (later French's) division of the Army of the Department of Mississippi and Eastern Louisiana, under the overall command of General Joseph E. Johnston who was assigned the mission of organizing a force to attempt to relieve General Pemberton’s besieged army at Vicksburg. Johnston had been gathering troops at Jackson, intending to relieve pressure on Lt. Gen. John C. Pemberton's beleaguered garrison. Johnston cautiously advanced his 30,000 soldiers toward the rear of Grant's army surrounding Vicksburg. In response, Grant ordered Sherman to deal with Johnston's threat. By July 1, 1863, Johnston's force was in position along the Big Black River. Sherman used the newly arrived IX Corps to counter this threat. On July 5, the day after the surrender of Vicksburg was made official; Sherman was free to move against Johnston. Johnston hastily withdrew his force across the Big Black River and Champion's Hill battlefields with Sherman in pursuit. Sherman had with him the IX Corps, XV Corps, XIII Corps, and a detachment of the XVI Corps. On July 10 the Union Army had taken up position around Jackson. The heaviest fighting in the Siege of Jackson came on July 11 during an unsuccessful Union attack, which resulted in heavy casualties. Instead of risking entrapment, Johnston chose to evacuate the state capital and withdrew on July 16. Sherman's forces occupied the city the following day.

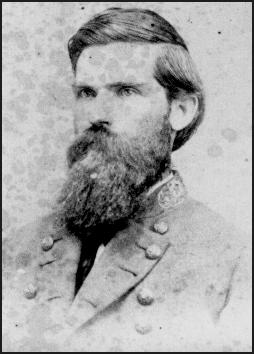
Daniel H. Reynolds

In the aftermath of the Vicksburg Campaign most of Johnston’s army was transferred back to the Army of Tennessee. At the Battle of Chickamauga, McNair's was one of the eight brigades which, under Lieutenant General James Longstreet's direction, rushed through the gap in the Federal line and put one wing of the Union army to rout. In the battle McNair was wounded and the brigade as a whole suffered heavy casualties. Of the 254 soldiers who saw action at Chickamauga, forty-two percent were disabled. . Following McNair's injury, Colonel Daniel H. Reynolds of the 1st Arkansas Mounted Rifles assumed command of the Brigade. Reynolds would lead the brigade for the remainder of the war.

Following the Battle of Chickamauga, NcNair's Brigade. now under the command of Colonel Reynolds, moved back to central Mississippi to oppose General Sherman's Meridian Campaign. Sherman organized an expedition of 20,000 men to move into central Mississippi to break up Confederate rail communications and other infrastructure near Meridian Mississippi, and solidify Union control of the Mississippi River. The Meridian campaign was a "dress rehearsal" for the style of war against infrastructure that Sherman, as well as some of these very troops, would later practice in Georgia. To counter the threat, Confederate President Jefferson Davis ordered troops to the area from other localities, including McNair's Brigade. The Confederate commander in the area, Lieutenant General Leonidas Polk, consolidated a number of commands in and around Morton, Mississippi, but failed to stop Sherman's moves. Meridian was essentially destroy by Sherman and most of Polks forces were transferred to the Army of Tennessee in time to oppose Sherman's Atlanta Campaign. Colonel D. H. Reynolds was promoted to brigadier general on March 12, 1864, retroactive to March 5, 1864.

Through the summer and fall of 1864 the 1st Arkansas Mounted Rifles (dismounted) and the rest of their brigade, participated in the Atlanta campaign through Georgia as a part of the force attempting to stop Sherman. After the fall of Atlanta, the 4th Arkansas along with the rest of the army, now under the command of General John Bell Hood, moved back to Tennessee, where they fought at the Battle of Franklin and the Battle of Nashville. The unit is entitled to the following Campaign Participation Credits: The unit is entitled to the following Campaign Participation Credits:

- Battle of Wilson's Creek, Missouri, August 10, 1861.
- Battle of Pea Ridge, Arkansas, March 6–8, 1862.
- Siege of Corinth, Mississippi, April to June 1862.
- Kentucky Campaign, Kentucky, August–October 1862.
  - Battle of Richmond, Kentucky, August 29–30, 1862.
  - Battle of Perryville, Kentucky, October 8, 1862.
- Battle of Murfreesboro, Tennessee, December 31, 1862, to January 3, 1863.
- Vicksburg Campaign
  - Battle of Jackson, Mississippi, May 14, 1863.
  - Siege of Jackson, Mississippi, July 5–25, 1863.
- Chickamauga Campaign
  - Battle of Chickamauga, Georgia, September 19–20, 1863.
- Meridian Campaign
  - Battle of Meridian, Mississippi, February 14–20, 1864.
- Atlanta campaign, May to September 1864.
  - Battle of Dug Gap, Georgia, September 10–11, 1863.
  - Battle of Resaca, Georgia, May 14–15, 1864.
  - Battle of New Hope Church, Georgia, May 25 – June 4, 1864.
  - Battle of Pickett's Mill, Georgina, May 27, 1864
  - Battle of Kennesaw Mountain, Georgia, June 27, 1864.
  - Battle of Moore's Hill, Georgia, July 28, 1862.
  - Battle of Peachtree Creek, Georgia, July 20, 1864.
  - Siege of Atlanta, Georgia, July 22, 1864.
  - Battle of Lovejoy's Station, Georgia, August 20, 1864.
- Franklin–Nashville Campaign September 18 to December 27, 1864.
  - Battle of Moon's Station, Georgia, October 3, 1864.
  - Battle of Spring Hill, Tennessee, November 29, 1864.
  - Battle of Franklin, Tennessee, November 30, 1864.
  - Battle of Nashville, Tennessee, December 15–16, 1864.
  - Battle of Sugar Creek, Tennessee, December 26, 1864.
- Carolinas campaign, February to April 1865.
  - Battle of Bentonville, North Carolina, March 19–21, 1865.

After the Battle of Nashville, Tennessee, the Arkansas regiments of Reynolds' Brigade marched via Bainbridge, Alabama, Tuscumbia, Iuka and Corinth to Tupelo, Mississippi, where they went into camp on January 10, 1865. They departed Tupelo on January 30 and marched to West Point, Mississippi. From West Point they traveled by rail to Selma, Alabama. From Selma they traveled by steamboat to Montgomery, then by rail to Columbus, Georgia. From Columbus they marched via Macon and Milledgeville to Mayfield, Georgia. From Mayfield they traveled by rail to Augusta, Georgia. From there they marched to Newberry, South Carolina. On March 19, 1865, they fought their last major engagement at the Battle of Bentonville, North Carolina. They then marched to Smithfield, North Carolina, where the entire brigade was consolidated into a single understrength regiment, the 1st Consolidated Mounted Rifles on April 9, 1865.

== Consolidation and Surrender ==
On April 9, 1865, the depleted Arkansas regiments of D. H. Reynolds' Brigade, Walthall's Division, Confederate Army of Tennessee, were consolidated into a single regiment the 1st Arkansas Consolidated Mounted Rifles, at Smithfield, North Carolina. The companies of the consolidated regiment were consolidated from the following Arkansas regiments:

- Company A — 1st Arkansas Mounted Rifles.
- Company B — 1st Arkansas Mounted Rifles.
- Company C — 2nd Arkansas Mounted Rifles.
- Company D — 2nd Arkansas Mounted Rifles.
- Company E — 4th Arkansas Infantry Regiment.
- Company F — 4th Arkansas Infantry.
- Company G — 31st Arkansas Infantry.
- Company H — 9th Arkansas Infantry.
- Company I — 9th Arkansas Infantry.
- Company K — 25th Arkansas Infantry.

The 1st Arkansas Consolidated Mounted Rifles surrendered with the Army of Tennessee at Greensboro, North Carolina, April 26, 1865. The 1st Arkansas Consolidated Mounted Rifles was paroled on May 1, 1865, at Jamestown, North Carolina.

After the surrender, the men were offered free rail transportation (where available) in the direction of their homes, by what was left of the Southern railway companies. Most of the men traveled by rail, where they could. A large number of men were killed or seriously injured in a railroad accident at Flat Creek Bridge, Tennessee, on May 25, 1865.

== Roll of Honor ==
Ten soldiers were cited on the Confederate Roll of Honor for their actions at the Battle of Murfreesboro.

== See also ==
- List of Confederate units from Arkansas
- Confederate Units by State

== Bibliography ==
- Bender, Robert Patrick (ed.), Worthy of the Cause for Which They Fight: The Civil War Diary of Brigadier General Daniel Harris Reynolds, 1861-1865. (University of Arkansas Press, 2011), accessed at Google eBooks, https://books.google.com/books?id=H10SkwjYznkC&q=Reynolds+arkansas+brigade ISBN 978-1-55728-971-1.
- Dacus, Robert H. (1972) [1897]. Reminiscences of Company H, First Arkansas Mounted Rifles. Dayton, Ohio: Morningside Bookshop.
