= Luther Prentice Bradley =

American soldier and Union general

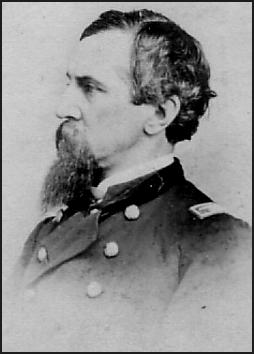
- Col. Luther Prentice Bradley
- Born: December 8, 1822; New Haven, Connecticut, US
- Died: March 13, 1910 (aged 87); Tacoma, Washington, US
- Burial place: Arlington National Cemetery
- Military career
- Allegiance: United States; Union
- Branch: United States Army; Union Army
- Service years: 1861–1865, 1866–1886
- Rank: Brigadier general
- Commands: 51st Illinois Volunteer Infantry Regiment; 13th Infantry Regiment
- Conflicts: American Civil War

Luther Prentice Bradley (December 8, 1822 – March 13, 1910) was an American soldier who served as a Union general officer during the American Civil War.

== Early life ==
Bradley was born in New Haven, Connecticut on December 8, 1822. He held various commands in Connecticut militia, where he acquired basic military education. He served as a lieutenant in the Connecticut militia for a short time, but his mother opposed this because he was her only son. In 1855, he moved to Chicago, Illinois, and entered the book business. Also Bradley was a captain in the 1st Illinois Militia and later a lieutenant colonel of the "Chicago Legion".

== Civil War ==
When the American Civil War began in 1861, Bradley chose to enlist in the Union cause. At first his mother opposed this, but he wrote her a letter in which he told of his need to serve in the military for his country. He was appointed a lieutenant colonel in the 51st Illinois Infantry Regiment on November 6.

Under Maj. Gen. Don Carlos Buell, he fought with his regiment at the capture of Island Number Ten in New Madrid, Missouri, and at the occupation of Nashville, Tennessee. On October 15, 1862, he was promoted to colonel, and then he participated in the Battle of Stones River that winter. He was severely wounded during the September 1863 Battle of Chickamauga where he commanded a brigade.

Bradley was then appointed a brigadier general in the Union Army, to rank from July 30, 1864. He participated in the Atlanta campaign, during which he commanded a brigade in Newton's Division of IV Corps in the Army of the Cumberland. Bradley fought in Tennessee at the Battle of Spring Hill on November 28, 1864, and was once again wounded. His injury prevented him from leading his brigade during the Battle of Nashville that followed on December 15–16.

== Postbellum ==
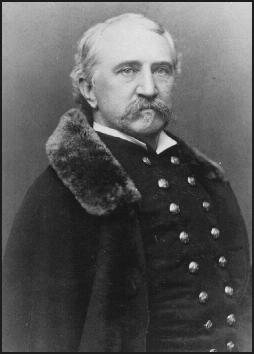
Bradley in later life

Bradley left the volunteer army at the end of the Civil War in 1865. He was appointed Lieutenant Colonel of the newly formed 27th US Infantry on July 28, 1866. He married Ione Dewey in 1867. He became Colonel in 1879. Dewey accompanied him to various locations in the Indian Country from the beginning of their marriage until 1886. He was involved in the construction of several western forts used during the Indian Wars. He also attended the Centennial Exposition in 1876 as an official attendee for the Army. In 1874, he oversaw the construction of Camp, later Fort, Robinson in the Nebraska Territory, where he ordered the arrest of Crazy Horse, which then led to Crazy Horse being killed in the ensuing altercation at the Fort in 1877.

Bradley retired on December 8, 1886, after he reached the then-statutory age of 64. He died at Tacoma, Washington in 1910, and is buried in Section 2 of Arlington National Cemetery in Arlington, Virginia.

== See also ==
- List of American Civil War generals (Union)
