= 9th Arkansas Infantry Regiment =

Infantry regiment of the Confederate States Army

Ninth Arkansas Infantry Regiment
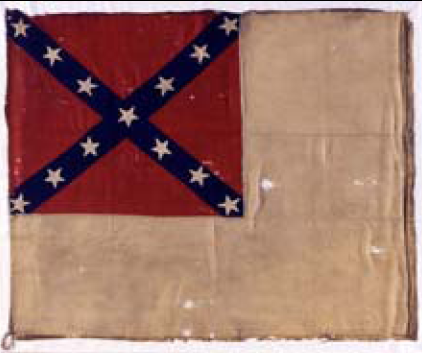
- National color of the Ninth Arkansas at the American Civil War Museum in Richmond, Virginia
- Active: 1861–1865
- Disbanded: April 26, 1865
- Country: Confederate States
- Allegiance: Arkansas
- Branch: Army
- Type: Infantry
- Size: Regiment
- Nickname: "Ninth Arkansas"
- Facings: Light blue
- Engagements: American Civil War: Siege of Corinth; Vicksburg Bombardments; Iuka-Corinth Campaign; Second Battle of Corinth; Battle of Coffeeville; Vicksburg Campaign; Battle of Champion Hill; Siege of Jackson; Meridian Campaign; Atlanta campaign; Battle of Resaca; Battle of New Hope Church; Battle of Pickett's Mill; Battle of Kennesaw Mountain; Battle of Dug Gap; Battle of Peachtree Creek; Battle of Atlanta; Battle of Ezra Church; Siege of Atlanta; Battle of Lovejoy's Station; Battle of Jonesboro; Franklin–Nashville Campaign; Battle of Franklin; Battle of Nashville; Battle of Sugar Creek; Carolinas campaign; Battle of Bentonville

The 9th Arkansas Infantry Regiment (also known as the "Ninth Arkansas") was a regiment of the Confederate States Army during the American Civil War. It served in the Western Theater, seeing action in the Vicksburg, Tennessee and Georgia campaigns. Due to attrition; the 9th Arkansas was consolidated several times with other Arkansas regiments, finally merging in 1865 into the 1st Arkansas Consolidated Mounted Rifles.

== Organization ==
The 9th Arkansas was organized at Pine Bluff, Arkansas, July 20, 1861, and was known as the "Parson's Regiment" because it contained forty-two ministers. Its companies were recruited in the following counties: The unit contained four companies (A, G, H, and I) which were originally organized as volunteer companies in the 24th Regiment, Arkansas State Militia.

- Company A, the "Bradley Guards" of Jefferson County, commanded by John M. Bradley. This unit was originally organized as a volunteer company in the 24th Regiment, Arkansas State Militia. The unit organized at Grapevine, Arkansas, on June 9, 1861, and mustered into Confederate service at Pine Bluff, Arkansas, on July 25, 1861, for twelve months’ service.
- Company B (old), the "Cut-Off Guards", of Drew County, commanded by Captain William H. Isom. the unit organized at Cut-Off, Arkansas, and mustered into Confederate service at Pine Bluff, Arkansas, on July 25, 1861, for twelve months’ service. Due to losses incurred at the Battle of Shiloh, the company was disbanded on April 17, 1862, and its members distributed among other companies of the regiment.
- Company B (new), the "Confederate Grays", of Drew County, commanded by Captain Simon B. Thomasson.
- Company C, the "Henry Hornets, of Jefferson County, commanded by Captain Philip G. Henry. the unit was organized at Pine Bluff, Arkansas, on July 12, 1861, and mustered into Confederate service on July 25, 1861, for twelve months’ service.
- Company D, of Bradley County, commanded by Captain William Y. McCammon. The unit was organized at Warren, Arkansas, and mustered into Confederate service at Pine Bluff, Arkansas, on July 25, 1861, for twelve months’ service.
- Company E, of Bradley County, commanded by Captain John W. Blankenship. The unit was organized at Lanark, Arkansas, and mustered into Confederate service at Pine Bluff, Arkansas, on July 25, 1861, for twelve months’ service.
- Company F, the "Dixie Guards", of Drew County, commanded by Captain William C. Haislip. The unit was organized at Monticello, Arkansas, and mustered into Confederate service at Pine Bluff, Arkansas, on July 25, 1861, for twelve months’ service.
- Company G, the "Arkansas Travellers", of Jefferson County, commanded by Captain Robert M. Wallace. This unit was originally organized on June 24, 1861, as a volunteer company in the 24th Regiment, Arkansas State Militia. Organized at New London, Arkansas, and mustered into Confederate service at Pine Bluff, Arkansas, on July 27, 1861, for twelve months’ service.
- Company H, the "Hardee Guards", of Jefferson County, commanded by Captain James T. Armstrong. This unit was originally organized as a volunteer company in the 24th Regiment, Arkansas State Militia. Organized at Plum Bayou, Arkansas, and mustered into Confederate service at Pine Bluff, Arkansas, on July 27, 1861, for twelve months’ service.
- Company I (old), the "McCulloch Guards", of Jefferson County, commanded by Captain George W. Bayne. This unit was originally organized on June 24, 1861, as a volunteer company in the 24th Regiment, Arkansas State Militia.
- Company I (new), the "Osceola Hornets", of Mississippi County, commanded by Captain Charles Bowen. This unit was organized at Osceola, Arkansas; mustered into Confederate service at Memphis, Tennessee, on August 10, 1861, for twelve months’ service; and assigned as Co. G, 2nd Confederate Infantry. The company was transferred to 9th Arkansas Infantry as (new) Co. I in May 1862.
- Company K, of Ashley County, commanded by Captain John F. Carr. The unit was organized at Hamburg, Arkansas, on July 29, 1861, and mustered into Confederate service at Camp Lee, Pine Bluff, Arkansas, on August 9, 1861, for twelve months’ service.

The field officers were Colonels John M. Bradley and Isaac L. Dunlop; Lieutenant Colonels W. Y. McCammon, R. W. Millsap, and Jefferson W. Rogers; and Majors John C. Bratton and William J. Wallace.

The regiment was armed with weapons which the state confiscated when the Federal Arsenal at Little Rock was seized by Arkansas State Militia troops in February 1861. Disposition of the weapons found in the Arsenal is somewhat sketchy, but from various records it can be surmised The 9th and 10th Arkansas, Kelly's 9th Arkansas Battalion, and the 3rd Arkansas Cavalry were issued flintlock Hall's Rifles from the Arsenal.

== Battles ==
The 9th Arkansas marched to Pocahontas, Arkansas, in July 1861 and later was initially assigned to Pillow's Division. Like all the other Arkansas regiments raised in the first wave of recruiting in 1861, they were taken into Confederate armies east of the Mississippi River, and only the few survivors made it back home after the war. The 9th was present, across the river at Columbus Kentucky during the Battle of Belmont, Missouri and was subsequently retained at Bowling Green, Kentucky, for the defense of that post during the winter of 1861-1862. The regiment was assigned to General Bowen's Brigade, consisting of the 9th and 10th Arkansas, 5th Missouri and 10th Mississippi Infantry Regiments before they were moved to Kentucky. They remained at Bowling Green, Kentucky, until the evacuation of that place when they were placed to guard the rear on the retreat. After the losses of Fort Henry and Fort Donelson in February 1862, Confederate General Albert Sidney Johnston withdrew his forces into western Tennessee, northern Mississippi, and Alabama to reorganize. and then retreated through western Tennessee to Corinth, Mississippi. On March 29, 1862, the Army of Central Kentucky was merged into the Army of Mississippi in preparation for the Battle of Shiloh. Bowen's Brigade, including the 9th and 10th Arkansas Infantry Regiments, was then placed in General Brigadier General John C. Breckinridge's Reserve Corps as part of the Army of Mississippi. It fought gallantly at Shiloh, charging repeatedly upon the "Hornet's Nest" where it lost Lieutenant Colonel Dunlop. It was through this regiment that General Albert Sidney Johnston rode from the rear to the front, with a tin cup he had appropriated earlier that morning, saying "Men of Arkansas, the enemy is stubborn. I want you to show General Beauregard and General Bragg what you can do with your bayonets and toothpicks!" The regiment went forward with a cheer and passed him at a run; in five minutes 130 men of their ranks were killed or wounded, but they did not falter. Lieutenant Duckworth was killed at the head of his company, and Captain Wallace was wounded. It closed up and disappeared into the thicket in front, followed by the whole Confederate line, and the enemy was silenced in twenty minutes. General Johnston, however, received a mortal wound while leading this charge, and shortly thereafter bled to death. The unit reported 17 killed and 115 wounded at Shiloh.

After the retreat from Shiloh, the 9th Arkansas returned to Corinth, Mississippi and participated in the Iuka-Corinth Campaign, in the battles of Corinth, and Iuka, Mississippi. They served at the Battle of Coffeeville, where the unit reported 16 casualties. The unit was assigned under Generals Rust, Buford, and Beall in the Department of Mississippi and East Louisiana and in the Vicksburg Campaign in the spring and summer of 1863, where they served briefly in the garrisons of Port Hudson, Louisiana, and Jackson, Mississippi, then fought in the Battle of Champion Hill on May 15, 1863. The 9th served in Brigadier General Abraham Buford's brigade of Major General William W. Loring's division of Lieutenant General John C. Pemberton's Confederate Army at Champion Hill, and following that battle, Loring retreated north to join General Joseph E. Johnston's army near Jackson rather than being trapped with the rest of Pemberton's army in the Vicksburg defenses. Johnston had been gathering troops at Jackson, intending to relieve pressure on Lt. Gen. John C. Pemberton's beleaguered garrison. Johnston cautiously advanced his 30,000 soldiers toward the rear of Grant's army surrounding Vicksburg. In response, Grant ordered Sherman to deal with Johnston's threat. By July 1, 1863, Johnston's force was in position along the Big Black River. Sherman used the newly arrived IX Corps to counter this threat. On July 5, the day after the surrender of Vicksburg was made official; Sherman was free to move against Johnston. Johnston hastily withdrew his force across the Big Black River and Champion's Hill battlefields with Sherman in pursuit. Sherman had with him the IX Corps, XV Corps, XIII Corps, and a detachment of the XVI Corps. On July 10 the Union Army had taken up position around Jackson. The heaviest fighting in the Siege of Jackson came on July 11 during an unsuccessful Union attack, which resulted in heavy casualties. Instead of risking entrapment, Johnston chose to evacuate the state capital and withdrew on July 16. Sherman's forces occupied the city the following day.

In the aftermath of the Vicksburg Campaign, most of Johnston's army was transferred to the Army of Tennessee, arriving just in time for the Battle of Chickamauga. The 9th Arkansas remained in the Department of Mississippi and East Louisiana and was eventually assigned to the mostly Alabama brigade of Brigadier General Abraham Buford, of Major General William J. Loring's Division of Lieutenant General Leonidas Polk's Army during the Meridian Campaign in February to March, 1864.

After the Meridian Campaign, the unit was assigned to Brigadier General D. H. Reynold's Brigade in the Army of Tennessee, where it would remain for the rest of the war. The unit participated in the campaigns of that army from the Atlanta Campaign at Resaca, New Hope Church, Kennesaw Mountain, Dug Gap, Peachtree Creek, Atlanta, Ezra Church, and the final siege of Atlanta, as well as follow-on action at Lovejoy's Station and Jonesboro, Georgia. After the fall of Atlanta, the regiment participated in the Tennessee campaign that resulted in the battles of Franklin, and Nashville, Tennessee.

They continued service with the Army of Tennessee to the close of the war, fighting at Sugar Creek on December 26, 1864, and in the Carolinas Campaign in February to April, 1865. The unit participated in the following battles:

- Battle of Shiloh, Tennessee, April 6–7, 1862.
- Siege of Corinth, Mississippi, April 29 to May 30, 1862
- Iuka-Corinth Campaign
  - Second Battle of Corinth, Mississippi, October 3–4, 1862
  - Battle of Coffeeville, Mississippi, December 5, 1862
- Vicksburg Campaign Mississippi, December 26, 1862, to July 4, 1863
  - Battle of Champion Hill, Mississippi, May 15, 1863
  - Siege of Jackson, Mississippi, July 10, 1863
- Meridian Campaign, Mississippi, February 1864
- Atlanta campaign, May to September 1864.
  - Battle of Rocky Face Ridge, Georgia, May 5–11, 1864.
  - Battle of Resaca, Georgia, May 14–15, 1864.
  - Battle of New Hope Church, Georgia, May 25 - June 4, 1864.
  - Battle of Pickett's Mill, Georgina, May 27, 1864.
  - Battle of Kennesaw Mountain, Georgia, June 27, 1864.
  - Battle of Peachtree Creek, Georgia, July 20, 1864.
  - Siege of Atlanta, Georgia, July 22, 1864.
  - Battle of Ezra Church, Georgia, July 28, 1864.
  - Battle of Jonesboro, Georgia, August 31 to September 1, 1864.
- Franklin–Nashville Campaign September 18 to December 27, 1864
  - Battle of Spring Hill, Tennessee, November 29, 1864.
  - Battle of Franklin, Tennessee, November 30, 1864.
  - Battle of Nashville, Tennessee, December 15–16, 1864.
- Carolinas campaign, February to April 1865.
  - Battle of Bentonville, North Carolina, March 19–21, 1865.

After the Battle of Nashville, Tennessee, the Arkansas regiments of Reynolds' Brigade marched via Bainbridge, Alabama, Tuscumbia, Iuka and Corinth to Tupelo, Mississippi, where they went into camp on January 10, 1865. They departed Tupelo on January 30 and marched to West Point, Mississippi. From West Point they traveled by rail to Selma, Alabama. From Selma they traveled by steamboat to Montgomery, then by rail to Columbus, Georgia. From Columbus they marched via Macon and Milledgeville to Mayfield, Georgia. From Mayfield they traveled by rail to Augusta, Georgia. From there they marched to Newberry, South Carolina. On March 19, 1865, they fought their last major engagement at the Battle of Bentonville, North Carolina. They then marched to Smithfield, North Carolina, where the entire brigade was consolidated into a single understrength regiment, the 1st Consolidated Mounted Rifles on April 9, 1865.

== Regimental colors ==
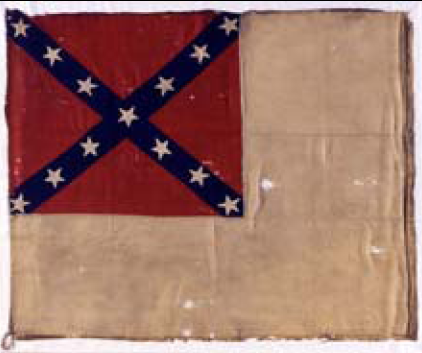
Colors of the 9th Arkansas Infantry

The regimental colors currently reside at the American Civil War Museum at Richmond, Virginia. It is a second Confederate national flag pattern. According to its history, the colors were preserved by regimental color bearer Degan Foley and given to Reverend J. M. Lucey of Pine Bluff, who donated it to the Richmond museum in 1896.

The Old State House Museum at Little Rock has regimental colors formerly attributed to the 9th Arkansas Volunteers. A variation of the first national flag with twelve stars, nine describing a circle and three within it. Research now indicates that this flag most likely belonged to the 11th Arkansas Volunteers and was found, along with the regiment's baggage in Fort Thompson after the unit evacuated Island No. 10. That regimental color was returned to Arkansas by the State of Michigan in 1941. It is a first Confederate national flag pattern variation made of cotton and cotton damask, measuring 46" x 69" and is currently in the possession of the Old State House.

== Consolidation and surrender ==
On April 9, 1865, the depleted Arkansas regiments of D. H. Reynolds' Brigade, Walthall's Division, Confederate Army of Tennessee, were consolidated into a single regiment the 1st Arkansas Consolidated Mounted Rifles, at Smithfield, North Carolina. The companies of the consolidated regiment were drawn from the following Arkansas regiments:

Company A — 1st Arkansas Mounted Rifles.
Company B — 1st Arkansas Mounted Rifles.
Company C — 2nd Arkansas Mounted Rifles.
Company D — 2nd Arkansas Mounted Rifles.
Company E — 4th Arkansas Infantry Regiment.
Company F — 4th Arkansas Infantry Regiment.
Company G — 31st Arkansas Infantry.
Company H — 9th Arkansas Infantry.
Company I — 9th Arkansas Infantry.
Company K — 25th Arkansas Infantry.

The 1st Arkansas Consolidated Mounted Rifles surrendered with the Army of Tennessee at Greensboro, North Carolina, April 26, 1865. The regiment was paroled on May 1, 1865, at Jamestown, North Carolina. After the surrender, the men were offered free rail transportation (where available) in the direction of their homes, by what was left of the Southern railway companies. Most of the men traveled by rail, where they could. A large number of men were killed or seriously injured in a railroad accident at Flat Creek Bridge, Tennessee, on May 25, 1865.

== See also ==
- List of Confederate units from Arkansas
- Confederate Units by State

== Bibliography ==
- Bender, Robert Patrick (ed.), Worthy of the Cause for Which They Fight: The Civil War Diary of Brigadier General Daniel Harris Reynolds, 1861-1865. (University of Arkansas Press, 2011), accessed at Google eBooks, https://books.google.com/books?id=H10SkwjYznkC&q=Reynolds+arkansas+brigade ISBN 978-1-55728-971-1.
- Gammage, Washington L., The Camp, the Bivouac, and the Battlefield, Being a History of the Fourth Arkansas Regiment, from its First Organization Down to the Present Date.
- Willis, James, Arkansas Confederates in the Western Theater. (Morningside Bookshop, 1998), ISBN 9780890293331.
