= Evander McNair =

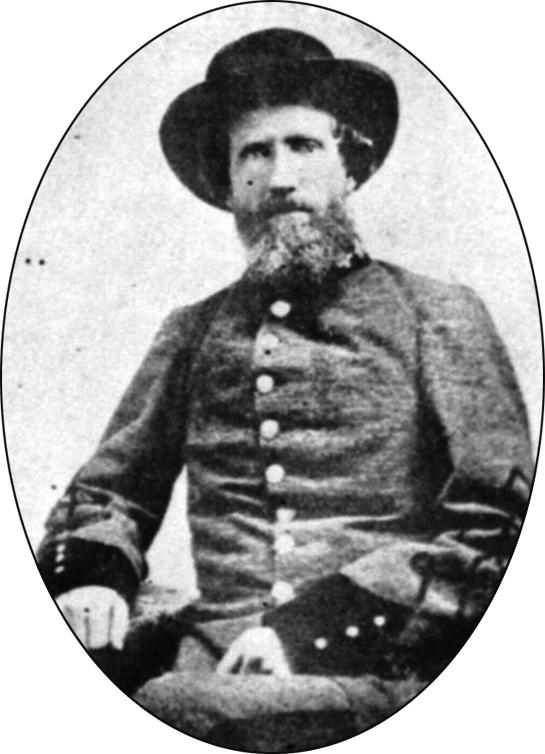
- Born: April 15, 1820; Laurel Hill, North Carolina
- Died: November 13, 1902 (aged 82); Hattiesburg, Mississippi
- Burial place: Magnolia, Mississippi
- Military career
- Allegiance: United States; Confederate States of America
- Branch: United States Volunteers; Confederate States Army
- Service years: 1846–1848; 1861–1865
- Rank: Brigadier General
- Units: Mississippi Rifles
- Commands: 4th Arkansas Infantry Regiment; McNair's Brigade
- Conflicts: Mexican–American War; American Civil War

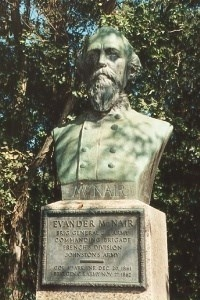
Bronze bust of McNair by Anton Schaaf at Vicksburg National Military Park, 1915

Evander McNair (April 15, 1820 – November 13, 1902) was a brigadier general in the Confederate States Army during the American Civil War.

== Early life ==
Evander McNair was born at Laurel Hill in Scotland County, North Carolina. His parents moved to Simpson County, Mississippi soon after his birth.

In his early twenties McNair opened a mercantile business in Jackson, Mississippi. During the Mexican War McNair joined the 1st Mississippi Rifles under the command of Colonel Jefferson Davis, who would later become President of the Confederacy.

In 1856 McNair moved to Washington, Arkansas, and continued his business there until Arkansas seceded from the Union. McNair raised seven companies of infantry which was augmented with other volunteers and designated the 4th Arkansas Infantry.

== Military service ==
Evander McNair became colonel of the 4th Arkansas Infantry Regiment on August 17, 1861. He led his unit into battle first at the Battle of Wilson's Creek in southwest Missouri and later at the Battle of Pea Ridge. When General Benjamin McCulloch was killed and Colonel Louis Hébert was captured, McNair became the commander of the brigade.

Soon after the Battle of Pea Ridge McNair and his brigade were transferred east of the Mississippi River. McNair's brigade was sent to General Edmund Kirby Smith for his invasion of Kentucky and fought at the Battle of Richmond.

On November 4, 1862, McNair received his commission as Brigadier General. Several other units were folded into his brigade including the 1st and 2nd Arkansas Mounted Rifles (dismounted), the 4th Arkansas Infantry Regiment, 30th Arkansas Infantry Regiment, 4th Arkansas Infantry Battalion, and Humphrey's Arkansas Artillery Battery.

On December 31, 1862, McNair and his troops participated in McCown's charge on the Union right at the Battle of Stones River near Murfreesboro, Tennessee. In May 1863 McNair and his division were sent to reinforce General Joseph E. Johnston’s "Army of Relief", a makeshift Confederate force gathered around Jackson and Canton, Mississippi for the relief of the siege at Vicksburg, Mississippi and McNair participated in the Jackson expedition around Jackson, Mississippi .

At the Battle of Chickamauga McNair's brigade participated in exploiting the break in the Union lines that turned the battle for the Confederates. During the fierce fighting McNair was wounded and both he and his brigade were sent to Mississippi for recuperation. In 1864 McNair was transferred to the Trans-Mississippi Department where he served for the remainder of the war.

== Postbellum ==
After the conflict McNair moved to New Orleans and later to Hattiesburg, Mississippi and Magnolia, Mississippi.

Evander McNair died at Hattiesburg, Mississippi, and is buried at Magnolia Cemetery in Magnolia. His wife, Hannah Merrill McNair, a New York Yankee, preceded him in death in 1878 and is buried next to him.

== See also ==
- List of American Civil War generals (Confederate)
