= Thomas James Churchill =

13th governor of Arkansas

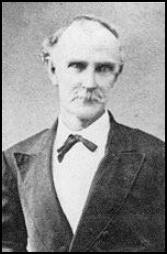

13th Governor of Arkansas
- In office January 13, 1881 – January 13, 1883
- Preceded by: William R. Miller
- Succeeded by: James H. Berry

16th Treasurer of Arkansas
- In office November 12, 1874 – January 12, 1881
- Governor: Augustus H. Garland; William R. Miller
- Preceded by: Robert C. Newton
- Succeeded by: William E. Woodruff, Jr.

14th Postmaster of Little Rock, Arkansas
- In office September 11, 1857 – March 26, 1861
- Nominated by: James Buchanan
- Preceded by: John E. Reardon
- Succeeded by: William F. Pope

Personal details
- Born: March 10, 1824 Louisville, Kentucky, U.S.
- Died: May 14, 1905 (aged 81) Little Rock, Arkansas, U.S.
- Resting place: Mount Holly Cemetery, Little Rock, Arkansas, U.S. 34°44′15.3″N 92°16′42.5″W
- Party: Democratic
- Spouse: Anna M. Sevier (m. 1849)
- Relations: Ambrose H. Sevier (father-in-law)
- Children: 5
- Education: St. Mary's College; Transylvania University

Military service
- Allegiance: United States; Confederate States
- Military service: United States Volunteers; Confederate States Army
- Years of service: 1846–1847 (U.S.); 1861–1865 (C.S.)
- Rank: First Lieutenant (U.S.); Major-General (C.S.)
- Unit: Company E, 1st Kentucky Cavalry Regiment (1846–47)
- Commands: 1st Arkansas Mounted Rifles (1861–62); Churchill's Brigade (1862–63); Churchill's Division (1863–65)
- Battles: Mexican–American War; Battle of Buena Vista (POW); American Civil War; Battle of Wilson's Creek; Battle of Pea Ridge; Battle of Richmond; Battle of Arkansas Post (surrendered) (POW); Battle of Mansfield; Battle of Pleasant Hill; Battle of Jenkins' Ferry

Thomas James Churchill (March 10, 1824 – May 14, 1905) was an American soldier and politician who served as the 13th governor of Arkansas from 1881 to 1883. Before that, he was a senior officer of the Confederate States Army who commanded infantry in the Western and Trans-Mississippi theaters of the American Civil War.

Elected as part of the Redeemers coalition that restored former Confederates to office after Radical Republicans were overthrown across the South, Churchill's gubernatorial tenure was largely derailed by a financial scandal stemming from his tenure as treasurer.

== Early life and education ==
Thomas James Churchill was born near Louisville, Kentucky. (Note: His older sister was Abigail Prather Churchill (1817–1852), wife of Meriwether Lewis Clark Sr. (1809–1881).) He graduated from St. Mary's College in Bardstown in 1844, then studied law at Transylvania University in Lexington. He served during the Mexican–American War, rising to the rank of first lieutenant in the 1st Kentucky Cavalry Regiment. The Mexican Army captured Churchill, who remained a prisoner of war until near the war's end. In 1848, Churchill moved to Little Rock, Arkansas, married the daughter of United States Senator Ambrose H. Sevier, and became a planter. Appointed by President James Buchanan, he was a postmaster from September 1857 to March 1861.

His nephew would use part of the family estate at Spring Grove, Kentucky, to construct Churchill Downs.

== American Civil War ==
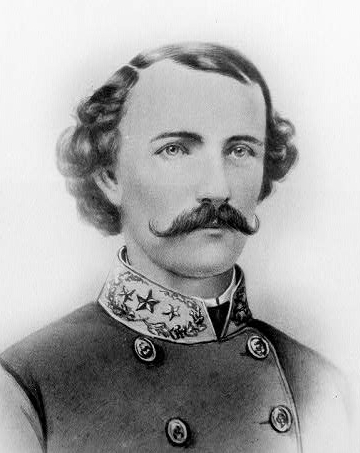
Churchill in uniform, c. 1862

At the start of the American Civil War, Churchill joined the Confederate States Army cavalry as a colonel of the 1st Arkansas Mounted Rifles. His first combat took place at the Battle of Wilson's Creek near Springfield, Missouri. On March 4, 1862, he was promoted to brigadier-general and fought at the Siege of Corinth and soon thereafter took part in the Confederate Heartland Offensive. Churchill played an important role in the Battle of Richmond, commanding a division of men from Texas and Arkansas. Leading his division along a ravine that became known as "Churchill's Draw", he delivered a successful and surprising flanking attack. On February 17, 1864, Churchill was cited as one of three officers to receive special recognition in a Thanks of Confederate States Congress resolution for his actions at Richmond.

During the latter part of 1862, Churchill was transferred back to Arkansas and placed in charge of the fortifications at Arkansas Post. In January 1863, the Post was attacked and seized in the Battle of Arkansas Post by an overwhelming United States Army force under U.S. Maj. Gen. John Alexander McClernand. He was imprisoned at Camp Chase, and upon his release sent a strongly-worded letter to the prison commander about his treatment. "Upon leaving there I was subject to the grossest and most inhuman treatment; my person insulted, the clothing torn from my back, my luggage robbed of all it contained, my overcoat and gloves taken, and some of the officers of my staff had the shirts stripped from their persons...."

After his exchange in May, Churchill was ordered to Chattanooga and served for a brief time in the Army of Tennessee. On August 25, he was again sent to Arkansas, where he continued his service in the Trans-Mississippi Department, commanding a division during the Red River Campaign. He played a significant role in the Battle of Jenkins' Ferry and was promoted to major-general on March 17, 1865.

== Later life ==
Churchill was elected Treasurer of Arkansas in 1873. He was subsequently re-elected in 1875, 1877, and 1879. During the Brooks–Baxter War of 1874, Churchill supported Elisha Baxter and helped enroll volunteers in Baxter's militia. Elected governor of Arkansas in 1880, Churchill served until 1883. While governor, he was plagued by allegations of discrepancies in the treasurer's account from when he served as state treasurer. A special committee found a shortage of $294,876 ($9,838,000 in today's dollars) in state funds during Churchill's tenure as treasurer.

A lawsuit was brought against him, and he was ordered to repay the missing funds. The scandal drew widespread opprobrium, even from the partisan press, and tarnished the image of the Redeemers in Arkansas, who ostensibly were elected to clean up the scandal-ridden Radical Republican state government that had been installed during Reconstruction.

Churchill died in Little Rock and was buried in historic Mount Holly Cemetery with military honors.

== See also ==
- List of Confederate States Army generals
- List of governors of Arkansas
- The Family (Arkansas politics)

== Notes ==
Military offices
New regiment	Commanding officer of the 1st Arkansas Mounted Rifles; 1861–1862	Succeeded by Colonel Robert W. Harper
Party political offices
Preceded by William R. Miller	Democratic nominee for Governor of Arkansas; 1880	Succeeded by James H. Berry
Political offices
Preceded by John E. Reardon	Postmaster of Little Rock, Arkansas; 1857–1861	Succeeded by William F. Pope
Preceded by Robert C. Newton	Treasurer of Arkansas; 1874–1881	Succeeded by William E. Woodruff, Jr.
Preceded by William R. Miller	Governor of Arkansas; 1881–1883	Succeeded by James H. Berry
