= Daniel H. Reynolds =

Confederate States Army brigadier general

Daniel Harris Reynolds
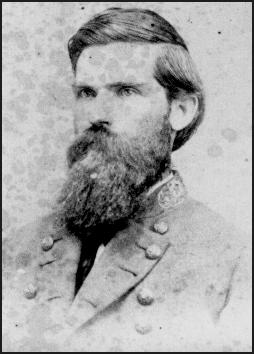
- Born: December 14, 1832; Centerburg, Ohio
- Died: March 14, 1902 (aged 69); Lake Village, Arkansas
- Burial place: Lake Village Cemetery; Lake Village, Arkansas
- Military career
- Allegiance: Confederate States of America
- Branch: Confederate States Army
- Service years: 1861–1865
- Rank: Brigadier General
- Commands: 1st Arkansas Mounted Rifles; Reynolds' Brigade
- Conflicts: American Civil War
- Other work: Lawyer, politician

Daniel Harris Reynolds (December 14, 1832 – March 14, 1902) was a Confederate States Army brigadier general during the American Civil War. He was born at Centerburg, Ohio, but moved to Iowa, Tennessee, and finally to Arkansas before the Civil War. He was a lawyer in Arkansas before the war. After the war, Reynolds resumed his practice of law and was a member of the Arkansas Senate for one term.

== Early life ==
Daniel Harris Reynolds was born on December 14, 1832, in Centerburg, Ohio. The fourth of ten children, Reynolds' parents, Amos Reynolds and Sophia Houck, were farmers. At age 18, with both of his parents deceased, Reynolds attended Ohio Wesleyan University in Delaware, Ohio. Future Confederate Brigadier General Otho F. Strahl was a classmate. Reynolds studied law privately at Somerville, Tennessee. He was admitted to the bar in 1858. In that same year, he moved to Lake Village, Arkansas. Lake Village had recently become county seat of Chicot County, Arkansas, which had a strong slave-based economy of plantation agriculture and king cotton. Reynolds' law practice began to prosper, and he began purchasing real estate in Chicot County. Having become a prominent landowner, Reynolds was a candidate to become the Chicot County delegate to the Arkansas Secession Convention. Though not elected, Reynolds remained a vocal supporter of secession, though he did not own any slaves. Reynolds successfully raised a group of cavalry known as the Chicot Rangers to support the secessionist cause.

== American Civil War ==
Daniel H. Reynolds became a captain of cavalry in the Arkansas militia on May 25, 1861. This unit became Company "A" of the 1st Arkansas Mounted Rifles in the Confederate States Army and Reynolds became its captain on June 14, 1861. He served with this unit at the Battle of Wilson's Creek under then Colonel Thomas J. Churchill. After engaging in some skirmishes in Missouri and Arkansas, and the Battle of Pea Ridge the regiment transferred to service under Major General Earl Van Dorn, operating east of the Mississippi River.

The regiment then fought, on foot, under Lieutenant General E. Kirby Smith, and later under General Braxton Bragg, in Kentucky and east Tennessee in 1862 and in the Tullahoma Campaign. Reynolds became the regiment's major on April 14, 1862, its lieutenant colonel on May 1, 1862, and its colonel on September 20, 1863, after the Battle of Chickamauga. Reynolds won many commendations for his service, including praise from Brigadier General Bushrod Johnson for his efforts at Chickamauga.

Reynolds was appointed a brigadier general on March 5, 1864. In April and May, he held brigade commands in the Confederate Departments of the Gulf and of Alabama and East Mississippi. as part of the garrison at Mobile, Alabama. His brigade then became part of Brigadier General James Cantey's division in the Army of Tennessee in May 1864. They fought in the Atlanta campaign, Franklin-Nashville Campaign and Carolinas campaign.

Reynolds was slightly wounded at the Battle of Franklin, Tennessee on November 30, 1864, where six Confederate generals were killed and six others were wounded. He did not officially report the wound. He took part in the Battle of Nashville with his brigade, which helped cover the Confederate retreat from that battle.

He returned to command a brigade in General George D. Johnston's division in February 1865. Reynolds was struck by a cannonball and lost his left leg at the Battle of Bentonville, North Carolina on March 19, 1865.

== Reconstruction and Return to Chicot County ==
Reynolds was paroled at Charlottesville, Virginia, on May 29, 1865. By June 1865, Reynolds had returned to Chicot County. With his leg amputated above the knee, he ordered a wooden prosthetic leg he would use the rest of his life. Appeals to President Andrew Johnson in August 1865 and May 1866 for amnesty benefits were not responded to. He received a full Presidential pardon on November 13, 1866.

Seeking a seat in the Arkansas Senate, Reynolds won election to represent Ashley County, Chicot County, and Drew County. Though he was seated in the 16th Arkansas General Assembly to run from 1866 to 1867., Radical Reconstruction authorities disbanded the mostly former Confederate group after only a few months. Reynolds resumed practicing law and investing in real estate, at one point owning over 60,000 acres (24,000 ha) in Chicot County.

Reynolds married Martha "Mattie" Jean Wallace on November 24, 1868. The couple had five children. Reynolds also fathered an illegitimate child with Anne "Annie" Franklin, a neighbor and wife of one of Reynolds' business associates. Franklin left Chicot County to have the child in her childhood hometown of Liverpool, England. Franklin named the son Richard "Dickie" Williams Reynolds, and listed herself as "Mrs. Reynolds, widow" on subsequent censuses, though the two never married. Daniel Harris Reynolds died at Lake Village, Arkansas on March 14, 1902, and is buried at Lake Village Cemetery.

== See also ==
- List of American Civil War Generals (Confederate)
