= Confederate Roll of Honor =

Award of the Confederate States Army

- Type: Roll of honor
- Awarded for: "Courage and good conduct on the field of battle"
- Country: Confederate States
- Presented by: the President
- Eligibility: Army personnel only
- Campaign(s): American Civil War
- Established: October 3, 1863

The Confederate Roll of Honor, officially the Roll of Honor, was an award of the Confederate States Army created by Adjutant and Inspector General Samuel Cooper on October 3, 1863 (authorized by an act of the Confederate States Congress on October 13, 1862), to recognize "courage and good conduct on the field of battle."

== History ==
The Congress had passed an act on October 13, 1862, which authorized the President to "bestow medals, with proper devices, upon such officers of the armies of the Confederate States as shall be conspicuous for courage and good conduct on the field of battle, and also to confer a badge of distinction upon one private or non-commissioned officer of each company after every signal victory it shall have assisted to achieve." No award for the Confederate navy was authorized. General Lee is said to have opposed the awarding of medals and badges in wartime for fear that they would be distributed inequitably.

Delays in obtaining medals led the Army to creating the roll. Nominations were made by company members after enemy engagements. The soldiers voted after each battle, and the results were listed in battle reports, read aloud to regiments, and published in newspapers across the Confederacy. Bestowing an honor by the vote of common soldiers was virtually unprecedented.

== The Roll ==
General orders Number 131, issued by Adjutant and Inspector General S. Cooper, included the names of hundreds of officers and men who fought in the battles of Murfreesboro, Chancellorsville and Gettysburg. Subsequently new additions to the Roll of Honor were published for engagements after the Gettysburg Campaign, including:

- General Order No. 64, 10 August 1864, for the battles of:

Battle of Brandy Station, Va.

Battle of Chickamauga, Ga;

Battle of Jenkins Ferry, Ark;

Battle of Kennesaw Mountain, Ga.

Battle of Locust Hill, Va; and Battle of Payne's Farm, Va;

Battle of Pleasant Hill, La;

- General Order No. 87, 10 December 1864 for the battles of:

Battle of Bristoe Station .

various engagements of the Jeff. Davis Legion;

miscellaneous engagements of the First Battalion, Confederate Infantry.

Battles Near Petersburg;

Battle of Weldon Rail Road;

Battle of Ream's Station, Weldon Rail Road;

Battle of Fort Harrison;

Battle of Darbytown Road;

Battle of Hanover Junction;

Battle of Drewry's Bluff;
