= Battle of Spring Hill =

1864 battle of the American Civil War

Coordinates: 35.7374°N 86.9323°W

- Part of the American Civil War
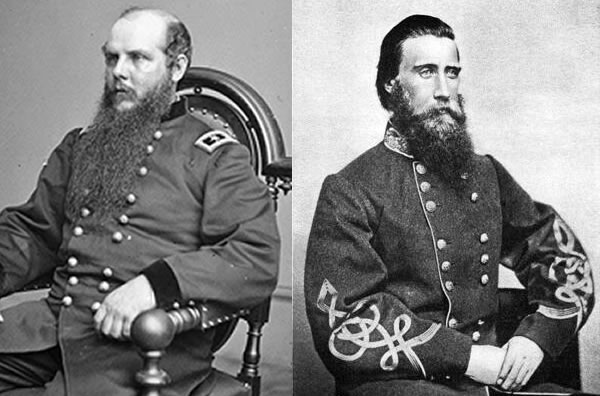
- Army commanders Schofield and Hood
Date	November 29, 1864
Location	Maury County, Tennessee
Result	Union victory

Belligerents
United States of America	Confederate States of America

Commanders and leaders
John M. Schofield	John Bell Hood

Units involved
IV Corps; XXIII Corps	Army of Tennessee

Strength
7,000	12,000

Casualties and losses
350	500

The Battle of Spring Hill was fought November 29, 1864, at Spring Hill, Tennessee, as part of the Franklin-Nashville Campaign of the American Civil War. The Confederate Army of Tennessee, commanded by Lt. Gen. John Bell Hood, attacked a Union force under Maj. Gen. John M. Schofield as it retreated from Columbia through Spring Hill. Because of a series of command failures and solid U.S. Army leadership, the Confederates were unable to inflict serious damage on the Federals and could not prevent their safe passage north to Franklin during the night. The next day, Hood pursued Schofield and attacked his fortifications in the Battle of Franklin, resulting in severe Confederate casualties.

== Background ==
Following his defeat in the Atlanta campaign, Hood had hoped to lure Maj. Gen. William T. Sherman into battle by disrupting his supply lines from Chattanooga to Atlanta. After a brief period in which he pursued Hood, Sherman elected instead to conduct his March to the Sea from Atlanta to Savannah, Georgia. He left forces under the command of Maj. Gen. George H. Thomas, the commander of the Army of the Cumberland, to defend Tennessee and defeat Hood: principally the IV Corps from the Army of the Cumberland, commanded by Maj. Gen. David S. Stanley, and the XXIII Corps from the Army of the Ohio, commanded by Maj. Gen. John Schofield.

Hood moved through northern Alabama and concentrated his army at Florence from October 30 to November 21, waiting for supplies and to link up with his newly assigned cavalry commander, Maj. Gen. Nathan Bedford Forrest. Rather than attempting to pursue Sherman through Georgia, Hood decided to execute a new plan: move north into Tennessee, defeat Thomas's army before it could concentrate, seize the important manufacturing center of Nashville, and continue north into Kentucky, possibly as far as the Ohio River. From this point, he could travel east to Virginia to join up with Gen. Robert E. Lee at Petersburg. His theater commander, Gen. P.G.T. Beauregard, urged Hood to take immediate action in an attempt to distract Sherman's advance, emphasizing the importance of moving before Thomas could consolidate his forces.

The Army of Tennessee marched north from Florence on November 21 in three columns: Maj. Gen. Benjamin F. Cheatham's corps on the left, Lt. Gen. Stephen D. Lee's in the center, and Lt. Gen. Alexander P. Stewart's on the right, all screened aggressively by Forrest's cavalry. Schofield, who commanded Stanley's corps as well as his own, retreated in the face of this advance, marching rapidly north from Pulaski to Columbia. The Federals were able to reach Columbia and erect fortifications just hours before the Confederates arrived.

On November 24–29, the "Battle of Columbia" was a series of skirmishes and artillery bombardments against Columbia. On November 28, Thomas directed Schofield to begin preparations for a withdrawal north to Franklin. He was expecting (incorrectly) that Maj. Gen. Andrew J. Smith's XVI Corps arrival from Missouri was imminent and he wanted the combined force to defend against Hood on the line of the Harpeth River at Franklin instead of the Duck River at Columbia. Schofield sent his 800-wagon supply train out in front, guarded by part of the IV Corps division of Brig. Gen. George D. Wagner. On the same day, Hood sent the three cavalry divisions under Nathan Bedford Forrest miles east of Columbia, where they crossed the river and headed north.

On November 29 Hood sent Cheatham's and Stewart's corps on a flanking march north, crossing the Duck River at Davis's Ford east of Columbia while two divisions of Lee's corps and most of the army's artillery remained on the southern bank to deceive Schofield into thinking a general assault was planned against Columbia. Hood, riding near the head of the column with Cheatham's corps, planned to interpose his army between Schofield and Thomas, hoping to defeat Schofield as the Federals retreated north from Columbia. Stewart's corps followed Cheatham, and they were followed by the division of Maj. Gen. Edward "Allegheny" Johnson (Lee's corps). The rest of Lee's corps remained south of Columbia, demonstrating with artillery fire against Schofield's men north of the Duck.

Cavalry skirmishing between Brig. Gen. James H. Wilson's Union cavalry and Forrest's Confederate troopers continued throughout the day as the Confederates advanced. Forrest's wide turning movement with 4,000 troopers had forced Wilson north to Hurt's Corner, preventing the Union horsemen from interfering with Hood's infantry advance. By 10 a.m. on November 29, Forrest ordered his men to turn west toward Spring Hill. Wilson sent multiple messages to Schofield warning of Hood's advance, but it was not until dawn on November 29 that Schofield believed the reports, understood the deception represented by Lee's artillery bombardment, and realized the predicament he was in. He sent Stanley north with the IV Corps division of Brig. Gen. Nathan Kimball, the remainder of Wagner's division, and the bulk of the Federal reserve artillery. Their mission initially was to protect the trains, but also to hold the crossroads at Spring Hill to allow the entire army to withdraw safely to Franklin.

== Battle ==
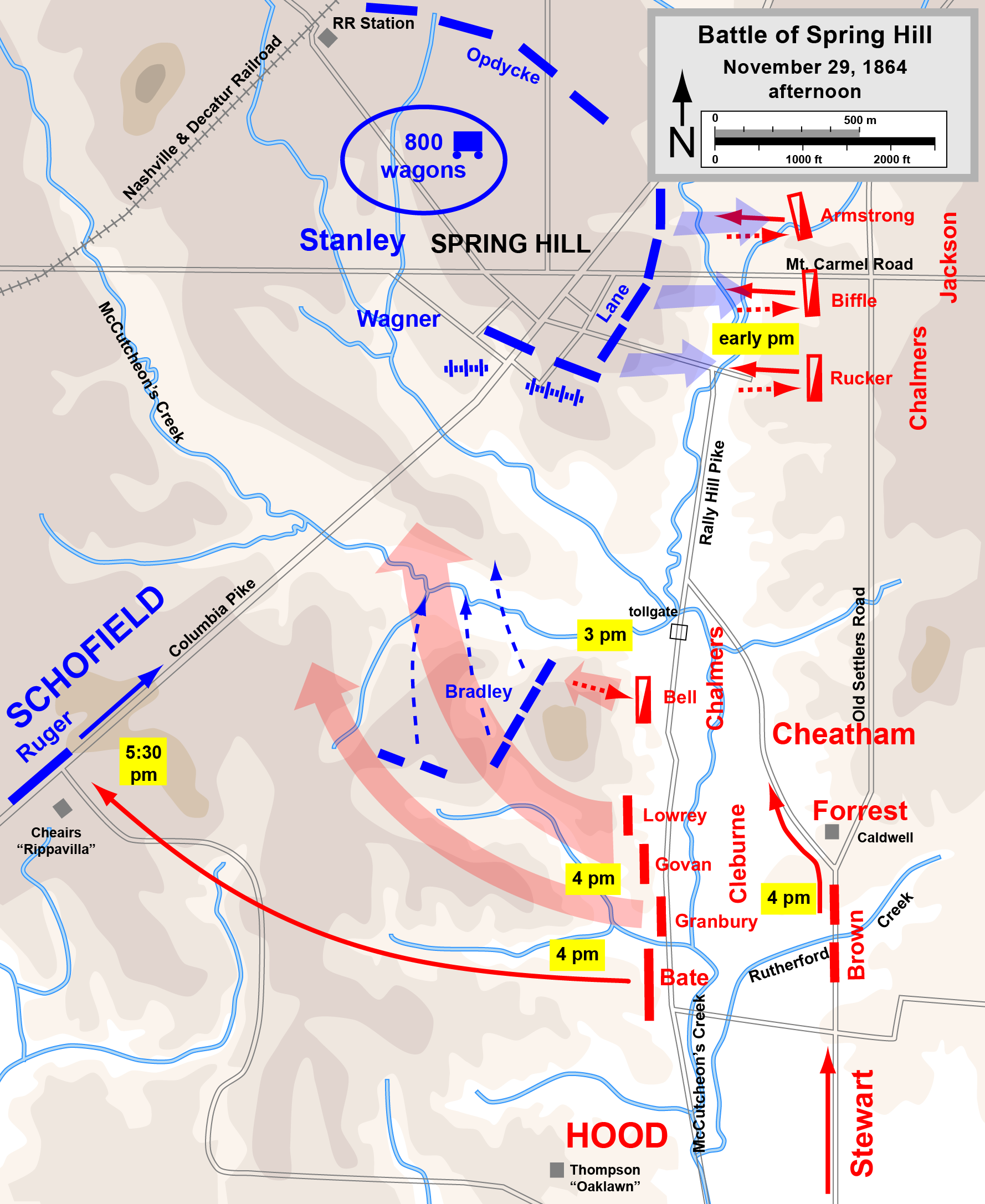
Actions at Spring Hill, afternoon, November 29, 1864 Confederate Union

Forrest's cavalrymen approached Spring Hill on the Mount Carmel Road and at about 11:30 a.m. ran into pickets from the IV Corps. Stanley had moved north rapidly and formed up positions with Wagner's division that protected the village of Spring Hill on three sides. To the northwest of the village, the lines of Col. Emerson Opdycke's brigade protected the enormous supply trains, Brig. Gen. Luther P. Bradley's brigade. Lane's brigade rushed forward and pushed back the dismounted cavalrymen, primarily Brig. Gen. Frank C. Armstrong's Mississippi brigade. Forrest received a message from Hood to hold the position at all hazards until the infantry could arrive. Maj. Gen. Patrick R. Cleburne's division of Cheatham's corps arrived midafternoon on Forrest's left. The cavalrymen, low on ammunition, pulled out of the line and moved north to be ready to cover a further advance of Hood's army, or to block Schofield's withdrawal.

Forrest's men moved south and he directed the brigade of Brig. Gen. Tyree H. Bell of Chalmer's division to drive off what he thought was a small force of cavalry from a knoll south of McCutcheon's Creek. They were actually engaging with Bradley's brigade, which drove them back immediately with heavy artillery support. The chastened Forrest remarked, "They was in there sure enough, wasn't they, Chalmers?"

The first command miscommunication of the battle took place upon Hood's arrival as he established his headquarters at the Absalom Thompson house, "Oaklawn". Cheatham had ordered his division under Maj. Gen. William B. Bate to move against Spring Hill in concert with Cleburne, forming up on the Irishman's left. Hood then personally ordered Bate to move towards the Columbia Pike and "sweep toward Columbia." Neither Bate nor Hood bothered to inform Cheatham of this change in orders. Bate's men advanced about 3,000 yards in battle formation before they reached the pike, a journey taking over two hours. At about 5:30 p.m., his lead element, sharpshooters under Maj. Thomas D. Caswell, fired on a Federal column approaching from their left—Maj. Gen. Thomas H. Ruger's division of the XXIII Corps, the vanguard of Schofield's main body. But before the two divisions could engage in battle, an officer from Cheatham's staff arrived to insist that Bate follow Cheatham's original orders and join Cleburne's attack. Late that night, Bate reported the contact with the Federal column, but Cheatham discounted the importance of the encounter.

Back in Columbia, Schofield became convinced at about 3 p.m. that the Confederates would not attack him there and at 3:30 he joined two brigades from Ruger's division on the march to Spring Hill. He ordered his remaining force to remain until dark and then join him on the march north. As soon as Schofield departed, Stephen D. Lee coincidentally began an attack against the Union position, although he had considerable difficulty deploying pontoon bridges for the river crossing. By the time the bulk of his two divisions were able to cross, the senior Union commander left behind at Columbia, Brig. Gen. Jacob D. Cox, began his withdrawal and the final troops departed up the Franklin Pike by 10 p.m.

Cleburne's 3,000 men began an en echelon attack against Bradley's brigade at about 4 p.m. From right to left, his brigades were led by Brig. Gens. Mark P. Lowrey, Daniel C. Govan, and Hiram B. Granbury. Bell's cavalry brigade supported on the right, although they remained low on ammunition and had little effect in the fight. Whereas Cheatham was expecting Cleburne to drive north into Spring Hill, Hood's intention was to use this formation to sweep toward the turnpike and wheel left to intercept Schofield's arriving units, but he apparently had not observed the location of the Union positions south of the town. The stairstep echelon formation was therefore less effective against Bradley's fortified position on their right and front, allowing only Lowrey's brigade to engage them initially. After Lowrey requested assistance, Cleburne personally led Govan's Arkansas brigade forward, wheeling them into a northern alignment against Bradley's right flank. The attack by Govan and Lowrey outflanked Bradley and his men fled in disorder. Cleburne's two brigades chased them vigorously, and they were stopped short of the turnpike only by heavy fire from the IV Corps artillery, placed earlier by Stanley on a knoll north of the creek.

By this time, Cheatham's division under Maj. Gen. John C. Brown (Cheatham's own division before he assumed corps command) had crossed Rutherford Creek and was moved into position by Cheatham for another attack on Spring Hill, on Cleburne's right. In the gathering darkness, the sounds of Brown's guns would be the signal for Cleburne's men to resume their attack. Brown did not attack, however. His brigade commander on the right, Brig. Gen. Otho F. Strahl, reported that there were Union troops in position on his right flank and front and that Forrest's cavalrymen, promised to protect his right flank, did not seem to be present. Since his brigade under Brig. Gen. States Rights Gist had not yet arrived to join the attack, Brown decided to consult with his corps commander before proceeding.

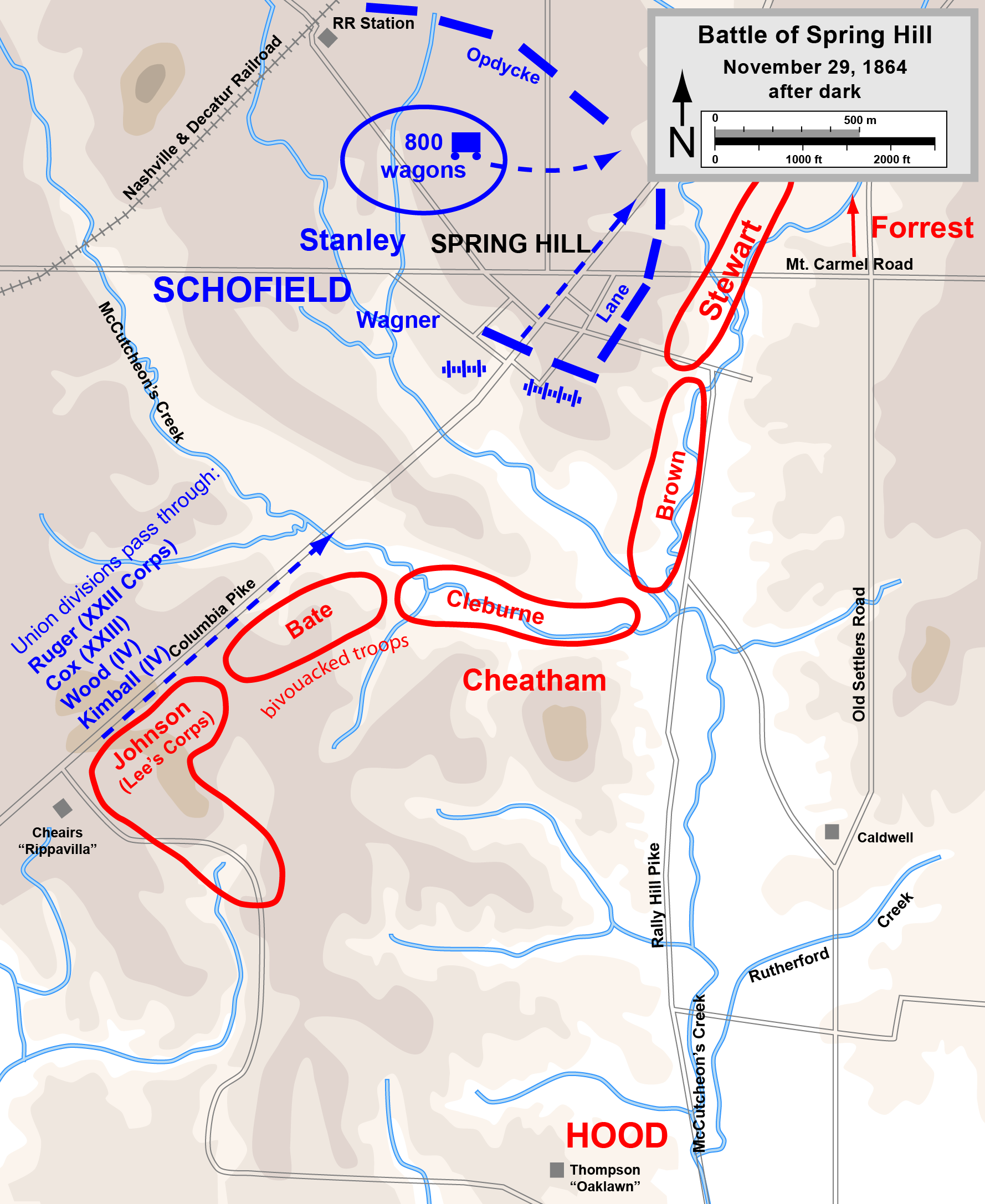
Positions at Spring Hill after dark

Cheatham was at that time attempting to find Bate and steer him into the combined attack. Brown sent two staff officers to find Cheatham and halted his troops while he awaited a decision. By the time Cheatham and Brown were able to speak, at around 6:15 p.m., the battlefield was in total darkness, and the two officers decided that an assault conducted then without knowing the condition of their right flank might be a disaster. Cheatham rode off to Hood's headquarters to consult with the army commander. Hood was furious that the attack had not proceeded as he intended and that the pike was still open. Cheatham said that he needed assistance from Stewart to protect his right flank, so Hood dispatched a staff officer to find Stewart. Having been up since 3 a.m., Hood was by this time very fatigued. He indulged in a large dinner at Oaklawn, which included considerable "toasting" of drinks, and went to bed at 9 p.m., confident that whatever setbacks his army had suffered during the day, they would be able to correct them in the morning and bag Schofield.

Earlier in the afternoon, Hood had brought up Stewart's corps across Rutherford Creek and directed him to move north of Spring Hill and cut off the Federal column. After taking a wrong turn, Stewart ended up at Forrest's headquarters at the Caldwell house. There he conferred with Forrest about the positions of the army, when suddenly one of Cheatham's staff officers arrived and directed in Hood's name that Stewart's corps move to support Brown's attack. After Stewart's column retraced its route, he arrived at Brown's command post, but was confused about the apparent disagreement in orders he was receiving, so he traveled back to Hood's headquarters for clarification. He informed Hood that because his men were tired and had been on the move since daylight—it was now 11 p.m.—he had ordered them to bivouac while they waited. Hood accepted the situation and told Stewart to head in the direction of Franklin in the morning after the men had rested.

== Aftermath ==
The Battle of Spring Hill was a minor affair in terms of casualties—about 350 Union and 500 Confederate—but the result of miscommunication and simply bad military management was that during the night all of Schofield's command, including Cox, passed from Columbia through Spring Hill while the Confederate commanders slept. The passage of the army did not go unnoticed by some of the soldiers, but no concerted effort was made to block the pike. Brig. Gen. Lawrence S. Ross's cavalry brigade attempted to block the passage of the supply trains north of Spring Hill, at Thompson's Station, but accompanying Federal infantry drove them off. A private soldier woke up the commanding general at 2 a.m. and reported he saw the Union column moving north, but Hood did nothing beyond sending a dispatch to Cheatham to fire on passing traffic.

By 6:00 a.m. on November 30, all of Schofield's army was well north of Spring Hill and its vanguard had reached Franklin, where it began to build breastworks south of town. In the morning Hood discovered Schofield's escape, and after an angry conference with his subordinate commanders in which he blamed all but himself for the failure, ordered his army to resume its pursuit, setting up the disastrous Battle of Franklin that afternoon.

The Spring Hill incident was an object lesson in the breakdown of command responsibility and communication. Hood was partially responsible. He had come to Spring Hill with no plan save to outrace Schofield to Nashville. His absence from the field made him ignorant of several crucial matters. When he finally had learned by midnight that the Rebel line was not facing the pike, he still shunned personal observation, being too confident of Schofield's position.

— Thomas L. Connelly, Autumn of Glory

Spring Hill had been, arguably, Hood's best chance to isolate and defeat the Union army (Thomas L. Connelly, historian of the Army of Tennessee, argues that the importance of Spring Hill has been overblown and that Schofield had three alternative routes to either Franklin or Nashville.) Recriminations for the lost opportunity soon began flying. Rumors circulated about Brown being drunk, but they were never substantiated and he was later elected governor of Tennessee. Hood believed that Cheatham was most responsible, although he also had criticism for two of Cheatham's division commanders, Cleburne and Brown. His official report said, "Major-General Cheatham was ordered to attack the enemy at once vigorously and get possession of the pike, and, although these orders were frequently and earnestly repeated, he made but a feeble and partial attack, failing to reach the point indicated." Historians Thomas L. Connelly, Eric Jacobson, and Wiley Sword have each assigned blame to both Hood and Cheatham.

A variety of theories about Hood's personal failures have occupied historians for years. One of the more persistent is that the general was debilitated from ingesting laudanum in the evening, attempting to relieve the pain and irritation to his amputated leg by the long, damp ride over rough roads that day. Eric Jacobson's book, For Cause & for Country, lists many authors who have supported this story, but he states that "there is no evidence that Hood took any sort of drugs, or even alcohol, at Spring Hill."

== Battlefield Preservation ==
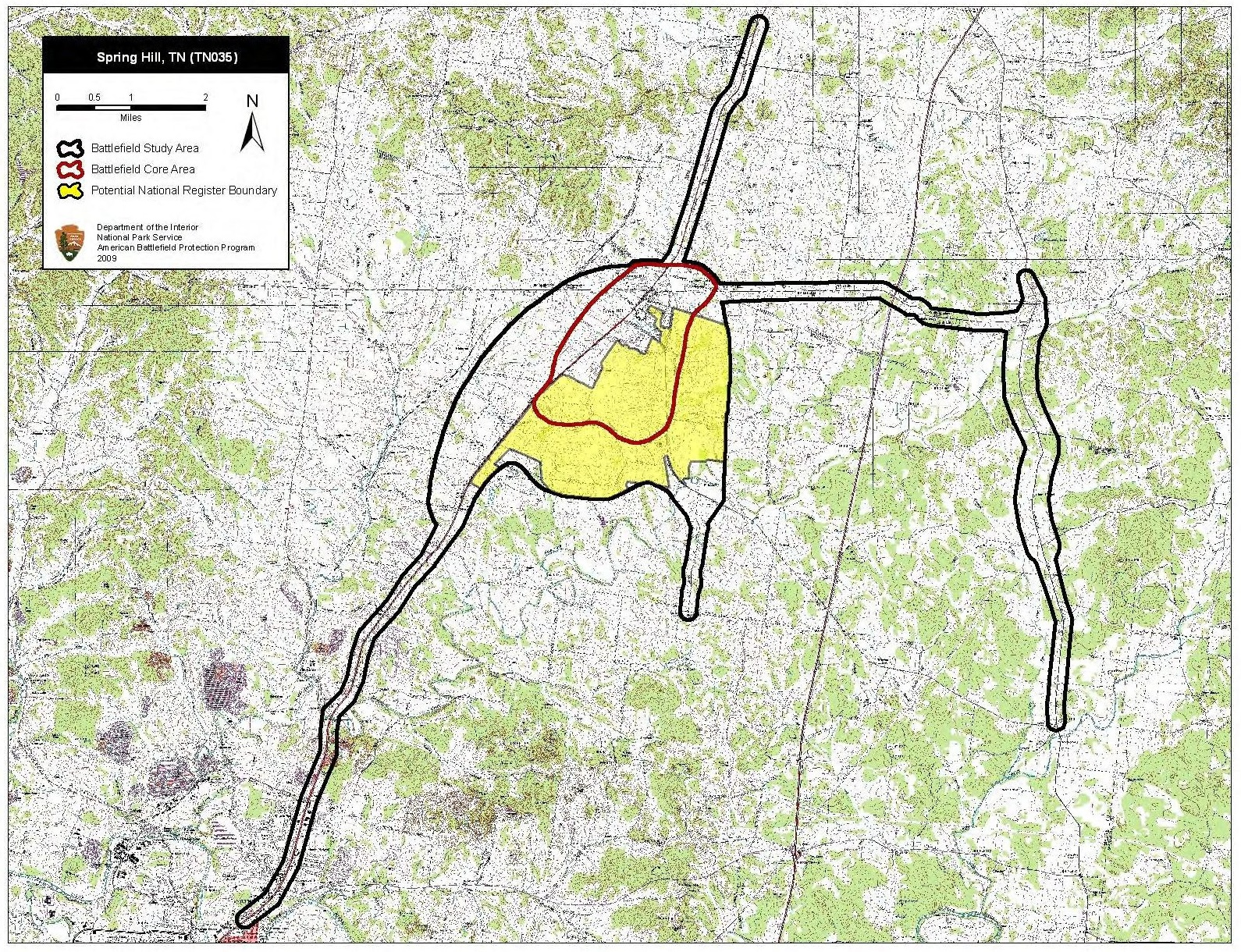
Map of Spring Hill Battlefield core and study areas by the American Battlefield Protection Program.

Portions of landscape have been altered, but most essential features remain. Industrial and residential development and associated road and communication infrastructure are rapidly overtaking the historic battlefield. Protected lands include Rippavilla, Inc. (98.44 acres), Civil War Preservation Trust (70.00 acres), Tennessee Land Trust (82.70 acres), and Maury County Parks and Recreation Department (20.00 acres). The Civil War Preservation Trust was renamed Civil War Trust in 2011 and in May 2018 became a division of American Battlefield Trust. The Trust and its partners have acquired and preserved a total of 195 acres (0.79 km^{2}) of the battlefield in three transactions since 1996.
