= Chickamauga campaign =

1863 campaign of the American Civil War

Initial movements in the Chickamauga campaign, August 15 – September 8, 1863 Confederate Union

The Chickamauga campaign of the American Civil War was a series of battles fought in northwestern Georgia from August 21 to September 20, 1863, between the Union Army of the Cumberland and Confederate Army of Tennessee. The campaign started successfully for Union commander William S. Rosecrans, with the Union army occupying the vital city of Chattanooga and forcing the Confederates to retreat into northern Georgia. But a Confederate attack at the Battle of Chickamauga forced Rosecrans to retreat back into Chattanooga and allowed the Confederates to lay siege to the Union forces.

== Background ==
In his successful Tullahoma campaign in the summer of 1863, William S. Rosecrans moved southeast from Murfreesboro, Tennessee, outmaneuvering Braxton Bragg and forcing him to abandon Middle Tennessee and withdraw to the city of Chattanooga, suffering only 569 Union casualties along the way.

The union general-in-chief Maj. Gen. Henry W. Halleck and President Abraham Lincoln were insistent that Rosecrans move quickly to take Chattanooga. Seizing the city would open the door for the Union to advance toward Atlanta and the heartland of the South. Chattanooga was a vital rail hub with lines going north toward Nashville and Knoxville and south toward Atlanta. Chattanooga was also an important manufacturing center for the production of iron and coke, located on the navigable Tennessee River. Situated between Lookout Mountain, Missionary Ridge, Raccoon Mountain, and Stringer's Ridge, Chattanooga occupied an important, defensible position.

Although Bragg's Army of Tennessee contained about 52,000 men at the end of July, the Confederate government merged the Department of East Tennessee, under Maj. Gen. Simon B. Buckner, into Bragg's Department of Tennessee, which added 17,800 men to Bragg's army, but also extended his command responsibilities northward to the Knoxville area. This brought a third subordinate into Bragg's command who had little or no respect for the commanding general. Lt. Gen. Leonidas Polk and Maj. Gen. William J. Hardee had already made their animosity well known. Buckner's attitude was colored by Bragg's unsuccessful invasion of Buckner's native Kentucky in 1862, as well as by the loss of his command through the merger. A positive aspect for Bragg was Hardee's request to be transferred to Mississippi in July, but he was replaced by Lt. Gen. D.H. Hill, a general who did not get along with Robert E. Lee in Virginia.

The Confederate War Department asked Bragg in early August if he could assume the offensive against Rosecrans if he were given reinforcements from Mississippi. He demurred, concerned about daunting geographical obstacles and logistical challenges, preferring to wait for Rosecrans to solve those same problems and attack him. He was also concerned about a sizable Union force under Maj. Gen. Ambrose E. Burnside that was threatening Knoxville. Bragg withdrew his forces from advanced positions around Bridgeport, which left Rosecrans free to maneuver on the northern side of the Tennessee River. He concentrated his two infantry corps around Chattanooga and relied upon cavalry to cover his flanks, extending from northern Alabama to near Knoxville.

== Opposing forces ==
Opposing commanders
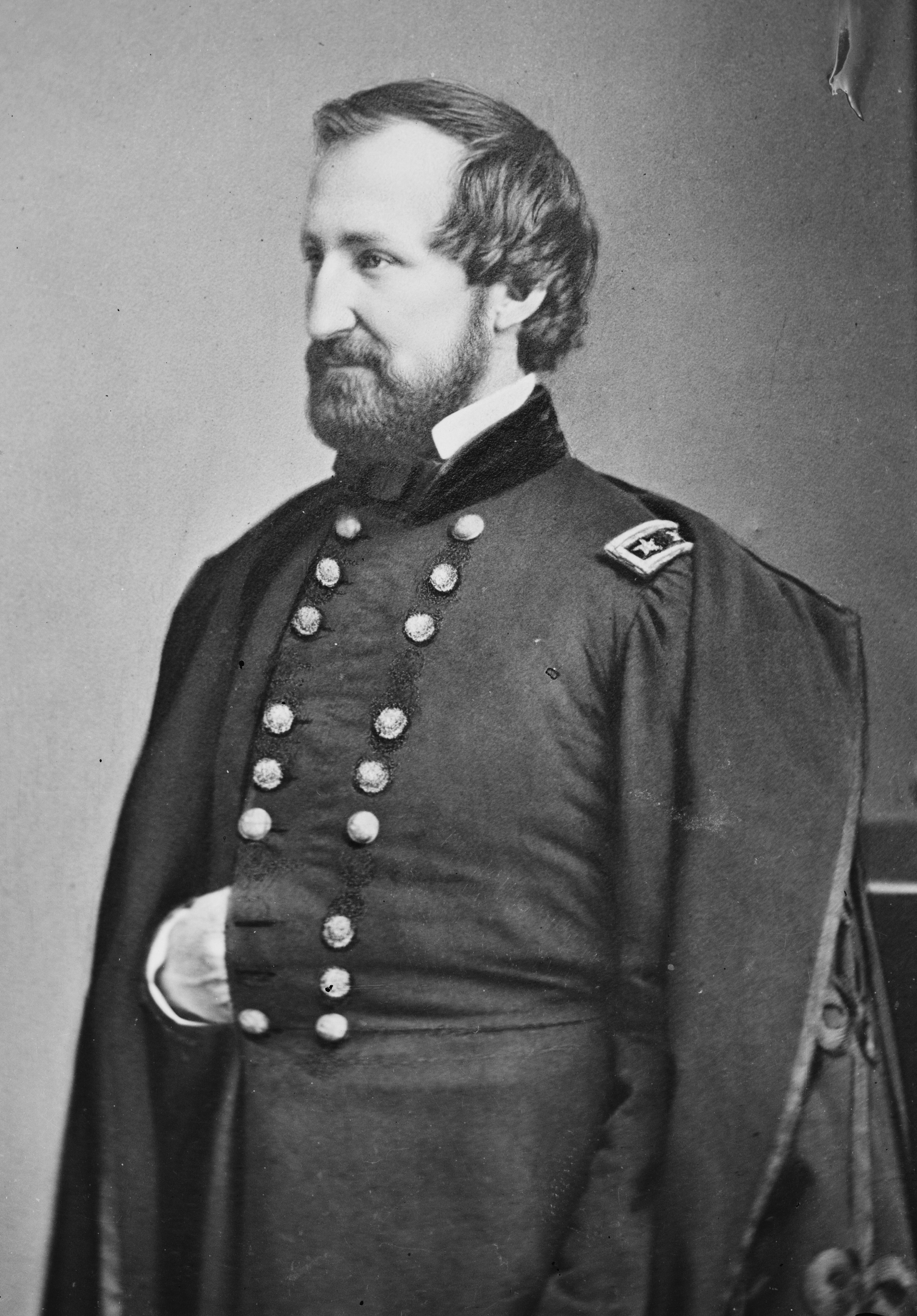
Maj. Gen.
William Rosecrans, USA

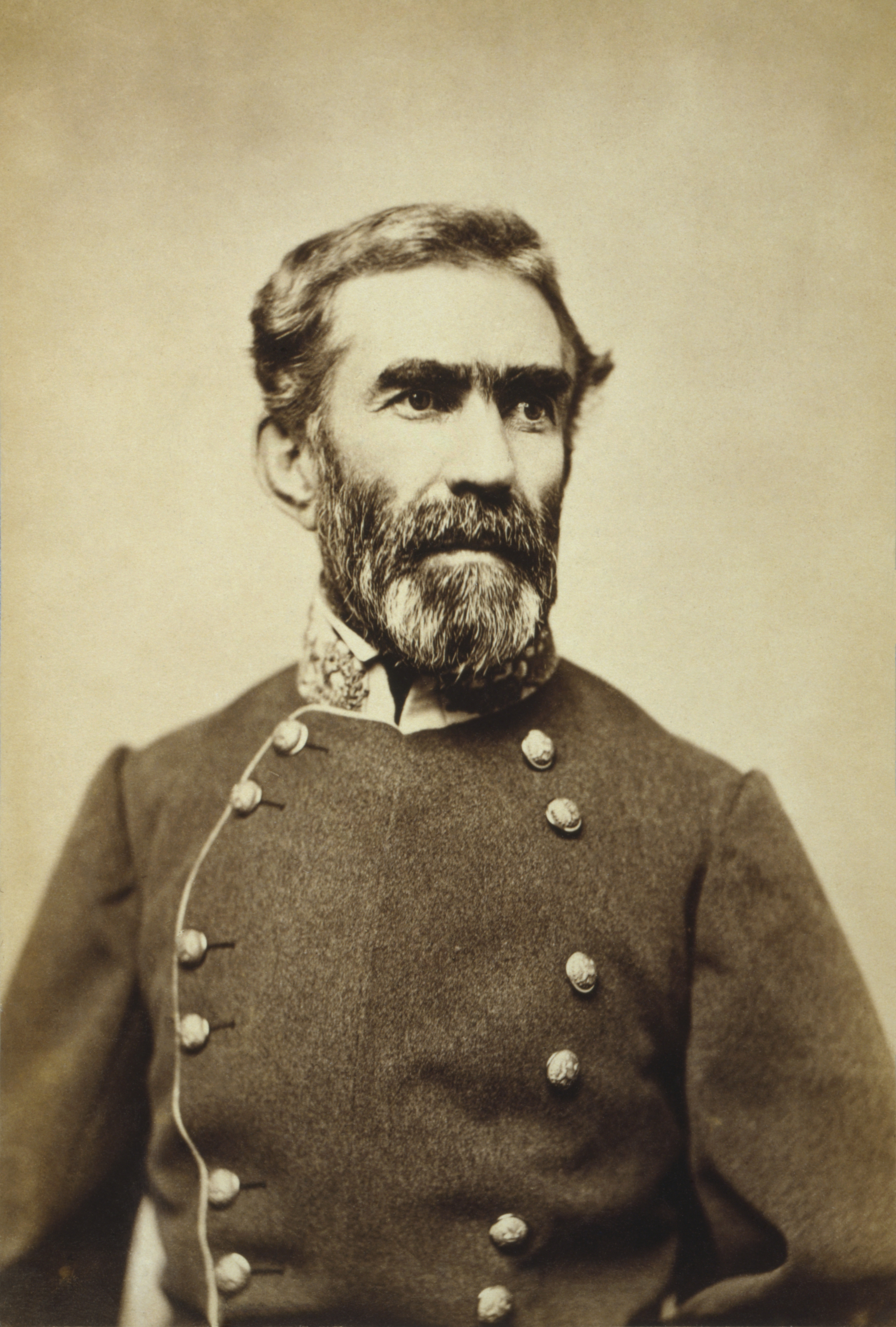
Maj. Gen.
Braxton Bragg, CSA

=== Intelligence operations ===
The intelligence journal of William S. Rosecrans was maintained by Capt. David G. Swaim. It provides a comprehensive overview of the what Rosecrans knew when making decisions. It has been assumed that Braxton Bragg was clueless about federal activity when making decisions. However, the diary of Bragg's assistant adjutant general Lt. Col. George Brent provides a comprehensive account of what Bragg knew at any given time and documents that Bragg did react to available intelligence. Both sides engaged in espionage operations.

=== Available technology ===
New technology was used by both armed forces. At the time, rail transport had been in operation for not even thirty years in North America. Both armies used single track railroads to viably sustain themselves in inhospitable terrain.

Telegraphy was a recent invention at the time, but the Army of the Cumberland was using the singing wire on the battlefield itself. Engineers in the armed forces of William S. Rosecrans built multiple pontoon and trestle bridges across the Tennessee River.

== Battles ==
=== Second Battle of Chattanooga 21 August 1863 ===
Rosecrans ordered a brigade to shell Chattanooga from the western side of the Tennessee River and skirmish with the main Confederate force in the city to divert attention away from the flanking column sent southwest of the city. Other Union units were deployed along the river to the east. The diversion was successful, with Bragg concentrating his army east of Chattanooga. After concluding that his position was untenable, Bragg abandoned the city on September 6 and retreated into northern Georgia.

=== Battle of Davis's Cross Roads 10-11 September 1863 ===
Bragg intended to attack General James S. Negley's isolated division of the Union XIV Corps, commanded by George H. Thomas, before Rosecrans could concentrate the rest of his army at that location. He ordered the divisions of Thomas Hindman and Patrick Cleburne to concentrate together and launch a joint attack under Hindman's command. Due to delays in conveying orders, Cleburne's division failed to arrive in time on the 10th, while Thomas reinforced the isolated division with the rest of his corps. After the two divisions were united the next day, they failed to launch a coordinated attack on Thomas' positions and were repulsed.

=== Battle of Chickamauga 19-20 September 1863 ===
Believing that Thomas L. Crittenden's XXI Corps was isolated from the rest of the Union army, Bragg ordered his army to concentrate near Lee's and Gordon's Mills; however, Rosecrans had been concentrating his army along Chickamauga Creek. Detachments from Thomas' Corps and Confederate cavalry collided on September 19, with both commanders feeding reinforcements into the engagement. The day ended without a clear victory by either side. The next day, Bragg ordered attacks in an echelon formation starting with the left flank at dawn but Polk, commanding the Confederate left wing, failed to properly supervise his command. The attacks began four hours late and failed to dislodge the Union army from its positions. Shortly after 11 a.m., an attack by Longstreet's corps struck a gap in the Union line, routing most of the Union army. Thomas formed his corps on Snodgrass Hill and held off further Confederate attacks for the remainder of the afternoon before retreating back to Chattanooga near sundown.

== Aftermath ==
Rosecrans retreated into Chattanooga after the battle of Chickamauga. Reinforcements were sent from the Army of the Tennessee and the Army of the Potomac. Both Crittenden and Alexander McCook, commander of the XX Corps, were replaced on September 28 for alleged misconduct at Chickamauga, although they were both cleared of the charge. U.S. Grant, recently made commander of the Military Division of the Mississippi and placed in command of the Union forces near Chattanooga, decided to replace Rosecrans with Thomas on October 19.

At the time of Chickamauga, the Army of Tennessee was suffering from a shortage of food and of wagons to transport supplies; it also lacked pontoon bridges to cross the Tennessee River. Bragg consequently decided to lay siege to the Union army. The Confederates occupied Missionary Ridge and spread a picket line along the south bank of the river towards Alabama. Fire from Confederate sharpshooters prevented supply wagons from reaching Chattanooga. The Union response to the siege initiated the Chattanooga campaign which lasted for the remainder of 1863 and ultimately drove Confederate forces from Tennessee.

== See also ==
- Troop engagements of the American Civil War, 1863
- List of costliest American Civil War land battles
- List of American Civil War battles
- Western Theater of the American Civil War
- Tullahoma campaign
- Timeline of events leading to the American Civil War
- Commemoration of the American Civil War on postage stamps
