= CSS Pickens =

Cushing-class schooner revenue cutter

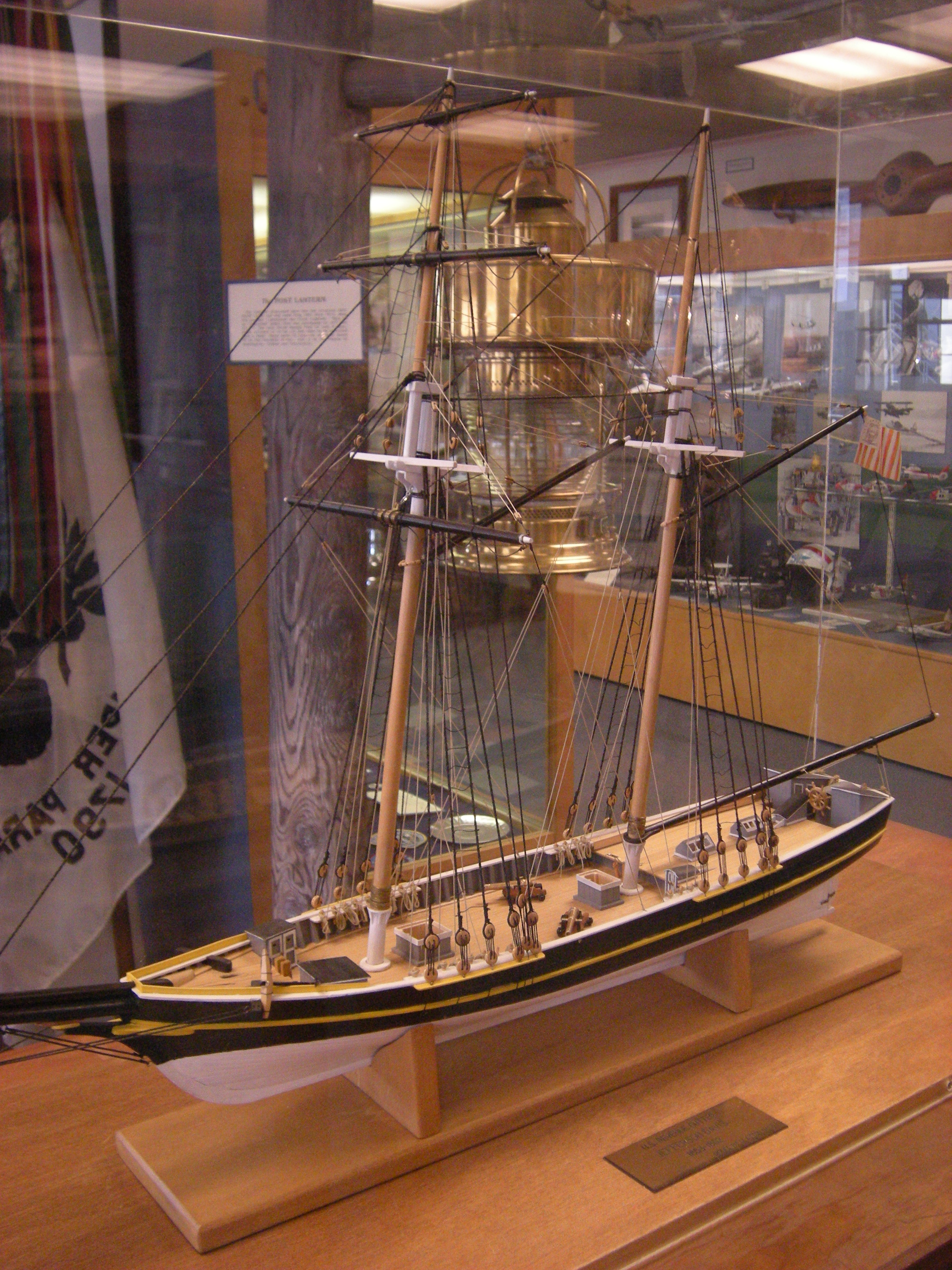
- Model of USRC Jefferson Davis, a sister ship of Pickens from the Cushing-class.

History

United States
- Name: Robert McClelland
- Namesake: Robert McClelland
- Builder: J. M. Hood, Somerset, Massachusetts
- Launched: July 11, 1853
- Christened: April 18, 1853
- Commissioned: 1853
- Fate: Surrendered to Louisiana authorities, January 31, 1861

Confederate States
- Name: Pickens
- In service: February 18, 1861
- Fate: burned to prevent capture, April 25, 1862

General characteristics
- Class & type: Cushing-class schooner
- Displacement: 152 to 174 short tons (136 to 155 long tons)
- Length: 92 ft (28.0 m)
- Beam: 22 ft (6.7 m)
- Draft: 9 ft (2.7 m)
- Propulsion: Sail
- Complement: 13+
- Armament: 1 to 5 cannons

CSS Pickens (originally known as USRC Robert McClelland) was a Cushing-class schooner revenue cutter that saw service in the navies of the United States and Confederate States of America. Built as Robert McClelland in Somerset, Massachusetts, in 1853, she served along the coasts of Louisiana and Texas before transferring her crew and officers to USRC Washington in 1859 and heading to New York for repairs. In 1860, Robert McClelland reported to South West Pass, Mississippi, and was permanently assigned to New Orleans, Louisiana, later that year. After the 1861 secession of Louisiana, her commander turned her over to the state. She entered Confederate service on February 18 and was renamed Pickens. Pickens played a minor role in the Battle of the Head of Passes before being burned to prevent its capture on April 25, 1862, after Union Navy forces entered New Orleans.

== Service history ==
=== United States service ===
Originally a United States revenue cutter, Robert McClelland was a topsail schooner built by J. M. Hood in Somerset, Massachusetts, with Captain N. L. Coste supervising the construction; the fitting-out process was to occur in New York. A Cushing-class schooner, she had a length of 92 feet (28 m), a beam of 22 feet (6.7 m), and a draft of 9 feet (2.7 m). She displaced between 152 short tons (136 long tons) and 174 short tons (155 long tons) and had a crew of at least 13 men. Reports placed her armament at between one and five guns. She did not have engines and was powered by sail. The vessel was christened on April 18, 1853, launched on July 11, and was commissioned at some point during 1853. All of the Cushing-class vessels were named after figures in the Franklin Pierce administration, with Robert McClelland being named after the Secretary of the Interior, Robert McClelland.

She left for Mobile, Alabama, on November 23, and reached there on December 7. As of January 14, 1854, Robert McClelland was reported to have been sent to Bermuda to transport dispatches about the wreck of the steamer San Francisco to vessels located there. San Francisco had sunk with heavy loss of life while transporting passengers, including members of the 3rd Artillery Regiment, from New York City to San Francisco. She then patrolled the coastlines of Texas and Louisiana. On May 29, 1859, an order arrived for the ship to send her crew and officers to the cutter USRC Washington and then go to New York to be repaired; she arrived on July 11. On September 1, 1860, she returned to South West Pass, Mississippi with orders to exchange officers and crew with Washington; Robert McClelland was permanently assigned to New Orleans, Louisiana, on November 8, 1860.

=== Confederate service ===
The state of Louisiana seceded from the Union on January 26, 1861, and Captain J. G. Breshwood, Robert McClelland's commanding officer, refused to take the ship north. United States Secretary of the Treasury John Adams Dix ordered Second Lieutenant Samuel B. Caldwell to take command of the ship and treat Breshwood as a mutineer if necessary. This order was not received, and Breshwood surrendered the ship to Louisiana authorities on January 31. She entered Confederate service on February 18. Breshwood and the ship's two lieutenants, Caldwell and Thomas Fister, entered the Confederate States Revenue Service and were reassigned to Robert McClelland, which was renamed Pickens. She was armed with three cannons during her Confederate service: a 8-inch (20 cm) Columbiad and four 24-pounder carronades.

On September 20, the sidewheel steamer USS Water Witch entered the Mississippi River. Pickens and the armed towboat CSS Ivy were stationed at Head of Passes and withdrew to Fort Jackson. Water Witch fired 23 rounds at the two ships while they retreated before bombarding riverbank positions once left alone; she withdrew back to the Gulf of Mexico that evening, passively followed by Ivy. Union vessels entered the Mississippi in late September and early October. After occupying the Head of Passes, the Union naval force identified a location for a shore fortification and began preparing the site. When Commodore George N. Hollins collected all available naval forces for an attack on Union vessels at Head of Passes, Pickens was one of the ships that gathered at Fort Jackson on October 11. Hollins's fleet, led by the ironclad CSS Manassas, advanced downriver on the morning of October 12. Pickens was at the rear of the fleet, as her lack of engines would make it difficult to maneuver in battle conditions. Along with the gunboat CSS Jackson (which had been converted from a tugboat), Pickens guided fire rafts towards the Union positions during the battle. In the ensuing Battle of the Head of Passes, the Union ships abandoned the area in haste, with two temporarily running aground during the retreat. The Confederates destroyed a supply of wood earmarked for the planned fortification, captured the supply ship Joseph H. Toone, and lightly damaged the sloop-of-war USS Richmond. Manassas suffered significant damage during the fighting.

The fighting did not change the overall strategic situation, as the Union ships simply blockaded the outlets between Head of Passes and the Gulf of Mexico. When Hollins and most of his ships moved upriver to Kentucky beginning in November, Pickens and Washington, which had also been surrendered in 1861, remained behind at New Orleans. While the two ships primarily took taxes from blockade runners, they were left behind as a potential defense force for the city. During the rest of 1861 and early 1862, Pickens served on the lower part of the Mississippi River. On April 24, 14 Union Navy ships under the command of Flag Officer David Glasgow Farragut forced their way past Forts Jackson and Fort St. Philip, arriving at New Orleans on April 25. The same day, Pickens was burned to prevent her capture. During the burning, a sailor boarded the ship and removed her Confederate and old United States flags.

== Sources ==
- Chatelain, Neil P. (2020). Defending the Arteries of Rebellion: Confederate Naval Operations in the Mississippi River Valley, 1861–1865. El Dorado Hills, California: Savas Beatie. ISBN 978-1-61121-510-6.
- Civil War Naval Chronology, 1861–1865. Washington, D.C.: Naval History Division. 1961.
- Hannings, Bud (2010). Every Day of the Civil War: A Chronological Encyclopedia. Jefferson, North Carolina: McFarland & Co. ISBN 978-0-7864-4464-9.
- Hearn, Chester G. (1995). The Capture of New Orleans 1862. Baton Rouge, Louisiana: Louisiana State University Press. ISBN 0-8071-1945-8.
- Kennedy, Frances H., ed. (1998). The Civil War Battlefield Guide (2nd ed.). Boston/New York: Houghton Mifflin. ISBN 978-0-395-74012-5.
- Scharf, John Thomas (1887). History of the Confederate Navy from Its Organization to the Surrender of Its Last Vessel. New York: Rogers & Sherwood.
- Silverstone, Paul H. (2006). Civil War Navies 1855–1883. New York: Routledge. ISBN 978-0-415-97870-5.
- Wilson, Walter E. (2015). "The Civil War Blockade Running Adventures of the Louisiana Schooner William R. King". The Journal of the Louisiana Historical Association. 56 (3): 294–314.
