= USS Vincennes (1826) =

US Navy sloop of war

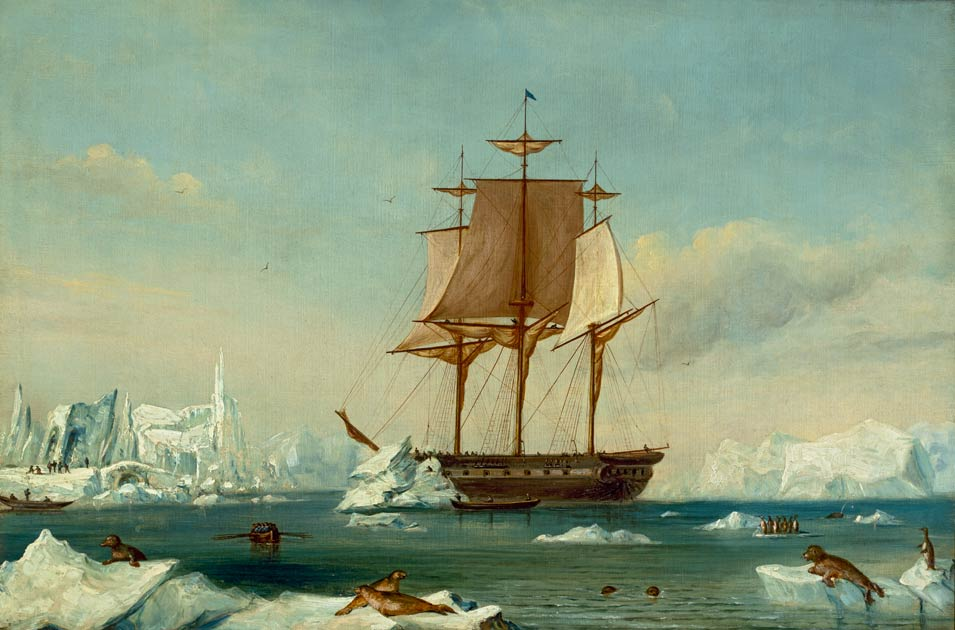
- 19th-century painting (based on a sketch by Lieutenant Charles Wilkes, USN), depicting USS Vincennes in Disappointment Bay, Antarctica, circa January–February 1840.

History

United States
- Name: USS Vincennes
- Namesake: Vincennes, Indiana
- Builder: Brooklyn Navy Yard
- Laid down: 1825
- Launched: 27 April 1826
- Commissioned: 27 August 1826
- Decommissioned: 28 August 1865
- Stricken: 1867 (est.)
- Fate: Sold, 5 October 1867

General characteristics
- Class & type: Boston-class sloop-of-war
- Displacement: 700 long tons (711 t)
- Length: 127 ft (39 m) p/p
- Beam: 33 ft 9 in (10.29 m)
- Draft: 16 ft 6 in (5.03 m)
- Propulsion: Sail
- Speed: 18.5 knots (rated)
- Complement: 80
- Armament: 18 guns

USS Vincennes was a 703-ton Boston-class sloop of war in the United States Navy from 1826 to 1865. During her service, Vincennes patrolled the Pacific, explored the Antarctic, and blockaded the Confederate Gulf coast in the Civil War. Named for the siege of Fort Vincennes of the American Revolutionary War, she was the first U.S. warship to circumnavigate the globe.

== Service history ==
Vincennes—the first American ship to be so named—was one of ten sloops of war whose construction was authorized by Congress on 3 March 1825. She was laid down at New York in 1825, launched on 27 April 1826, and commissioned on 27 August 1826, with Master Commandant William Compton Bolton in command.

The ship set sail for the first time on 3 September 1826, from New York bound for the Pacific by way of Cape Horn. She cruised extensively in that ocean, visiting the Hawaiian Islands in 1829 and made her way to Macau by 1830, under Commander William B. Finch. Her return voyage was made by way of China, the Philippines, the Indian Ocean, and the Cape of Good Hope. Ship chaplain Charles Samuel Stewart published a book about the voyage. After nearly four years, Vincennes arrived back in New York on 8 June 1830, becoming the first U.S. Navy ship to circumnavigate the Earth. Two days later the ship was decommissioned.

Following repairs and recommissioned, Vincennes then operated in the West Indies and the Gulf of Mexico as part of the West Indies Squadron in 1831–32. After a long bout of yellow fever, she was decommissioned again for a time in 1833 before sailing once more. She departed for a second Pacific deployment in 1833, becoming the first American warship to call at Guam. She again sailed around the globe to return to the U.S. East Coast in June 1836.

=== Supporting the Wilkes Expedition ===
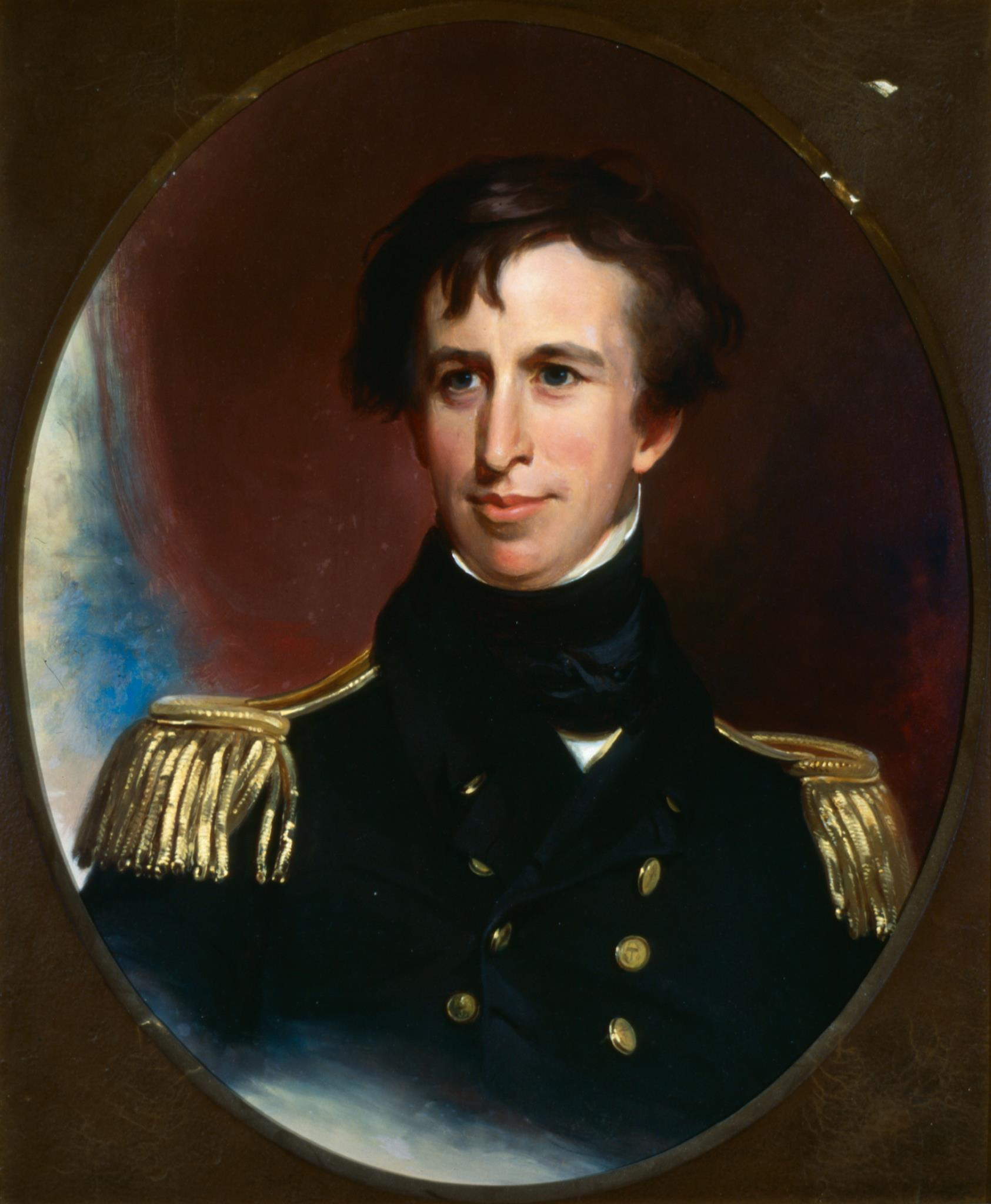
Lieutenant Charles Wilkes, commander of the United States Exploring Expedition 1838 - 1842

Decommissioned once again in 1836, while she underwent remodeling, she was refitted with a light spar deck and declared the flagship of the South Sea Surveying and Exploring Expedition to the Antarctic region. Commanded by Lieutenant Charles Wilkes, the expedition sailed from Hampton Roads in August 1838, and made surveys along the South American coast before making a brief survey of Antarctica in early 1839. Entering into the South Pacific in August and September 1839, her cartographers drafted charts of that area that are still used today.

Following survey operations and other scientific work along the west coast of South America and in the South Pacific during the rest of the year, in late 1839 Vincennes arrived at Sydney, Australia, her base for a pioneering cruise to Antarctica. She unintentionally exposed the lack of defences and security at Sydney Harbour when she slipped unnoticed into Sydney Harbour on 30 November 1839 under the cover of darkness. Between mid-January and mid-February 1840, she operated along the icy coast of the southernmost continent. The coast along which the ship sailed is today known as Wilkes Land, a name given on maps as early as 1841.

The remainder of her deployment included visits to the islands of the South Pacific, Hawaii, the Columbia River area, Puget Sound, California, Wake Island, the Philippines and South Africa. This third voyage around the world ended at New York in June 1842.

=== 1842–1847 operations ===
Vincennes was next assigned to the Home Squadron and placed under the command of Commander Franklin Buchanan, a distinguished officer destined to become the first Superintendent of the United States Naval Academy. She sailed to the West Indies and cruised off the Mexican coast until the summer of 1844. Though this duty proved relatively uneventful, Vincennes did rescue two grounded English brigs off the coast of Texas and received the thanks of the British government for this service. Buchanan was also ordered to prevent any attempted invasion by Mexico of the new Republic of Texas. This eventuality never materialized; and Vincennes returned to Hampton Roads on 15 August to enter dry dock.

On 4 June 1845, Vincennes sailed for the Far East under command of Captain Hiram Paulding. She was accompanied by the ship-of-the-line Columbus, under the command of Captain Thomas Wyman; and the two vessels formed a little squadron under the command of Commodore James Biddle, who carried a letter from Secretary of State John C. Calhoun to Caleb Cushing, American commissioner in China, authorizing Cushing to make the first official contact with the Japanese Government.

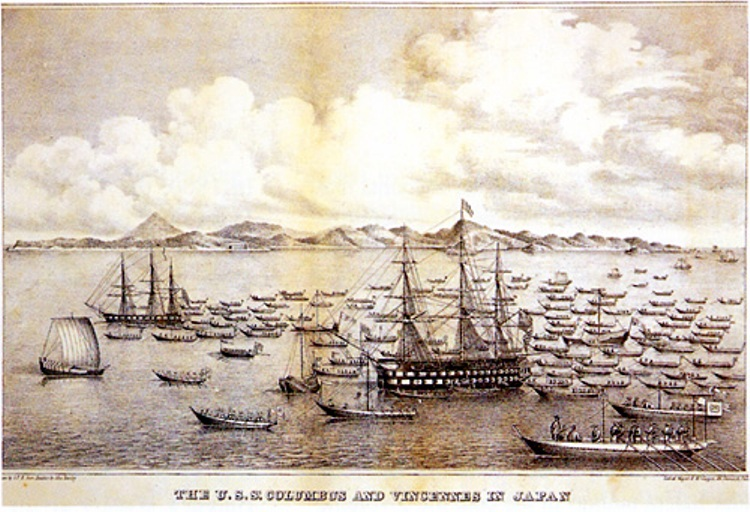
The Vincennes and Columbus in Japan.

The squadron sailed for Macau by way of Rio de Janeiro and the Cape of Good Hope. Commodore Biddle arrived safely in Macau only to find that Cushing had already left for home and that his successor, Alexander H. Everett, was too ill to make the trip. Therefore, Biddle determined to conduct the negotiations himself.

Accordingly, Vincennes and Columbus sailed for Japan on 7 July 1846 and anchored off Uraga on 19 July. The Japanese surrounded the vessels and allowed no one to land. Otherwise the visitors were treated with courtesy. However, Commodore Biddle's attempts to force the opening of feudal Japan to multinational trade were politely rebuffed, and the vessels weighed anchor on 29 July. Columbus returned to the United States by way of Cape Horn, but Vincennes remained on the China Station for another year before returning to New York on 1 April 1847. Here, she was decommissioned on the 9th, dry-docked, and laid up.

=== 1849–1860 operations ===
Vincennes remained in ordinary until 1849. Recommissioned on 12 November 1849, she sailed from New York exactly one month later, bound for Cape Horn and the west coast of South America. On 2 July 1850, while lying off Guayaquil, Ecuador, she harbored the Ecuadoran revolutionary General Elizalde for three days during one of that country's frequent civil disturbances. Sailing on to San Francisco, California, the vessel lost 36 members of her crew to the gold fever sweeping California at the time. Turning south, Vincennes cruised off South America until late 1851, closely monitoring the activities of revolutionaries ashore.

She made a courtesy call to the Hawaiian Islands at the end of the year and proceeded thence to Puget Sound where she arrived on 2 February 1852. She anchored briefly there and returned via San Francisco and the Horn to New York where she arrived on 21 September and was decommissioned on the 24th.

Following repairs and a period in ordinary, Vincennes was recommissioned on 21 March 1853 and sailed into Norfolk, Virginia on 13 May to join her second exploratory expedition, serving as flagship to Commander Cadwalader Ringgold's survey of the China Sea, the North Pacific, and the Bering Strait. Comdr. Ringgold was a veteran of the Wilkes expedition. The squadron stood out of Norfolk on 11 June 1853, rounded the Cape of Good Hope, and charted numerous islands and shoals in the Indian Ocean before arriving in China in March 1854. Here Commodore Matthew Calbraith Perry relieved Ringgold for medical reasons and gave command of the expedition to Lt. John Rodgers.

Vincennes sailed on to survey the Bonin and Ladrone Islands and returned to Hong Kong in February 1855. The expedition sailed again in March and surveyed the islands between the Ryūkyū chain and Japan, and then the Kurils. Vincennes left the squadron at Petropavlovsk, Russia, and entered the Bering Strait, sailing through to the northwest towards Wrangel Island. Ice barriers prevented the vessel from reaching this destination, but she came closer than any other previous ship. Vincennes returned to San Francisco in early October and later sailed for the Horn and New York, where she arrived on 13 July 1856 to complete yet another circumnavigation of the globe.

Vincennes operated with the African Squadron in 1857–1860.

=== American Civil War service ===
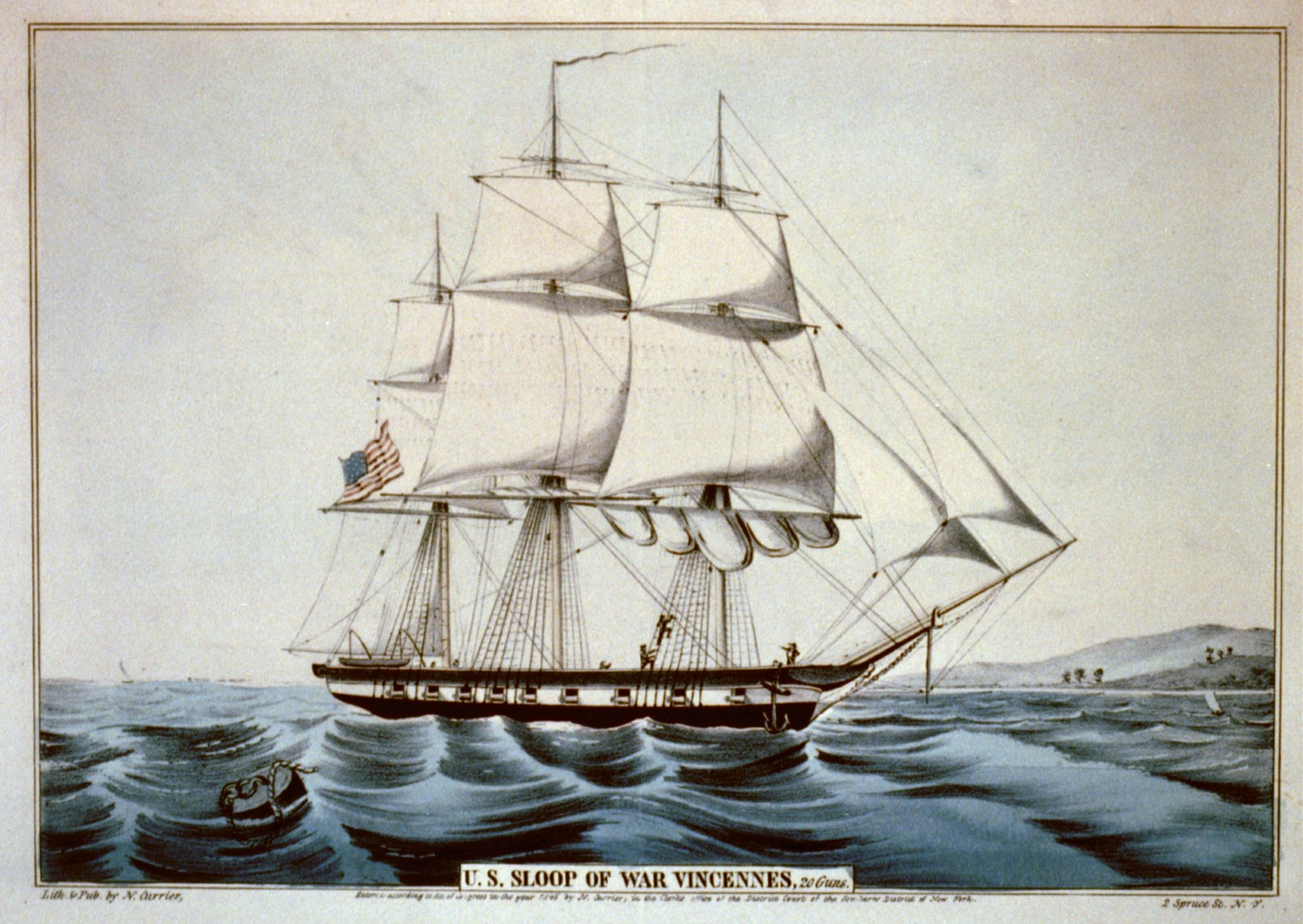
A colored lithograph of the USS Vincennes

After the outbreak of the American Civil War in April 1861, Vincennes was recommissioned on 29 June and assigned to duty in the Gulf Blockading Squadron. She arrived off Fort Pickens, Florida, on 3 September, and was ordered to assist in the occupation of Head of Passes, Mississippi River, and remain there on blockade duty. Though the Federal warships did successfully deploy, on 12 October 1861 the Confederate metal-sheathed ram Manassas and armed steamers Ivy and James L. Day drove the Union blockaders from Head of Passes in the Battle of the Head of Passes, forcing the Screw sloop-of-war Richmond and Vincennes aground. Vincennes was ordered abandoned and destroyed to prevent her capture, and her engineer set a slow match to the vessel's magazine while her men took refuge on other ships. However, her engineer cut the burning fuse and threw it overboard before the magazine could explode and, after the Confederate vessels withdrew early in the afternoon, Vincennes was refloated.

After the Confederate attack, the Union sloop-of-war continued on blockade duty off the Passes of the Mississippi, capturing the blockade-running British bark Empress, aground at North East Pass with a large cargo of coffee on 27 November. On 4 March 1862, she was ordered to proceed to Pensacola, Florida, to relieve Mississippi and spent the next six months shuttling between Pensacola and Mobile, Alabama, performing routine patrol and reconnaissance duty. On 4 October, she was ordered to assume command of the blockade off Ship Island, Mississippi, and to guard the pass out of Mississippi Sound. While so deployed, boat crews from the vessel and Clifton captured the barge H. McGuin in Bay St. Louis, Mississippi, on 18 July 1863. Vincennes also reported the capture of two boats laden with food on 24 December.

=== End-of-war service and decommissioning ===
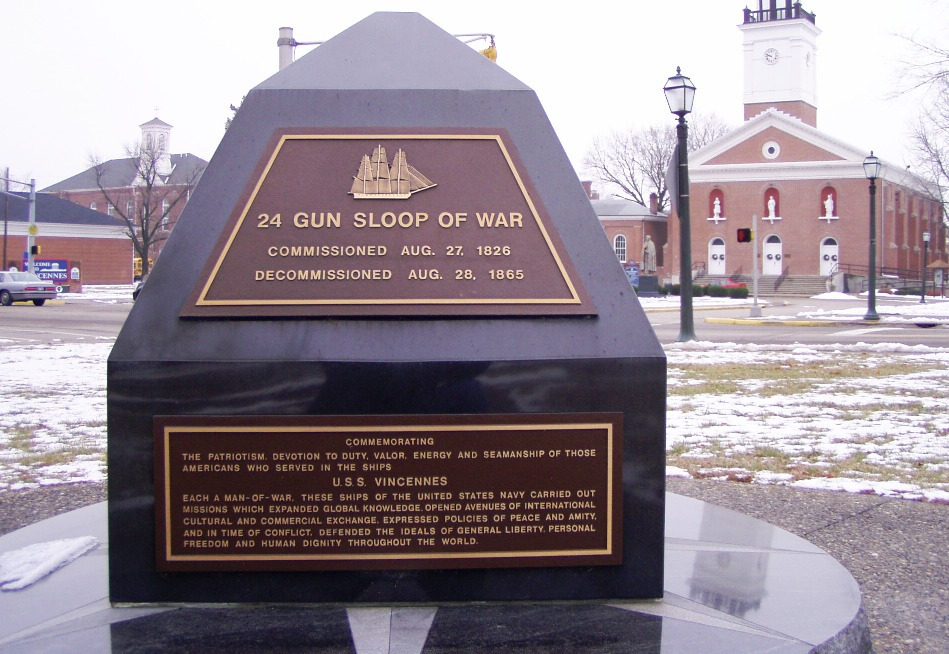
Monument to USS Vincennes in Vincennes, Indiana's Patrick Henry Square

Vincennes remained off Ship Island for the remainder of the war and was laid up in ordinary at the Boston Navy Yard on 28 August 1865. She was decommissioned in August 1865 and sold at public auction at Boston on 5 October 1867 for approximately $5,000.00.

== See also ==
- Mexican–American War
- European and American voyages of scientific exploration
- Union Navy
