= Battle of the Head of Passes =

Battle of the American Civil War

Coordinates: 29.157°N 89.254°W

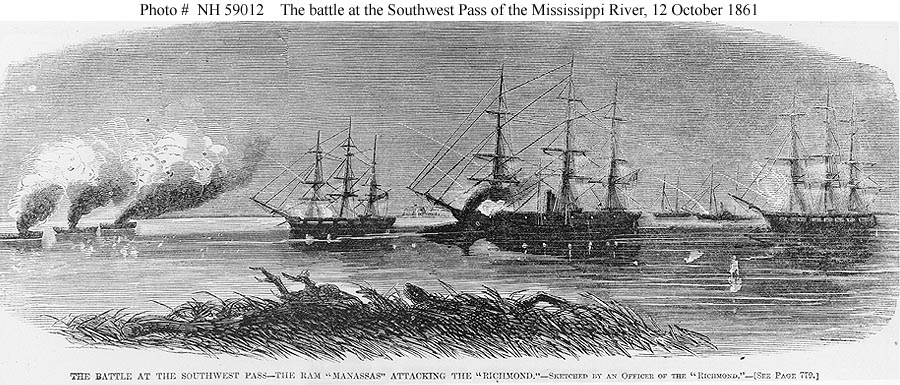
Date	October 12, 1861
Location	Head of Passes, Mississippi River Delta, Plaquemines Parish, Louisiana
Result	Confederate States victory

Belligerents
United States	(Confederate States of America) Confederate States

Commanders and leaders
John Pope	George N. Hollins

Strength
3 sloops-of-war 1 schooner 1 gunboat	1 ironclad 6 gunboats 3 fire rafts

Casualties and losses
None; 2 sloops-of-war damaged 1 schooner damaged	None; 1 ironclad damaged

The Battle of the Head of Passes was a bloodless naval battle of the American Civil War. It was a naval raid made by the Confederate river defense fleet, also known as the “mosquito fleet” in the local media, on ships of the Union blockade squadron anchored at the Head of Passes. The mosquito fleet deployed three fire rafts, which were ignited and followed the ironclad ram CSS Manassas into the action. The attack occurred after moonset in the early hours of October 12, 1861, and routed the Union fleet, which fled in disorder down the Southwest pass of the delta. After sunrise Commodore George N. Hollins, running low on ammunition and fuel, ordered the mosquito fleet to withdraw upriver.

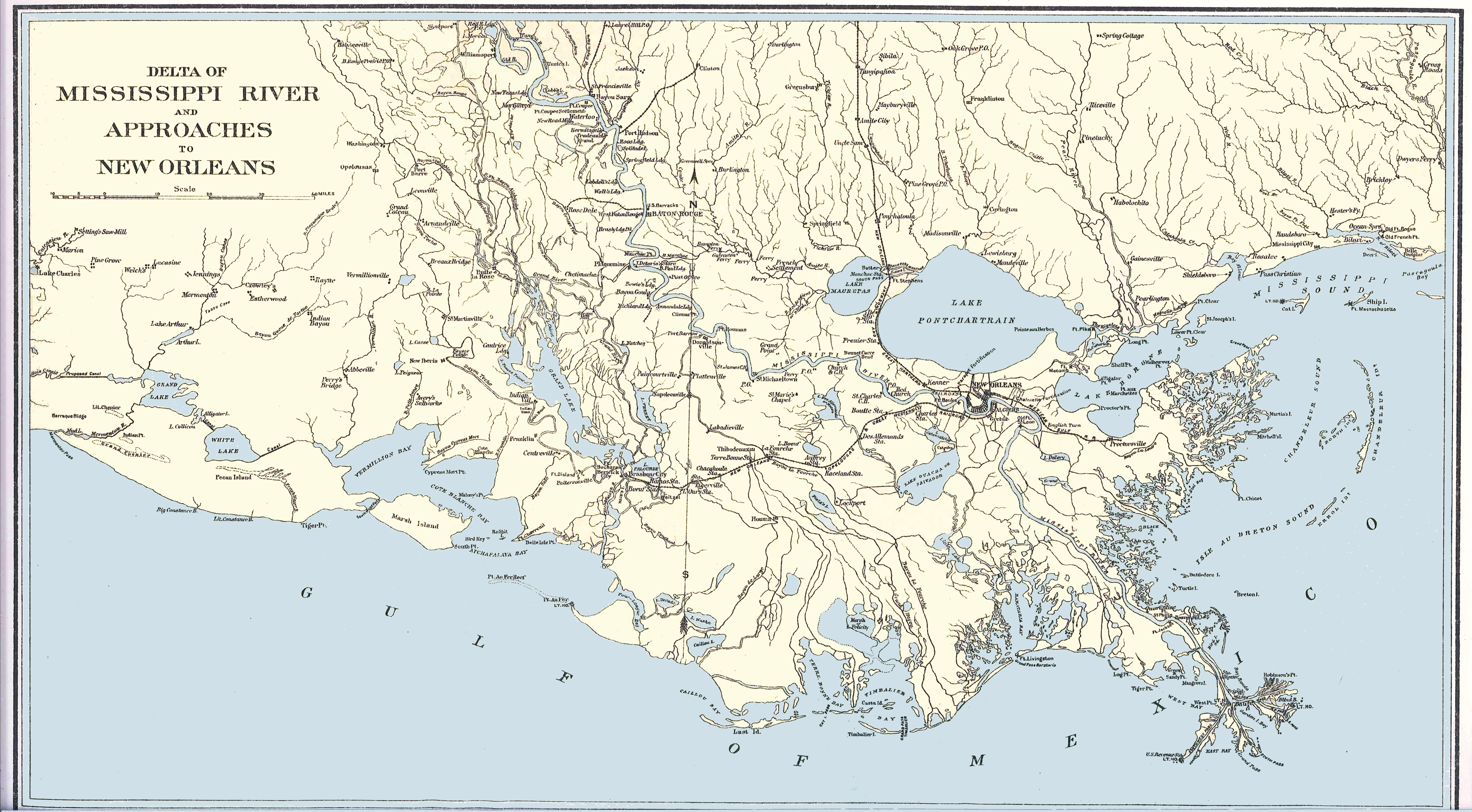
Map depicting the delta of the Mississippi River and approaches to New Orleans, printed by the Government printing office in 1904 as part of the Official Records of the Union and Confederate Navies

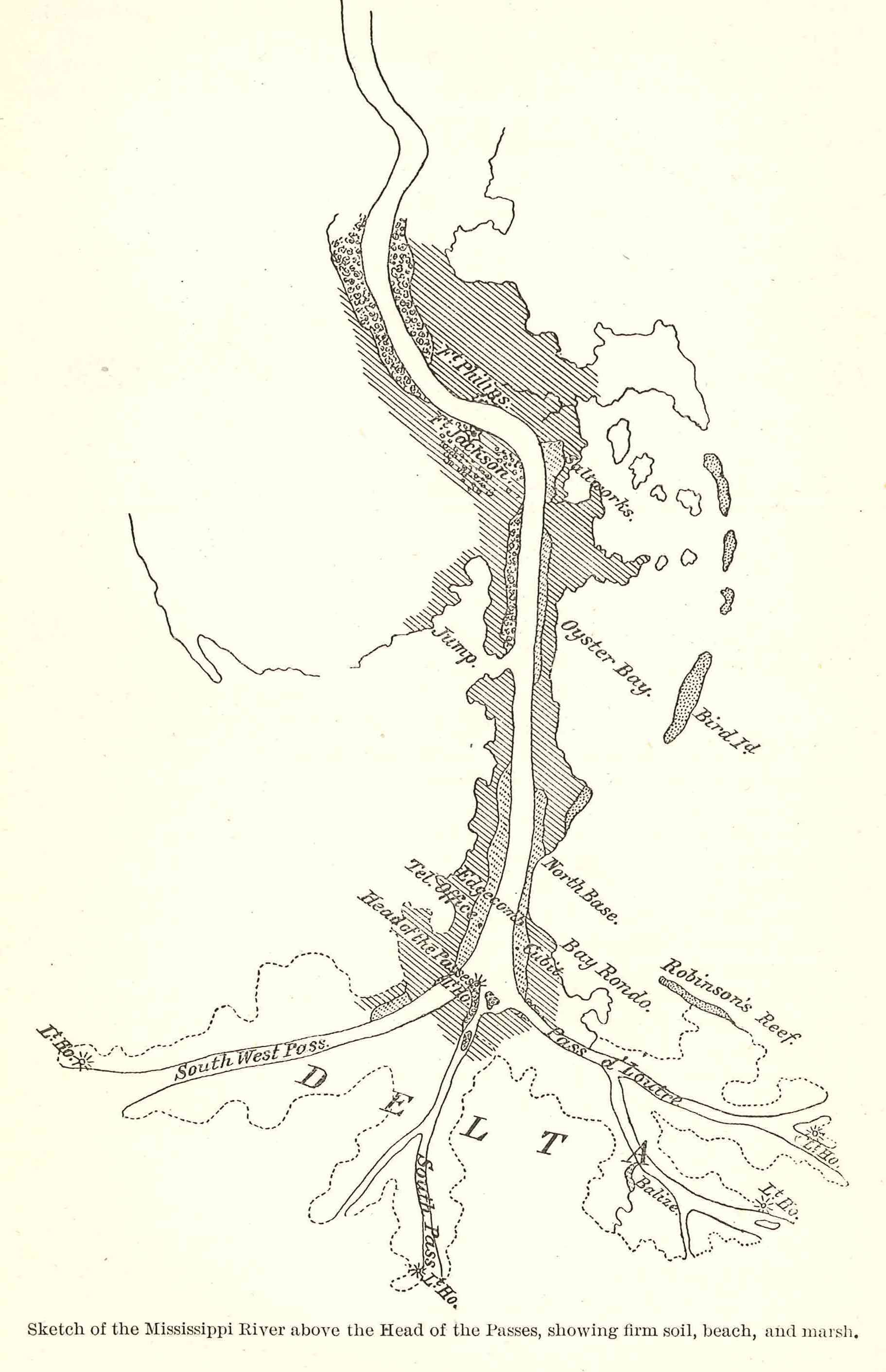
Sketch map of the Mississippi River and the Head of Passes of the Louisiana delta

== Background ==
Louisiana seceded from the Union on January 26, 1861. A navy department was established by the newly created Confederate government by February 21, 1861. Commodore Lawrence Rousseau was sent by Confederate Naval Secretary Stephen Mallory to manage the naval defense of New Orleans. His efforts to assemble a fleet were undercut when Confederate President Jefferson Davis began to authorize the distribution of letters of marque and reprisal. These documents allowed the holder to capture Union shipping for prize money from the Confederate government. Many ships in Louisiana were snapped up by private investors hoping to make a profit. Rousseau was only able to purchase six civilian riverboats for conversion into a makeshift navy. Mallory then replaced Rousseau with George N. Hollins, a former US Navy veteran who was promoted to commodore and sent to New Orleans on July 31, 1861. Hollins finished organizing the haphazard collection of six lightly armed riverboats. The Confederate strategy was to complete two large ironclads, the CSS Louisiana and CSS Mississippi, to defend New Orleans and the lower Mississippi. (Two more ironclads were laid down in Memphis to defend the upper Mississippi.) However, none of these would be launched until 1862. These projects, others authorized by Mallory, and civilian conversion of ships into privateers tied up most of the resources needed to construct or modify more vessels for the mosquito fleet. Although New Orleans was the largest city in the Confederacy, the limitations of the Confederate industrial base hampered expansion of her fledgling navy.

On the Union Navy side, command and operations were much more focused. With a longstanding naval staff and command structure, there was less time wasted once hostilities at Fort Sumter established the inevitability of naval action. The strategy of a Union blockade was formulated by General Winfield Scott and proclaimed by President Abraham Lincoln on April 19, 1861. The blockade began at the Outer Pass of the Mississippi Delta when the USS Brooklyn arrived on May 27, 1861. The USS Powhatan arrived off the Southwest pass on April 30. The arrival of these vessels was much sooner than anyone in New Orleans had imagined, and the panic-stricken rush that occurred when neutral shipping was given a fifteen-day grace period to vacate the port was an ugly dose of reality to stack against the concept of business as usual. The arrival of the Niagara and Minnesota solidified the reality of the blockade. Aboard the Niagara was Captain William W. McKean, the new commander of the Mississippi blockade. On October 10, 1861, McKean ordered four Union ships to occupy the Head of the Passes, closing all exits from the lower delta at one point.

For the Confederates, the prospect of the Union fleet occupying a base at the Head of Passes was intolerable. It effectively sealed New Orleans off from the sea and was a convenient point for an attack upon Fort Jackson and Fort St. Philip, the last line of defense for the city. Hollins responded by taking his flagship, CSS Calhoun, southward from New Orleans to concentrate the mosquito fleet at Fort Jackson. Once there he sent CSS McRae with a boarding party under Lieutenant Alexander F. Warley to commandeer the privateer ironclad ram Manassas at gunpoint for the Confederate Navy. John A. Stevenson, representing the privateer owners of the ram, was so infuriated he departed the vessel in tears. With the addition of the Manassas, Hollin's small fleet seemed to have a chance against the much bigger vessels of the Union blockade. After moonset on October 12, in the hours of early morning, Hollins took his fleet south to engage the Union force at the Head of Passes. Five months before the famous Battle of Hampton Roads, the first ironclad of the Civil War was going into battle.

== Battle ==
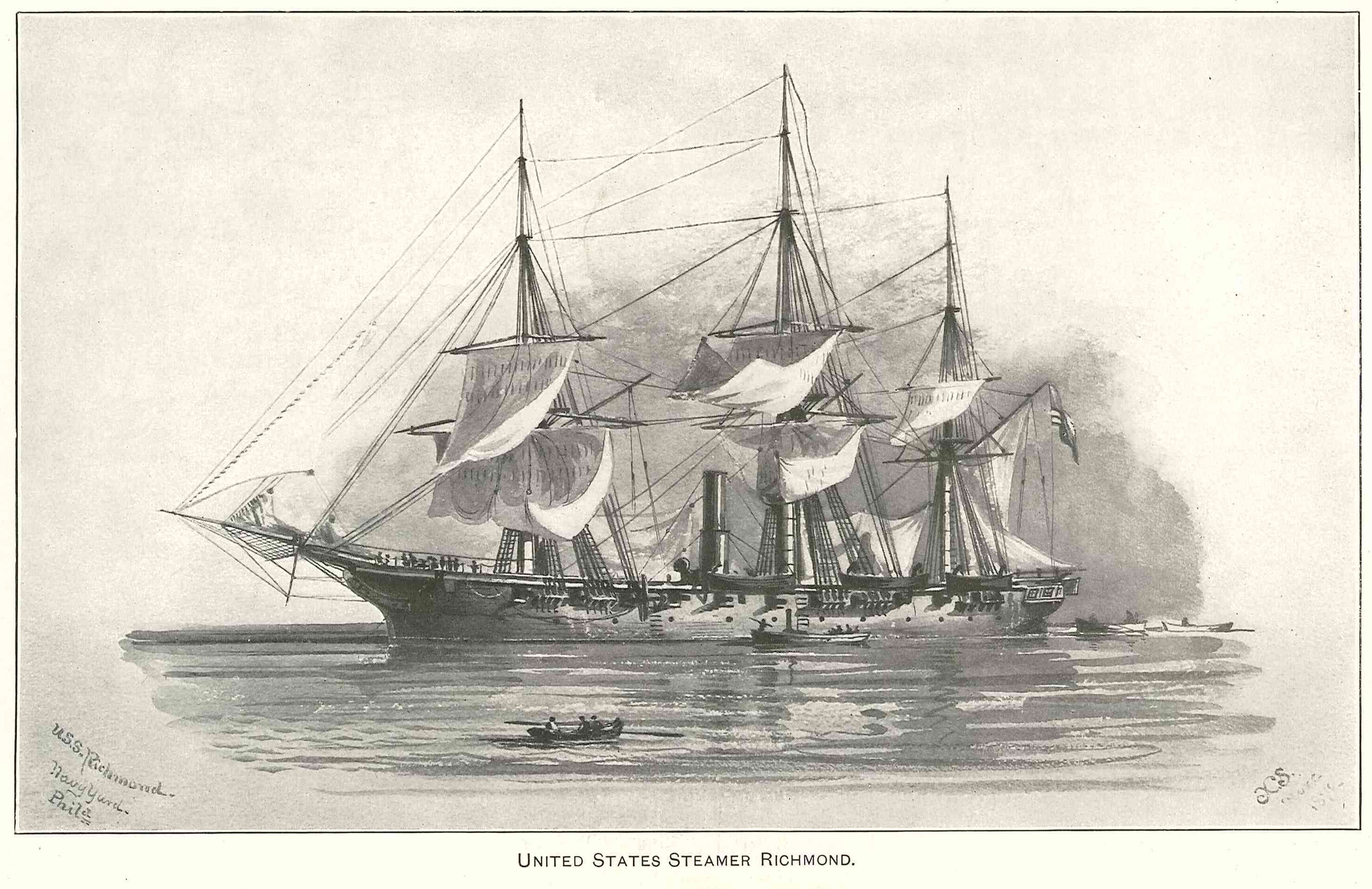
USS Richmond, wooden steam sloop of the Union fleet. Her primary opponent, CSS Manassas proved to be slow and difficult to maneuver on the Mississippi River.

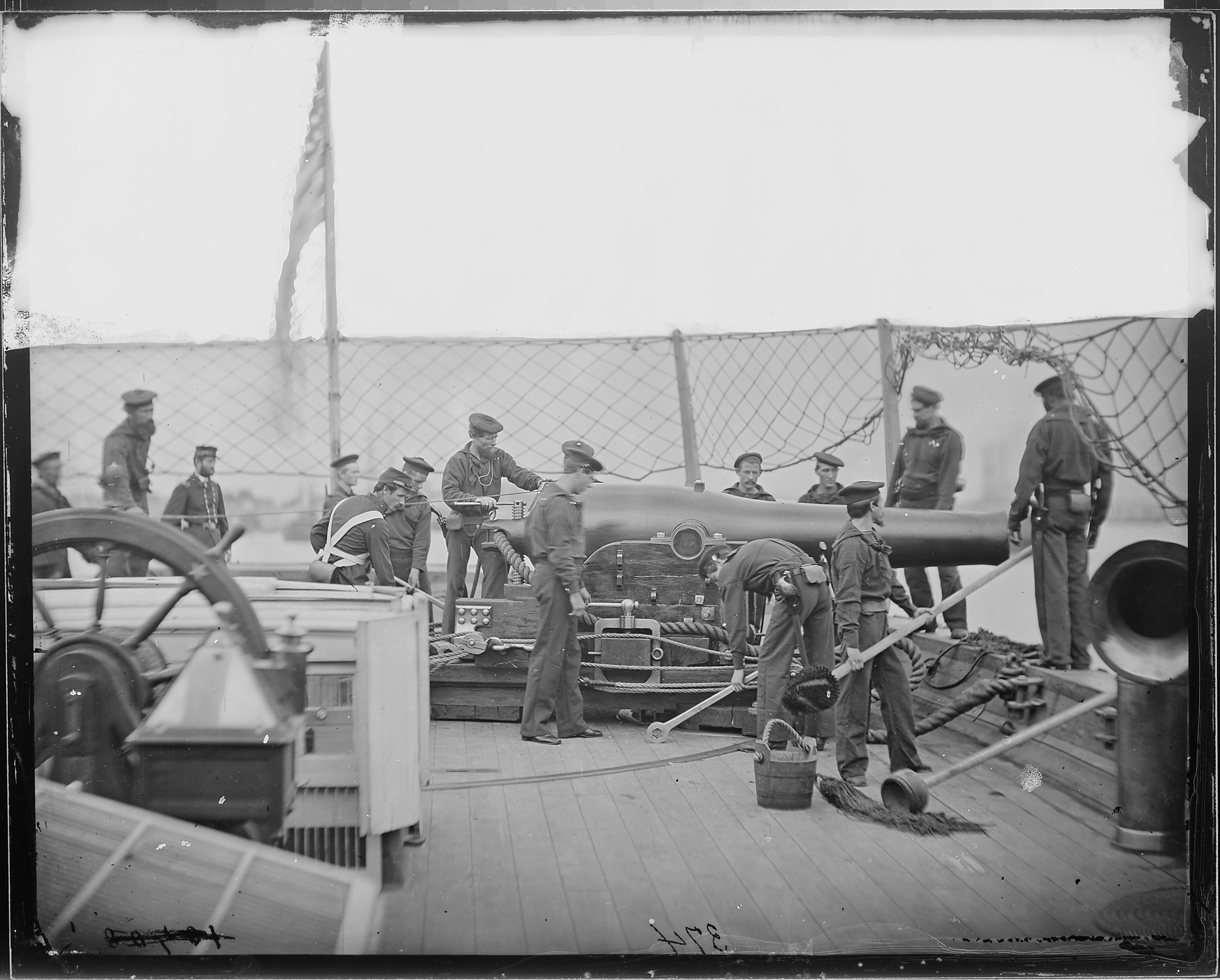
Dahlgren 9-inch smooth bore cannon and crew on the stern pivot position of a Union gunboat

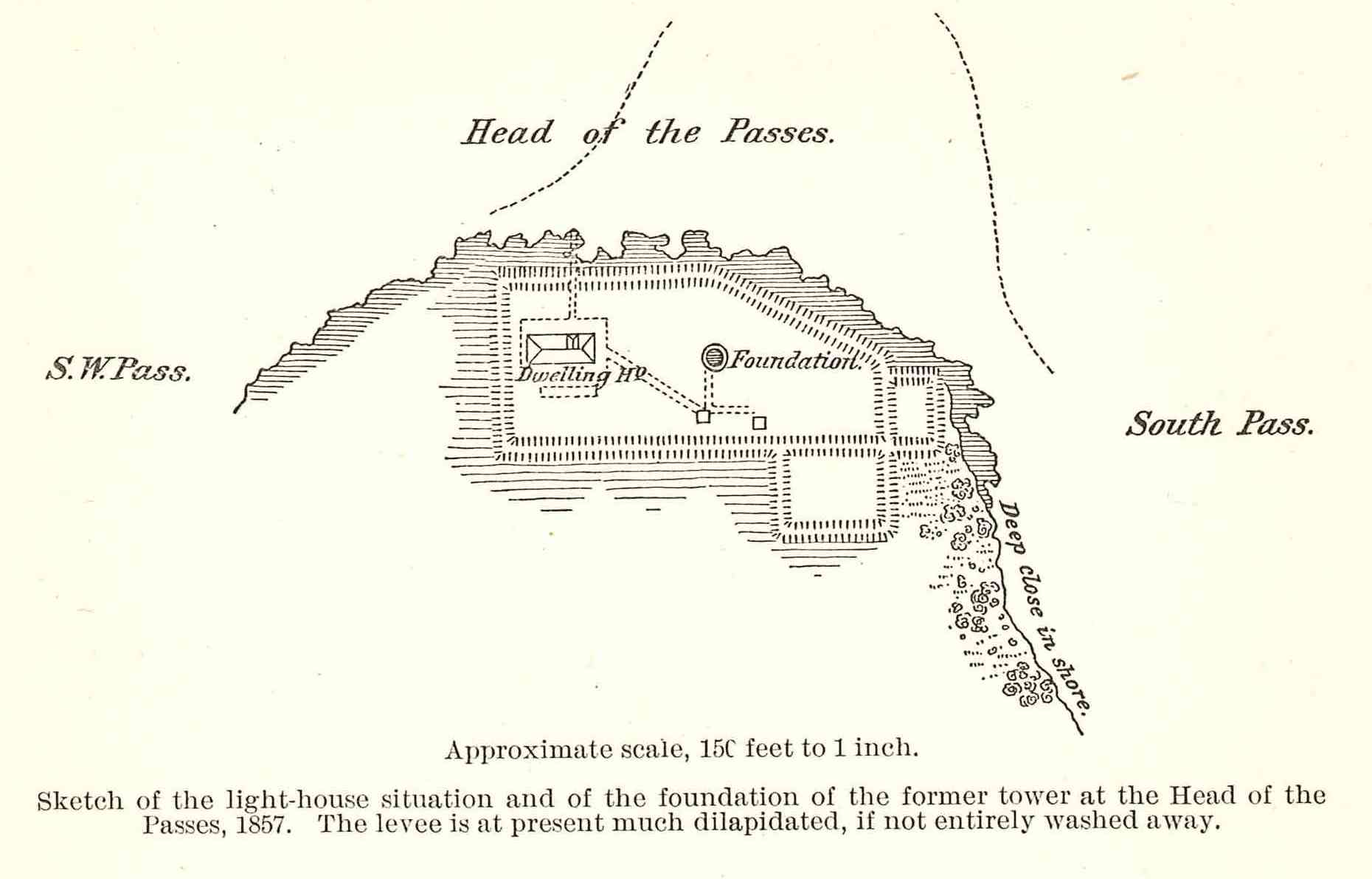
Sketch map of the lighthouse station, Head of Passes, proposed site of the Union ten gun 9-inch smooth bore battery

Sketch map of the ship positions at the time Manassas rammed Richmond

The flagship of the Union fleet occupying the Head of the Passes was the formidable USS Richmond. This vessel, a screw sloop with a ship rig, displaced 2,700 tons and mounted seven Dahlgren 9-inch smooth bores to a side and one rifled gun as a stern pivot. She also remounted one of her broadside guns as a bow pivot gun after anchoring by the lighthouse at the Head of Passes. Manned by an experienced crew of 260 well trained sailors, she was a behemoth compared to any vessel of the mosquito fleet. Each of the Dahlgren guns weighed 9,020 pounds and was 9 feet long. One broadside from the Richmond carried more firepower than could be mustered by the entire Rebel fleet. Each 73.5 pound exploding shell would wreak havoc on a cotton clad vessel. Supporting the Richmond were the Vincennes and Preble. Each ship mounted 14 and 16 32-pounder smooth bores respectively, and were sloops of war with no power other than sail. The Vincennes also mounted a 9-inch smooth bore as a bow pivot gun. This was one of the guns intended for the shore battery at the lighthouse. Supporting the sail sloops was the Water Witch, a side-wheel steam powered gunboat mounting one 32-pound smoothbore and one rifled 12-pound howitzer. The Water Witch was to provide towing capacity for the sail vessels under unfavorable wind conditions.

The weak link in this concentrated chain of firepower was the fleet commander and captain of the Richmond, Captain John Pope. The range of the CSS Ivy's rifled gun alarmed Pope. On October 9, Pope reported to McKean, “I have to report that the Ivy has been down this afternoon and has made an attack upon these ships, throwing shot and shell over this ship and the Preble, keeping herself entirely out of range of any of the guns on either of the ships, her shot passing some 500 yards over this ship, which makes it evident we are entirely at the mercy of the enemy. We are liable to be driven from here at any moment, and, situated as we are, our position is untenable. I may be captured at any time by a pitiful little steamer mounting only one gun.” The Ivy’s rifled gun did out range Pope’s smooth bores, but at extreme range could not score any hits. Pope neglected to set up picket boats, ranging posts or illuminated marker buoys, illumination fires, or to pre-plan concentrations of his ship's gunfire.

Hollins’ plan of attack was to put the CSS Manassas in the lead. Following would be Tuscarora, McRae, and Ivy moving three abreast. Each gunboat would push a fire raft, which would be ignited after a signal from Manassas indicating that she had crushed the USS Richmond. The fire rafts were chained together, and would be released by the gunboats to engulf the Union fleet as it milled helplessly after the destruction of the Richmond. If the Manassas was turned into an oven in the process, Hollins considered the sacrifice worthwhile. The Calhoun, the flagship, would remain in the rear, as would the Jackson and Pickens, seeking targets of opportunity.

The Preble, anchored 200 yards upstream of the Richmond, was the first to detect the Manassas. She raised a red signal light into her rigging as a warning and opened fire. The Manassas presented only two and a half feet of armored deck above the waterline; the 32-pound shot of the Preble went high over her deck and scored no hits. The Manassas rang for flank speed, her engineers fed her fireboxes with the most flammable material on hand, and she surged forward in a dense cloud of black smoke and sparks from her stacks. The Richmond was anchored just off the lighthouse at the head of the Southwest pass on the east bank. Lashed to her port side was the coal schooner Joseph H. Toone. The Manassas struck the Richmond a glancing blow on her port side just aft of the bow, wedging briefly between the Toone and Richmond. The momentum of the Manassas tore the Toone loose from Richmond and the Manassas continued past the Richmond’s stern. One of the two engines of the Manassas was torn loose by the impact, and she lost power. She turned away from the Richmond and moved slowly back upriver.

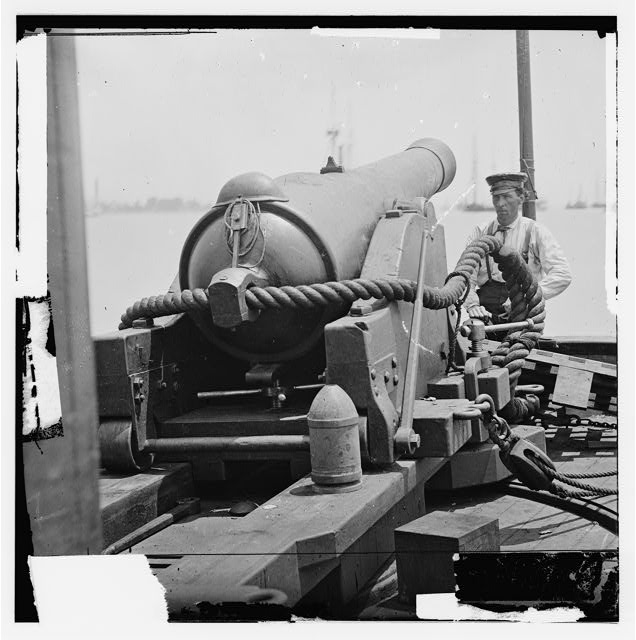
6.4-inch banded rifle, the weapon type used as the bow pivot gun on the CSS Ivy. Note the 100-pound conical projectile at the right rear of the gun carriage. This weapon outranged all of the guns in Pope's fleet.

As a signal to release the fire rafts she was to fire three rockets. The first of these rockets was fumbled and flew back inside the Manassas, briefly panicking her crew. Recovering, the three rockets were fired. Alarmed by the rafts, the vessels of the Union fleet slipped their anchor cables and moved downriver along the Southwest Passage, firing at the Manassas while doing so. Some of these projectiles knocked down one of the stacks of the Manassas, her only vulnerable projections above the rounded upper armor deck. Filling the ship with smoke while the crew cut loose the damaged stack, she grounded on the mud on the west bank of the head of the passes. The Union fleet headed to the southwest, pursued closely by the Confederate gunboats. The fire rafts grounded on the west bank of the southwest passage, south of Manassas. The rebel gunboats, once freed of the glare of the rafts between them and the targets, opened fire on the Union fleet.

The Richmond grounded broadside to the bar in the center of the river mouth, and opened fire on the mosquito fleet. In turn the fleet maneuvered up river just out of range of the Richmond's smooth bores, and returned fire with their longer ranged rifled guns. Despite the volumes of projectiles launched, few hits were scored. None of the Rebel vessels were hit; the Richmond was only hit twice, one shot wrecking one of the boats stored on the main deck, while another passed through a gun port and come to rest in the hull. By ten o’clock the mosquito fleet was running low on coal and ammunition. Hollins then ordered the fleet back upriver to Fort Jackson. The Manassas was taken back to the forts under tow.

In the last phase of the battle, Captain Handy of the Vincennes misread a signal the Richmond made to the vessels outside the bar to “Get Underway”. Handy ordered the engineer to set and light a fuse to the magazine of the Vincennes to blow her up, then ordered the crew to abandon ship and report to the Richmond. Fortunately for the Vincennes, the engineer lit the fuse to the magazine as ordered, then cut off the burning end and threw it overboard. When no explosion was forthcoming, Handy and crew were ordered back to their ship by Captain Pope.

== Aftermath ==
Hollins returned to a hero's acclaim in New Orleans. Exaggerated accounts of the accomplishments of the mosquito fleet were published in the newspapers of New Orleans and other Confederate cities. The obvious superior strength of the Union fleet made the accomplishment an even more enviable feat. Aside from the temporary rout of the Union ships there was little gain. Other than gleefully burning the timbers the Union fleet left at the Southwest Pass Lighthouse for a proposed shore battery, there was only a captured cutter filled with abandoned cutlasses and the crewless Toone. The schooner Toone still contained 15 tons of coal, but was a former prize of the Union fleet and an old leaky tub. The most severely damaged ship of the battle proved to be the Manassas; most of the damage occurring when she rammed the Richmond, rather than from enemy fire. The damage she did to the Richmond was a significant hull leak below the waterline, but this was not enough to sink or disable the Richmond.

The Manassas proved to be a disappointment. She was not fast or maneuverable enough to bring her iron ram into decisive action. The Richmond was not crushed with one blow, and once the Union fleet was underway the Manassas was completely ineffective, a one shot weapon system. However, its psychological impact on the Union Navy was tremendous, and lingered well beyond the river battle. Pope wrote to Flag-Officer McKean on Oct.14: "Everyone is in great dread of that infernal ram. I keep a guard boat out upriver during the night." This apprehension would come to be known as "ram fever". In turn, the gunboats of the mosquito fleet were quite capable of outmaneuvering the Union fleet, but too light to damage it.

The Union naval command was mortified by the embarrassing setback. Flag-officer McKean, commanding the blockade at the river mouth stated, “…and I am sorry to be obliged to say that the more I hear and learn of the facts the more disgraceful it does appear.” Union Naval Secretary Gideon Wells referred to the incident as “Pope’s Run”. Long after the event, Admiral David Dixon Porter stated, “Put this matter in any light you may, it is the most ridiculous affair that ever took place in the American Navy.” Despite the outrage, the damage was easily repaired. On the 17th of October the USS South Carolina and the Vincennes were sent in pursuit of the pestiferous CSS Ivy. Even though the Ivy was joined by another rebel steamer, both were driven up the Southwest passage to the Head of Passes where the chase was abandoned due to inability to close the range on the rebel vessels. The Richmond was sent to Key West, Florida, for temporary repair. The resignation of Captain Pope was accepted for health reasons. Captain Handy was sent east on the first dispatch ship. The West Gulf Blockading Squadron was organized under the command of Flag Officer David G. Farragut and sent to the Mississippi delta in far greater force. This counteroffensive would result in the Battle of Forts Jackson and St. Philip.

== Notes ==
Abbreviations used in these notes
Official atlas: Atlas to accompany the official records of the Union and Confederate armies.
ORA (Official records, armies): War of the Rebellion: a compilation of the official records of the Union and Confederate Armies.
ORN (Official records, navies): Official records of the Union and Confederate Navies in the War of the Rebellion.
