= USS Pope =

USS Pope may refer to the following ships of the United States Navy:

- USS Pope (DD-225), a Clemson-class destroyer, commissioned in 1920 and sunk in battle in 1942.
- USS Pope (DE-134), an Edsall-class destroyer escort, commissioned in 1943 and decommissioned in 1946.

== See also ==
- USS General John Pope (AP-110), a troop transport which saw service during World War II and later as a commercial freighter.
