= USS Pope (DE-134) =

Edsall-class destroyer

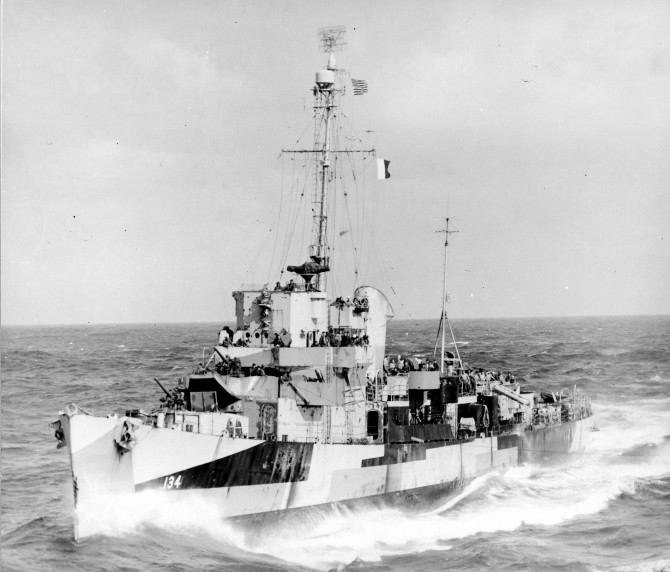
- USS Pope (DE-134)

History

United States
- Namesake: John Pope
- Builder: Consolidated Steel Corporation, Orange, Texas
- Laid down: 14 July 1942
- Launched: 12 January 1943
- Commissioned: 25 June 1943
- Decommissioned: 17 May 1946
- Stricken: 2 January 1971
- Honours and awards: 3 Battle Stars plus the Presidential Unit Citation
- Fate: Sold 22 August 1973, scrapped

General characteristics
- Class & type: Edsall-class destroyer escort
- Displacement: 1,253 tons standard; 1,590 tons full load
- Length: 306 feet (93.27 m)
- Beam: 36.58 feet (11.15 m)
- Draft: 10.42 full load feet (3.18 m)
- Propulsion: 4 Fairbanks-Morse diesel engines, 4 diesel-generators, 6,000 ship (4.5 MW), 2 screws
- Speed: 21 knots (39 km/h)
- Range: 9,100 nmi. at 12 knots; (17,000 km at 22 km/h)
- Complement: 8 officers, 201 enlisted
- Armament: 3 × single 3 in (76 mm)/50 guns; 1 × twin 40 mm AA guns; 8 × single 20 mm AA guns; 1 × triple 21 in (533 mm) torpedo tubes; 8 × depth charge projectors; 1 × depth charge projector (hedgehog); 2 × depth charge tracks

USS Pope (DE-134) was an Edsall-class destroyer escort built for the United States Navy during World War II. She served in the Atlantic Ocean and provided destroyer escort protection against submarine and air attack for Navy vessels and convoys.

She was named after commodore John Pope, born 17 December 1798 in Sandwich, Massachusetts. This ship also commemorated the destroyer USS Pope (DD-225) that had been sunk in the Battle of the Java Sea in 1942. She was laid down by Consolidated Steel Co., Orange, Texas, 14 July 1942; launched 12 January 1943; sponsored by Mrs. Rae W. Fabens, and commissioned 25 June 1943.

== World War II North Atlantic operations ==
After a shakedown cruise off Bermuda, USS Pope escorted her first convoy eastwards to Casablanca, arriving on 23 September 1943. Subsequently, she escorted two more convoys into the Mediterranean Sea. She then began work with Task Group TG 22.3, an antisubmarine task group centered on the aircraft carrier USS Guadalcanal. On 9 April 1944, Pope's task group sank the German submarine U-515 off French Morocco, and on 4 June, she participated in the capture of U-505 west of Cape Blanche. For her part in that action, USS Pope received the U.S. Presidential Unit Citation. Pope continued operations with USS Guadalcanal in the Atlantic Ocean and the Caribbean Sea until the end of the war in the Atlantic and Europe. She assisted in the sinking of the U-boat U-546 on 24 April 1945.

Notable crew members were science writer Martin Gardner and pharmacologist Alexander Shulgin. An experience following infection on board led to Shulgin's interest in the interface between the mind and molecular matter and his decision to work in psychopharmacology.

== End-of-war and post-war operations ==
Shortly after World War II hostilities ceased, Pope, with USS Pillsbury, escorted U-858, that had surrendered in the North Atlantic, to Cape May, New Jersey; then Pope escorted another convoy across the Atlantic. After returning to the U.S., Pope performed plane guard duties for the aircraft carrier USS Solomons off Norfolk, Virginia and Mayport, Florida, and then she began withdrawal from service.

=== Post-war decommissioning ===
USS Pope was decommissioned on 17 May 1946 at Green Cove Springs, Florida, and then she entered the Atlantic Reserve Fleet, where she remained into 1970 when she was scrapped.

== Awards ==
Pope received three battle stars for World War II service in addition to the Presidential Unit Citation. The battle stars were awarded for Asiatic Fleet operations and one for Makassar Strait as well as in the Badoeg Strait.
