= John Pope (naval officer) =

American naval officer (1798–1876)

John Pope (17 December 1798 – 14 January 1876) was an officer in the United States Navy during the American Civil War.

== Biography ==
Born in Sandwich, Massachusetts, Pope was appointed midshipman from Maine on 30 May 1816. Prior to the Civil War, he served in the Mediterranean, West Indian, Brazil, African and East India Squadrons.

From 1 July to 24 October 1861, he was attached to the Gulf Squadron commanding USS Richmond. He participated in the search for CSS Sumter in the West Indies while on his way to join the Gulf Blockading Squadron, assisted in the blockade of the passes of the Mississippi River and took part in the engagement with Confederate States' vessels at the Battle of the Head of Passes on 12 October 1861.

He was relieved at his own request on account of ill health, was later promoted to commodore on 16 July 1862 and then retired. He died on 14 January 1876 in Dorchester, Massachusetts.

== Namesake ==
Two ships have been named USS Pope for him.
