= USS Pope (DD-225) =

Clemson-class destroyer

Coordinates: 04°00′S 111°30′E

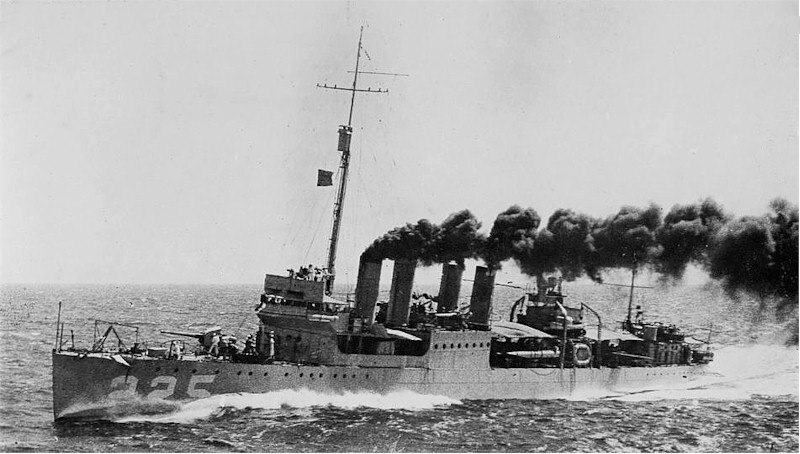
- USS Pope (DD-225) steaming at high speed with her guns manned during short-range battle practice off the coast of Luzon, Philippine Islands, on 15 January 1924.

History

United States
- Name: Pope
- Namesake: John Pope
- Builder: William Cramp & Sons, Philadelphia
- Yard number: 491
- Laid down: 9 September 1919
- Launched: 23 March 1920
- Commissioned: 27 October 1920
- Stricken: 8 May 1942
- Fate: Sunk by Japanese aircraft, 1 March 1942

General characteristics
- Class & type: Clemson-class destroyer
- Displacement: 1,190 tons
- Length: 314 ft 5 in (95.83 m)
- Beam: 31 ft 9 in (9.68 m)
- Draft: 9 ft 3 in (2.82 m)
- Propulsion: 26,500 shp (19,800 kW); geared turbines, 2 screws
- Speed: 35 kn (65 km/h; 40 mph)
- Complement: 101 officers and enlisted
- Armament: 4 x 4 in (100 mm) guns; 1 x 3 in (76 mm) gun; 2 .30 cal (7.62 mm) machine guns; 12 x 21 inch (533 mm) torpedo tubes

USS Pope (DD-225) was a Clemson-class destroyer in the United States Navy that served during World War II. She was the first ship named for John Pope.

== Construction and commissioning ==
Pope was laid down 9 September 1919 and launched 23 March 1920 from William Cramp & Sons; sponsored by Mrs. William S. Benson; and commissioned 27 October 1920 at Philadelphia.

== Service history ==
Pope was initially placed in reduced commission at Philadelphia and assigned to Squadron 3, Division 39 of the Atlantic Reserve Fleet. During 1921 she alternated between her winter base at Charleston, South Carolina and her summer one at Newport, Rhode Island and escorted President Warren G. Harding to Plymouth, Massachusetts 30 July – 1 August. She engaged in maneuvers with the battleship divisions off Guantanamo Bay from 12 January until her return to Philadelphia 27 April.

After a refit, Pope departed 12 May for duty in the Pacific. She passed through the Straits of Gibraltar 3 July and transited the Suez Canal 15–25 July. Pope joined Squadron 15, Division 43 of the Asiatic Fleet at Yantai, China 26 August and participated in fleet exercises off Yantai until her departure 28 October for her winter base at Cavite, Philippines.

In the Orient, Pope protected American lives and interests during the civil strife in China. She first served with the Yangtze River Patrol 9 September – 9 October 1923 and continued to make her presence known through repeated patrols until 1931.

Notable exceptions were duty off Japan in connection with the United States Army "Round the World Flight" in 1924, a visit to French Indochina in 1926, and a visit to Japan in 1929. From 1931 until 1937, the Pope continued to "show the flag" off the China coast, during the summers and spent the winters in the Philippines engaging in division maneuvers. She was reassigned to Squadron 5, Division 15 on 3 February 1933. Pope made visits to French Indochina in 1935 and in 1938, two visits to Japan in 1934 and 1935 and one to the Dutch East Indies in 1936.

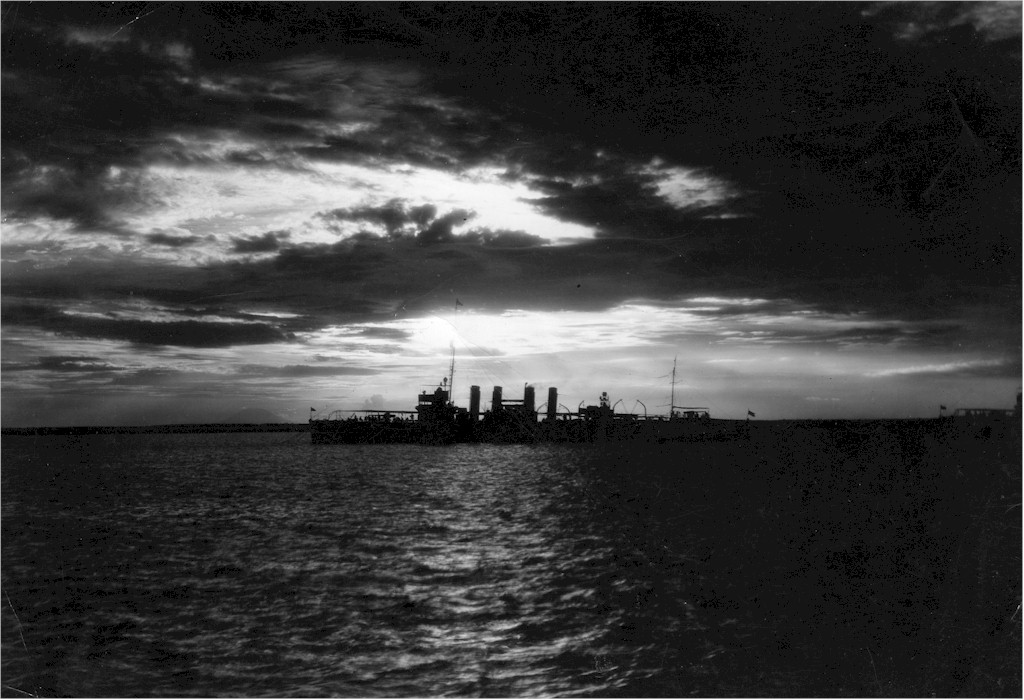
Pope operating off Japan between 1929 and 1933

Increased tension on China's northern borders due to the Japanese invasion of Manchuria made it necessary for Pope to evacuate Americans from northern Chinese ports such as Lao Yao and Qingdao to Shanghai beginning 19 September 1937. From 15 July to 20 September 1938, she cruised in Chinese waters off Qinhuangdao and returned 5 June 1939 with the South China Patrol force removing American consulates and nationals. Pope was stationed off Shantou and Beidaihe during 14 June – 19 August, observing the Japanese Navy en route to Shantou and the subsequent bombing and occupation of the city. She remained in this area until her return to Manila 12 October for the Neutrality Patrol off the Philippines. Pope was transferred to Division 59 of the Asiatic Fleet 6 May 1940, and resumed patrolling off China during 11 May – 24 June. Pope returned to Manila in late June on neutrality duty and remained on station there until 11 December 1941, when she got underway for Balikpapan, Dutch East Indies.

== World War II ==
Pope was heavily engaged in fighting in the Dutch East Indies in the early days of World War II. On 9 January 1942 Pope was one of five destroyers in an escort composed of the cruisers Boise and Marblehead, with the other destroyers Stewart, Bulmer, Parrott, and Barker departing from Darwin to Surabaya escorting the transport Bloemfontein. That transport had been part of the Pensacola Convoy and had left Brisbane 30 December 1941 with Army reinforcements composed of the 26th Field Artillery Brigade and Headquarters Battery, the 1st Battalion, 131st Field Artillery and supplies from that convoy destined for Java.

=== Battle of Balikpapan ===
On 24 January 1942, the Dutch submarine K-18 was on patrol duty when she spotted a group of five Japanese troop transports and their escorts steaming for the invasion of Balikpapan, and after sinking the transport ship Tsuruga Maru quickly alerted allied intelligence. Pope was stationed at Timor during these events, and was ordered to join the destroyers USS John D Ford, Parrot, and Paul Jones in attacking the convoy. The timing couldn't be better as K-18's attack caused the light cruiser Naka and her flotilla of destroyers to detach from the convoy and chase the submarine, leaving the troop transports largely undefended from surface warships. To maintain the element of surprise, commander Talbot aboard John D Ford ordered torpedoes as the primary weapon of his destroyers. While underway, Naka and her destroyers spotted the American ships, but after no hostilities were sited assumed they were enemy vessels. 10 minutes later, Pope and the other destroyers spotted their targets via fires caused by allied air attacks and raced to attack. The naval battle of Balikpapan began when the minesweeper W-15 spotted the American ships but assumed they were friendly vessels, and in turn American torpedoes were fired at the minesweeper - including a single torpedo from Pope - but none hit.

Pope would score the first sinking of the battle at 3:30 when she dumped five torpedoes at the group of enemy transports. Two mark 10 torpedoes hit the 3,519-ton auxiliary netlayer Sumanoura Maru to the port side, causing the ship to violently explode and sink with most of her crew and the many ground troops she carried. This paved the way for Parrot and Paul Jones to torpedo and sink the troop transport Tatsugami Maru, while John D Ford sank the troop transport Kuretake Maru. Afterwards, Pope helped to sink the last ship sunk in the battle when she joined Parrot in engaging what appeared to be an enemy destroyer. This was actually PB-37, formerly the Momi class destroyer Hishi which had been converted into a patrol boat in 1939. Parrot fired first, and one of her torpedoes hit the rear of the main gun and disabled PB-37's steering. Pope followed with her remaining torpedoes, and another torpedo hit the patrol boat forward amidships, flooding her engine and forward bulkheads, destroying her generator, and causing her to list at 7 degrees. PB-37 was towed to Balikpapan, but eventually decommissioned later that April and scuttled.

Pope’s next assignment was to screen the Dutch steamers Tjileboet and Tjitjalengka with John D Ford and Parrott on 30 January. While standing out of Soerabaja Harbor, Tjileboet broke down and stopped to make repairs. Pope and Parrott screened her while John D. Ford continued on with Tjitjalengka, and the ship was ready to proceed again that evening. On 2 February, the destroyers received orders to rendezvous with a U.S. convoy headed back to Java from Darwin, and the Dutch ships continued on unescorted. After meeting the westbound convoy and arriving at Tjilatjap on the 4th, Pope had her ammunition restocked by the destroyer tender USS Black Hawk.

=== Battle of the Badung Strait ===
Pope's next big action came in yet another attempt to halt a Japanese invasion, this time to Bali. She sailed with John D Ford and the Dutch destroyer Piet Hein, but this time supported by larger ships as they escorted the Dutch light cruisers De Ruyter and Java. In the night of 19 February, Pope was stationed near the rear of the column when at 22:30 the Japanese ships were spotted in the distance; the troop transport Sasago Maru escorted by a pair of destroyers, the Asashio and Ōshio. The cruisers opened fire while Pope stood by with the column closing the range, but over the course of 10 minutes no hits were. In stark contrast, as soon as the destroyers were within range of the enemy, gunfire from Asashio quickly crippled Piet Hien, before one of her torpedoes struck the Dutch destroyer and blew her in half with the loss of most of her crew. Immediately afterwards, Pope narrowly avoided a collision with John D Ford and fired 2 torpedoes at Asashio, then another at Ōshio, but the guns of Asashio and Ōshio quickly opened fire and straddled Pope multiple times. Under the assumption she was being engaged by enemy cruisers, Pope quickly expended all her torpedoes at Sasago Maru, and responded with her equally ineffective gunfire, and retired from the scene while John D Ford did the same. With their destroyers out of the fight, De Ruyter and Java joined Pope in retreat and secured a victory for the first stage of the battle of the Badung Strait for the Japanese.

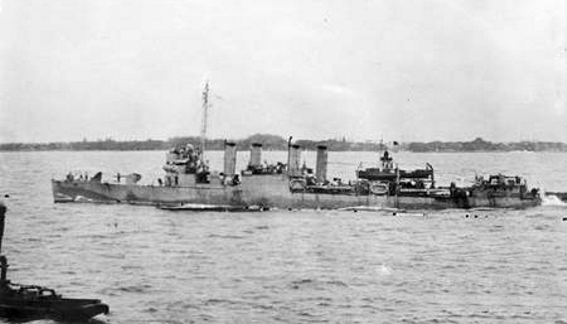
USS Pope in February 1942.

The engagement continued after Pope's retreat, but saw little success with the destroyer USS Stewart crippled by gunfire from Asashio and Ōshio and later scuttled while failing to stop the Japanese convoy. In the meantime, as Pope retreated her crew watched Asashio and Ōshio mistakenly opened fire on each other, although they failed to damage each other. Pope returned to Tjilatjap on the 21st and refueled from the fleet oilier USS Pecos, then ferried royal air force personnel to Christmas Island where she had her torpedoes reloaded by the Black Hawk. Pope then returned to Soerabaja to rendezvous with the allied fleet in preparation to halt the Japanese invasion of Java. However, Pope ultimately developed a leaking hot well which prevented her from taking part in what became the battle of the Java Sea. This became a blessing in disguise as the final stand of ABDA fleet turned into a devastating Japanese victory which saw two light cruisers and three destroyers sunk without a Japanese loss.

=== Fate / Wreck ===
During the battle, the heavy cruiser HMS Exeter had been crippled by a shell hit from the heavy cruiser Haguro which destroyed six of her eight boilers, and the escorting Dutch destroyer Witte De With was damaged by an air raid and had to return to Surabaya, and the patched up Pope was ordered to replace her. In the evening of 28 February 1942, Exeter with Pope and the destroyer HMS Encounter left Soerabaja and proceeded north. Japanese surface and air forces launched an attack the next morning, midway between the islands of Java and Borneo. As they sought to escape, at 9:15 the three Allied ships ran into Exeter's former opponent Haguro and her surrounding ships, and altered their course to avoid an engagement. However, their stealth did not last as a Japanese floatplane spotted the allied ships, followed with the arrival of the heavy cruisers Myōkō and Ashigara and the destroyers Inazuma and Akebono just before noon. Pope opened fire at Inazuma and Akebono at 12,000 yards while laying a smokescreen to cover the limping Exeter. Encounter followed Pope's footsteps as gunfire from the Japanese destroyers splashed around Pope, which in turn unleashed a pair of torpedoes at the enemy ships. The battle continued as a stalemate for about an hour with no hits scored on either side, until 12:50 with the arrival of Haguro, the heavy cruiser Nachi, and destroyers Yamakaze and Kawakaze, and within 5 minutes Exeter was disabled by a hit to the boiler room and was scuttled after a flurry of following hits. Myōkō, Ashigara, Kawakaze, and Yamakaze then turned their guns on Encounter which sank in a 40-minute blaze of glory.

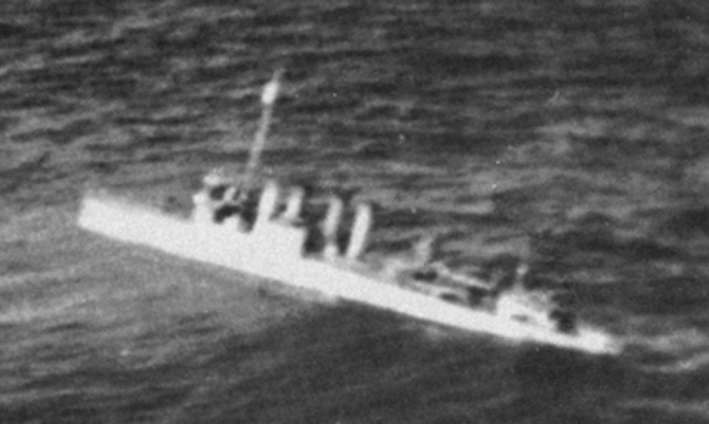
A photo believed to be USS Pope sinking, probably taken from the floatplane of the heavy cruiser Myōkō

In the meantime, Pope found temporary refuge in a rain squall. After firing off 140 salvos and all her torpedoes, the shockwave damage knocked out her number 3 boiler. Although the Japanese cruisers were evaded by a course change within the squall, Pope was rediscovered by aircraft from the Japanese light carrier Ryūjō after she emerged from the squall. After the destroyer's single 3-inch anti-aircraft gun failed, one of six dive-bombers scored a near miss which wrecked the port engine shaft and started flooding from damaged hull plating. Flooding worsened as Pope maneuvered to evade six more bombers, and only one crewman was lost as the crew boarded life rafts when flooding could no longer be controlled. Pope remained afloat long enough to be sunk about 2pm, when Myōkō and Ashigara found the crippled Pope and sent her to the bottom by the 6th salvo from their 8-inch (203 mm) guns.

This was to be the start of a long, almost 60 hour ordeal for the men in the water, as the survivors from Pope would not be rescued until almost midnight on 3 March by the Japanese destroyer Inazuma. The survivors from Encounter and Exeter were to be more fortunate, as those that were not rescued right after the battle on 1 March by the destroyer Inazuma, were rescued the following day by the Japanese destroyer Ikazuchi, who picked up the last 400 odd survivors from those two ships on 2 March. These survivors had been adrift for about 22 hours in rafts and life jackets, or clinging to floats, many coated in oil, and some blinded. This humanitarian decision by Lieutenant Commander Shunsaku Kudō placed Ikazuchi at risk of attack, and it interfered with her fighting ability, due to the sheer load of rescued sailors. The action was later the subject of several books and articles and a 2007 TV programme.

Pope was struck from the Naval Vessel Register on 8 May 1942. She received two battle stars and the Presidential Unit Citation for her World War II service. The wreck of USS Pope was located and identified in December 2008 by the dive vessel MV Empress, approximately 60 nautical miles (110 km) from the wreck of HMS Exeter, which Empress discovered in 2007. Unfortunately commercial salvage divers had discovered Pope previously and save for a skeleton, little now remains of her wreck. With her location/identification now being finally confirmed, all ships lost during the Battle of the Java Sea and subsequent engagements have now been discovered/located and positively identified.

== See also ==
- Richard Antrim, executive officer of the USS Pope, Medal of Honor recipient.
