= USS Water Witch (1851) =

US Navy gunboat

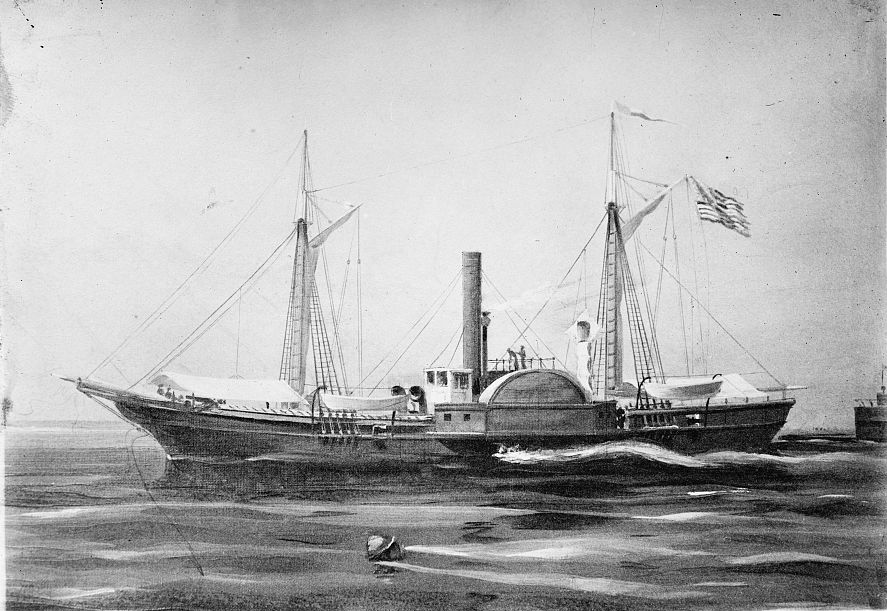
- USS Water Witch

History

United States
- Name: USS/CSS Water Witch
- Laid down: 1851
- Commissioned: 1853
- Fate: Captured by CSN 3 June 1864; Burned to prevent recapture, 19 December 1864

General characteristics
- Displacement: 464 tons
- Length: 163 ft (50 m)
- Beam: 24 ft 4 in (7.42 m)
- Draft: 11 ft 9 in (3.58 m)
- Propulsion: steam
- Complement: 64 officers and enlisted
- Armament: 4 32-pdrs., 1 12-pdr.sb., 1 20-pdr. P.r., 4 32-pdrs.

The third USS Water Witch was a wooden-hulled, sidewheel gunboat in the United States Navy during the American Civil War. She is best known as the ship fired on by Paraguay in 1855. In 1864 she was captured by the Confederate States Navy, and subsequently was taken into that Navy as CSS Water Witch.

== Commissioning and early service ==
Water Witch was launched by the Washington Navy Yard in 1851 and was commissioned during the winter of 1852–53, Lieutenant Thomas Jefferson Page in command.

On 8 February 1853, the gunboat set sail from Norfolk, Virginia, for an extended exploration and survey voyage along the Atlantic coast of the southern portion of South America and of the rivers which drain that part of the continent. Over the next few years, she conducted surveys of the rivers in Paraguay, Argentina, and Uruguay. In February 1855, while the little steamer was surveying the Río de la Plata basin, she was fired upon by the Paraguayan Fort Itapirú. The bombardment killed one member of her crew (helmsman Samuel Chaney) and ended her surveying mission on the river. The gunboat, however, continued her mission in other areas of the southeastern coast of South America until 1856. On 8 May 1856, she returned to the Washington Navy Yard for repairs and went out of commission on the 12th.

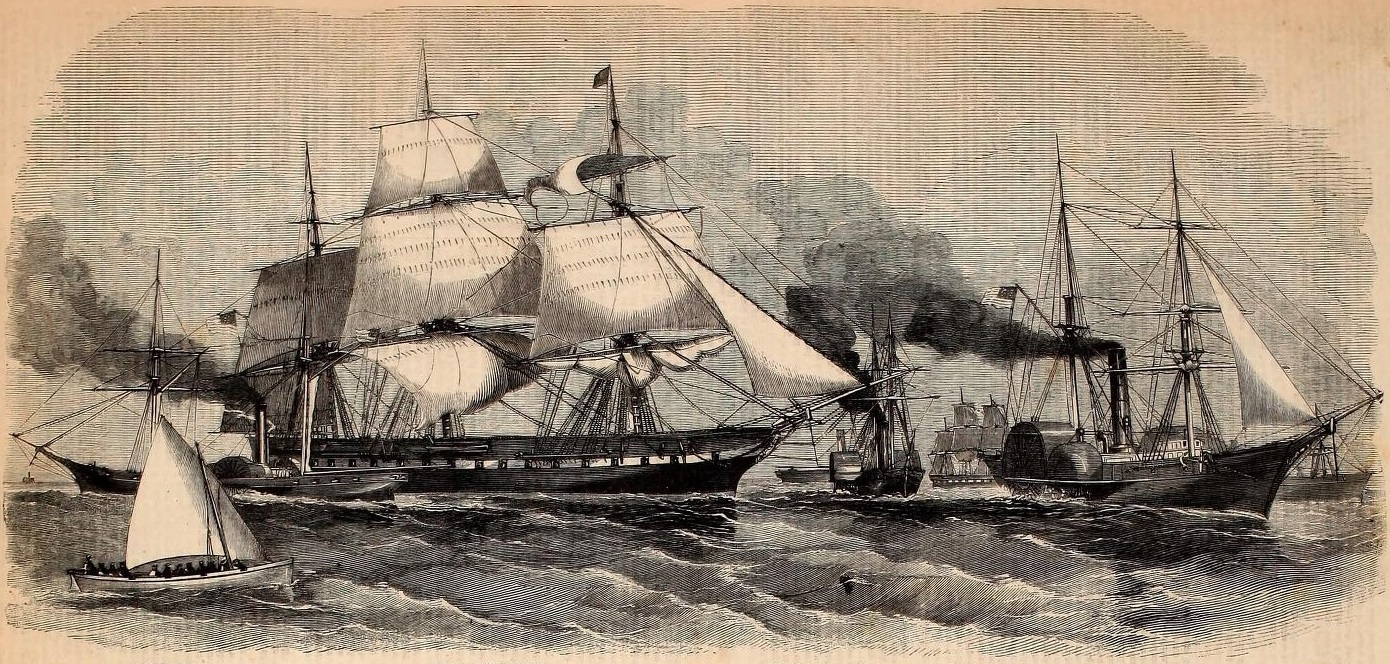
The Paraguay Squadron (Harper's Weekly, New York, 16 October 1858).

The ship recommissioned briefly during the summer of 1858, but her next real active service came after yet another recommissioning on 17 September of that same year. She headed for the coast of South America as part of the Paraguay expedition under Flag Officer William B. Shubrick to exact an apology and an indemnity from Paraguay over the incident which had occurred in 1855. In January 1859, Water Witch and Fulton arrived in Asunción, the capital of Paraguay; and, backed by the warships, an American commissioner, James B. Bowlin, began negotiations with the Paraguayans. As a result of that expedition, Paraguay extended a satisfactory apology to the United States, indemnified the family of the slain Water Witch crewman, and granted the United States a new and highly advantageous commercial treaty.

After the resolution of the difficulties with Paraguay, Water Witch resumed her survey missions in that region of the world. That employment, punctuated by periods out of commission in the United States, lasted until the fall preceding the outbreak of the Civil War. She was again decommissioned, this time at the Philadelphia Navy Yard, for repairs on 1 November 1860.

== Civil War ==
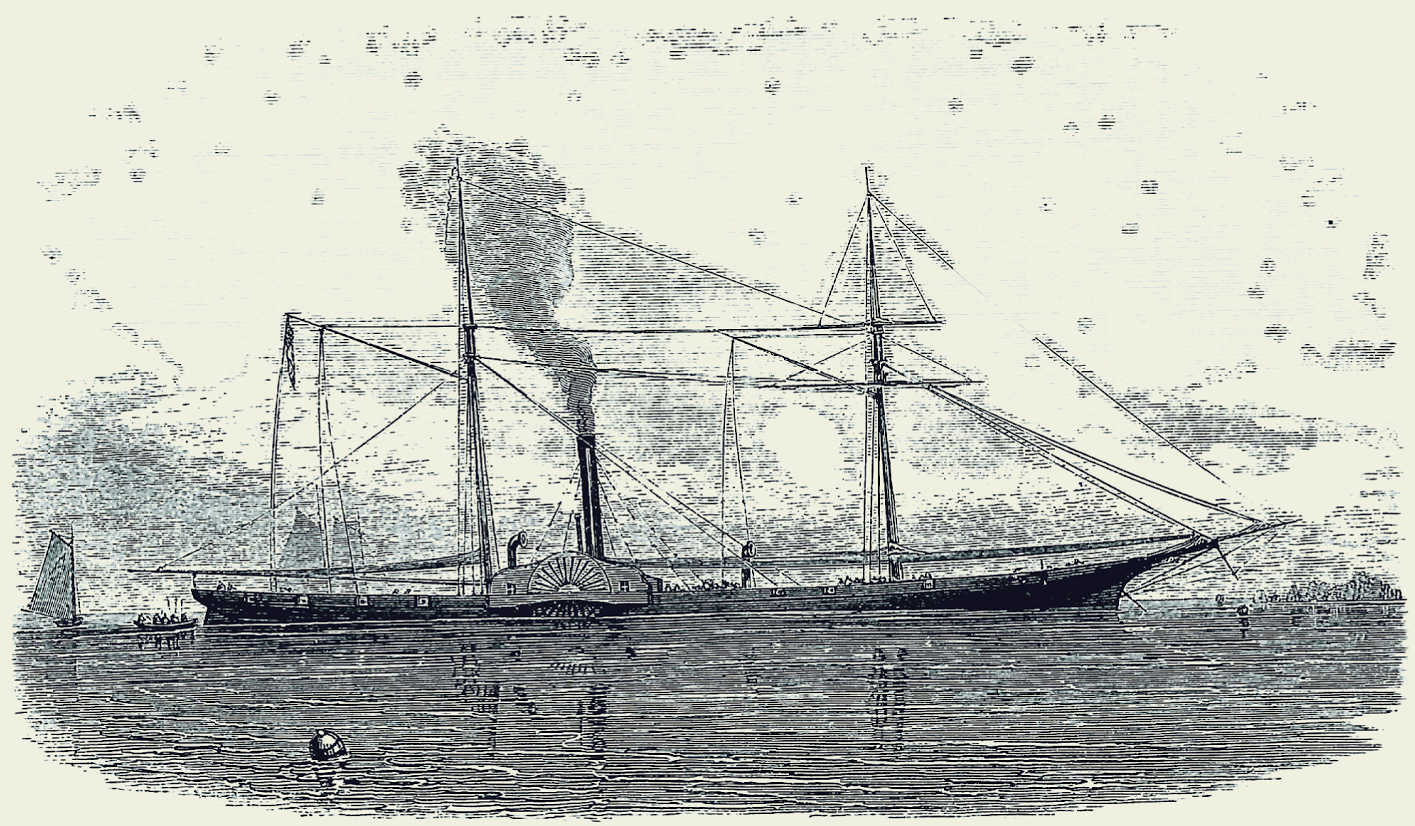
The Water Witch.

She returned to active duty on 10 April 1861, just two days before General Beauregard's bombardment of Fort Sumter opened hostilities between the North and the South. Steaming via Key West, Florida, she joined the Gulf Blockading Squadron off Pensacola, Florida, on 2 May. There, her initial duty consisted of dispatch service and shuttling mail between the blockaders and their base at Key West. She also carried mail to Havana, Cuba.

However, later that summer, her duty station was changed to the area around the mouth of the Mississippi River. That duty lasted until the beginning of 1862. During the intervening months, she made several reconnaissance runs into the mouth of the Mississippi, missions made possible by her shallow draft. During one such incursion, ships of the Federal Fleet were attacked by the Confederate ram Manassas and the converted gunboat Ivy. Water Witch engaged Ivy briefly but never encountered the ram which zeroed in on and damaged Richmond. The Union ships re-crossed the bar; and the Confederates retired upriver, Manassas having suffered damage to her ram.

On 20 January 1862, the Gulf Blockading Squadron was divided in two to create the West Gulf Blockading Squadron and the East Gulf Blockading Squadron. Water Witch was assigned to the latter organization, and her area of operations became the gulf coasts of Alabama and Florida. She served most frequently off Mobile, Alabama and Pensacola, but also performed the familiar duty of dispatch vessel and mail packet. On 5 March 1862, the gunboat pursued the Confederate schooner, William Mallory, for five hours before finally capturing the blockade runner late in the day. In April, she began another period of repairs that lasted until September. On 6 September, she was recommissioned and ordered to join Rear Admiral Samuel F. du Pont's South Atlantic Blockading Squadron. She arrived at Port Royal, South Carolina, on 18 September and, by the end of the month, was on blockade station in the St. Johns River in northeastern Florida.

On 1 October, Water Witch, USS Cimarron, and USS Uncas moved up the river as far as St. John's Bluff to reconnoiter Confederate batteries situated on the heights. They traded some shots with the heavy caliber battery but soon retired because of well-directed fire from the Southerners. The following day, Federal troops landed and moved inland to isolate the Confederates manning the batteries on the bluff. Thereupon, the Southerners abandoned their guns in haste, and Water Witch participated in the unopposed occupation of the former Confederate positions late on the 3rd. Over the next few days, the warship participated in a foray farther up the river to destroy shipping and river barges.

On 17 October, she returned to Port Royal to resume her role as a dispatch vessel again. She continued to serve with the South Atlantic Blockading Squadron until February 1863 when she broke down and had to be towed north for repairs.

She completed repairs late that spring and returned to Port Royal on 14 June. She performed blockade duty at several points along the coasts of South Carolina, Georgia, and northern Florida, but most frequently at Ossabaw Sound between Ossabaw Island and the Georgia mainland about 15 miles due south of Savannah, Georgia. That remained her primary duty station well into 1864. On the night of 3 June of that year, a Confederate Marine boat force under the command of First Lieutenant Thomas P. Pelot, CSN, succeeded in boarding and capturing Water Witch in Ossabaw Sound after a brief scuffle which cost the Union ship two killed and 12 wounded. (13 officers and 49 men were captured). Confederate losses were 6 killed and 17 wounded. African-Americans were killed on both sides, Confederate river pilot Moses Dallas and Union landsman Jeremiah Sills. The only Union man to escape was a "contraband" named Peter McIntosh.

The prize was subsequently taken into the Confederate Navy in which she retained the name Water Witch. Lt. W. W. Carnes, CSN, commanded the ship during her service for the South. Plans were being made to move her to Savannah for some special assignment, but she remained at White Bluff, Georgia, until 19 December 1864 when the Confederates burned her to prevent recapture. Carnes was later ordered to Columbus, Georgia to take command of the CSS Jackson.

== Reproduction ==
In 2009, the National Civil War Naval Museum completed construction of a full-scale reproduction of the USS Water Witch using her original plan drawings at their facilities in Columbus, Georgia. The museum is also home to the Water Witch's original bell, one of her flags, and an original Bible taken from the ship. The museum's Water Witch recreation and exhibit was on display for visitors until October 2019, by which time the reproduction had deteriorated from weathering and was demolished.

== See also ==
- Blockade runners of the American Civil War
- Blockade mail of the Confederacy
- Union Navy
- List of United States Navy ships
- List of ships captured in American Civil War
