= CSS Ivy =

Steamboat

Coordinates: 32.710710°N 90.518516°W

History

Confederate States
- Name: Ivy
- Namesake: V.H. Ivy
- Owner: Confederate States Navy
- Builder: Burtis
- Launched: 1845
- Commissioned: May 16, 1861
- Fate: Destroyed to prevent capture at Liverpool Landing, Yazoo River, May 1863

General characteristics
- Tons burthen: 447 tons
- Length: 191 ft (58 m)
- Beam: 28 ft (8.5 m)
- Draft: 9 ft (2.7 m)
- Propulsion: Side paddle wheels, one vertical condensing beam engine; cylinders, 44” diameter, 11’ stroke
- Speed: 12 knots (22 km/h; 14 mph)
- Complement: 60 officers and men
- Armament: 1 8”-smoothbore, 1 32-pounder rifle

CSS Ivy was a sidewheel steamer and privateer purchased by Commodore Lawrence Rousseau for service with the Confederate States Navy, and chosen by Commodore George Hollins for his Mosquito Fleet. The Mosquito Fleet was a group of riverboats converted to gunboats, and used to defend the Mississippi River in the area of New Orleans during the American Civil War.

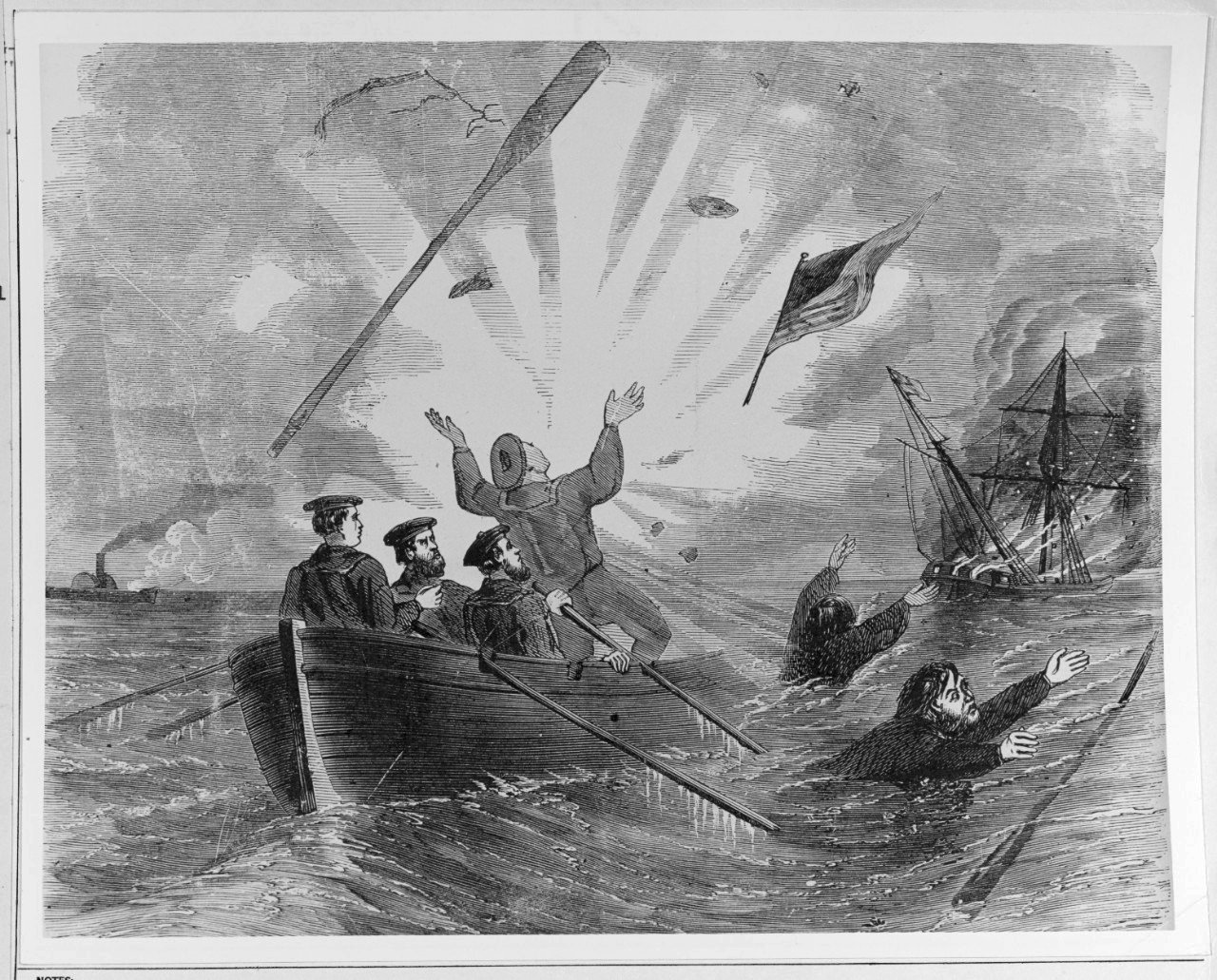
CSS Ivy and USS Niagara.

Equipped with a powerful rifled 32-pounder, Ivy fought with the Mosquito Fleet at the Confederate victory of the Battle of the Head of Passes and their defeat at the Battle of Island Number 10. Subsequently, trapped in the Yazoo River, Ivy was destroyed to prevent her capture by the Union in May 1863.

== Description ==
Ivy was 191 feet (58.2 m) long overall, had a beam of 28 feet (8.5 m) and a draft of 9 feet (2.7 m). Her two side paddle wheels were powered by a large, sophisticated walking beam engine and multiple boiler propulsion system with 44 inches (112 cm) diameter cylinders on an 11 foot (3.4 m) stroke, giving a maximum speed of 12 knots (22 km/h; 14 mph). She had a complement of 60 officers and men.

As a privateer Ivy was armed with two brass 24-pounder smoothbore howitzers. As a riverboat her armament was increased to an eight-inch smoothbore mounted aft, and a 32-pounder rifled gun mounted on a forward pivot position on the bow. The conventional description of "rifled 32-pounder" is misleading, however. This gun was a former 32-pounder smoothbore that had been "modernized" by rifling the barrel, and machining and shrinking a single layer of red hot bands of wrought iron onto the breech of the barrel to allow it to operate at much greater breech pressures. This rifling and banding allowed the gun to fire a 100-pound (6.4-inch diameter) conical shot or shell at much greater ranges than would be possible with a 32-pound round shot fired out of a smoothbore barrel. This modification was similar to the James rifle process used to produce siege guns, and the resulting gun tube resembled a Parrott rifle. This gun could be much more accurately described as a 6.4 inches (16 cm) banded rifle, and was the most powerful long range weapon in the mosquito fleet.

== Privateer ==
As a privately owned commercial vessel, Ivy had been known as Roger Williams and El-Paraguay. CSS Ivy began her Civil War career as a New Orleans-based privateer V.H. Ivy, sent out to capture Union commercial vessels once Jefferson Davis authorized the distribution of letters of marque and reprisal to private citizens after hostilities began in April 1861. Ivy did well at this, capturing four northern registered vessels. One of these was the icebreaker Enoch Train, which was purchased by private investors and rebuilt as the privateer ironclad ram Manassas. This vessel in turn was commandeered by Commodore Hollins as CSS Manassas.

== Mosquito fleet ==
=== Blockade of the Mississippi ===
The Union Blockade arrived at the mouth of the Mississippi on May 27, 1861, when USS Brooklyn took up position. This event energized defense efforts in New Orleans and led to the replacement of Rousseau with Commodore Hollins in July 1861 to command the river defense. By August, Hollins had established his mosquito fleet for defense of the river in the area of New Orleans. The fleet consisted of CSS McRae, the flagship CSS Tuscarora, CSS Livingston, CSS Calhoun, CSS Jackson, and Ivy. Ivy was the fastest ship of the fleet and so was made the reconnaissance vessel, with increased firepower.

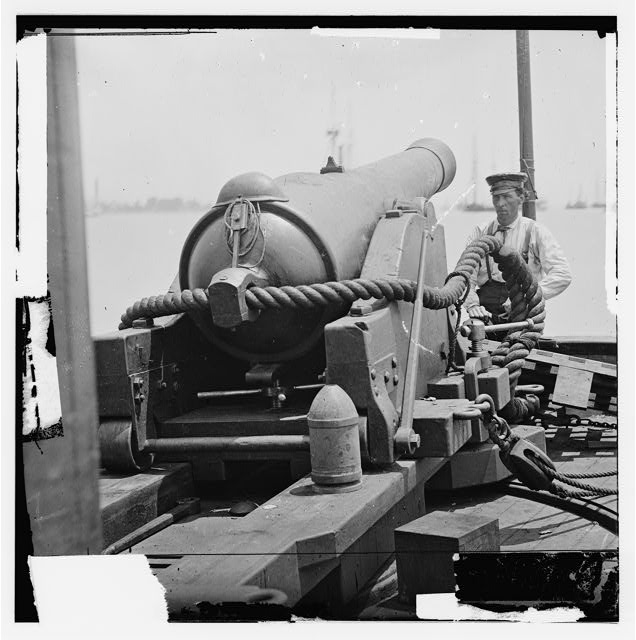
6.4-inch banded rifle, the weapon type used as the bow pivot gun on CSS Ivy. Note the 100-pound conical projectile at the right rear of the gun carriage. This image is from the Library of Congress.

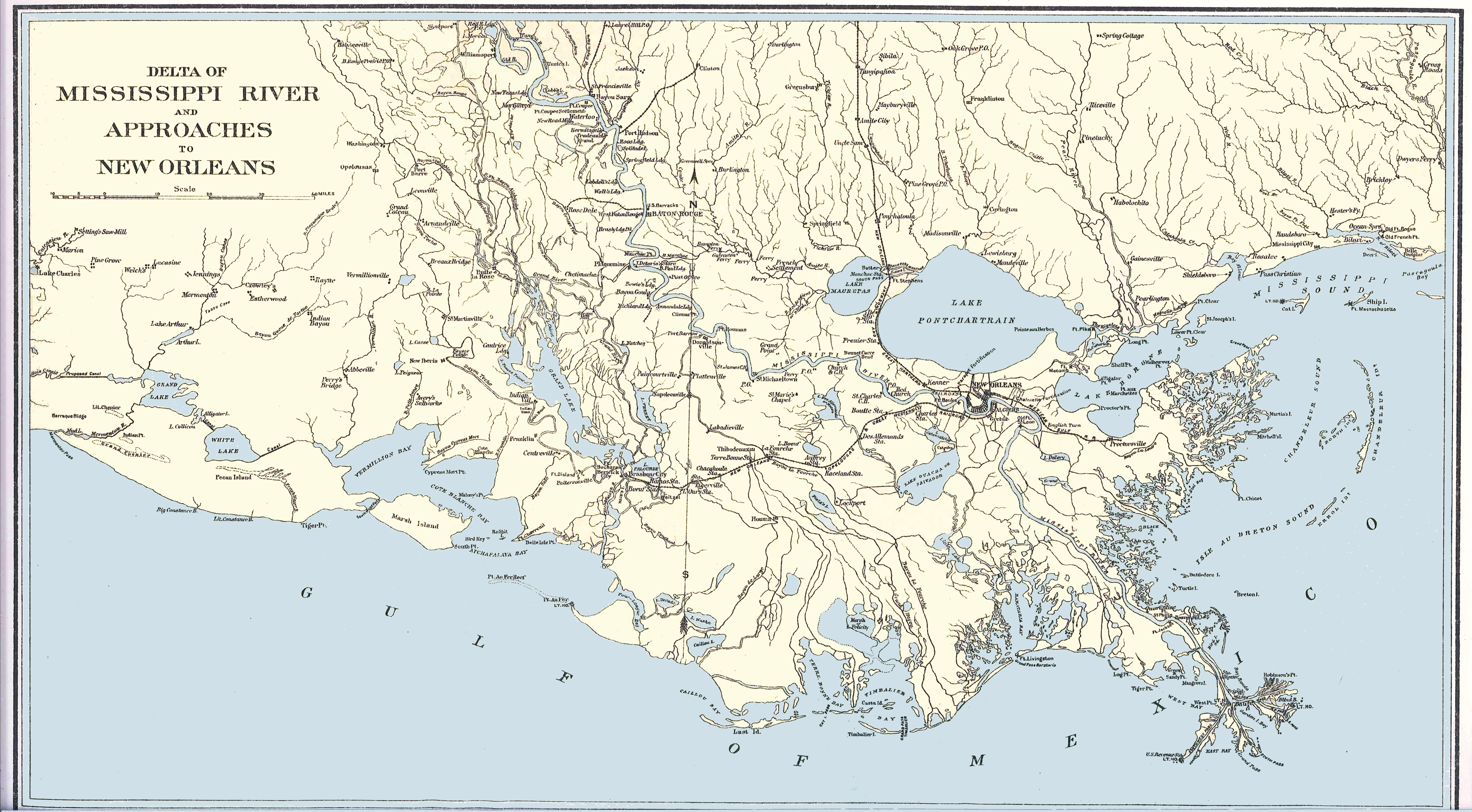
Map of Louisiana during the Civil War. CSS Ivy was based in New Orleans and helped defend the lower Mississippi.

=== Battle of the Head of Passes ===
Ivy began patrolling the Mississippi River south of Forts Jackson and St. Phillip beginning in September 1861, captained by Lieutenant Fry of the CSN. On September 19 she encountered USS Water Witch. Water Witch was scouting the Head of Passes for the blockade fleet, which was planning to occupy the Head of Passes and set up a shore battery to control this strategic point. On October 5 Ivy reported the Head of Passes occupied by three vessels of the Union fleet, and shelled them with her bow pivot gun. Returning to the forts, Fry warned Hollins that the Union fleet was establishing a base at the Head of Passes. Hollins decided that the advance of the Blockade Fleet was a significant threat to New Orleans and moved to attack with the entire mosquito fleet. This attack resulted in the Battle of the Head of Passes, a Confederate victory which routed the Blockade Fleet and sent it back to the mouth of the Southwest Passage.

=== Battle of Island Number 10 ===
This victory reinforced the idea in the Confederate War Department that Flag Officer Foote's Union Mississippi River Squadron at the north end of the Mississippi was the greatest threat to the Confederacy. The Battle of Fort Henry, the Battle of Fort Donelson, and the Battle of Shiloh lent a lot of credibility to this idea. As a result, the mosquito fleet and Ivy were ordered to the upper Mississippi and took part in the Battle of Island Number 10. Island Number 10 was a defeat for the Confederate forces involved. The mosquito fleet could not match USS Pittsburgh and Carondelet after these ships successfully ran the Confederate batteries, and it was forced to retreat.

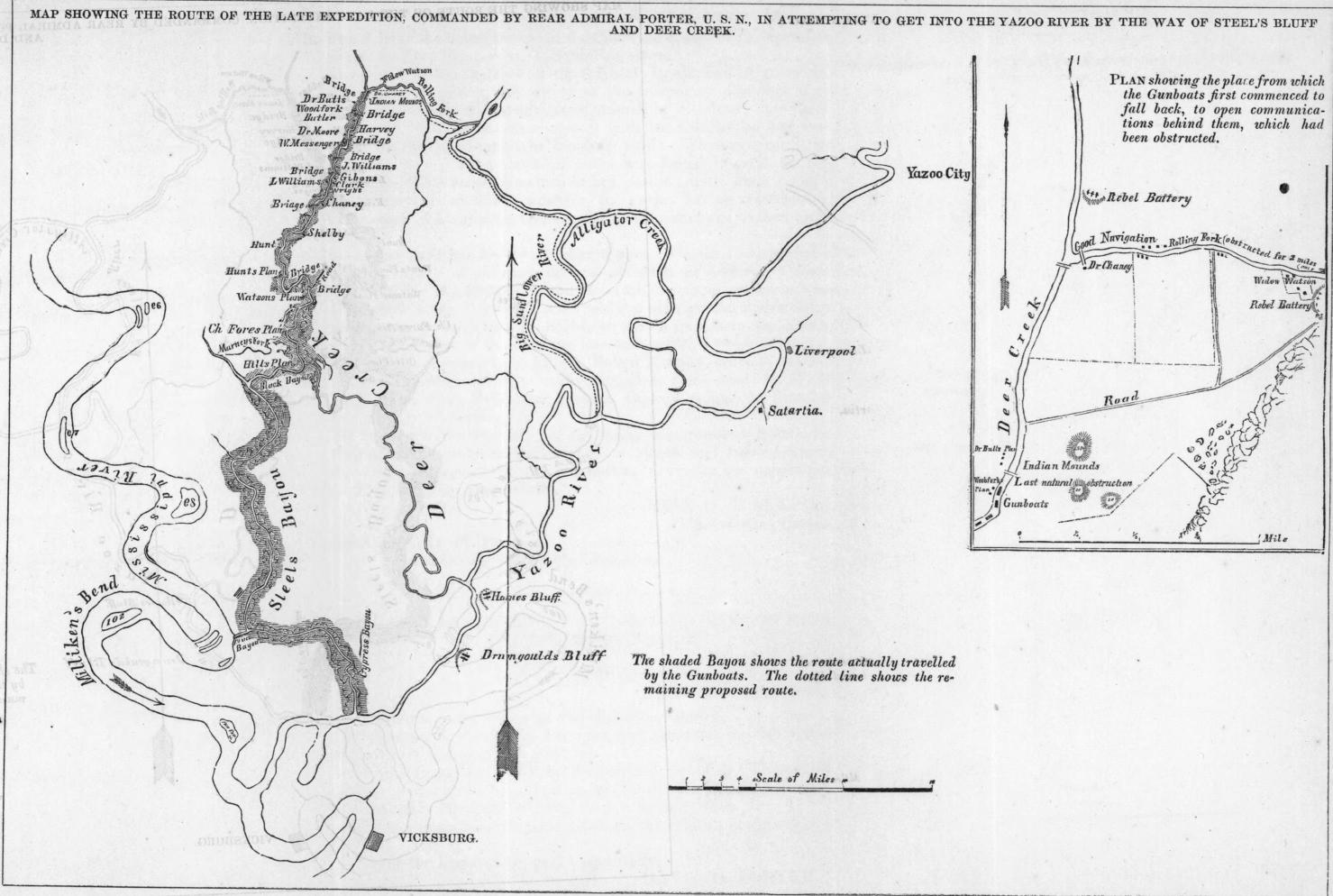
Porter's Yazoo River expedition against the last Confederate Naval base in western waters at Yazoo City. This image is from the Library of Congress.

=== Destruction ===
Commander McBlair CSN at Memphis, being informed that New Orleans had fallen after the Battle of Forts Jackson and St. Philip, ordered the remaining Confederate vessels on the Mississippi to concentrate at Yazoo City, Mississippi, on the Yazoo River. He regarded this harbor as the only safe place remaining on the Mississippi River network for the Confederate Navy to maintain a base.

This remaining refuge did not prove safe for long. In May 1863, Rear Admiral David Dixon Porter ordered a fleet under the command of Lieutenant-commander Walker to destroy Confederate commerce on the Yazoo River. This force consisted of USS Baron De Kalb, Forest Rose, Linden, Signal, and Petrel. With Forest Rose acting as a minesweeper, this force advanced steadily up the Yazoo River, from May 24–31. Fearing the capture of their vessels on the Yazoo, Confederate forces destroyed CSS Ivy, Star of the West, and the transports Arcadia and Magenta.
