= Head of Passes =

Mouth of the main stem of the Mississippi River

Coordinates: 29.157°N 89.254°W

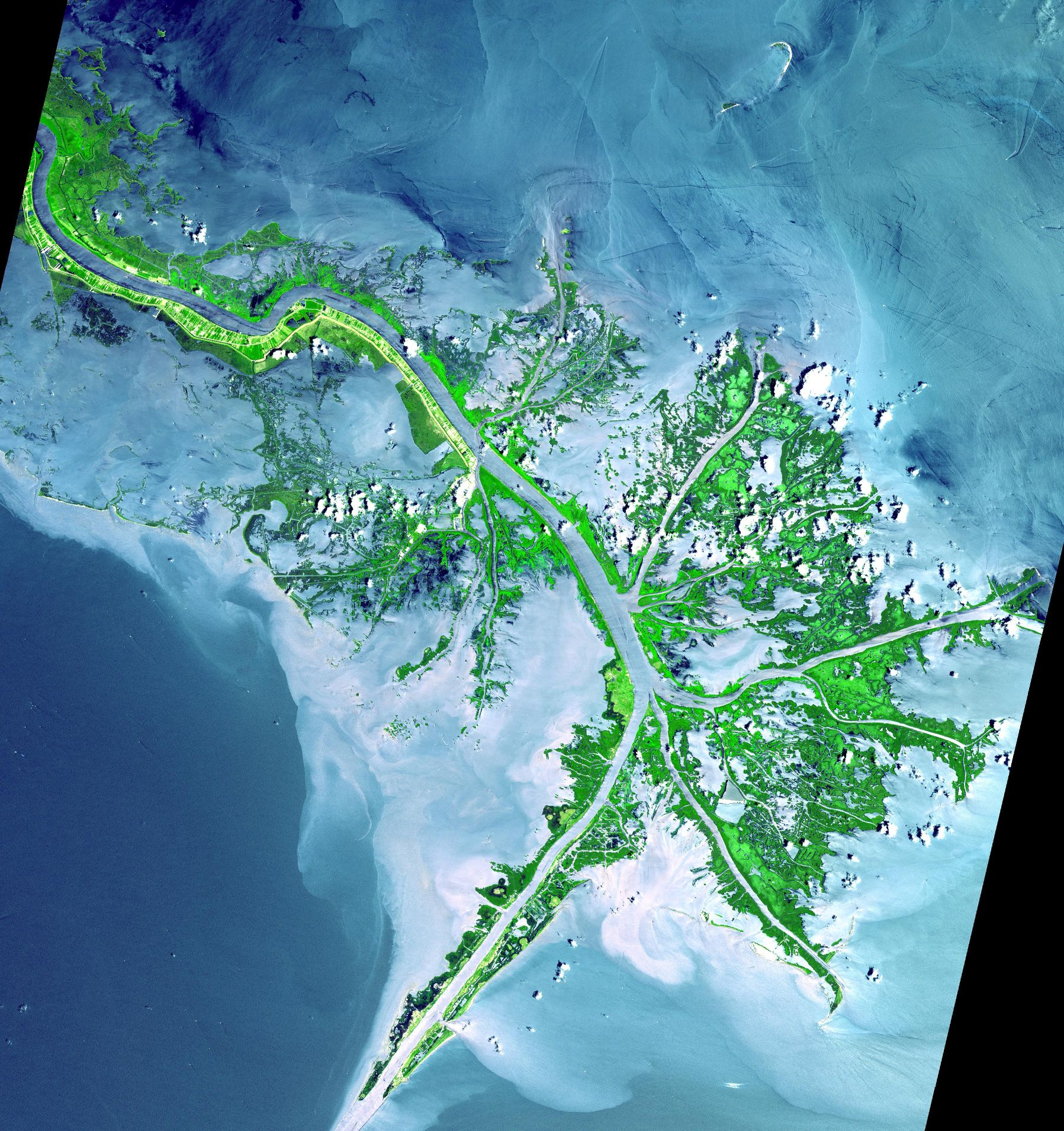
The "Bird's Foot Delta"

Head of Passes is where the main stem of the Mississippi River branches off into three distinct directions at its mouth in the Gulf of Mexico: Southwest Pass (west), Pass A Loutre (east) and South Pass (centre). They are part of the "Bird's Foot Delta", the youngest lobe of the evolving Mississippi River Delta.

The Head of Passes is considered to be the location of the mouth of the Mississippi River.

The US Army Corps of Engineers maintains a 45-foot (13.7 m) shipping channel from the mouth of Southwest Pass—20 miles (32 km) downriver from the Head—up to Baton Rouge, the US's farthest inland deep-water port.

The Mouth of Passes is the aggregate of the individual mouths of the passes connected to the Head of Passes, including the Southwest, South, North Passes and Pass a Loutre. While the majority of the discharge of the Mississippi River flows through these mouths, a portion of the river flows out of the Atchafalaya River mouth, and a small portion continues to seep out of the 200 miles (300 km) of the Delta shoreline.

During the American Civil War, Head of Passes was the site of several naval battles. The Anaconda Plan called for a large Union blockade of the Confederacy, and included plans to control the Mississippi River. This began in 1861 with a Union blockade stationed at the Head of Passes. This occupation resulted in the Battle of the Head of Passes, where the blockading forces were temporarily driven from the area. Ships involved in the ensuing conflict at the location include the CSS Manassas, the USS Vincennes, and the USS Richmond.

Port Eads is located at the southern tip of South Pass.

== AHP datum ==
The Head of Passes is the datum from which mileages on the Lower Mississippi River are measured. Algiers Point, for instance, is at mile 94.6 AHP (above Head of Passes). Cairo, Illinois, is at mile 953.8 AHP. Mileages downstream from Head of Passes are labelled BHP (below Head of Passes).
