= CSS Manassas =

First Confederate ironclad warship

Coordinates: 29°21′35″N 89°27′07″W

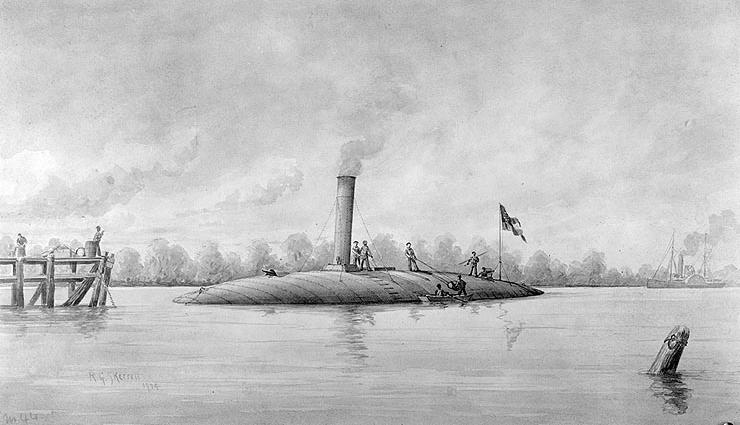
- CSS Manassas

History

Confederate States of America
- Name: Manassas; originally Enoch Train
- Namesake: Battle of First Manassas; Enoch Train
- Owner: Boston Steam Tow-Boat Co.
- Builder: James. O. Curtis, Medford, Massachusetts
- Launched: 1853 or 1855
- Commissioned: September 12, 1861
- Decommissioned: April 24, 1862
- Fate: Sunk in battle April 24, 1862

General characteristics
- Class & type: Steam tug, Ironclad
- Displacement: 387 tons
- Tons burthen: 384 1/2 tons
- Length: 143 ft (44 m)
- Beam: 33 ft (10 m)
- Draft: 17 ft (5.2 m)
- Propulsion: Steam engine
- Complement: 36 officers and men
- Armament: One 64-pounder Dahlgren, later replaced by one 32-pounder

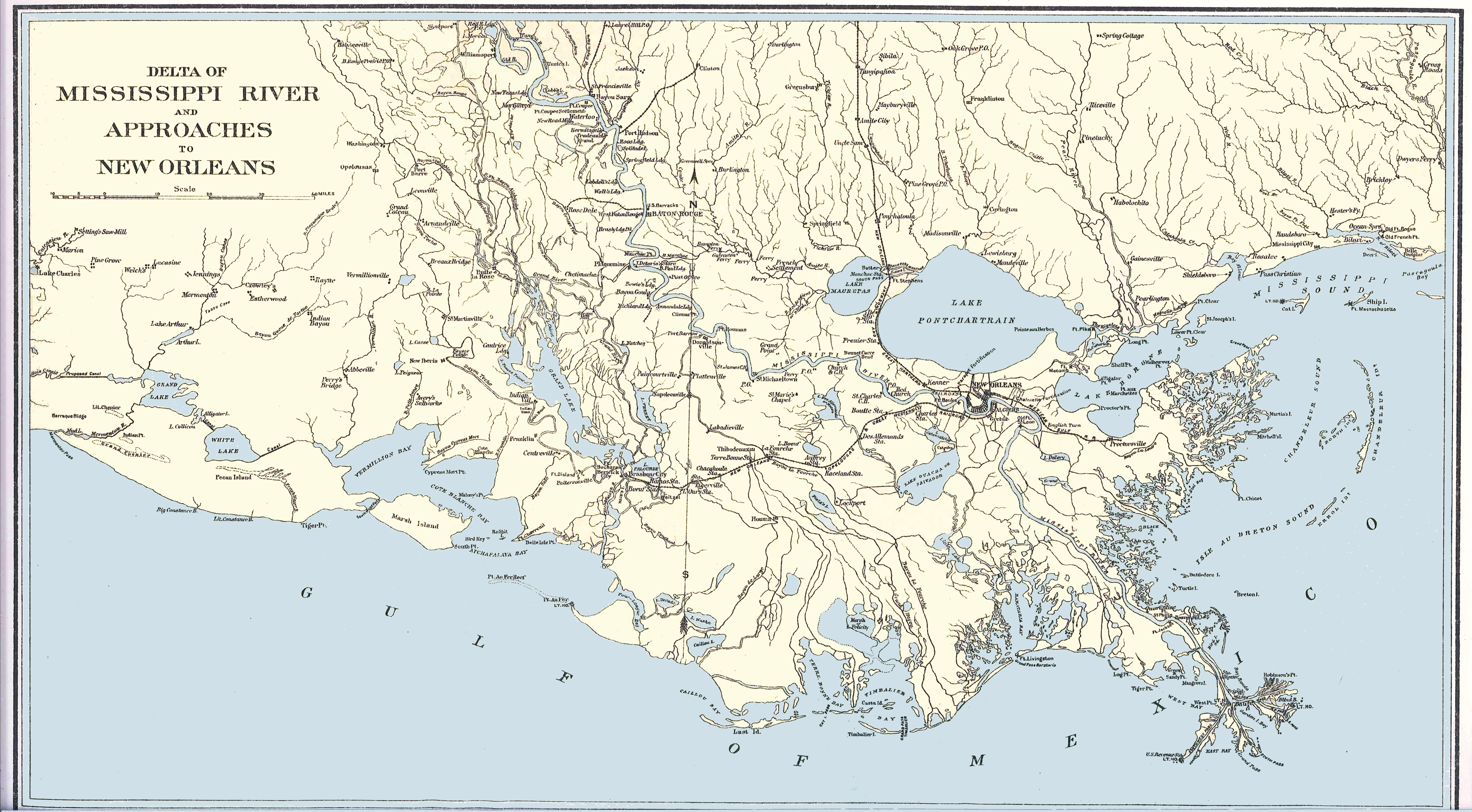
Map of Louisiana during the Civil War. CSS Manassas was based in New Orleans and helped defend the lower Mississippi.

CSS Manassas, formerly the steam icebreaker Enoch Train, was built in 1855 by James O. Curtis as a twin-screw towboat at Medford, Massachusetts. A New Orleans commission merchant, Captain John A. Stevenson, acquired her for use as a privateer after she was captured by another privateer (later gunboat) CSS Ivy. Her fitting out as Manassas was completed at Algiers, Louisiana; her conversion to a ram of a radically modern design made her the first ironclad ship built for the Confederacy.

== Description ==
Covered with 1.25-inch (32 mm) iron plating, her above-water hull was reshaped into a curved "turtle-back" form; at its lowest when fully loaded, the hull projected only 6 1/2 feet above the waterline, not counting her smokestacks (surviving accounts and period illustrations vary showing Manassas was equipped with either a single or two side-by-side smokestacks, possibly slanted back at a rakish angle). The convex shape of her iron-plated topside was intended to cause cannon shot to glance off harmlessly. She was 128 feet (39 m) in length, overall, and had a 26-foot (7.9 m) hull beam and 11-foot (3.4 m) draught. Her bow was fitted with a pointed iron ram to stave holes in Union vessels, and she also carried a forward-firing cannon behind a single gun port with an armored shutter. Her low profile made her a difficult target, while her curved armor plating protected her against all but the most well-directed Union cannon fire. Lying low in the water, she looked like a floating cigar or egg and was described by Union intelligence as a "hellish machine."

== Service history ==
Commissioned as a Confederate privateer on 12 September 1861, Manassas was seized soon afterwards by Flag Officer George N. Hollins, CSN, for use in the lower Mississippi River. With Lieutenant Alexander F. Warley, CSN, in command, she participated in Flag Officer Hollins' surprise attack on the Federal blockading squadron at Head of Passes on 12 October 1861, the action being known as the Battle of the Head of Passes. In the action Manassas rammed USS Richmond, but the impact was partly absorbed by a coal barge tied alongside. Manassas, however, suffered the loss of her iron prow and smokestack(s) and had one of her two engines unseated from its mounts, temporarily putting it out of commission. She managed to retire under heavy fire from USS Preble and Richmond, whose shells glanced off her armor. Two months after this engagement, Manassas was purchased for direct ownership and re-commissioned in the CSN by the Confederate Government.

Under Lieutenant Warley, CSS Manassas joined the force of Captain John K. Mitchell, CSN, commanding Confederate naval forces in the lower Mississippi. She participated in the Battle of Forts Jackson and St. Philip, during which Commodore David Farragut, USN, on his way to New Orleans, ran his fleet past the Confederate forts of Fort Jackson and Fort St. Philip. In the action Manassas attempted to ram USS Pensacola, which turned in time to avoid the heavy blow and delivered a full broadside at close range. Manassas then ran into more murderous fire from the whole line of the Union fleet. She then charged USS Mississippi and delivered a long glancing blow to her hull, also firing her single cannon as she rammed. Next she rammed USS Brooklyn, again firing her cannon, injuring her deeply, but not fatally.

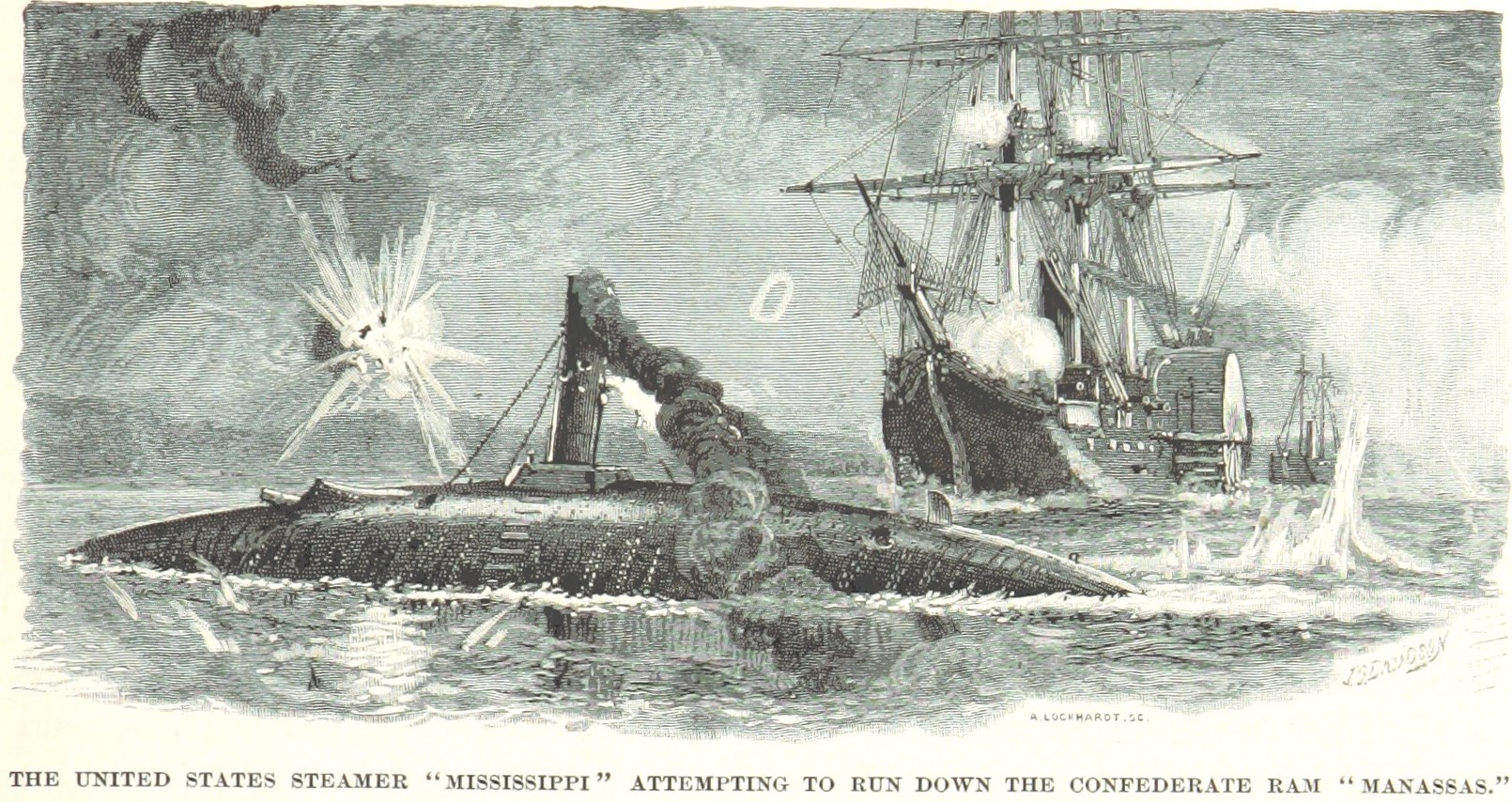
Mississippi attempts to ram Manassas

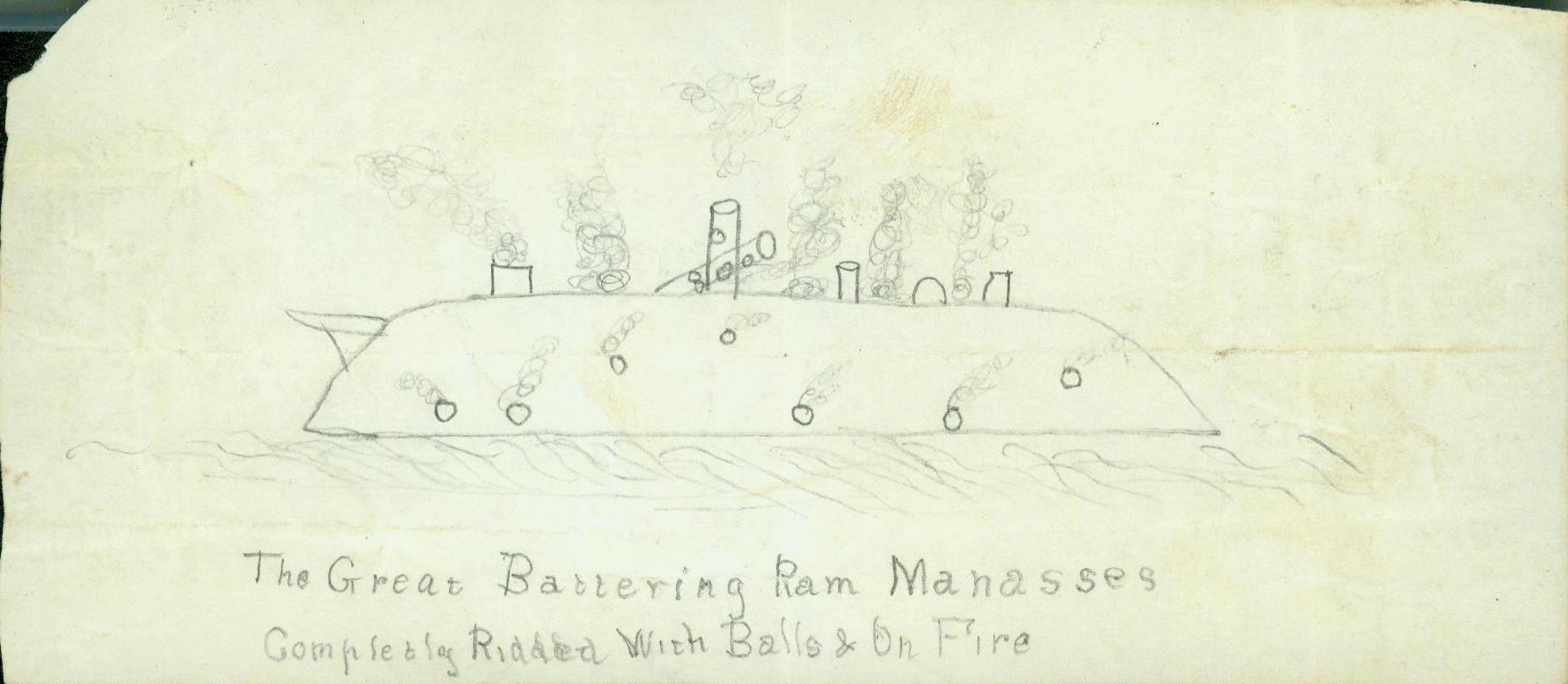
A sketch showing "The Great Battering Ram Manassas Completely Riddled with Balls and on Fire"

After this action Manassas followed the Union fleet quietly for a while, but as she drew closer Mississippi furiously turned on her and made an attempt to ram the ironclad. Manassas managed to dodge the blow but ran aground in the process. Her crew managed to escape as Mississippi poured heavy broadsides into the stranded Confederate ram. Now on fire, Manassas slipped off the bank and drifted down the river past the Union mortar flotilla. Commander David Dixon Porter, USN, in command of the mortar boats, tried to save her as an engineering curiosity, but Manassas exploded and immediately plunged under water, a total loss. In 1981, the National Underwater and Marine Agency located the suspected wreckage of the Manassas under a current levee on the bank of the Mississippi.

Years after the war, in the book Battles and Leaders of the Civil War, there was a claim that a Manassas crewman was knocked off the ironclad by a Union sailor; however Lieutenant Warley reported no casualties among his Manassas crew in an official report dated 13 August 1863.

== Clipper ==
Manassas is a similarly named clipper, formerly the U.S. Revenue Cutter Afinot, was seized by the Confederates at New Bern, North Carolina, on 27 August 1861. With the launches Mosquito and Sand Fly, she was placed under Lt. W. H. Murdaugh, CSN, who was seriously wounded in the Federal attack on Fort Hatteras the next day, and was unable to assume his command. Manassas was active on the coast of North Carolina during 1861-62 and then dismantled by the Confederates.
