= List of shipwrecks in June 1862 =

The list of shipwrecks in June 1862 includes ships sunk, foundered, grounded, or otherwise lost during June 1862.

== 1 June ==
List of shipwrecks: 1 June 1862
Ship	State	Description
Clara Rosa Sutel	United States	The barque ran aground off "Cojovo", Venezuela and was plundered by the local inhabitants. She was subsequently refloated with the assistance of a Venezuelan warship and two merchant ships.
D. B. Sexton	United Kingdom	The ship departed from Cardiff, Glamorgan for Barcelona, Spain. No further trace, presumed foundered with the loss of all hands.
Janet Willis	United Kingdom	The ship departed from Calcutta, India for Hamburg. No further trace, presumed foundered with the loss of all hands.
Louisiana Bell	Confederate States of America	The 89-ton sternwheel paddle steamer burned on the Red River of the South in Louisiana. She was repaired and returned to service.
Rapid	United Kingdom	The brig foundered in the North Sea. Her crew were rescued by Balders (Norway). Rapid was on a voyage from Grangemouth, Stirlingshire to Gothenburg, Sweden.

== 2 June ==
List of shipwrecks: 2 June 1862
Ship	State	Description
Tasmanian	(United Kingdom of Great Britain and Ireland) Tasmania	The steamship ran aground and was wrecked at Wairoa, New Zealand.

== 3 June ==
List of shipwrecks: 3 June 1862
Ship	State	Description
Carrie Ladd	United States	The 128-ton sternwheel paddle steamer sank in the Columbia River in Oregon about 18 miles (29 km) below the Cascades Rapids.

== 4 June ==
List of shipwrecks: 4 June 1862
Ship	State	Description
Arrow	Confederate States Army	American Civil War: The gunboat was burned on the West Pearl River in Louisiana to prevent her capture by Union forces.
Eliza	United Kingdom	The ship was driven ashore at Souter Point, County Durham. She was on a voyage from Sunderland, County Durham to Montrose, Forfarshire. She was refloated the next day and put back to Sunderland.
Happy Return	United Kingdom	The schooner struck a sunken rock in the Sound of Mull. she was on a voyage from Newcastle upon Tyne, Northumberland to Dublin. She put in to Tobermory, Isle of Mull, where she sank.
Heilige Willebrodus	Netherlands	The brig ran aground on the Lammock, 20 nautical miles (37 km) south east of Swatow, China.

== 5 June ==
List of shipwrecks: 5 June 1862
Ship	State	Description
Erin	United Kingdom	The schooner was driven ashore at Moville, County Donegal. She had been refloated by 14 June.
Harriet	United Kingdom	The schooner was driven ashore at Moville. She had been refloated by 14 June.
Havana, or Havanah	Confederate States of America	American Civil War, Union blockade: The screw steamer was set afire by her crew at Deadman's Bay on the coast of Florida to prevent her capture by the schooner USS Isilda (United States Navy).
Rathsay	United Kingdom	The ship was wrecked on the south coast of Chile.
Sovereign	Confederate States of America	American Civil War: The sidewheel paddle steamer ran aground and was captured by a United States Navy tug near Island Number 37 on the Mississippi River. She was refloated and placed in Union service.
St. Olaff	Norway	The barque ran aground in Table Bay. She was on a voyage from Liverpool, Lancashire, United Kingdom to Calcutta, India. She was later refloated. Although condemned, she was sold, repaired and returned to service as Crusader (Flag unknown).
Tennessee	Confederate States of America	American Civil War: The incomplete ironclad ram was burned prior to launching at Memphis, Tennessee, to prevent her capture by Union forces.

== 6 June ==
List of shipwrecks: 6 June 1862
Ship	State	Description
Ariel	United Kingdom	The brig sprang a leak and foundered in the Bristol Channel off Hartland Point, Devon. Her crew survived. She was on a voyage from Neath, Glamorgan to London.
CSS Colonel Lovell	Confederate States Navy	American Civil War, First Battle of Memphis: The cottonclad ram sank in the Mississippi River just above Memphis, Tennessee, after being rammed by the sidewheel rams Queen of the West and Monarch (both United States Army). Six or seven of her crew survived.
Gordon Grant	United States	The 41-ton screw steamer burned on the Mississippi River at Fort Pillow, Tennessee.
CSS General Beauregard	Confederate States Navy	American Civil War, First Battle of Memphis: The cottonclad ram exploded and sank with heavy loss of life in the Mississippi River just above Memphis, Tennessee after a shot by the casemate ironclad USS Benton (United States Army) hit her boiler, scalding many of her crew. Her survivors were taken prisoner by Benton and the sidewheel ram USS Monarch (United States Army)
CSS General Bragg	Confederate States Navy	American Civil War, First Battle of Memphis: The cottonclad ram ran aground in the Mississippi River just above Memphis, Tennessee and was captured by Union forces. She was refloated, repaired, and placed in service as USS General Bragg.
CSS General M. Jeff Thompson	Confederate States Navy	General M. Jeff Thompson (left) American Civil War, First Battle of Memphis: Heavily damaged by shell hits and burning, the cottonclad ram ran aground in the Mississippi River just above Memphis, Tennessee, and was abandoned by her crew. She burned to the waterline and exploded when the flames detonated her ammunition magazine.
CSS General Sterling Price	Confederate States Navy	American Civil War, First Battle of Memphis: The cottonclad ram sank on a sandbar in the Mississippi River just above Memphis, Tennessee, after colliding with the ram CSS General Beauregard (Confederate States Navy) and being rammed by the casemate ironclad USS Benton (United States Army). She was seized by Union forces, raised, repaired, and placed in United States Navy service as USS General Price.
CSS General Sumter	Confederate States Navy	American Civil War, First Battle of Memphis: Badly damaged, the cottonclad ram ran aground on the Arkansas shore of the Mississippi River just above Memphis, Tennessee, and was captured by Union forces. She was refloated, repaired, and placed in United States Navy service as USS Sumter.
CSS Little Rebel	Confederate States Navy	American Civil War], First Battle of Memphis: Hit in her boilers by gunfire from the casemate ironclad USS Carondelet (United States Army), the cottonclad ram was rammed and driven ashore by the sidewheel ram USS Monarch (United States Army) on the Mississippi River just above Memphis, Tennessee. Abandoned by her surviving crew, she was captured by Union forces, refloated, repaired, and placed in United States Navy service as USS Little Rebel.
Moose	United Kingdom	The schooner sprang a leak and was beached at Black Pill, Glamorgan, where she capsized and was wrecked. Her crew survived.
Oriel	United Kingdom	The ship foundered off Hartland Point, Devon. Her crew survived. she was on a voyage from Neath, Glamorgan to London.

== 7 June ==
List of shipwrecks: 7 June 1862
Ship	State	Description
Czar	United Kingdom	The steamship ran aground on Stoneskar, Russia. She was on a voyage from Leith, Lothian to Kronstadt, Russia. She was refloated the next day with assistance from the frigate Oleg (Imperial Russian Navy). and taken in to Kronstadt.
George and Alexander	United Kingdom	The ship was driven ashore and wrecked in Aberdeen Bay. Her crew were rescued. She was on a voyage from Inverness to Newcastle upon Tyne, Northumberland.
James Gibbs	United Kingdom	The barque was wrecked on Seskar, Russia. She was abandoned by her twenty crew the next day. She was on a voyage from Hull, Yorkshire to Kronstadt, Russia. Her captain was subsequently charged with wilfully wrecking the vessel.
Kingston	United Kingdom	The ship was driven ashore and wrecked at Budleigh Salterton, Devon. Her crew were rescued. She was on a voyage from Hartlepool, County Durham to Cardiff, Glamorgan.
Surinam	(Netherlands) Surinam	The ship ran aground in a river in Surinam. She was on a voyage from London, United Kingdom to a port in Surinam. She was refloated on 9 June and taken in to port in a sinking condition.
Trent	United Kingdom	The steamship ran aground on Nickman's Ground, in the Baltic Sea and was wrecked. All on board were rescued. She was on the return leg of her maiden voyage, from Kronstadt, Russia to Hull, Yorkshire.

== 8 June ==
List of shipwrecks: 8 June 1862
Ship	State	Description
A. and A.	United Kingdom	The full-rigged ship was driven onto a reef off Isla Cardona, Puerto Rico in a squall. She was on a voyage from Ponce. Puerto Rico to Liverpool, Lancashire.
Mary	United Kingdom	The smack struck a sunken wreck off the Farne Islands, Northumberland. Her crew survived. She was on a voyage from London to Glasgow, Renfrewshire. Mary was towed in to South Shields, County Durham on 16 June by the tugs Leander and Imperial Prince (both United Kingdom).
Ranger	United Kingdom	The ship was driven ashore and wrecked near "Gronhoe", Denmark. Her crew were rescued. She was on a voyage from Sunderland, County Durham to Kronstadt, Russia.
Sereta	Flag unknown	American Civil War, Union blockade: The 30-ton schooner, loaded with a cargo of fruit and salt, was burned by the gunboat USS Penobscot (United States Navy), which discovered her aground and abandoned off Shallotte Inlet, North Carolina. Confederate States of America.

== 9 June ==
List of shipwrecks: 9 June 1862
Ship	State	Description
Lebanon	United Kingdom	The barque was abandoned in the Atlantic Ocean. Her fourteen crew were rescued by the schooner Mountaineer (United Kingdom). Lebanon was on a voyage from Quebec City, Province of Canada, British North America to Belfast, County Antrim.
Scuppernong	Confederate States of America	American Civil War, Union blockade: The steamer, loaded with a cargo of timber intended for use in building a steamer, was burned below a bridge in Indian Town, North Carolina, by a boat expedition from the gunboat USS Commodore Perry (United States Navy).

== 10 June ==
List of shipwrecks: 10 June 1862
Ship	State	Description
Elidir	United Kingdom	The ship struck the Gainer Rock and was abandoned by her crew. She subsequently came ashore in Dungarvon Bay in a severely damaged condition. She was on a voyage from Newcastle upon Tyne, Northumberland to Cork.

== 11 June ==
List of shipwrecks: 11 June 1862
Ship	State	Description
Fairy	United Kingdom	The schooner foundered 5 nautical miles (9.3 km) south west of the Tuskar Rock with the loss of one of her four crew. She was on a voyage from Barrow in Furness, Lancashire to Newport, Monmouthshire.
Freden Kohl	Sweden	The schooner sank in the North Sea. Her crew were rescued by Amalia (Flag unknown).
Futtah Robman	India	The ship was wrecked in the Hooghly River.
Jane & Elizabeth	United Kingdom	The brig collided with the brigantine D'Illion (United Kingdom) and was consequently beached on the Shingles, off the Isle of Wight. She was on a voyage from South Shields, County Durham to Plymouth, Devon. She was refloated and taken in to Cowes, Isle of Wight in a severely leaky condition.

== 12 June ==
List of shipwrecks: 12 June 1862
Ship	State	Description
Fortitude	United Kingdom	The ship ran aground at Arkhangelsk, Russia. She was on a voyage from Arkhangelsk to London. She subsequently broke up.
Swift	United Kingdom	The schooner was driven ashore in the Scheldt. She was on a voyage from Antwerp, Belgium to Liverpool, Lancashire. She was refloated the next day and towed back to Antwerp.

== 13 June ==
List of shipwrecks: 13 June 1862
Ship	State	Description
Elizabeth	France	The brig was wrecked at the Pointe de la Coubre, at the mouth of the Gironde with the loss of all on board. She was on a voyage from Bordeaux, Gironde to New York, United States.
Fury	United Kingdom	The paddle tug was run into by the schooner Ann & Isabella (United Kingdom) and was consequently beached at South Shields, County Durham.
Rover	United Kingdom	The brig was wrecked on the Anse de Plombl, off the Île de Ré, Finistère, France. Her crew were rescued.

== 15 June ==
List of shipwrecks: 15 June 1862
Ship	State	Description
Valleyfield	United Kingdom	The barque was wrecked on a reef off the Green Point Lighthouse, Cape Town, Cape Colony with the loss of nine lives. She was on a voyage from Liverpool, Lancashire to the Cape of Good Hope, Cape Colony.
Virginia	United Kingdom	The ship was driven into Zouave (United Kingdom at Bombay, India and was severely damaged.

== 16 June ==
List of shipwrecks: 16 June 1862
Ship	State	Description
Anna Smith	Confederate States of America	American Civil War, Union blockade: Carrying a cargo of cotton, lumber, and other goods, the schooner was destroyed at Cedar Key, Florida, by the gunboat USS Hatteras (United States Navy.
Dudley	Confederate States of America	American Civil War, Union blockade: Carrying a cargo of turpentine and rosin, the 57-ton sloop was destroyed at Cedar Key, Florida by the gunboat USS Hatteras (United States Navy.
Eliza G.	Confederate States of America	American Civil War: The steamer was scuttled as a blockship in the White River near St. Charles, Arkansas.
CSS Mary Patterson	Confederate States Navy	American Civil War: The steamer was scuttled as a blockship in the White River near St. Charles, Arkansas.
CSS Maurepas	Confederate States Navy	American Civil War: The gunboat, a sidewheel paddle steamer, was scuttled as a blockship in the White River near St. Charles, Arkansas.
Rosa	United Kingdom	The brig ran aground at the mouth of the River Tyne. She was on a voyage from North Shields, Northumberland to London. She was refloated and put back to North Shields in a severely leaky condition.

== 17 June ==
List of shipwrecks: 17 June 1862
Ship	State	Description
Cecile	Confederate States of America	American Civil War, Union blockade: Carrying a cargo for the Confederate States Navy of cannons, ammunition wagons, knapsacks, harnesses, rifle-muskets, and gunpowder on a blockade-running voyage, the 460-Gross register ton sidewheel paddle steamer sank in ten minutes after striking a reef off the Abaco Islands in the Northeast Providence Channel in the northern Bahamas near the Abaco Lighthouse and Hole in the Wall.
Cortes	United States	The 1,117-ton sidewheel paddle steamer burned at Shanghai, China.
James Pilkington	United Kingdom	The ship was wrecked at Bassein, India with the loss of two of the 33 people on board She was on a voyage from Liverpool, Lancashire to Bombay, India.
L. N. H. Vindt	Danzig	The steamship ran aground off Brielle, North Holland, Netherlands.

== 18 June ==
List of shipwrecks: 18 June 1862
Ship	State	Description
Venus	United Kingdom	The sloop collided with a brigantine and sank in the River Mersey at New Ferry, Cheshire.

== 19 June ==
List of shipwrecks: 19 June 1862
Ship	State	Description
Commodore	United Kingdom	The brig was wrecked on the Horse Bank, in the Irish Sea off the coast of Lancashire. Her captain was rescued by a fishing smack, the rest of the crew reached land in their boat.
Union Star	United States	The steamship suffered a boiler explosion and sank in the Yangtze with the loss of nineteen lives.
Unnamed	Prussia	The brig was towed in to North Shields, Northumberland, United Kingdom in a capsized condition. Her identity could not be established, but it was thought that she had previously sailed under the British flag as Stockton.

== 20 June ==
List of shipwrecks: 20 June 1862
Ship	State	Description
Agnes	United States	The 299-ton screw steamer burned in Virginia, Confederate States of America.
Independence	United States	The schooner was lost north of Point Judith, Rhode Island.

== 21 June ==
List of shipwrecks: 21 June 1862
Ship	State	Description
Cubana	United Kingdom	The barque was destroyed by fire in the Atlantic Ocean (54°40′N 59°23′E). All eighteen people on board reached the Falkland Islands in their boat on 27 June. She was on a voyage from Caldera, Chile to Swansea, Glamorgan.

== 22 June ==
List of shipwrecks: 22 June 1862
Ship	State	Description
Abeona	United Kingdom	The ship was sunk by ice off Belle Isle, Newfoundland, British North America. Her crew were rescued. She was on a voyage from a British port to Indian Tickle, Labrador, British North America.
Ann Davis	United Kingdom	The ship was wrecked at Cripple Cove, Newfoundland, British North America. Her crew were rescued. She was on a voyage from Cádiz, Spain to Burin, Newfoundland.
Lord Nelson	United Kingdom	The sloop was driven ashore and wrecked at Thisted, Denmark. Her crew survived. She was on a voyage from Stornoway, Isle of Lewis, Outer Hebrides to Danzig.

== 23 June ==
List of shipwrecks: 23 June 1862
Ship	State	Description
Eleanor	United Kingdom	The brig was driven ashore and wrecked at Portsall, Finistère, France. Her crew were rescued. She was on a voyage from Sunderland, County Durham to San Sebastián, Spain.
Marengo	United States	The ship was abandoned in the Atlantic Ocean. Her crew were rescued by Charlotte Helen (United Kingdom). She was on a voyage from Huelva, Spain to Liverpool, Lancashire, United Kingdom.
Memphis	United Kingdom	American Civil War, Union Blockade: The steamship ran aground off Sullivan's Island, South Carolina, Confederate States of America. She was on her maiden voyage, from Liverpool, Lancashire to Nassau, Bahamas and Charleston, South Carolina. She was refloated with assistance from the steamships Etiwan and Marlon (both Confederate States of America) and taken in to Charleston.

== 24 June ==
List of shipwrecks: 24 June 1862
Ship	State	Description
Araby Maid	United Kingdom	The ship was wrecked on the Grenville Ledge, off the coast of Labrador, British North America. She was on a voyage from Montreal, Province of Canada, British North America to Queenstown, County Cork.
Centurion	United Kingdom	The ship ran aground on the Coal Rock. She was on a voyage form New York, United States to Liverpool, Lancashire. She was refloated and towed in to Beaumaris, Anglesey in a severely damaged condition.
Isaac	United Kingdom	The ship foundered off "Oxoe", Norway. Her crew were rescued. She was on a voyage from Sunderland, County Durham to Swinemünde, Prussia.
Mary	United Kingdom	The sloop foundered off the coast of Norway. She was on a voyage from Gateshead, County Durham to Bergen, Norway. A message in a bottle giving details of the vessel's loss washed up at North Queensferry, Fife on 8 October.
New Rambler	United Kingdom	The schooner ran aground on the Middelgrund, in the Baltic Sea. She was on a voyage from Danzig to an English port.

== 25 June ==
List of shipwrecks: 26 June 1862
Ship	State	Description
Duke of Cornwall	United Kingdom	The ship was driven ashore near Lymington, Hampshire. She was on a voyage from Dublin to London.
Emily	Confederate States of America	American Civil War, Union blockade: Pursued by the armed screw steamers USS Mount Vernon, USS Mystic, and USS Victoria (all United States Navy), the schooner, carrying a cargo of salt, ran aground on the coast of North Carolina near Fort Caswell while trying to run the Union blockade with a cargo of salt. Her crew abandoned ship, and a United States Navy boat crew boarded her and set her on fire. After the fire went out, her crew reboarded her, but fled to shore when United States Navy boats again approached her. United States Navy vessels then towed her off and burned her to the waterline.

== 26 June ==
List of shipwrecks: 26 June 1862
Ship	State	Description
Alexander Tchernitzy	Russia	The brig was abandoned in the Atlantic Ocean. Her crew were rescued by Prode (Flag unknown). Alexander Tcherntizy was on a voyage from Huelva, Spain to Newcastle upon Tyne, Northumberland, United Kingdom.
Ellen	Confederate States of America	American Civil War, Union blockade: Pursued by the armed screw steamers USS Mount Vernon, USS Mystic, and USS Victoria (all United States Navy), the schooner ran aground on the coast of North Carolina while trying to run the Union blockade at the Bald Head Channel and enter port at Wilmington, North Carolina. A boat crew from Mount Vernon then boarded and captured her and Victoria attempted to tow her off, but she sank.
CSS General Earl Van Dorn	Confederate States Navy	American Civil War: The sidewheel ram was burned on the Yazoo River off Liverpool, Mississippi to prevent her capture by Union forces. She blew up when the flames reached her magazine.
CSS General Polk	Confederate States Navy	American Civil War: The timberclad sidewheel gunboat was burned on the Yazoo River off Liverpool, Mississippi to prevent her capture by Union forces.
La Plata	United Kingdom	The steamship ran aground off Brielle, North Holland, Netherlands. She was refloated the next day.
CSS Livingston	Confederate States Navy	American Civil War: The screw gunboat was burned on the Yazoo River off Liverpool, Mississippi to prevent her capture by Union forces.
Monticello	Unknown	American Civil War, Union blockade: The schooner ran aground on the coast of Alabama, Confederate States of America between 6 and 8 miles (10 and 13 km) east of Fort Morgan. Her crew burned her.

== 27 June ==
List of shipwrecks: 27 June 1862
Ship	State	Description
Hecta	United Kingdom	The schooner sprang a leak and was beached in Tremone Bay, County Donegal, where she was wrecked. She was on a voyage from Glasgow, Renfrewshire to Iceland.
Jessie	United Kingdom	The lighter ran aground, capsized and sank in the River Clyde. Her crew were rescued.
Modern Greece	United Kingdom	American Civil War, Union blockade: Pursued by the gunboat USS Cambridge, the blockade runner, a steamship carrying a cargo of rifled cannon, other weapons, and gunpowder, ran aground at Fort Fisher, North Carolina, Confederate States of America. All 31 people on board abandoned ship. USS Cambridge then destroyed her. Modern Greece was on a voyage from Port Nelson, Bahamas to Wilmington, North Carolina.
St. Lawrence	United Kingdom	The smack sprang a leak and foundered in the Firth of Clyde between Pladda and Ailsa Craig. Her crew were rescued. She was on a voyage from Troon, Ayrshire to Belfast, County Antrim.
Thomas	United Kingdom	The brig was driven ashore in the "Takee River", China.
Wave	Confederate States of America	American Civil War, Union blockade: During a voyage from Mobile, Alabama, to Mississippi City, Mississippi, with a cargo of flour, the sloop was captured and burned by the brig USS Bohio (United States Navy) in the Gulf of Mexico along the coast of Alabama.

== 28 June ==
List of shipwrecks: 28 June 1862
Ship	State	Description
Argo	United Kingdom	The ship ran aground on the Middelgrund, in the Baltic Sea. She was on a voyage from Riga, Russia to Portsmouth, Hampshire. She was refloated and resumed her voyage.
Capitol	Confederate States of America	American Civil War: The sidewheel paddle steamer burned on the Yazoo River at Liverpool, Mississippi.
Chesapeake	United Kingdom	The schooner was run down and sunk in the Bristol Channel 8 nautical miles (15 km) south west of Lundy Island, Devon by the full-rigged ship Screamer (United States) with the loss of her captain and a crew member reported missing. Chesapeake was on a voyage from Swansea, Glamorgan to Cowes, Isle of Wight.
USS Island Belle	United States Navy	American Civil War: The armed tug ran aground on Gilliam’s Bar in the Appomattox River near City Point, Virginia, and was burned to prevent her capture by Confederate forces.

== 29 June ==
List of shipwrecks: 29 June 1862
Ship	State	Description
Ann	United Kingdom	American Civil War, Union blockade: Carrying a cargo of gunpowder and musket caps, the steamer ran aground on the coast of Alabama, Confederate States of America at the mouth of Mobile Bay. After Confederate forces salvaged some of her cargo, she drifted free of the shore on 30 June and was captured by Union forces.
White Swan	(United Kingdom of Great Britain and Ireland) New Zealand	The screw steamer, carrying 65 passengers including many parliamentary leaders including Premier William Fox, left Napier for Wellington on 28 June. On 29 June, the ship hit a reef near Uruti Point on the Wairarapa coast, holing a forward compartment. The ship was run ashore to prevent loss of life, but many irreplaceable government papers were lost.

== 30 June ==
List of shipwrecks: 30 June 1862
Ship	State	Description
Falcon	United Kingdom	The schooner ran ashore near "Voel Nant" and was abandoned by her crew. She was on a voyage from Ballina, County Mayo to Liverpool, Lancashire.
Flash	United Kingdom	The ship ran ashore in the Sound of Mull. She was on a voyage from Dublin to the River Wear. She was refloated on 3 July and resumed her voyage.
Reine Marie	France	The ship foundered north of Lisbon, Portugal. Her crew were rescued. She was on a voyage from Villareal, Spain to Newcastle upon Tyne, Northumberland, United Kingdom.
Thomas Snook	United Kingdom	The brig collided with the barque City of Carlisle (United Kingdom) in the English Channel off Hastings, Sussex, with the loss of her captain and two members of her crew. Survivors were rescued by City of Carlisle/

== Unknown date ==
List of shipwrecks: Unknown date in June 1862
Ship	State	Description
Achilles	Bremen	The brig ran aground on the Mochos Reef before 7 June and was abandoned by her crew. She was on a voyage from Bremen to Matanzas, Cuba. She was refloated and taken in to Nassau, Bahamas.
Arab	United Kingdom	The ship sprang a leak and was beached near Ponta Verde, Brazil between 16 and 30 June.
B. F. Hoxie	United States	American Civil War: The clipper was captured by CSS Florida (Confederate States Navy) and was burnt.
Blue Jacket	United Kingdom	The ship was wrecked. She was on a voyage from Calcutta to Madras, India.
Bravo	United States	The ship was abandoned. She was on a voyage from New York to Dunkirk, Nord, France.
Carricade	Portugal	The ship was wrecked at the mouth of the Rio Grande. She was on a voyage from Lisbon to the Rio Grande.
Foster	United Kingdom	The ship was wrecked at Saint Helena.
Garibaldi	United Kingdom	The barque was abandoned off Peniche, Portugal. Her crew were rescued.
Hooite	Netherlands	The ship was wrecked near Algiers, Algeria. She was on a voyage from Amsterdam, North Holland to Naples, Italy.
Impetus	United Kingdom	The ship ran aground on a reef off Barbados.
Jordan	United Kingdom	The ship was driven ashore in the Black Sea. She was on a voyage from Malta to Kertch, Russia. She was refloated and taken in to Kertch in a severely damaged condition.
Joseph Howe	United Kingdom	The ship was abandoned in the Atlantic Ocean 500 nautical miles (930 km) off Cape Clear Island, County Cork.
Lady Mona	United Kingdom	The ship was wrecked before 19 June. She was on a voyage from a port in Uruguay to Liverpool.
Ligiero II	Portugal	The brig was wrecked on the Ine Joaosinho Shoals, off Cape Gunhihi, Brazil before 20 June. Her crew survived.
Louis Napoleon	France	The ship was driven ashore at "Uocoa Point".
Mary Ann	United Kingdom	The ship was wrecked at Richibucto, New Brunswick, British North America.
HMS Mutine	Royal Navy	The Greyhound-class sloop was driven ashore at Manzanillo, Mexico. She was later refloated.
Phoenix	(United Kingdom of Great Britain and Ireland) New Zealand	The steamship was wrecked at Auckland.
Reve Maria	Spain	The ship foundered in the Atlantic Ocean off Lisbon, Portugal. She was on a voyage from Huelva to Newcastle upon Tyne, Northumberland, United Kingdom.
Sarah & Dorothy	United Kingdom	The ship was lost whilst on a voyage from a British port to Arkhangelsk, Russia. Her crew were rescued.
Spray	United Kingdom	The schooner was driven ashore at Courtown, County Wexford.
Starr King	United States	The medium clipper was driven ashore at Point Romania, Singapore. She was a total loss.
Zone	United States	The ship was driven ashore and wrecked on Cape Sable Island, Nova Scotia, British North America. She was on a voyage from North Shields, Northumberland to Portland, Maine.
