= Kenneth Alford =

Kenneth Alford may refer to:

- Kenneth J. Alford (1881–1945), British composer
- Kenneth D. Alford, American non-fiction writer
