= General Polk =

General Polk may refer to:

- James H. Polk (1911–1992), U.S. Army four-star general
- Leonidas Polk (1806–1864), Confederate States Army major general
- Lucius E. Polk (1833–1892), Confederate States Army brigadier general
- Thomas Polk (c. 1732–1794), North Carolina Militia brigadier general in the American Revolutionary War
- CSS General Polk, a Confederate gunboat
