= Lawrence Rousseau =

Confederate naval officer (1809–1877)

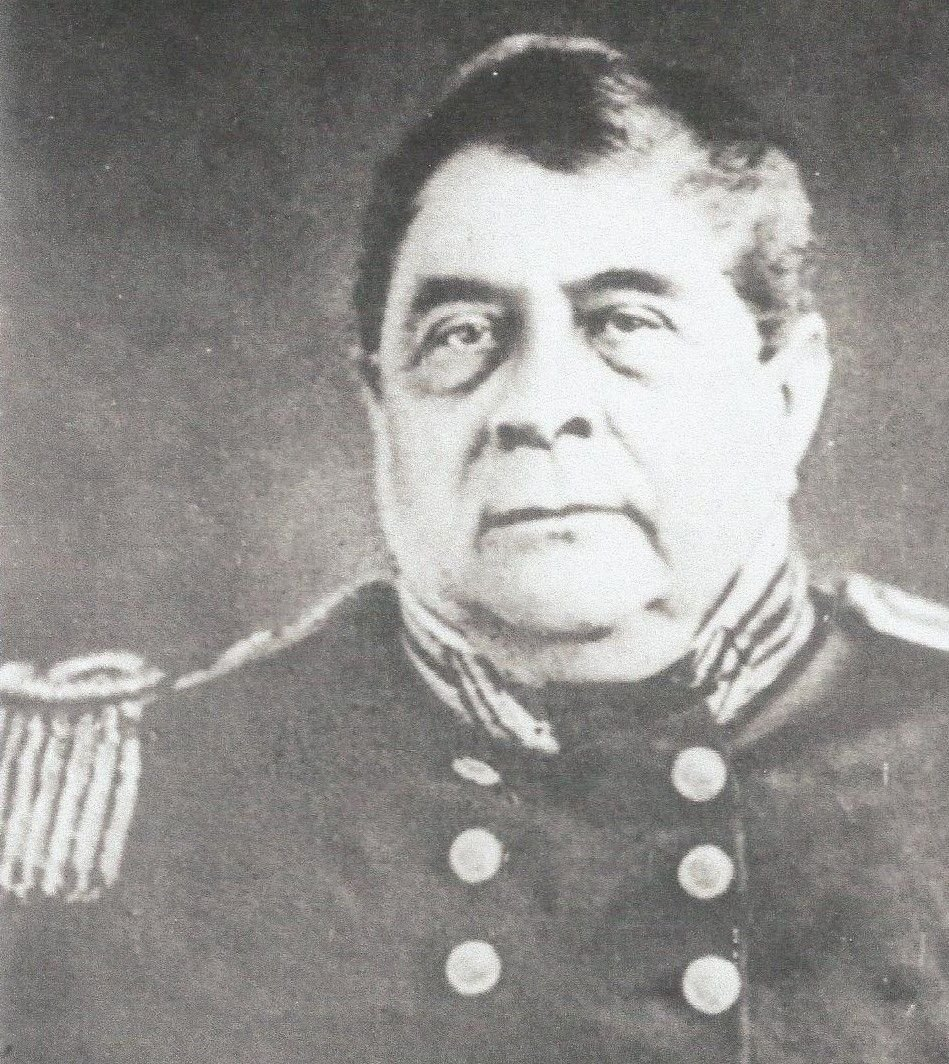
- Born: July 15, 1790; New Orleans, New Spain, Spanish Empire
- Died: September 4, 1866 (aged 76); New Orleans, Louisiana, U.S.
- Military career
- Allegiance: United States; Confederate States
- Branch: United States Navy; Confederate States Navy
- Service years: 1809–1861 (USN); 1861–1865 (CSN)
- Rank: Captain/commodore (USN); Captain (CSN)
- Commands: USS Dolphin; USS Erie; USS Falmouth; USS St. Louis; USS Macedonian; Brazil Squadron
- Wars: War of 1812; Mexican–American War; American Civil War

Lawrence Rousseau (July 15, 1790 – September 4, 1866) was an American naval officer. When the American Civil War broke out in 1861, he was the highest-ranking and longest-serving United States Navy officer to join the Confederate side. He was the most senior Confederate States Navy (CSN) officer from 1861 to 1862. and later on (after more senior officers had surrendered). He and the last organized remnant of the CSN surrendered at Nanna Hubba Bluff, Alabama, on May 4 or 10, 1865.

== Early life ==
He was born in New Orleans when it was a Spanish colonial possession, one of 12 children of Pierre George Rousseau and Marie Catherine Milhet. Pierre Rousseau served in the Continental Navy and commanded the brig sloop Gálveztown.

After the 1803 Louisiana Purchase, Lawrence Rousseau became an American citizen.

== Naval career ==
=== United States Navy ===
With the assistance of David Porter, the commandant of New Orleans, Rousseau was appointed a midshipman on January 16, 1809, the start of a naval career of 56 years. He was appointed acting master of the brig USS Viper on January 27, 1811, and acting lieutenant on November 12.

During the War of 1812, Viper was captured in the Gulf of Mexico by HMS Narcissus on January 17, 1813. Rousseau and most of the other officers were sent to New Providence, Bahamas, but he was later exchanged and sailed for New York on June 13. On July 24, he was promoted to lieutenant. He served aboard the sloop USS Erie, which was blockaded in Baltimore. On April 11, 1814, however, he was reassigned to the brig USS Jefferson on Lake Ontario. On March 22, 1815, he returned to Erie, where he served for 28 months. While sailing to Baltimore, he survived the shipwreck of Surprise on April 3, 1815.

After the end of the war in 1815, he was stationed at New Orleans Naval Station from 1818 to 1823. In 1819, Rousseau married Josephine Nesida Cruzat-Ramos or Nisida Laura Josephine de Lino Cruzat (May 12, 1800 – August 2, 1878), a member of a prominent Creole family. The couple had no children.

In 1823, he returned to sea duty. One source states he was given command of USS Greyhound, but another source states that Master Commandant John Porter was in charge. On November 1, he was given command of Thompson's Island naval station, near present-day Key West, where he conducted several anti-pirate operations. He then returned to New Orleans. On August 31, 1826, he was ordered to take command of the schooner USS Dolphin, part of the Pacific Fleet. He was promoted to master commandant (a rank renamed to commander in 1837) on April 24, 1828. He returned the United States in November. On November 4, 1829, he was given command of the Pensacola Navy Yard, serving until September 16, 1830, whereupon he was placed in command of his old ship, Erie, and tasked with combatting piracy in the West Indies. While serving in the West Indies Squadron from 1830 to 1837, he also commanded the sloops of war USS Erie, USS Falmouth and USS St. Louis.

He rose to captain effective February 9, 1837. On August 1, 1838, he was ordered to survey the coast of the Gulf of Mexico for locations for lighthouses; his report and recommendations were presented by 1842. His next command was the frigate USS Macedonian, part of the West Indies Squadron.

From 1845 to 1847, he commanded the Brazil Squadron, and was accorded the courtesy title of commodore. He sailed from Hampton Roads on November 14 and arrived in Rio de Janeiro in 52 days.

Rousseau returned to the United States in 1847, and in October 6, 1848, he and New Orleans naval agent S. B. Bennett were assigned to select and purchase a site for the New Orleans navy yard. On February 24, 1852, he was appointed to command the Norfolk Navy Yard, but he was reassigned to command the Pensacola Navy Yard instead. In August of that year, he was made captain of the port of New Orleans. He headed the Pensacola Navy Yard from May 4, 1854, to April 29, 1857.

When the South seceded from the Union, he resigned from the USN on January 31, 1861, effective February 11, and joined the CSN.

=== Confederate States Navy ===
Rousseau traveled to Montgomery, Alabama, to engage in the discussion of Confederate naval defences. He enlisted in the CSN on March 26 and was commissioned a captain in the CSN effective March 26, 1861, making him the highest-ranking officer in that service until 1862. (He regained that distinction during the latter stages of the war after more senior officers surrendered to the Union.)

In New Orleans, he headed the Office of Detail and Equipment. He purchased the merchant steamer Habana, which was converted into the Confederacy's first steam cruiser, CSS Sumter. (Sumter, under the command of Raphael Semmes, embarked on commerce raiding and captured 18 prizes in its six-month career.) He also purchased Marquis de la Habana, renamed CSS McRae, and Yankee (renamed CSS Jackson), and obtained other vessels, such as CSS Pamlico and CSS Livingston. He built up the naval defenses of the city, but clashed with Major General David E. Twiggs over several guns Twiggs had taken and refused to return for arming gunboats.

On August 1, 1862, he was reassigned, first to Richmond, then to Jackson station, Savannah station, and finally Mobile. On May 4 or 10, 1865, he surrendered with other Confederate officers and men at Nanna Hubba Bluff, Alabama, and gave his parole not to take up arms against the United States. He was subsequently given a presidential pardon by Andrew Johnson.
