= Failure in the Saddle =

2010 book by David A. Powell

- First edition cover
- Author: David A. Powell
- Language: English
- Genre: American Civil War
- Published: September 2010 Savas Beatie, LLC
- Publication place: United States
- Media type: Print (Hardcover)
- Pages: 384, 6x9, 47 b/w photos, 15 maps, notes, bibliography, index, cloth, dust jacket
- ISBN: 978-1-932714-87-6; 978-1-611210-56-9 (eBook)

Failure in the Saddle: Nathan Bedford Forrest, Joseph Wheeler, and the Confederate Cavalry in the Chickamauga Campaign is a book written by Virginia Military Institute graduate David A. Powell, and published by Savas Beatie, analyzing the failures of Nathan Bedford Forrest and Joseph Wheeler in the American Civil War. Powell draws upon firsthand accounts, many previously unpublished, to offer a detailed examination of the Southern cavalry's role in the Chickamauga campaign.

== Recognition ==
- Winner, 2011, Richard Harwell Award, Given by the Civil War Round Table of Atlanta for the best book on a Civil War topic published in the proceeding year.

== Suggested Reading ==
- The Maps of Chickamauga: An Atlas of the Chickamauga Campaign, Including the Tullahoma Operations, June 22 - September 23, 1863 by David Powell and David Friedrichs
