= USS Memphis =

USS Memphis may refer to:

- USS Memphis (1853), was a wooden five-gun crew steamer chartered by the US Navy for the Paraguay expedition and renamed Mystic 14 June 1859
- USS Memphis (1862), was a civilian steamship purchased by the US Navy from a prize court 4 September 1862 and was decommissioned and sold 8 May 1869
- USS Memphis (CA-10), known for most of her career as Tennessee (ACR-10), was destroyed by heavy waves three months after she was renamed in 1916
- USS Memphis (CL-13), was an Omaha-class light cruiser, saw action in World War II
- USNS Memphis (T-AO-162), was a Cumberland-class fleet oiler acquired by the US Navy 28 November 1956 and transferred to the US Army in 1967
- USS Memphis (SSN-691), is a Los Angeles-class submarine launched 3 April 1976 and decommissioned in 2011
- CSS Memphis, was a Confederate steamer during the American Civil War
