= Battle of Lucas Bend =

1862 battle of the American Civil War

- Part of the Western Theater of the American Civil War
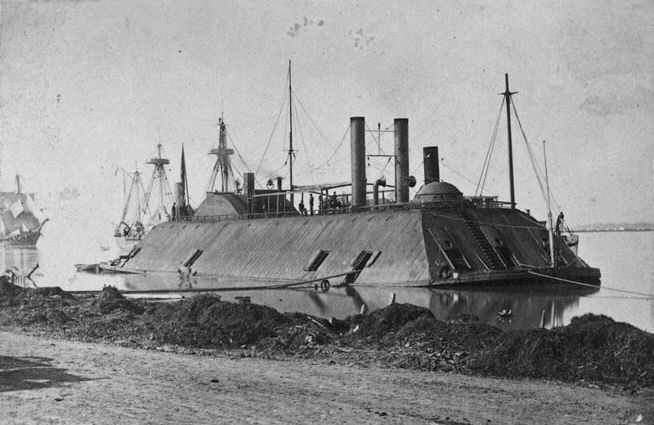
- Porter's USS Essex (view after thorough refit in mid-1862, as an ironclad)
Date	January 11, 1862
Location	Lucas Bend, Mississippi River, Carlisle County, Kentucky 36.796°N 89.167°W
Result	Inconclusive, Confederate ships escape.

Belligerents
United States	Confederate States

Commanders and leaders
(United States Navy) Andrew Hull Foote (United States Navy) William D. Porter	(Confederate States of America) George. N. Hollins (Confederate States of America) John Rodgers

Strength
Two ironclad gunboats: USS Essex; USS St Louis	Three cotton clad gunboats: CSS Jackson; CSS Ivy; CSS General Polk; One floating battery: CSS New Orleans; One on-shore battery at Columbus

Casualties and losses
None	Unknown

The Battle of Lucas Bend took place on January 11, 1862, near Lucas Bend, four miles north of Columbus on Mississippi River in Kentucky as it lay at the time of the American Civil War. In the network of the Mississippi, Tennessee and Ohio rivers, the Union river gunboats under Flag Officer Andrew Hull Foote and General Ulysses S. Grant sought to infiltrate and attack the Confederate positions in Tennessee. On the day of the battle, the Union ironclads Essex and St Louis, transporting troops down the Mississippi in fog, engaged the Confederate cotton clad warships General Polk, Ivy and Jackson and the gun platform New Orleans at a curve known as Lucas Bend in Kentucky. The Essex, under Commander William D. Porter, and the St Louis forced the Confederate ships to fall back after an hour of skirmishing during which the Union commander (which one?) was wounded. They retreated to the safety of a nearby Confederate battery at Columbus, where the Union vessels could not follow.

The battle marked one of the first occasions where timberclad warships were convincingly outclassed by the newer ironclad warships, and it would be one of the last naval engagements to see timberclad warships perform a major role. The term timberclad is usually reserved for the Union ships Lexington, Tyler, and Conestoga which had heavy timber attached as 'armor'. Most Confederate gunboats used cotton bales as their armor. See battle of Plum Run where Confederate 'cottonclads' fought well against the ironclads.

== Prelude ==
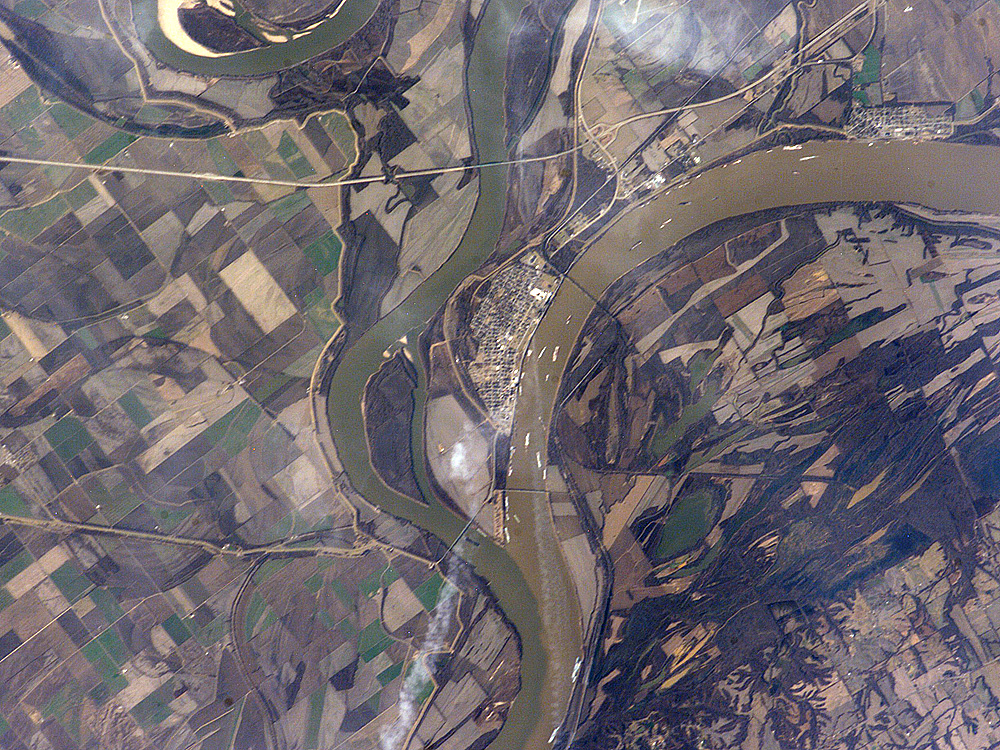
Cairo, Illinois, as viewed from space at the confluence of the Mississippi and Ohio rivers.

The USS Essex had been constructed in 1856. She was a 1000-ton river gunboat, converted from her original role as a timberclad ferry named New Era. She was armed with one 32-pounder cannon, three 11-inch (280 mm) Dahlgren smooth bores, one 10-inch (250 mm) Dahlgren smoothbore and a 12-pounder howitzer. The USS St Louis was a City class ironclad built in 1861 at Carondelet, Missouri. She was armed with three 8-inch smoothbores, four 42-pounder rifles, six 32-pounder rifles and one 12-pounder rifle at the time of her service at Lucas Bend. Both ships were sent to Cairo, Illinois, early in the Civil War as part of troop transports moving the army into Tennessee. Illinois, a Union state which contributed 250,000 men to the Union Army, a figure surpassed by only New York, Pennsylvania, and Ohio, was a key theater. Cairo, at the confluence between the Mississippi and Ohio rivers, was a key supply point and headquarters for Flag Officer Andrew Hull Foote and General Ulysses S. Grant. It was defended by Fort Defiance. The complex river network provided routes for the Union gunboats into the heart of the Confederate forces; however the water levels – particularly in the Tennessee River – were often not sufficient for gunboats to pass.

The Confederate Ivy was launched in 1845 as a privately owned commercial vessel originally named Roger Williams, and later the El-Paraguay. Originally based in New Orleans following her commission in 1861, she was armed with one 8-inch (200 mm) smoothbore cannon and one 32-pounder rifle. The CSS Jackson was another privately owned vessel built in 1849 before being acquired in May 1861 by the Confederacy and commissioned into active service in June. She was armed with two 32-pounder guns, and was ordered to Columbus on June 6, 1861, to join Hollins in the defence of the Mississippi River. She had already seen action against the USS Conestoga on the river. The floating battery New Orleans had been towed up from her namesake city in Louisiana. Lastly, the General Polk was a former side-wheel river steamer named either Ed Howard or Howard. She was built in 1852, and the Confederacy bought her in 1861. She was the vessel from which Hollins commanded the Confederates during the battle, and was known casually as the "Polk".

The Union vessels arrived in October 1861, venturing up the Cumberland River, a tributary of the Ohio, on October 30. The Essex underwent her conversion to a partly ironclad warship in nearby dockyards. Over several weeks between December and January, the Union ships had regularly sailed towards the Confederates on the Mississippi, Ohio, and Tennessee Rivers in order to provoke an engagement, to be frustrated by blank-cartridge shots from the latter's cannons, the Confederates being reluctant to be drawn into a full engagement. On the evening of January 10 the Essex and the St Louis moved off in heavy fog from the ferry landings at Cairo in convoy escorting troop transports carrying Brigadier General John Alexander McClernand's brigade. Their path was blocked for part of the night by a steamer which had run aground north of Cairo, and by Cmdr. William Porter moving off-route to investigate two suspicious, but later revealed to be legitimate, boats moored on the riverside.

== Sighting and engagement ==
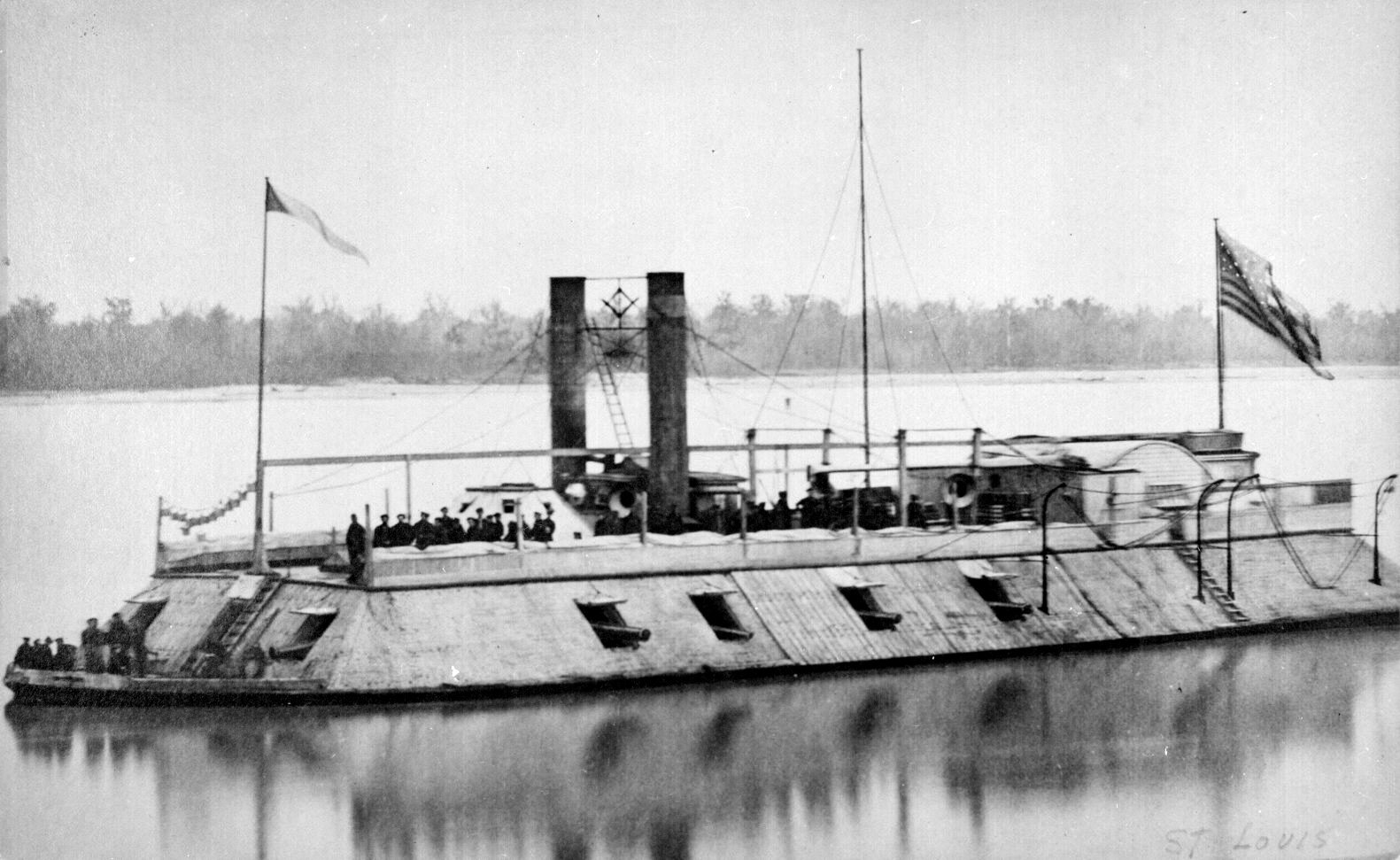
The USS Baron DeKalb, previously the USS St Louis, had been commissioned just days before engagement.

Sighting the Confederate vessels early in the morning of January 11, the Essex's commander Porter beat to quarters at 10:00 that morning, and sailed under the cover of fog towards the enemy ships and engaged near Lucas Bend. Lucas Bend was simply a bend or meander in the Mississippi River roughly four miles north of Columbus and seven miles west of Arlington, Kentucky. Since the time of the Civil War the Army Corps of Engineers cut off many of the bends, including Lucas Bend, to straighten the river and prevent flooding. The historical location of these bends is often marked by state boundaries, which sometimes appear to be land boundaries on the "wrong" side of the river. Thus, today, Lucas Bend consists of an area of Kentucky which lies on the "wrong side" of the present-day main course of the river. In 1862, it was a bend in the river incorporating the state line.

The Confederate forces consisted of three vessels, the CSS General Polk, CSS Ivy, and CSS Jackson – vessels that Porter was aware of from a previous engagement in December – as well as several smaller boats towing the floating battery CSS New Orleans. Until around 11:00 hours, the two forces fought a running battle that was "brisk on both sides" according to Porter.

At Columbus, there was a Confederate battery, to which the Confederate ships fell back. Porter, under standing orders not to engage the Confederate guns, ended the pursuit. Porter himself long desired a decisive victory since he assumed command of the New Era. The troops at the battery, having heard the battle, were under fear of immediate land attack by Union troops. Porter loitered around the Confederate positions, and spotted a pair of buoys in the water. One was sunk with a musket shot, the other was hauled aboard and examined. Porter concluded that they either marked locations of Confederate submarine batteries or indicated a safe pathway through enemy minefields.

== Aftermath ==
"Indeed, this watery skirmish was the first major action fought against Confederate fleet units in which the timberclads were not engaged. It marked a passing of the torch, so to speak. From this time on, Cmdr. Rodgers' original three warriors – now more often called the 'old wooden gunboats' – were regarded not as the major flotilla elements, but as supporting vessels to an expanding and more heavily armoured naval force."

— "Fort Henry: Preparations and Battle, January–February 1862", from M. J. Smith's The Timberclads in the Civil War 2008.

After having reluctantly given up the chase, the Essex and the St Louis returned to Cairo to replenish and begin ammunition runs, and were relieved by two other vessels which took up guarding Fort Holt. In the days following, Porter used a buoy to float towards the Confederate positions a challenge: "Hollins: Why don't you accursed, cowardly rebels bring out your gunboats and fight us. Porter." Confederate Captain Miller sent his reply in the same medium: "Sir: The ironclad steamer Grampus will meet the Essex at any point and time your Honor may appoint and show you that the power is in our hands. An early reply will be agreeable." The ships would meet in the coming weeks, however the Confederate vessels proved speedier than the Union ironclads. Porter's later account of the engagement was syndicated in The New York Times, where it was well received for their "lucid and graphic manner".

The inferiority of the timberclad vessels to the ironclad warships was ever more apparent following the battle, particularly their lack of a stern gun. Following the incident, the Union timberclads were modified to have at least one cannon pointed aft. The Lucas Bend engagement would nevertheless be among the last engagements of the Civil War to see timberclad vessels fulfil anything more than a supporting role for either side. The Essex and St Louis would go on to join Admiral Foote's squadron to capture Fort Henry on February 6. The New Orleans would be scuttled following the Confederate loss at the Battle of Island Number Ten. The CSS Jackson was burned when New Orleans fell in April 1862. Similarly, the CSS General Polk was burned in June 1862 to prevent it from falling into Union hands.
