= Battle of Mine Run =

1863 battle during the American Civil War

Coordinates: 38.3379°N 77.8187°W

- Part of the American Civil War
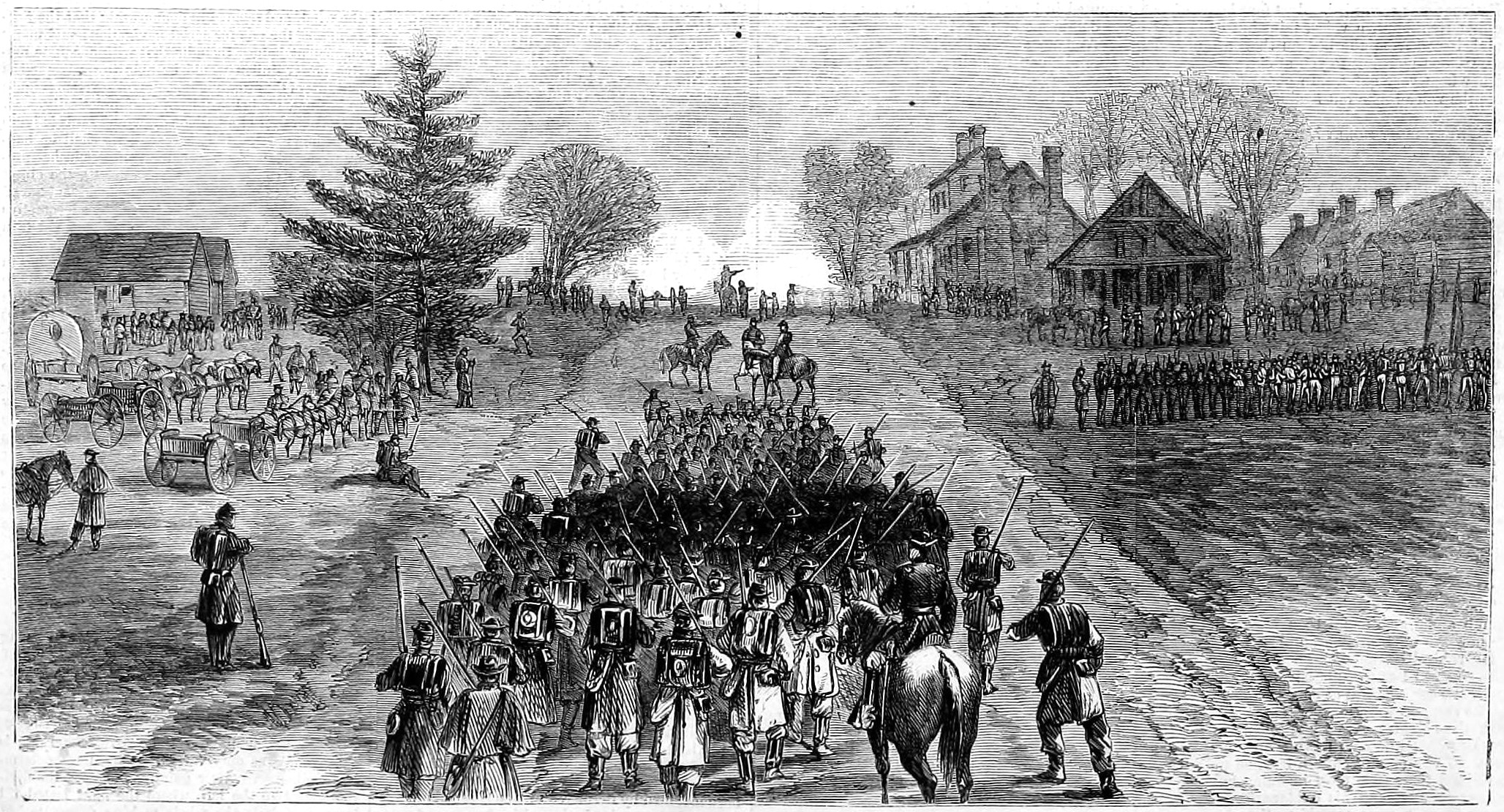
- Artillery bombardment with Warren's troops awaiting attack (from Harper's Weekly)
Date	November 27, 1863 – December 2, 1863
Location	Orange County, Virginia
Result	Inconclusive

Belligerents
United States (Union)	(Confederate States of America) CSA (Confederacy)

Commanders and leaders
George G. Meade	Robert E. Lee

Units involved
Army of the Potomac	Army of Northern Virginia

Strength
81,000	48,000

Casualties and losses
1,653	629

The Battle of Mine Run, also known as Payne's Farm, or New Hope Church, or the Mine Run campaign (November 27 – December 2, 1863), was conducted in Orange County, Virginia, in the American Civil War.

An unsuccessful attempt of the Union Army of the Potomac to defeat the Confederate Army of Northern Virginia, it was marked by false starts and low casualties and ended hostilities in the eastern theater for the year.

== Background ==
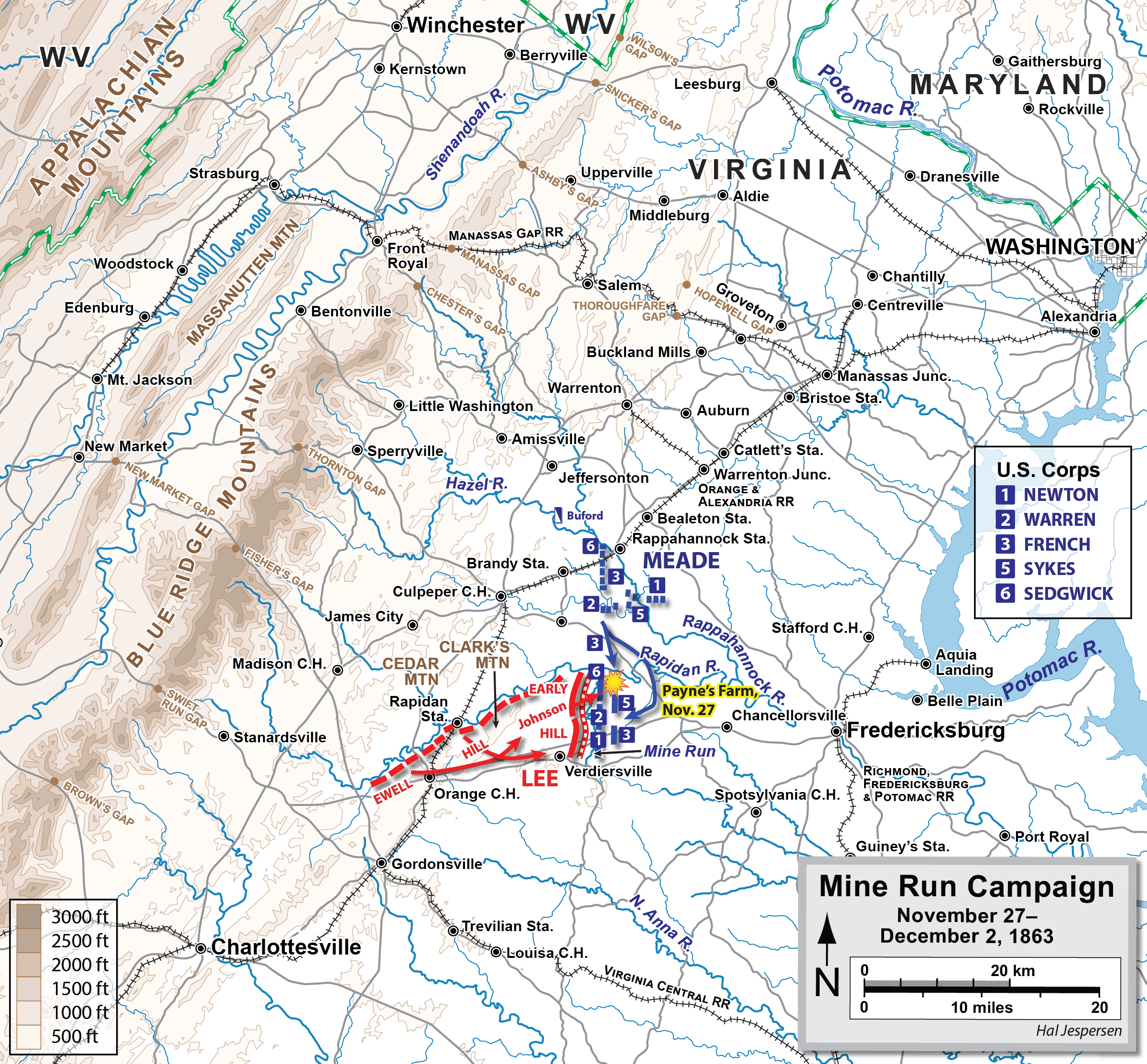
Mine Run campaign Confederate Union

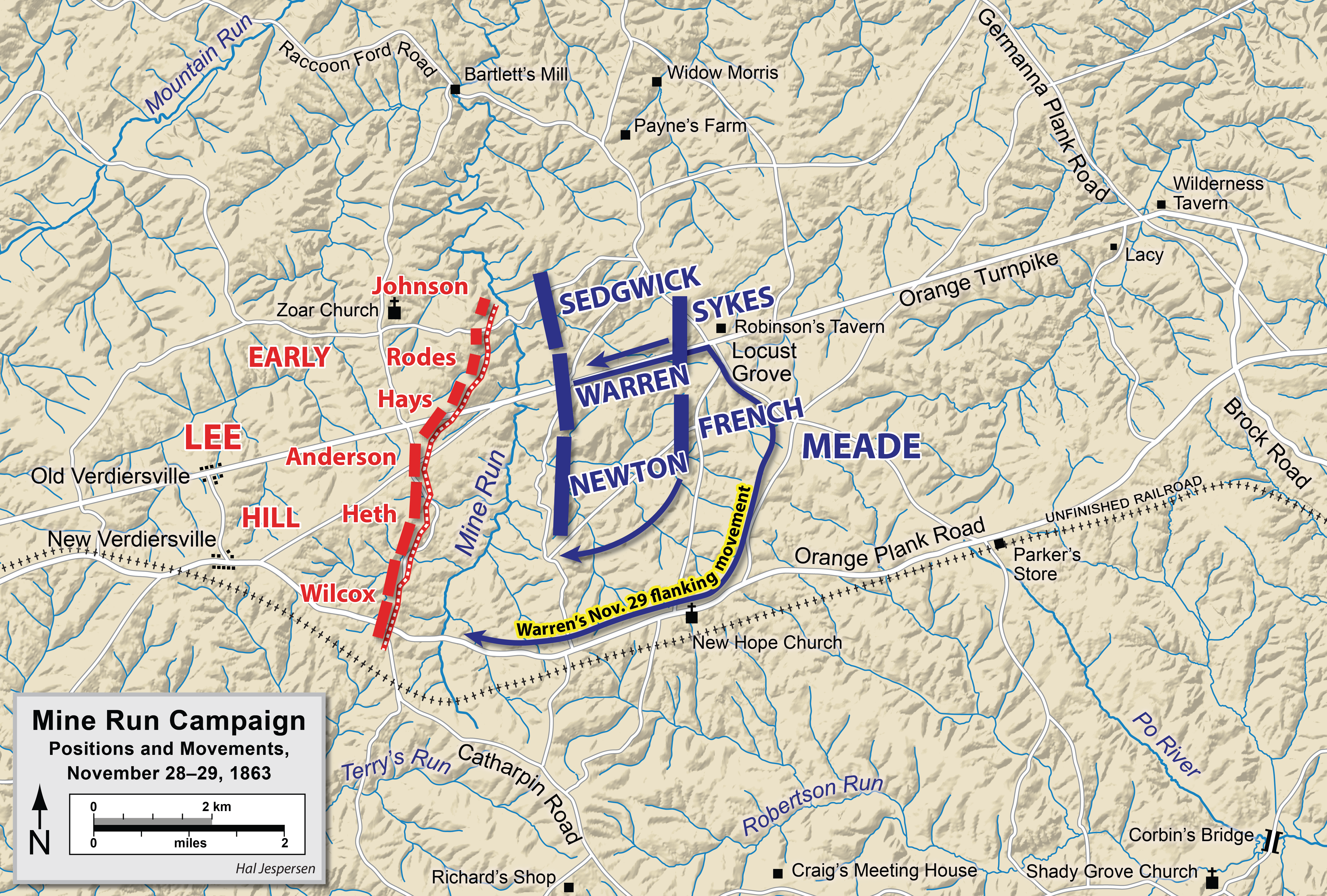
Opposing positions November 28 and Union corps movements November 29, 1863

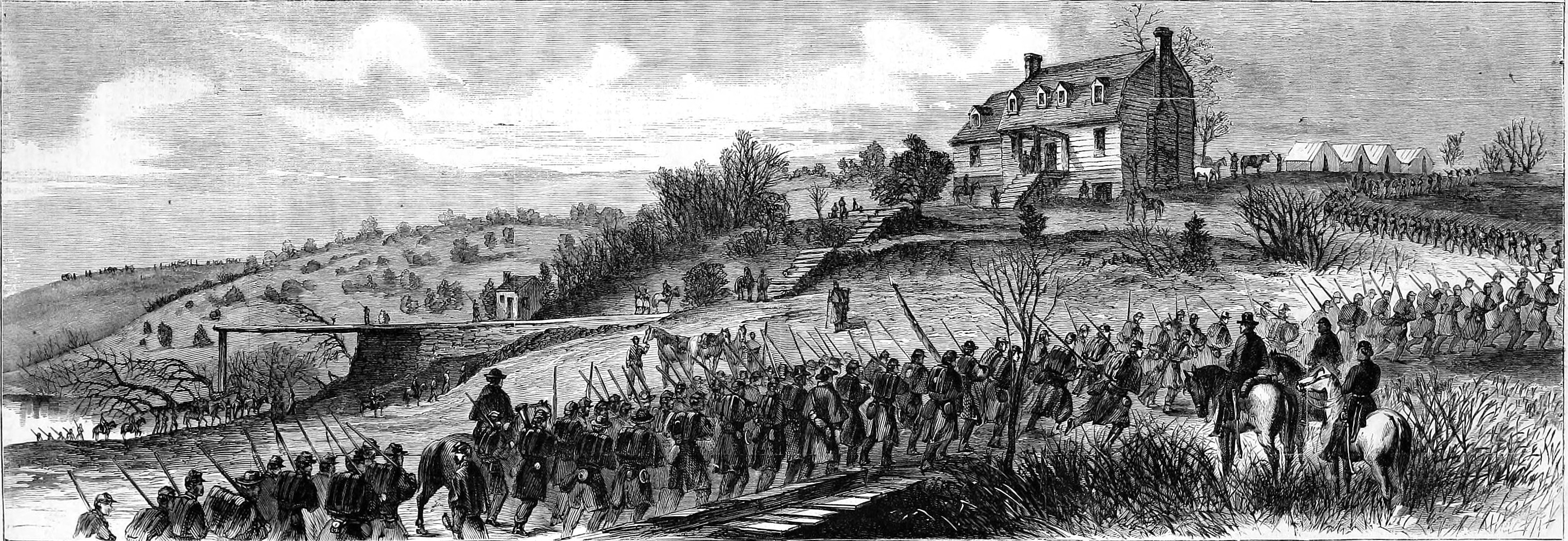
Troops crossing at Germanna Ford during the Mine Run campaign (from Harper's Weekly)

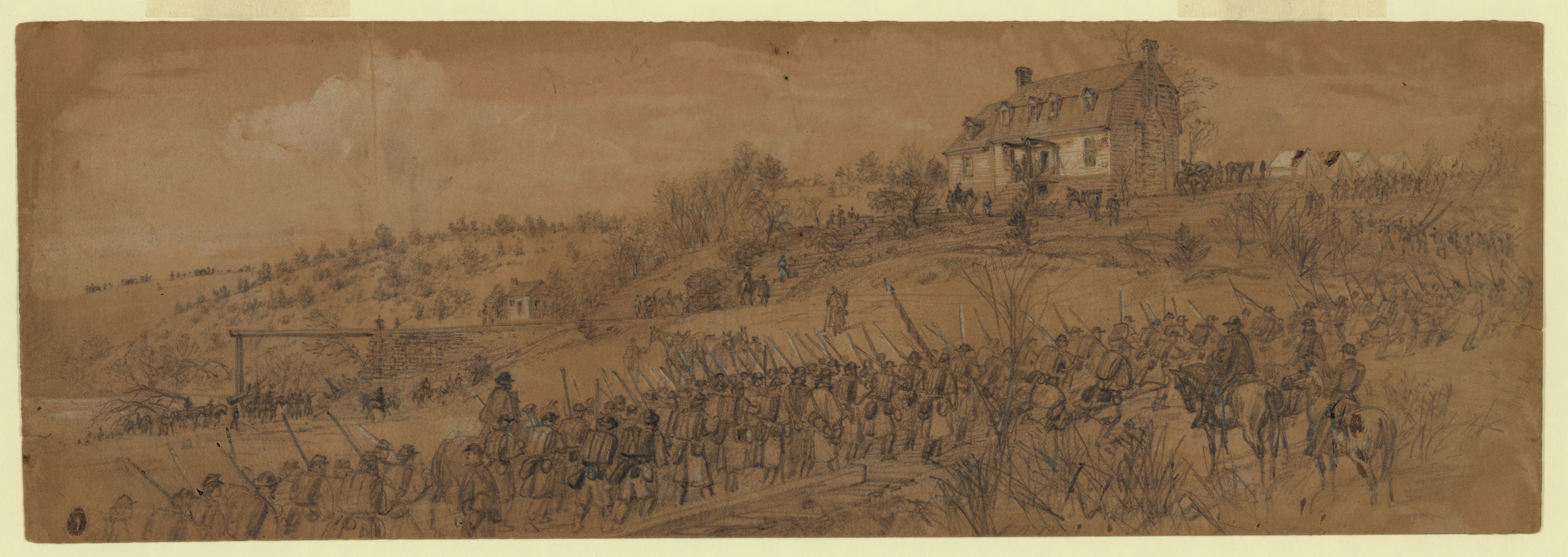
Scene at Germanna Ford - VI Corps returning from Mine Run, by Alfred Waud

After the Battle of Gettysburg in July, Confederate Gen. Robert E. Lee and his command retreated back across the Potomac River into Virginia. Union commander Maj. Gen. George G. Meade was widely criticized for failing to pursue aggressively and defeat Lee's army. Meade planned new offensives in Virginia for the fall. His first attempt was a series of inconclusive duels and maneuvers in October and November known as the Bristoe campaign.

In late November, Meade attempted to steal a march through the Wilderness of Spotsylvania and strike the right flank of the Confederate Army south of the Rapidan River. Meade had intelligence reports that Lee's army, half the size of Meade's Army of the Potomac (actually 48,000 to Meade's 81,000), was split in two, separated by Clark's Mountain, with the two flanks anchored at Mine Run and Liberty Mills, over thirty miles apart. His plan was to cross the Rapidan at points beyond Maj. Gen. J.E.B. Stuart's cavalry screen, overwhelm the right flank (Lt. Gen. Richard S. Ewell's Second Corps) and then follow up with the remainder (Lt. Gen. A.P. Hill's Third Corps).

Unlike Maj. Gen. Joseph Hooker's plan in the Chancellorsville campaign earlier that year on essentially the same ground, Meade planned no diversions; he intended a lightning strike with his entire army. The army marched on November 25 and got off to a good start, aided by fog on Clark's Mountain, which screened his movements from Confederate lookouts. However, Maj. Gen. William H. French's III Corps got mired in fording the river at Jacob's Ford, causing traffic jams when they moved their artillery to Germanna Ford, where other units were attempting to cross.

== Battle ==
Speed had escaped Meade, who was furious with French, and this allowed Lee time to react. Lee ordered Maj. Gen. Jubal A. Early, in temporary command of Ewell's Second Corps, to march east on the Orange Turnpike to Locust Grove, where Early's men began skirmishing with advance Union elements. Maj. Gen. Edward "Allegheny" Johnson's division was marching along the Raccoon Ford Road to join Early when the head of Gen. French's III Corps made contact in the heavy wooded terrain along the Widow Morris Road. Johnson turned his division about and ordered what can only be described as a reckless double-envelopment assault against a mostly unseen enemy of unknown strength, throwing his 5,500 men against French and John Sedgwick's VI Corps (a combined 32,000). It was about 3:45 - 4:00 p.m. Johnson's assault fell apart quickly on the left, where Steuart lost control of his brigade, and quickly bogged down in the middle (Stonewall Brigade) and on the right (Stafford and Jones), but was strong enough to slow down the Union advance until nightfall, when Johnson left the field on his own accord, retreating with the rest of the army west behind the Mine Run Creek. The actual fighting consumed less than two and one-half hours and the losses were heavy. Johnson lost nearly 550 men (or 10% of his strength) and French's corps about 950 from all causes. The Battle of Payne's Farm was short, bloody, and important. Johnson's attack put French and his III Corps back on its heels, slowed the advance, and saved Lee's army. If Johnson had cleared the Widow Morris Road before the arrival of French and Sedgwick, or had been driven away in defeat, the 32,000 Federals could have marched behind Lee's left flank and into his rear.

After dark, Lee withdrew to prepared field fortifications along Mine Run. The next day the Union Army closed on the Confederate position. Meade planned a heavy artillery bombardment followed by Maj. Gen. Gouverneur K. Warren's II Corps attack in the south, then Maj. Gen. John Sedgwick's VI Corps in the north an hour later. Lee planned an assault for December 2 that would have exploited the dangling left flank of the Union line, discovered the previous day by Maj. Gen. Wade Hampton's cavalry. Although the Union bombardment began on schedule, the major attack did not materialize; Meade concluded that the Confederate line was too strong to attack (although Warren is credited with getting the attack canceled) and retired during the night of December 1–2, ending the fall campaign. Lee was chagrined to find he had no one left in his front to attack.

== Aftermath ==
The Army of the Potomac went into winter quarters at Brandy Station, Virginia. Mine Run had been Meade's final opportunity to plan a strategic offensive before the arrival of Ulysses S. Grant as general-in-chief the following spring. Lee also regretted the inconclusive results. He was quoted as saying, "I am too old to command this army. We never should have permitted those people to get away." Confederate hopes of repeating their Chancellorsville triumph had been dashed. The Mine Run Campaign was Meade's last and failed attempt in 1863 to destroy Lee's Army of Northern Virginia before winter halted military operations. In the spring of 1864, Grant re-initiated battle with Lee in the Overland Campaign.

Henry Wadsworth Longfellow wrote the 1863 poem "Christmas Bells", which became the carol "I Heard the Bells on Christmas Day", in response to learning of his son Charles Appleton Longfellow being severely wounded in the battle.

== Battlefield preservation ==
Attorney, historian, and publisher Theodore P. Savas, who obtained the official records and other primary sources, was convinced that the few articles written on Payne's Farm had incorrectly located the fighting area and axis of the troops involved and was determined to test his theory. He contacted his friend Paul Sacra in Richmond, and the pair set out to locate and map the Payne's Farm battlefield in the late 1980s. Armed with extensive primary sources and battle reports, he and Sacra located what they believed was the field and, with the permission from several landowners, used metal detectors to prove it. Within a couple days Savas and Sacra had unearthed hundreds of artifacts, including bullets, a ramrod, bayonet socket, a partial harmonica behind the Louisiana position in the farm lane, belt buckles, buttons, and much more. Savas drew maps of the field and the general location of the artifacts and delivered them to The Association for the Preservation of Civil War Sites (or APCWS), and its director, A. Wilson Greene, in Fredericksburg, Virginia. Greene, who had no idea the field was in such pristine condition, was excited by the find and affirmed its importance.

Saving the land was a slow process for a variety of reasons, including the fact that the majority landowner wanted to develop the land. At that point Savas and Sacra presented him with proof that the land contained at least two mass graves (which they had not detected or recovered anything from), and that to develop the land for homes would be a travesty. The Civil War Trust (a division of the American Battlefield Trust) and its partners later acquired and preserved 690 acres (2.8 km^{2}) of the battlefield. The battlefield today features a wooded, 1.5-mile interpretive trail with historical wayside markers. It is located on Virginia highway 611 across from the Zoar Baptist Church about two miles north of Locust Grove.
