= CSS Livingston =

1862 Confederate States Navy steamer

History

Confederate States
- Name: Livingston
- Owner: Confederate States Navy
- Launched: January 1862
- Commissioned: January 1862
- Fate: Burned to prevent capture, 26 June 1862

General characteristics
- Type: Sidewheel steamer
- Length: 180 ft (55 m)
- Beam: 40 ft (12 m) or 42 feet (13 m)
- Depth of hold: 9 ft 6 in (2.90 m) or 9 feet (2.7 m)
- Speed: Slow
- Armament: two 30-pounders, four shell guns

CSS Livingston was a sidewheel steamer operated by the Confederate States Navy during the American Civil War. Livingston was acquired by the Confederacy in 1861 and was converted from a civilian vessel by John Hughes & Company into a warship. Mounting six cannons, the vessel was slow and had a particularly wide beam for its size. Sent up the Mississippi River in 1862, Livingston was part of the Confederate fleet at Columbus, Kentucky, and New Madrid, Missouri, before the abandonment of those places and assisted in the evacuation of a Confederate fort at New Madrid. Livingston's guns were removed and added to the shore defenses at Fort Randolph in early May. After the Confederates withdrew from Fort Pillow in early June 1862, Livingston went up the Yazoo River with CSS General Polk. On June 26, Livingston, General Polk, and CSS General Earl Van Dorn were all burned at Liverpool Landing, Mississippi, to prevent their capture by Union forces.

== Service history ==
According to the Dictionary of American Naval Fighting Ships (DANFS), Livingston was built at New Orleans, Louisiana, in 1861 as either a ferryboat or a towboat, while Way's Packet Directory identifies her as a Berwick Bay ferry which existed prior to the American Civil War. The naval historian Donald L. Canney reports that Livingston was still under construction as either a ferry or tugboat at the outbreak of the war at the John Hughes & Company shipyard along Bayou St. John. A sidewheel steamer, the DANFS gives dimensions for Livingston as 180 feet (55 m) in length, a beam of 40 feet (12 m), and a depth of hold of 9 feet 6 inches (2.90 m). Way's Packet Directory agrees with these length and beam measurements, but gives a depth of hold of 9 feet (2.7 m). Canney agrees with the DANFS's length and depth of hold measurements, but provides a beam measurement of 42 feet (13 m) excluding the width of the housings for the paddle wheels.

In June 1861, Hughes approached the Confederate authorities with a proposal to convert Livingston into a gunboat. This was accepted with a contract price of $42,000 by Confederate Flag Officer Lawrence Rousseau on June 28. The conversion eventually cost an additional $80,000. Her hull was made of a mixture of cypress, white oak, and yellow pine, with the thickness of the planking being 3.5 inches (8.9 cm) at the keel, increasing to 6 inches (15 cm) further up. Livingston had a rudder on each end of the ship, and a berth deck was added for crew housing. The vessel had a particularly wide beam for its size. Hughes's plan called for 70 feet (21 m) of open deck space at either end of the ship, with two pivot guns each on the decks at the bow and stern ends of the vessel, along with a total of six broadside guns. Her actual armament was two 30-pounder guns and four shell guns according to Canney. In service, she was a rather slow vessel. One Confederate who served on Livingston wrote describing the vessel: "There had also been built (from designs by a locomotive roundhouse architect, I suppose) the most wonderful contraption that was ever seen afloat, called the Livingston; she carried 6 guns, 3 for'd and 3 abaft the paddle boxes, and she was almost circular in shape. She was so slow that her crew facetiously complained that when she was going downstream at full speed they could not sleep on account of the drift logs catching up with her and bumping against the stern."

Launched by at least January 1862, she was commissioned later that month under the command of First Lieutenant Francis B. Renshaw. Livingston was sent up the Mississippi River and by late February was part of the Confederate fleet at Columbus, Kentucky. The Confederates abandoned Columbus in early March, and the naval ships withdrew downriver to New Madrid, Missouri. In mid-March, some of the Confederate vessels were used to evacuate forts at New Madrid which were threatened by Union positions; along with CSS General Polk and the transport Louisville, Livingston evacuated supplies, soldiers, and ammunition from Fort Thompson on the night of March 13/14. Livingston towed a floating hospital downriver to Tiptonville, Tennessee, as well. The garrison at Island No. 10 surrendered on April 8, and the Confederate fleet withdrew to Fort Pillow.

This Confederate naval force had been under the command of Commodore George N. Hollins, who left the upper Mississippi in early April to take command at New Orleans, which was expecting a Union attack. Command temporarily fell to First Lieutenant Thomas Huger, before Commander Robert Pinckney took command. Pinckney made Livingston his flagship, before relocating Livingston and General Polk downriver to Memphis, Tennessee. In early May, the cannons from Livingston and General Polk were removed from the ships and used as part of the shore defenses near Fort Randolph. After the Confederates abandoned Fort Pillow in early June, Pinckney ordered General Polk and Livingston to withdraw up the Yazoo River. Of the guns put ashore at Fort Randolph, only two from General Polk were retrieved by the ships before the retreat. On the Yazoo River, Pinckney commanded Livingston, General Polk, and CSS General Earl Van Dorn at Liverpool Landing, Mississippi; General Earl Van Dorn had been the only Confederate warship to escape after the First Battle of Memphis.

At Liverpool Landing, the ships served as a sort of guard for the construction of the ironclad CSS Arkansas, which was happening further up the Yazoo. A log obstruction was emplaced across the river at Liverpool Landing, and the two guns on General Polk were put into a shore battery. Pinckney intended to use the three warships as naval rams if Union ships approached. On June 26, with two Union rams moving up the Yazoo, Pinckney had the three ships at Liverpool Landing burned to prevent their capture; Arkansas was moving down the Yazoo at this time but did not arrive at Liverpool Landing until it was too late.

== Sources ==
- Canney, Donald L. (2015). The Confederate Steam Navy 1861–1865. Atglen, Pennsylvania: Schiffer. ISBN 978-0-7643-4824-2.
- Chatelain, Neil P. (2020). Defending the Arteries of Rebellion: Confederate Naval Operations in the Mississippi River Valley, 1861–1865. El Dorado Hills, California: Savas Beatie. ISBN 978-1-61121-510-6.
- McCaul, Edward B. Jr (2014). To Retain Command of the Mississippi: The Civil War Naval Campaign for Memphis. Knoxville, Tennessee: University of Tennessee Press. ISBN 978-1-62190-135-8.
- Way, Frederick (1994). Way's Packet Directory, 1848–1994: Passenger Steamboats of the Mississippi River System Since the Advent of Photography in Mid-Continent America. Athens, Ohio: Ohio University. ISBN 0821411063.
