= Kenneth D. Alford =

American non-fiction writer

- Born: Raleigh NC
- Occupation: non-fiction writer
- Spouse: Edda Alford

Kenneth D. Alford is an American non-fiction writer who specializes in books about the looting of art by German and Allied forces during World War II. He has also written about lost treasures from the Civil War.

He was born in Raleigh, North Carolina. He has two brothers. He married Edda Alford after meeting her while stationed in Germany.

Before retiring, Alford was in the United States Army. He was stationed in Germany where he learned computer coding using punch cards. When honorably discharged he returned to the States and moved to Virginia. His day job was writing codes for banks. He played a large part in fixing the Y 2 K bank coding.

== Selected publications ==
- Spoils of World War II. Birch Lane Press, 1995. ISBN 978-1559722377
- Nazi Millionaires: The Cold War Winners. Greenhill Books, 2002. ISBN 978-1853675195
- Nazi Plunder. Da Capo Press, 2003. ISBN 9780306812415 (with Theodore P. Savas)
- Civil War Museum Treasures: Outstanding Artifacts and the Stories Behind Them. McFarland, Jefferson, 2008. ISBN 978-0786431861
- Allied Looting in World War II: Thefts of Art, Manuscripts, Stamps and Jewelry in Europe. McFarland, Jefferson, 2011. ISBN 978-0786460533
- Hermann Goring and the Nazi Art Collection: The Looting of Europe's Art Treasures and Their Dispersal After World War II. McFarland, Jefferson, 2012. ISBN 9780786489558
- Sacking Aladdin’s Cave: Plundering Göring’s Nazi War Trophies. Schiffer, Atglen, 2013. ISBN 9780764343964 (With Thomas M. Johnson and Mike F. Morris)
