= CSS General Polk =

Confederate warship

History

Confederate States
- Name: General Polk
- Namesake: Leonidas Polk
- Builder: New Albany, Indiana
- Launched: 1852
- Acquired: 1861
- Commissioned: October 22, 1861
- Fate: Burned to prevent capture, June 26, 1862

General characteristics
- Class & type: Sidewheel steamer
- Tonnage: 390 tons
- Length: 280 ft (85.3 m)
- Beam: 35 ft (10.7 m)
- Draught: Less than 4 ft (1.2 m)
- Armament: 2 × rifled 32-pounder gun; 1 × smoothbore 32-pounder gun
- Armour: Iron bars on bow and stern

CSS General Polk was a sidewheel steamer used as a warship by the Confederate States Navy during the American Civil War. launched in 1852 at New Albany, Indiana, as Ed Howard, the vessel was originally a packet steamer between Nashville, Tennessee, and New Orleans, Louisiana. After the outbreak of the war, the Confederate government purchased her for $8,000. She was commissioned into military service on October 22, 1861, and sent to Columbus, Kentucky the following month. On January 11, 1862, General Polk participated in the Battle of Lucas Bend. After the Confederates abandoned Columbus, General Polk served in the Island No. 10 and New Madrid, Missouri, area, until those positions as well fell. She was then stationed at Fort Pillow and Memphis, Tennessee, before withdrawing up the Yazoo River. On June 26, General Polk was burned at Liverpool Landing, Mississippi, along with two other Confederate ships, to prevent their capture by Union forces.

== Service history ==
In 1852, the sidewheel steamer Ed Howard was launched at New Albany, Indiana. She was 280 feet (85 m) long and had a beam of 35 feet (11 m), along with a draft of less than 6 feet (2 m). She had a tonnage of 390 tons. She was a packet steamer between Nashville, Tennessee, and New Orleans, Louisiana. On March 7, 1856, she sank the steamboat Henry Lewis in an accidental collision. In a separate incident on January 26, 1853, she had collided with and sank the steamboat Swallow at Bonnet Carré, Louisiana. In 1860, her master was J. W. Fowler. With the formation of the Confederate States of America and the outbreak of the American Civil War in 1861, the Confederacy began the task of creating a navy from scratch. The Ed Howard was at New Orleans in 1861, and was purchased by the Confederate government, for $8,000 by Commodore George N. Hollins. Confederate general Leonidas Polk desired the vessel for use on the upper portion of Confederate control on the Mississippi River, and Ed Howard was in turned named General Polk after him. Polk requested and received the assignment of First Lieutenant Jonathan H. Carter to command of the vessel, which was a gunboat. The vessel was also known solely as Polk.

The work to convert General Polk from a civilian steamship into a warship took place at Algiers, Louisiana. Part of the labor requirements were met by leasing slave labor, and over $9,000 of materials were required to complete the conversion, which was slowed by rainy weather. The bow and stern of the ship were armored with iron bars. A total of 77,305 pounds (35,065 kg) of iron was ordered by Carter for use on General Polk. Part of her superstructure and passenger spaces were removed during the conversion. Carter wanted General Polk to be armed with true rifled cannon, but none were available so the Confederate authorities converted old smoothbore 32-pounder guns into rifled pieces. While her initial armament was two rifled 32-pounders and a smoothbore 32-pounder, at various points during her military service, the armament varied between three and seven cannons. Upon conversion, she had a draft of less than 4 feet (1.2 m). Between the cost of purchase, conversion, and repairs, General Polk cost the Confederacy $60,459.99. General Polk was re-launched by the end of September and was commissioned on October 22. On November 10 she left New Orleans for Columbus, Kentucky, which had been occupied by Polk's Confederate army forces. She arrived there on November 20. On November 30, General Polk, along with two other Confederate gunboats, met the approach of three Union vessels and followed them back towards Fort Holt. January 11, 1862, saw General Polk and three other Confederate vessels skirmish with two Union ironclads in the Battle of Lucas Bend. The Confederate vessels had moved upriver for reconnaissance purposes, when the ironclads sighted a Confederate ship that was, according to the naval historian Neil Chatelain, likely General Polk. The two sides fired on each other for about 20 minutes until the Confederates withdrew downriver.

In early March 1862, the Confederates abandoned Columbus. The naval forces at Columbus, under the command of Hollins, withdrew to New Madrid, Missouri. Union troops captured Point Pleasant, Missouri, on March 6, and began establishing an artillery position there. General Polk and the gunboat CSS Pontchartrain fired on the position at Point Pleasant on March 7, but were unable to silence it. Further Confederate attempts to silence the guns through March 9 also failed. On March 13, Union forces opened fire on the Confederate positions at New Madrid with heavy artillery. General Polk was struck by four shots, and the Confederates decided to withdraw. General Polk and the gunboat CSS Livingston escorted a transport for the evacuation of one of the Confederate defensive positions, Fort Thompson. On March 18, General Polk joined five other Confederate ships in a failed attempt to silence a Union battery that had taken up a position across the Mississippi River from Tiptonville, Tennessee, at Riddle's Point. General Polk was hit by a Union shot that passed all the way through the vessel, with the exit hole being below the waterline. The damage caused the ship to have to be withdrawn from the fighting. General Polk was intentionally run aground by the Confederates to prevent her from sinking.

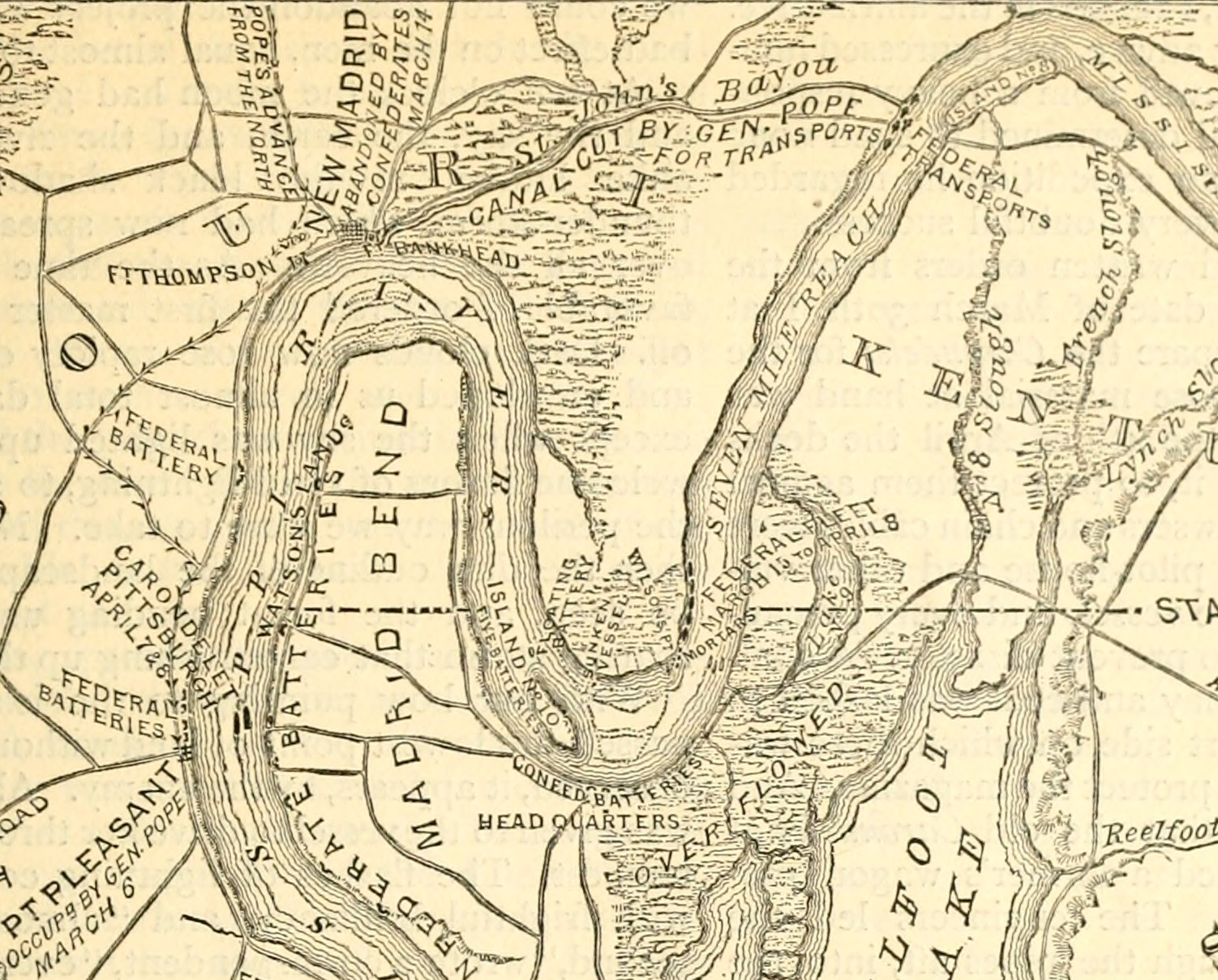
Map of the Island No. 10, New Madrid, and Point Pleasant areas

Hollins used his ships to transport supplies to the Confederate troops defending Island No. 10, even though the ships now had to pass the Union positions at Riddle's Point and Point Pleasant. Early on the morning of April 8, the Confederates surrendered Island No. 10, and the Confederate fleet withdrew to Fort Pillow in Tennessee. Hollins received information on April 9 that New Orleans was threatened by a Union fleet, and he left for that city. First Lieutenant Thomas Huger commanded the Confederate vessels until Commander Robert Pickney could arrive. On April 13, Huger led an abortive attack against the Union fleet near Fort Pillow. The attempt was made by General Polk, three vessels of the River Defense Fleet, and four other Confederate gunboats. Late on April 12, a Confederate scouting mission had been informed that the Union forces planned an attack for the next day. Huger decided to launch a surprise attack early on April 13 before the Union could strike, but when the Confederate ships sighted the Union fleet and saw that it was prepared for combat, they withdrew. While in the Fort Pillow area, General Polk's guns were offloaded for use in Fort Randolph. Pickney took command later that month, and General Polk and Livingston were sent down to Memphis, Tennessee, for refitting.

The fall of Corinth, Mississippi, led the Confederates to abandon Fort Pillow in early June, and Pickney ordered the Confederate warships to scatter into the various tributaries of the Mississippi River. Only two of General Polk's guns at Fort Randolph were retrieved before the evacuation of the area. General Polk and Livingston ended up on the Yazoo River, where they were joined by the cottonclad CSS General Earl Van Dorn, the only River Defense Fleet ship to survive the First Battle of Memphis in Confederate hands. The three vessels defended the Yazoo River at Liverpool Landing, Mississippi, while the ironclad CSS Arkansas was being completed upriver. General Polk's two guns were again offloaded and emplaced in a shore position. On June 26, two Union ships, the rams USS Monarch and USS Lancaster, moved up the Yazoo River. Pickney ordered General Polk, General Earl Van Dorn, and Livingston burned at Liverpool Landing to prevent them from falling into Union hands. Arkansas was on a test run down the Yazoo River when the burning occurred, but by the time the ironclad arrived, the vessels had been destroyed. The wreck was removed by the United States Army Corps of Engineers in 1878 and 1879.

== Sources ==
- Canney, Donald L. (2015). The Confederate Steam Navy 1861–1865. Atglen, Pennsylvania: Schiffer. ISBN 978-0-7643-4824-2.
- Chatelain, Neil P. (2020). Defending the Arteries of Rebellion: Confederate Naval Operations in the Mississippi River Valley, 1861–1865. El Dorado Hills, California: Savas Beatie. ISBN 978-1-61121-510-6.
- Daniel, Larry J.; Bock, Lynn N. (1996). Island No. 10: Struggle for the Mississippi Valley. Tuscaloosa, Alabama: University of Alabama Press. ISBN 0-8173-0816-4.
- Gaines, W. Craig (2008). Encyclopedia of Civil War Shipwrecks. Baton Rouge, Louisiana: Louisiana State University Press. ISBN 978-0-8071-3274-6.
- Jones, Robert A. (2000). Confederate Corsair: The Life of Lt. Charles W. "Savez" Read. Mechanicsburg, Pennsylvania: Stackpole Books. ISBN 0-8117-1532-9.
- Official Records of the Union and Confederate Navies in the War of the Rebellion, Series 2. U. S. Naval War Records Office. Office memoranda. Vol. 1. Washington, D.C.: Government Printing Office. 1921.
- Silverstone, Paul H. (1989). Warships of the Civil War Navies. Annapolis, Maryland: Naval Institute Press. ISBN 0-87021-783-6.
- Way, Frederick (1994). Way's Packet Directory, 1848–1994: Passenger Steamboats of the Mississippi River System Since the Advent of Photography in Mid-Continent America. Athens, Ohio: Ohio University. ISBN 0821411063.
