= Liverpool, Mississippi =

- Ghost town
- Location within the state of Mississippi
- Coordinates: 32°42′47″N 90°30′05″W
- Country: United States
- State: Mississippi
- County: Yazoo
- Elevation: 328 ft (100 m)
- Time zone: UTC-6 (Central (CST))
  - Summer (DST): UTC-5 (CDT)
- GNIS feature ID: 686677

Liverpool is a ghost town in Yazoo County, Mississippi, United States. Liverpool Landing, the settlement's port on the Yazoo River, was located 0.9 mi (1.4 km) west of Liverpool.

Liverpool Road runs through the former settlement, and Mississippi Highway 3 runs between the former settlement and its river landing.

== History ==
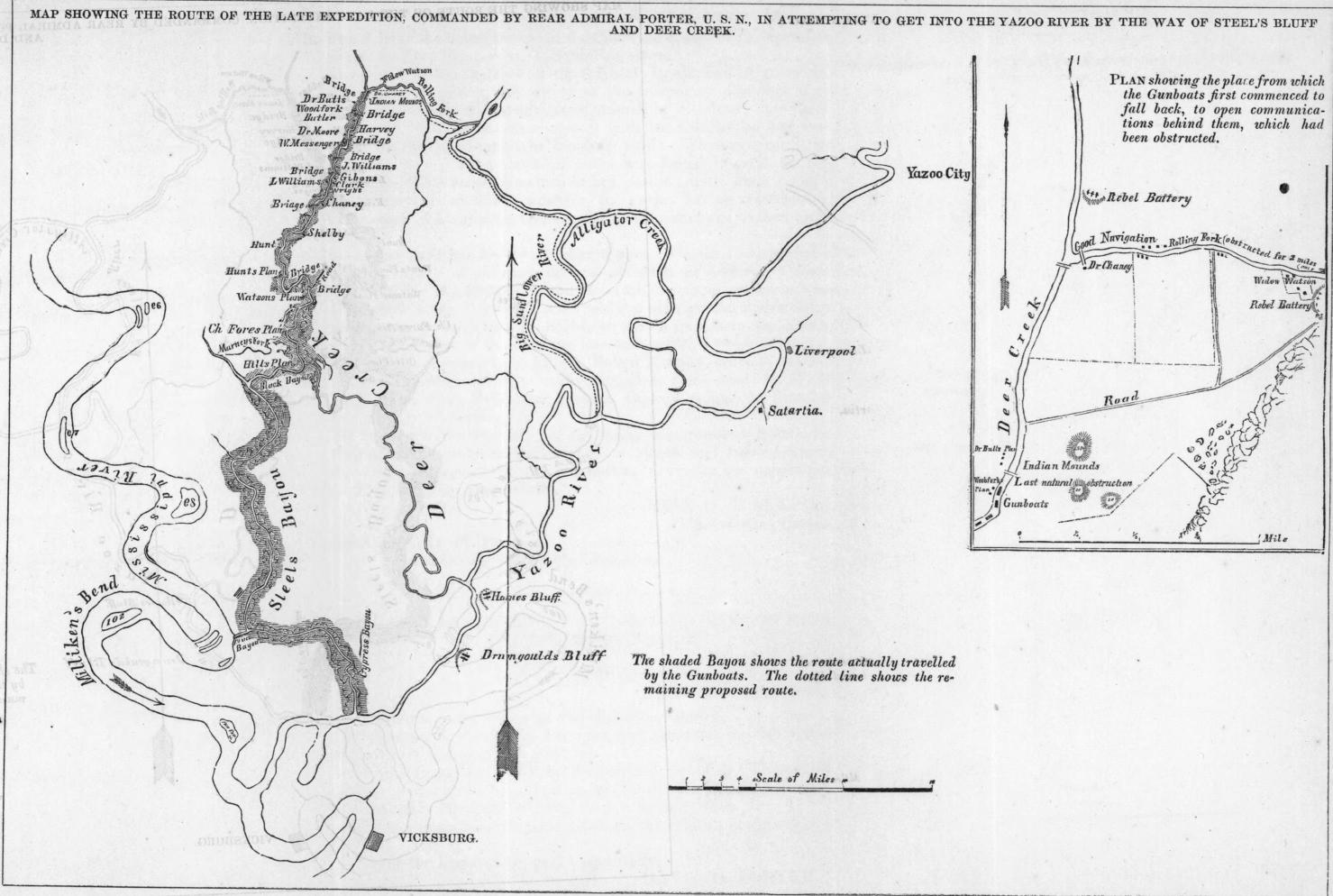
Map from 1863 showing Liverpool

During the early and mid-1800s, Liverpool Landing was "the hub of a bustling community, a steamboat stop and a shipping point for cotton".

During the American Civil War, Liverpool Landing's location at a bend in the Yazoo River made it an important defensive location for Confederate Army forces. Rugged, brush-covered hills rose abruptly on the eastern bank of the river, and one hill named "Rudloff Ridge" was selected for a defensive position.

In June 1862, Confederate forces constructed a log chain raft across the Yazoo River at Liverpool Landing, in order to obstruct the movement of large Union Army ships. The New York Times described the raft as "a perfect lock against ascending boats". The Confederate vessels Arkansas, General Clark, General Earl Van Dorn, Livingston, Mobile, and Polk were sent to defend the raft.

Another notable river battle occurred at Liverpool Landing from May 20 to 23, 1863, when Confederate commander William Wirt Adams engaged Federal Army gunboats there.

The Confederate vessels Ivy and Capitol were scuttled at Liverpool Landing in an effort to obstruct the river.

Liverpool and Liverpool Landing declined following the Civil War, when railroads largely replaced riverboat traffic.

The Liverpool Baptist Church and Cemetery is still located at the former settlement.
