= Nanna Hubba Bluff =

Archaeological site in Alabama, United States

- U.S. National Register of Historic Places
- Location within Alabama Location within the United States
- Nearest city: Calvert, Alabama
- Coordinates: 31°9′25″N 87°58′34″W
- Area: 153 acres (62 ha)
- NRHP reference No.: 74000430
- Added to NRHP: October 1, 1974

Nanna Hubba Bluff is a bluff above the Tombigbee River near Calvert in northeastern Mobile County, Alabama, United States. The historic site is known to have been occupied by Native Americans at least as far back as 1000 BC, but gained its name from the historic-era Nanibas tribe. The Nanibas (‘fish-eaters’) are believed by scholars to have been a Choctaw people. They occupied a village here during the early 18th century, until they moved downstream to the vicinity of Fort Louis de la Mobile and were absorbed into the Mobile tribe. Following the relocation of the Nanibas, the bluff came to be settled by early European settlers. During the American Civil War the Confederacy had shipyards at the site. It was added to the National Register of Historic Places on October 1, 1974, due to its historical importance. Nanna Hubba Bluff was acquired by ThyssenKrupp in 2007, with the company building a new US$4.65 billion stainless and carbon steel facility on the site.
