= Theodore P. Savas =

American publisher

- Born: Mason City, Iowa, United States
- Education: BA, JD
- Alma mater: University of Northern Iowa, The University of Iowa College of Law
- Occupations: Attorney, publisher, author, Entrepreneur
- Known for: Savas Beatie, LLC

Theodore P. Savas worked an attorney for many years, was a former adjunct college instructor, and is an entrepreneur, author, and publisher. He is the co-founder and majority partner of Savas Beatie, an independent book trade publishing company that specializes in military and general history, and especially the American Civil War. He writes and speaks about Civil War topics, as well as the American Revolutionary War, and WWII German U-boats.

== Background ==
Savas was born and raised on the Northern Plains in Iowa. He graduated from North Iowa Area Community College (NIACC) in 1979, A.A. degree, and from the University of Northern Iowa (UNI) in 1981, B.A. History. He received his teaching credentials. After working on his Master's in American History, he entered The University of Iowa College of Law in 1983 and graduated in 1986 (with Distinction).

== Career and personal life ==
Savas practiced law in Silicon Valley for twelve years before becoming a full-time publisher and writer. In 1990, he and David A. Woodbury started the publishing company Regimental Studies, Inc., which became Savas Woodbury Publishers. Savas and Woodbury co-founded the quarterly journal Civil War Regiments, which produced 25 quarterly issues. Savas Woodbury became Savas Publishing in 1995, after which Savas added the Journal of the Indian Wars, which published five issues. In 2000-2001, Savas Publishing was sold into a merger deal with Combined Publishing of Conshohocken, PA, and Perseus Books Group of Boston and NY.

From 1992 until 2009, Savas taught legal, historical, political, and business-related college classes as an adjunct lecturer in the Bay Area and Sacramento region. Savas and the late New York-based attorney Russell H. Beatie founded the military publishing house Savas Beatie LLC in 2004, with Savas serving as its managing director in El Dorado Hills, CA.

Savas also founded (with David Woodbury) The South Bay Civil War Roundtable in San Jose, California in 1989. That same year, Savas reached the conclusion that modern sources had improperly located the Civil War battlefield of Payne's Farm (part of the late Fall 1863 Mine Run Campaign), in Orange County, Virginia, and that the units involved were grossly ill-positioned. The accidental battle was especially important because the sharp bloody fighting alerted General Robert E. Lee of the risk to his left-rear and prevented two Union infantry corps from turning his flank on November 27, 1863. After the battle, Lee fell back west behind his Mine Run entrenchments.

After visiting the general location in person, he enlisted friend Paul Sacra of Richmond, Virginia, to help him map the field. Sacra knew the major landowner in the area, who allowed them full access. Together, with metal detectors and notebooks in hand, they mapped the outlines of the field, located more than 1,000 relics, and tracked the archaeology and unit positions with precision.

Savas turned the maps and information over to a Fredericksburg-based preservation organization. He published articles on the battle and its importance and began lecturing across the country on the topic. This, in turn, prompted increased interest in both the battle and the battlefield (which is one of the most pristine in the country). The landowner was going to develop the land, but when confronted with the fact that at least two mass graves were on the property, as well as several single graves that had been lost, he thankfully changed his mind. At the urging of Savas and Sacra, the land was eventually purchased, preserved and interpreted. Both men routinely lead tours of the nearly pristine battlefield.

While researching George W. Rains and the Augusta Powder Works, a large munitions factory that played a pivotal role in the Civil War, Ted was looking for Rains's Civil War diaries in the Augusta History Museum in 1990. No diaries were found, but he discovered dozens of oversize original hand-colored blueprints/color plates of the entire powder works complex inside large drawers on an upper floor. The museum director professed to not know much if anything about them. When informed they were long missing, only a few had ever been seen, and they were a priceless Confederate historical treasure ("the Rosetta Stone of Confederate industrial history"), the museum preserved them. At the insistence of Gordon Blaker and Chip Bragg, they were used as the centerpiece of the award-winning 2007 book Never for Want of Powder: The Confederate Powder Works in Augusta, Georgia, with co-authors C. L. Bragg, Gordon A. Blaker, Charles D. Ross, and Stephanie A. T. Jacobe (University of South Carolina Press, 2007).

Ted has finished his four-decade effort on Rains and his book The Indispensable Man: George Washington Rains, the Confederate Powder Works, and the Civil War You Never Knew will appear in the autumn of 2026.

Savas was part of Clive Cussler's expedition in 1994-1995 that found the Confederate submarine CSS Hunley off Charleston, South Carolina.

In addition to writing articles on a variety of historical topics he penned a regular column for a local newspaper for many years in the Sacramento region. Savas has written, edited, or co-authored more than a dozen books (published in many languages), and has ghostwritten nearly forty others for authors, publishers, and agents.

He is a regular guest on podcasts, online forum presentations, and in-person lectures, and offers the occasional online series of classes called Write NOW! to help aspiring and veteran authors get on track, stay on track, and negotiate the gears and machinery of the publishing world.

Ted is also a musician. He was trained in classical piano and, beginning as a teenager, played keyboards in several Midwest rock bands (Lyra, Wethersfield Road, and Abalone) and took up the Rickenbacker bass in 1976 after seeing Geddy Lee and the band RUSH. Ted was in the touring band Disciple from 1980-1981 with his brother Anthony on guitar. Although music was his passion, in the summer of 1981 he reluctantly decided to set it aside to further his studies and enter law school.

In 2014, he and his brother (both living in California since the mid-80s) founded the rock band Arminius in the Sacramento region. Arminius has garnered significant local success opening for a variety of major acts including Pat Travers, Hooker's & Blow (with members from Slash and Guns 'N Roses), Last in Line (with members from Dio, Def Leppard, Black Sabbath, and Ozzy Osbourne), The Bullet Boys, The Iron Maidens, and many others. The current and longest-serving lineup includes Rob Mauer (lead guitar), Anthony Savas (lead guitar), Vinny Scola (vocals), Donovan Campbell (drums), and Ted Savas (bass, occasional keyboards, and vocals). Arminius has recorded a number of original songs that can be heard on Youtube and continues to play reunion shows on the West Coast.

Ted's rig is simple: two 4003 Rickenbacker bass guitars (Fireglo and Natural) played through a pair of acoustic bottoms (1x15-inch cab and one with 4x10s), powered by a 1001RB Gallien Krueger head.

Ted and his wife Zoe enjoy traveling to new places and scuba diving together. In 2023, they loaded up their Conestoga wagon and rolled east from California to Myrtle Beach, South Carolina, where they built their own home near the water. He has two grown children (Alex and DT), two grown stepsons (Justin and Zach), three dogs, and a well-stocked humidor and wet bar in his full-size library for his many friends.

== Books ==
- Savas, Theodore (1993) The Campaign for Atlanta & Sherman's March to the Sea vol. 1., with David A. Woodbury, ed.
- Savas (1994) The Campaign for Atlanta & Sherman's March to the Sea vol. 2., with David A. Woodbury, ed.
- Savas (1994) The Campaign for Atlanta & Sherman's March to the Sea vols. 1-2 (combined)., with David A. Woodbury, ed.
- Savas (1996) Blood on the Rappahannock: The Battle of Fredericksburg (Civil War Regiments: A Journal of the American Civil War, Volume 4, No. 4)
- Savas (1997, 2003) Silent Hunters: German U-boat Commanders of World War II
- Savas (1997) Charleston : Battles and Seacoast Operations in South Carolina, Civil War Regiments: A Journal of the American Civil War, Volume 5, No. 2)
- Savas (2000) Chickamauga & Chattanooga: Battles for the Confederate Heartland. (Civil War Regiments: A Journal of the American Civil War, Volume 7, No 1)
- Savas (2002) Nazi Millionaires: The Allied Search for Hidden SS Gold, with co-author Kenneth D. Alford
- Savas (2004) Hunt and Kill: U-505 and the U-Boat War in the Atlantic, editor
- Savas (2006) A Guide to the Battles of the American Revolution, with co-author J. David Dameron
- Savas (2007) Never for Want of Powder: The Confederate Powder Works in Augusta, Georgia, with co-authors C. L. Bragg, Gordon A. Blaker, Charles D. Ross, and Stephanie A. T. Jacobe
- Savas (2008) Brady's Civil War Journal: Photographing the War 1861-1865 Skyhorse Publishing.
- Savas (2010) The New American Revolution Handbook: Facts and Artwork for Readers of all Ages, 1775-1783, with co-author J. David Dameron
- Savas (2026) The Indispensable Man: George Washington Rains, the Confederate Powder Works, and the Civil War You Never Knew

== Articles ==
- Savas (2018) "AN ELEGANT GAME: The A Dying Southern Diarist, the Civil War, and his Fascination with Chess," in American Chess Magazine (Aug. 1, 2018).
- Savas (2017) "The War's Biggest Blunder: Sherman and the Bypassing of Augusta on the March to the Sea," in Civil War Times Magazine (Aug. 1, 2017).
- Savas (2017) "The Heart of the Confederate War Machine: The Augusta Powder Works," in Civil War Times Magazine (June 1, 2017).
- Savas (2016) "The Business of History Books: An Interview with Theodore P. Savas" in The Civil War Monitor (July 2016).
- Savas (1999) "Gauntlet of Fire: The USS Wyoming in the Shimonoseki Straits," in Naval History Magazine (Feb. 1, 1999).
- Savas (1992)"The Battle of Payne's Farm, Nov. 27, 1863," in Civil War: The Magazine of the Civil War Society (May 1, 1992).
- Savas (1991) "Bulwark of the Beleaguered Confederacy: The Augusta Powder Works," in Civil War: The Magazine of the Civil War Society (Sept. 1, 1991).
- Savas (1991) "Foraging South of the James River: The Suffolk Campaign," in Confederate Veteran Magazine (March 1, 1991).
- Savas (1990) "Longstreet Takes Command: The Suffolk Campaign," America's Civil War (March 1, 1990).
- Savas (1989) "Last Clash of the Ironclads: The Bungled Affair in Trent's Reach," in Civil War: The Magazine of the Civil War Society (Jan. 1, 1989)
- Savas (1988) Ironclads on the James River: The Battle of Trent's Reach," in Confederate Veteran Magazine (Nov. 1, 1988).

== Awards ==
- A Guide to the Battles of the American Revolution: Winner, 2006, Gold Star Book Award for History, Military Writers Society of America. A selection of the History and Military book clubs.
- The New American Revolution Handbook: Winner, Reference, 2010 Army Historical Foundation Distinguished Book Award
- Never for Want of Powder: The Confederate Powder Works in Augusta, Georgia, with co-authors C. L. Bragg, Gordon A. Blaker, Charles D. Ross, and Stephanie A. T. Jacobe): Winner 2007 Lilla M. Hawes Award, Georgia Historical Society.
- The Iron Brigade Award for Civil War Scholarship, from The Milwaukee Civil War Round Table, Sept. 2020.
