= Indian cavalry =

Confederate military units

Indian cavalry is the name collectively given to the Midwestern and Eastern American Indians who fought during the American Civil War, most of them on horseback and for the Confederate States of America.

== Indian units in the CS Armed forces ==
=== Cherokee Nation ===
The Cherokee Braves Flag, as flown by Stand Watie.

The Choctaw Nation Flag, adopted in 1860 and carried by the tribal brigades.

- 1st Cherokee Mounted Rifles – Col. (later Brigadier) Stand Watie, Col. John Drew
- Thomas' Legion / 69th North Carolina Infantry – Col. William H. Thomas
- Scales'/Fry's Battalion of Cherokee Cavalry
- Meyer's Battalion of Cherokee Cavalry
- Cherokee Battalion of Infantry
- 2nd Cherokee Artillery Battery
- Livingston's Cherokee Spikes

=== Chickasaw Nation ===
- 1st Regiment of Chickasaw Infantry
- 1st Regiment of Chickasaw Cavalry – Col. William L. Hunter
- 1st Battalion, Chickasaw Cavalry (Shecoe's Btln., Chickasaw Mounted Volunteers) – Lt. Col. Joseph D. Harris, Lt. Col. Lemuel M. Reynolds, Lt. Col. Martin Shecoe

=== Choctaw Nation ===
- 1st Regiment Choctaw & Chickasaw Mounted Rifles – Col. (later Brigadier) Douglas H. Cooper
- 1st Regiment of Choctaw Mounted Rifles
- 2nd Regiment of Choctaw Cavalry
- 3rd Regiment of Choctaw Cavalry
- Deneale's Regiment of Choctaw Warriors
- Folsom's Battalion of Choctaw Mounted Rifles
- Wilkins' Company of Choctaw Infantry – Cpt. John Wilkins

=== Creek Nation ===
- 1st Creek Mounted Rifles – Col. Daniel N. McIntosh
- 2nd Creek Mounted Rifles – Lt. Col. Chilly McIntosh

=== Seminole Nation ===
- 1st Battalion Seminole Mounted Volunteers
- 2nd Regiment Seminole Mounted Volunteers

=== Others ===
- Osage Cavalry Battalion – Maj. Broken Arm

== Indian units in the US Armed forces ==
=== Indian Home Guard ===
- 1st Regiment, Indian Home Guard
- 2nd Regiment, Indian Home Guard – Col. John Ritchie
- 3rd Regiment, Indian Home Guard – Col. William A. Phillips
- 4th Regiment, Indian Home Guard

== See also ==
- Native Americans in the American Civil War
- Indian Territory in the American Civil War
- Confederate units of Indian Territory
- Confederate Government units – Indian cavalry
