= Native Americans in the American Civil War =

Role in the war of 1861 to 1865

The participation of Native Americans in the American Civil War involves both the official stances of tribal governments during the American Civil War and the actions of individual Native Americans in the United States during the conflict. An estimated 20,000 Native Americans fought on both sides in the war, with some reaching high ranks in both armies. Many more helped in support roles, such as supply and sabotage. A majority of Native Americans fought for the Confederacy, in part to protect slavery in Indian Territory, as well as a promise by the Confederate government that it would recognize an independent Native American country following the war's conclusion. Approximately 3,500 Native Americans fought on the side of the Union as well, hoping their support would ensure the federal government's respect of their rights and treaties. Many tribes initially viewed the conflict as a "white man's war," reluctant to become involved after enduring forced removal from ancestral lands during the Trail of Tears. Nonetheless, some saw military service as a means to gain political favor, end discrimination, and secure territorial rights—hopes that proved largely unfulfilled as removal and pacification policies continued even after emancipation.

== Indian Territory and the Civil War ==
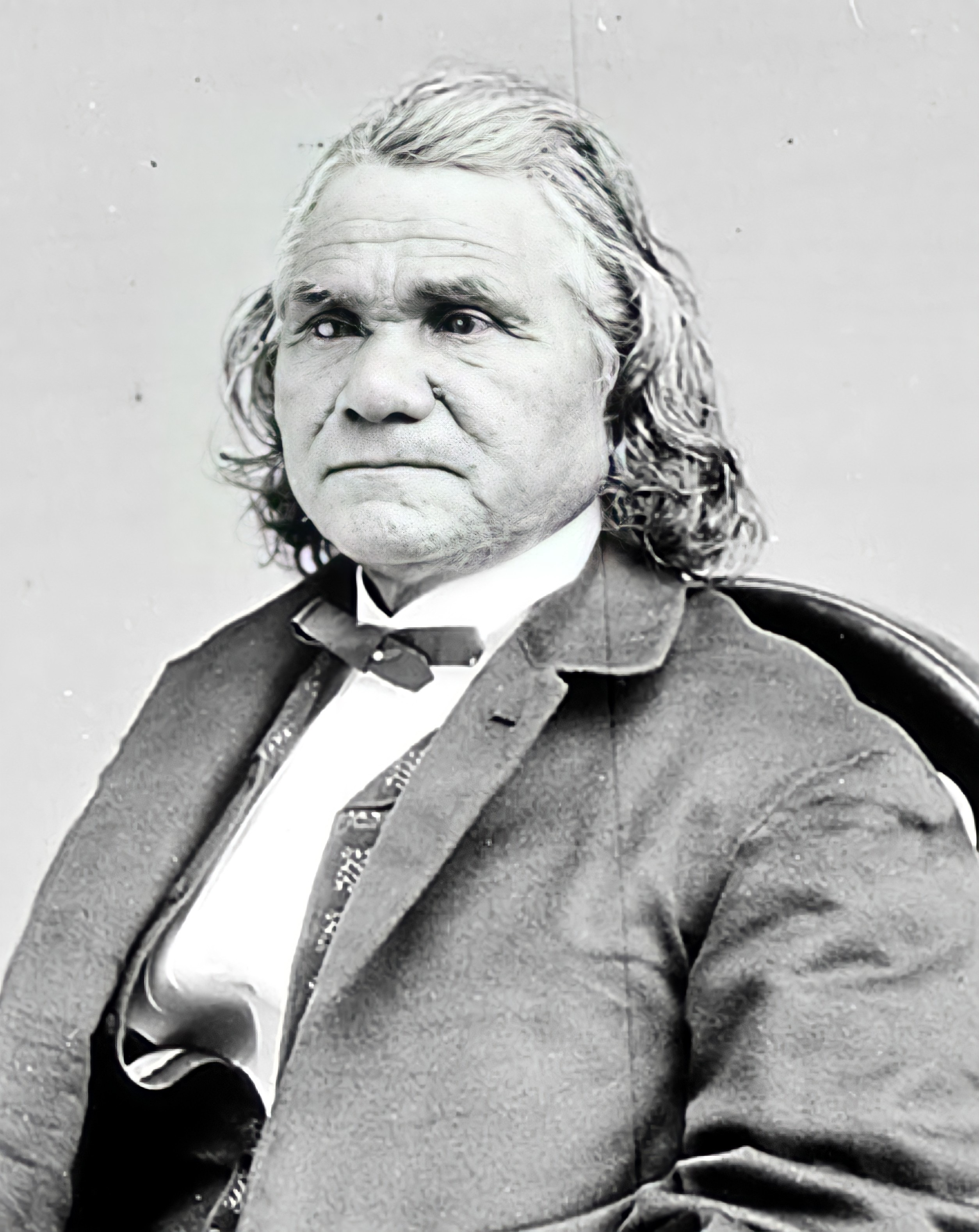
Cherokee politician Stand Watie

Neutrality proved impossible in Indian Territory (modern‑day Oklahoma), situated directly between Union and Confederate lands and home to the Chickasaw, Choctaw, Creek, Seminole, and the Cherokee Nations. In March 1861, Confederate President Jefferson Davis appointed Albert Pike as his envoy to negotiate alliances with the Five Civilized Tribes, aiming to bolster Confederate defenses against Union‑aligned incursions from Kansas. Most nations signed treaties with the Confederacy, often under pressure from wealthy, slave‑holding factions. However, these alliances were far from unanimous: large segments of those same tribes opposed slavery and sought independence from U.S. political turmoil. This divergence precipitated a three‑way split in Indian Territory: Cherokee Principal Chief John Ross's neutrality faction (later Union‑aligned), Stand Watie's Confederate Treaty Party, and Creek chief Opothleyahola's "Loyal Indians," who fled to Union‑held Kansas with refugees and escaped slaves.

The Confederate treaty with the Cherokee Nation guaranteed protection, rations, tools, and a congressional delegate in exchange for ten mounted companies. General Ben McCulloch organized two Native American regiments under John Drew and Watie. Although both led Cherokee units, Drew and Watie were longstanding rivals and commanders deliberately kept their regiments apart.

Recent research indicates that Choctaw involvement in the Civil War was more extensive than previously believed, with Confederate records showing strong enlistment among Choctaw men. Supporting documents, along with 19th-century narratives and personal writings, provide insight into their wartime experiences. For many Choctaw men, the war offered a chance to reassert traditional concepts of masculinity that had shifted during earlier decades. Historically, warfare was closely tied to male identity within Choctaw culture, but reduced intertribal conflict and increased contact with Euro-Americans had led to new expressions of manhood, including education, diplomacy, and other pursuits. The Civil War allowed Choctaw soldiers to reaffirm older ideals of masculinity through combat, while also defending tribal sovereignty, the institution of slavery, and existing racial hierarchies.

The Delaware Nation, having long maintained ties to the U.S. government despite forced removals to the Wichita Indian Agency in Oklahoma and later to Kansas, formally declared for the Union on October 1, 1861, with 170 of 201 able‑bodied Delaware men enlisting in the Union Army. In response to U.S. Commissioner of Indian Affairs William P. Dole's January 1862 call for Native recruitment, the 1st and 2nd Indian Home Guard regiments were raised, comprising Delaware, Creek, Seminole, Kickapoo, Seneca, Osage, Shawnee, Choctaw, and Chickasaw soldiers. In October 1862 Delaware cavalrymen played a key role in the capture of the Wichita Agency, slaying five Confederate agents, seizing a rebel flag, currency, and ponies, and destroying enemy supplies. Initially, the Indian Home Guard regiments operated under a white overall commander, with individual companies led by Native American officers; over time, administrative duties shifted entirely to white officers due to widespread illiteracy among Native troops, though Indigenous leaders continued to command in battle where their authority was most respected. These units faced challenges adapting to formal military discipline, resulting in frequent desertions, and some soldiers treated government‑issued firearms as personal property for hunting or sport, creating ammunition shortages that the War Department recouped by deducting costs from soldiers' pay.

The 2nd Cherokee Mounted Rifles under Drew fought for the Confederacy at the Battle of Pea Ridge on March 7–8, 1862, before defecting en masse to Union forces in Kansas and joining the Indian Home Guard. In mid‑1862, Ross was captured by Federal troops, paroled, and spent the remainder of the war in Washington, D.C., and Philadelphia advocating Cherokee support for the Union. In his absence, Watie was elected principal chief and promptly conscripted all Cherokee men aged 18–50 into Confederate service. Renowned for hit‑and‑run tactics, Watie was promoted to brigadier general in May 1864 and led the Indian Cavalry Brigade (comprising Cherokee, Creek, Osage, and Seminole units) to several notable victories, including the capture of the Union steamboat J.R. Williams at Pleasant Bluff (June 10, 1864) and the seizure of 129 wagons and 740 mules at the Second Battle of Cabin Creek. Watie became the last Confederate general to surrender, laying down his arms in June 1865, after Robert E. Lee and Kirby Smith. The Cherokee Nation suffered more than any other tribe due to its Confederate alignment: its population declined from approximately 21,000 in 1861 to about 15,000 by 1865, and despite earlier assurances of amnesty, the entire Nation was branded disloyal and stripped of its treaty rights.

Combat in Indian Territory persisted throughout the Civil War, as regular Union and Confederate forces and myriad guerrilla bands swept the region in a series of skirmishes and raids punctuated by only a few large battles such as the Battle of Honey Springs. These frequent, small‑scale engagements were often brutal, laying waste to civilian infrastructure: homes and businesses burned, fields left untilled, mills shuttered, and livestock driven off. The resulting poverty, disease, and displacement inflicted devastation on Native communities, subjecting Indian Territory to sustained warfare and occupation on a scale scarcely seen elsewhere in either the Union or the Confederacy. The Wichita Agency was among the institutions ruined. Ongoing guerrilla warfare and the displacement of communities led to severe loss of life, with postwar estimates indicating high rates of widows, orphans, and fatherless children. In the aftermath, treaties treated the Civilized Tribes as belligerents, setting a precedent that ultimately facilitated greater federal intervention and the further division of their lands by white settlers.

Unlike formerly enslaved people, who were granted legal protections through Reconstruction Amendments, Native Americans remained classified as "domestic dependent nations" and were excluded from full citizenship rights, as seen in the Fourteenth Amendment's continued exclusion of "Indians not taxed." In the postwar years, the U.S. government intensified military campaigns against Native peoples across the West, often using tactics and leaders shaped by Civil War experience. Figures such as Phillip Sheridan and William Tecumseh Sherman oversaw these efforts, while President Ulysses S. Grant presided over policies that expanded federal control. By 1882, military operations against Native Americans consumed the vast majority of the War Department's budget and personnel, highlighting the central role of Native resistance in shaping postwar federal military priorities.

== Beyond Indian Territory ==
In the eastern theater, several tribes that had not yet been displaced by removal aligned with the Confederacy. Thomas' Legion, composed of Eastern Band Cherokee under Colonel William Holland Thomas, operated in the mountains of Tennessee and North Carolina, while roughly 200 Cherokee formed the Junaluska Zouaves. Across South Carolina, nearly every adult Catawba male enlisted in the 5th, 12th, or 17th South Carolina Volunteer Infantry of the Army of Northern Virginia, distinguishing themselves during the Peninsula Campaign, at Second Manassas, and at Antietam—and later enduring the grueling lines at the Siege of Petersburg. A monument in Columbia commemorates their service, though the regiments' heavy casualties severely threatened the Catawba community's survival.

Further north, the Pamunkey of Virginia and the Lumbee of North Carolina sided with the Union. The Pamunkey provided civilian and naval piloting for Union vessels, while the Lumbee engaged in guerrilla operations. Members of the Iroquois Nation served in Company K of the 54th Pennsylvania Infantry Regiment, and Powhatan guides acted as river pilots and scouts for the Army of the Potomac. At the time, Native Americans enlisting in U.S. Colored Troops were categorized simply as "colored," and records show that many Pequot from New England fought in the 31st United States Colored Infantry Regiment and other Black regiments.

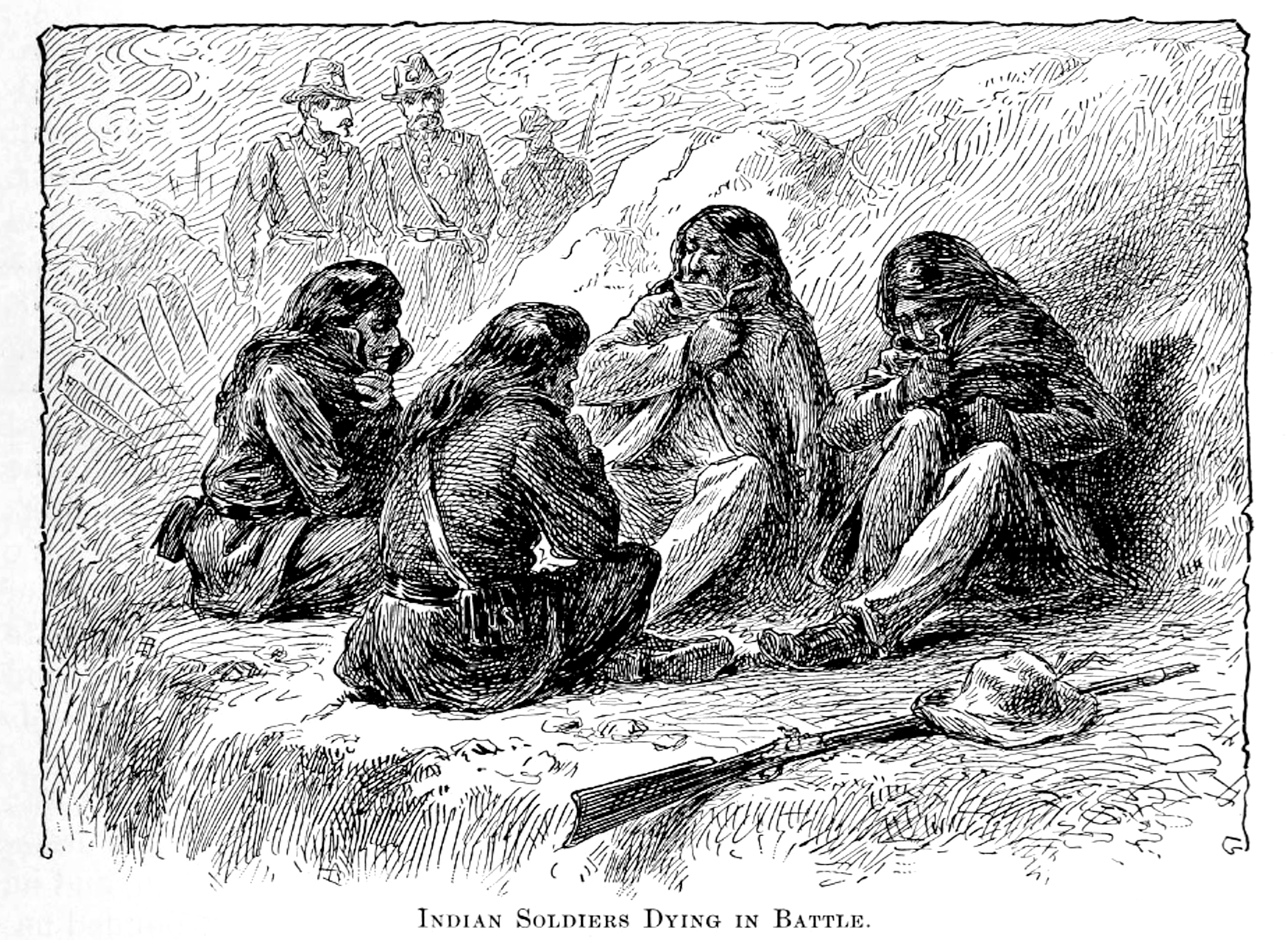
Four First Nation Members of Company K, 1st Michigan Sharpshooters chanting their death songs at the Battle of the Crater

Perhaps the best‑known Native American contingent in the eastern Union Army was Company K of the 1st Michigan Sharpshooters Regiment, made up predominantly of Odawa, Delaware, Oneida, Potawatomi, and Ojibwa soldiers. Assigned to the Army of the Potomac as Ulysses S. Grant took command, Company K saw action at the Battle of the Wilderness and the Battle of Spotsylvania Court House and famously captured 600 Confederates at Shand House near Petersburg. In their final engagement at the Battle of the Crater on July 30, 1864, they found themselves cut off and low on ammunition; a lieutenant later recounted that, even as they fell mortally wounded, they pulled their blouses over their faces, chanted a death song, and died together in a group.

In 1864, Colorado Territory Governor John Evans, concerned that Plains tribes might ally and arm themselves as Union troops were withdrawn for Civil War service, secured President Lincoln's approval to raise the 3rd Colorado Infantry Regiment "for the sole purpose of fighting hostile Indians." Under Colonel John Chivington, the unit found no organized opposition after Cheyenne chiefs Black Kettle and White Antelope met with territorial authorities in Denver and agreed to bring any non‑combatants to Fort Lyon for protection. On November 29, 1864, however, Chivington led a dawn assault on the peaceful encampment of some 500 Cheyenne and Arapaho near Big Sandy Creek, many of whom were unarmed women and children. Witnesses recounted widespread killings, mutilations, and sexual violence; estimates place the dead between 160 and 200. A subsequent Congressional inquiry into the Sand Creek Massacre determined that Chivington had acted without authorization and recommended his removal, but no criminal charges were filed. In the massacre's aftermath, many survivors joined the militant Dog Soldiers band, precipitating further conflict on the southern Plains.

== See also ==
- Catawba in the American Civil War
- Cherokee in the American Civil War
- Choctaw in the American Civil War
- Seminole in the American Civil War
- Indian Territory in the American Civil War
- Diplomacy of the American Civil War
