= Ambush of the steamboat J. R. Williams =

1864 American Civil War attack

Coordinates: 35.435°N 95.026°W

Ambush at Pleasant Bluff
- Part of the American Civil War
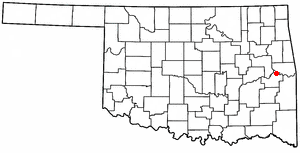
- Approximate location of Pleasant Bluff, I.T.
Date	June 15, 1864
Location	Pleasant Bluff, Indian Territory
Result	Confederate States victory

Belligerents
(Confederate States of America) Confederate States; Choctaw Nation	United States

Commanders and leaders
(Confederate States of America) Stand Watie	(United States) Horace Cook

Strength
400	26

Casualties and losses
	4 killed, 6 captured

The ambush of the steamboat J.R. Williams was a military engagement during the American Civil War. It took place on June 15, 1864, on the Arkansas River in the Choctaw Nation (Indian Territory) which became encompassed by the State of Oklahoma. It is popularly termed the "only naval battle" in that landlocked state. It was a successful Confederate attack on the Union Army's lines of supply. The Confederate forces were Cherokee, Choctaw, Chickasaw and Creek Indians led by Cherokee General Stand Watie.

== Background ==
The Union army was unprepared for the logistical challenges of trying to regain control of Indian Territory from the Confederate government after abandoning its forts there early in the Civil War. The area was largely undeveloped, and the Union did not have enough troops to control the few roads. Groups of Indigenous peoples who sought to remain neutral in the conflict as well as the Union-allied factions had abandoned their farms because of raids by Confederate-allied factions and fled to Kansas or Missouri, seeking protection by Union army forces there. It was not feasible to sustain a large military operation by living off the land. This was demonstrated in 1862, when General William Weer (Note: Weer had been elevated to brigadier general in the Kansas militia in 1862, but was only a colonel 4th Kansas Volunteer Infantry at the time of the Indian Expedition.) led 5,000 men in the "Indian Expedition" into Indian Territory from Baxter Springs, Kansas. Weer's troops captured a Confederate supply train at the Battle of Locust Grove. However, no Union supplies arrived after that, and the expedition ran short of food, ammunition and other essentials. (Note: Ammunition had to be sent from Fort Leavenworth, while animal feed and other supplies had to be carried from Fort Scott, over 150 miles away from Weer's position. All of this had to come by wagon trains down the Texas Road.)Colonel Frederick Salomon placed Weer under arrest and assumed command of the expedition and withdrew to meet up with the supply trains.

After the Confederate losses at the first Battle of Cabin Creek on 17 July 1863, and the Battle of Fort Smith the Union forces had essentially uncontested control of the Arkansas River between them. It had become feasible to resupply Union positions (e.g., Fort Gibson) in eastern Indian Territory by water instead of overland. Previously, the Union could only supply its forces in Indian Territory by wagon train from Fort Scott, Kansas. The supply trains soon proved to be relatively easy targets for Confederate raiders.

Steamboats like J. R. Williams were used for this purpose. Those used on the Arkansas typically, had stern-mounted paddle wheels to propel the ship, while a wood-fired boiler generated the steam that powered the wheel. There is anecdotal information that indicates wood was the fuel for inland steamboats. Coal and oil became more important after the Civil War (and with the depletion of American forests near the waterways).

The fortunes of war had gone against the Confederate States of America by midsummer of 1863. Union victories in the southeastern states were rapidly depleting the Confederate Army of men and supplies, neither of which was replaceable. The Texas units were largely withdrawn from Indian Territory, leaving only units of Native Americans (principally the Five Civilized Tribes) to defend against further Union army incursions. (Note: A treaty between the CSA and its Indian allies had stipulated that the latter could not be required to fight outside the borders of Indian Territory. The Confederate troops remaining in Indian Territory were commanded by the noted Cherokee Colonel Stand Watie, who was a subordinate of Major General Samuel Bell Maxey. Watie had already demonstrated his military capabilities and acquired a reputation as a guerilla fighter. (Note: His tactics "earned him the sobriquet, 'The Indian Swamp Fox,' because his style of warfare was modeled after that of General Francis Marion of Revolutionary War fame.) Since the remaining Confederate forces were too weak to confront the Union forces there directly, Watie resorted to harassing tactics with hit-and-run raids. One of the most notable of these was an ambush of the supply steamboat J. R. Williams at Pleasant Bluff, on the Arkansas River. (Note: Watie and D. H. Cooper erroneously called this location "Pheasant Bluff" in their reports after the action.)) The raid was partially successful, in that the steamboat was destroyed by the action, and the cargo kept from the Union Army. The cargo was said to be worth $120,000.00. It was a propaganda victory and morale builder for the Confederates and an embarrassment to the Union. It had no military effect, and the monetary loss to the Union was soon dwarfed by the Confederate ambush of a very large wagon train at the Second Battle of Cabin Creek.

== Attack ==
A Confederate military force commanded by General Stand Watie, (Note: Watie learned after the ambush that he had been promoted from colonel to brigadier general.) ambushed a Union supply steamboat on the Arkansas River in Indian Territory. The Confederates managed to overwhelm and disperse the Union guards, disable the vessel, loot the cargo, then destroy the vessel before withdrawing. Although the encounter left unchanged the American Civil War's outcome, it was a morale-booster for the rebel supporters and reportedly helped the Native American allies of the Confederacy prolong a stalemate in the territory until war's end in 1865. The raid did not have an official military name; many years later, a publication by the Oklahoma Civil War Sesquicentennial referred to it as the "Pleasant Bluff Action." The encounter has been called "the only naval battle ever fought in Oklahoma."

On 15 June 1864, the steamboat J. R. Williams was proceeding up the Arkansas River from Fort Smith to Fort Gibson. Its cargo was primarily commissary goods and food for the Native American refugees who had recently returned from their exile in Kansas and Missouri, hoping to recover their homes and farms they had abandoned in Indian Territory. A token guard–one officer (Lieutenant Horace A. B. Cook), a sergeant and 24 privates from the 12th Regiment Kansas Volunteer Infantry—was aboard.

As the steamboat rounded a bend at Pleasant Bluff, located just below the mouth of the Canadian River near the present-day town of Tamaha in Haskell County, Oklahoma, a Confederate force of about 400 men, commanded by Colonel Stand Watie, opened fire with cannon and small arms. The artillery was particularly effective. The smokestack, pilot house and boiler were hit, disabling the vessel. The captain and crew managed to ground the boat on the north bank of the river, opposite the Confederate position. The guardsmen opened fire, even though steam from the boiler enveloped the deck.

Cook wanted to hold off the Confederates until Union reinforcements arrived, but he saw the ship's captain and the sergeant sailing the steamboat's yawl across the river toward the enemy position. Realizing that the Confederates would use that to attack the steamboat in force, he ordered his surviving men to abandon ship. (Note: Confederate after-action reports claimed that the initial assault had killed four Union soldiers and that two more were taken prisoner.) Cook and his men withdrew, located a Union army camp nearby and reported the ambush. Meanwhile, Watie's men boarded the abandoned steamboat and managed to tow it to a sandbar on the south side of the river. They hastily unloaded the cargo onto the bar, then began to load as much as possible on their horses. Watie knew that his command was depleted. So many men had left to carry their booty home, that his artillery was in jeopardy.

One article stated that the boat carried a thousand barrels of flour and fifteen tons of bacon. According to another account the cargo included a load of men's dress clothing, with top hats, dinner jackets with tails, fancy trousers and spats. Allegedly, Watie's men wore these as their uniforms thereafter. A more lethal part of the cargo was 400 Sharps rifles and 600 new revolvers. Later that day, Colonel John Ritchie and 200 men from the 2nd Regiment of the Indian Home Guard arrived from the Union camp and began to fire on the Confederates. The river began to rise, and after Ritchie's arrival, covered the sandbar and the remainder of the cargo. The rising water even carried away part of the flour and bacon that had been moved to higher ground. Watie set the steamboat afire and withdrew from the scene with his troops. Shortly afterward, he received official news of his promotion to brigadier general, effective May 10, 1864.

It is reported that many of the Confederate troops took their booty and disappeared, thereby hampering General Watie's next operation.

== Aftermath and impact ==
On July 17, 1864, Watie reported the results of the encounter to his superior, General Cooper. He noted that he was sending six prisoners from the steamboat. He also stated that four of the Union men were killed.

The raid did not have an official military name; many years later, a publication by the Oklahoma Civil War Sesquicentennial referred to it as the "Pleasant Bluff Action."

To the Confederates, especially those in the Indian Territory, Watie's success was primarily symbolic. However, the outcome had no meaningful effect on the outcome of the American Civil War. It was a morale booster and provided some much needed supplies in the local theater of operation. To the Union, it emphasized the risk of moving supplies via river transport and the need to control the few roads. To local Confederate supporters, almost desperate for favorable war news in 1864, it was a time for rejoicing. Stand Watie's reputation as a successful guerilla raider was enhanced.

The action has been commemorated by a marker erected by the Oklahoma Historical Society in Stigler, Oklahoma, in 1995. The inscription reads:

Battle of the J. R. Williams
Site of Civil War naval battle. Confederate Indian forces led by Cherokee Maj. Gen. Stand Watie, forced aground and captured Union steamboat J. R. Williams with cargo valued at $120,000, on June 15, 1864. Southern troops included Choctaws, Chickasaws, Creeks and Seminoles.

Some present-day Oklahomans like to refer to this encounter as "the only naval battle ever fought in Oklahoma".

The U. S. Congress authorized publication of the official war records of both armies of the Civil War. Colonel Watie's official dispatches, and those of his commanding officer regarding this battle were published in 1891.
