= Osage Battalion =

Native American infantry unit of the Confederate States Army

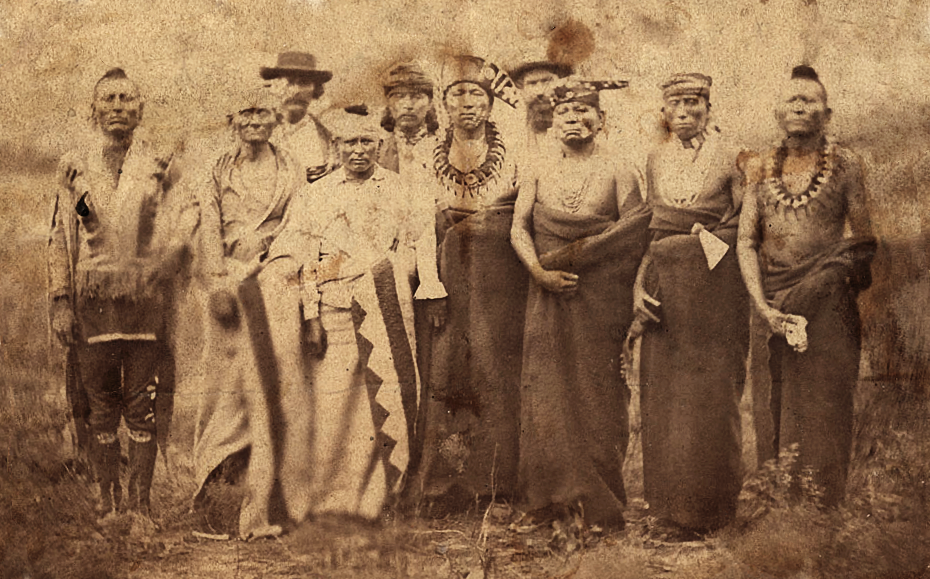
- A group of Osage pictured at the Fort Smith Council in 1865. The Osage Battalion's Captain Black Dog II is far left and Captain Ogeese Captain is third from left.
- Active: Early 1863 - June 23, 1865
- Country: Confederate States of America
- Allegiance: Confederate States Army
- Size: 200 men
- Engagements: American Civil War: Second Battle of Cabin Creek

Commanders
- Notable commanders: Broke Arm

The Osage Battalion was a Native American unit of the Confederate States Army. Recruited from among the Osage tribe, whose loyalties were split between the Union and Confederacy, it did not meet its 500-man establishment. From early 1863 a four-company battalion of 200 men served under Brigadier General Douglas H. Cooper in the Trans-Mississippi Department. In 1864 the unit was transferred to the First Indian Brigade under Native American Brigadier General Stand Watie and fought under his command at the Second Battle of Cabin Creek on September 19, 1864. The battalion surrendered to Union forces on June 23, 1865, one of the last Confederate units to lay down its arms.

== Background ==
By the start of the American Civil War in 1861 most of the Osage tribe lived in Southeastern Kansas, a newly admitted state which remained generally in Union hands throughout the war. The Indian Territory, modern Oklahoma, lay immediately to the south of Kansas and had recently been designated a home for the Five Civilized Tribes of the Cherokee, Chickasaw, Choctaw, Creek, and Seminole. The Osage were split into two major groups, the Great Osage and the Little Osage, and then into separate semi-autonomous bands. Prior to the war the two major American influences upon the Osage were the Jesuit mission at Osage Mission's post in Neosho County, whose members generally favored the Union, and the prominent merchant John Allen Mathews, who favored the Confederacy.

After the outbreak of the war, the Confederacy was keen to sign military treaties with the Indian tribes to secure their western frontier and diplomatic advances were made towards the Osage. The Osage were encouraged to sign a treaty by Mathews, the former U.S. Indian agent Andrew J. Dorn, and representatives from the Cherokee, who had chosen to side with the Confederacy. Mathews had been appointed a colonel in the Confederate army and led a unit of white, Cherokee and Osage men in the Indian Territory.

Mathews, married to an Osage woman, set his sights on the mission run by Schoenmakers; however, his own son had been educated there and was sentimental toward him. The Jesuits were informed by their former pupil, and they fled. Mathews plans were foiled by a heavy rain, and no attack was ever launched on Osage Mission's post.

In September 1861, Union forces led by James G. Blunt defeated John Mathews, killing him and routing his troops.

The White Hair, Big Hill, Clermont and Black Dog bands of the Great Osage signed a cooperation treaty with the Confederacy on October 2, 1861. The Confederacy thereafter annexed much of the Osage territory, including that belonging to the Little Osage who had not signed the treaty. The Confederate government appointed Dorn as its Indian agent to the Osage and Louis Pharamond Chouteau, of mixed white and Osage heritage, was appointed as official government interpreter.

== Formation ==
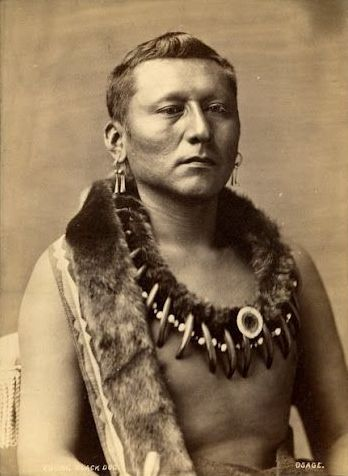
Black Dog II pictured in 1876

The treaty required the Great Osage to raise a 500-man unit for military service with the Confederacy; this unit was to be known as the Osage battalion. Chouteau was appointed adjutant and quartermaster of the unit, and an Osage named Broke Arm was its commander. Two of the company commanders were Captain Black Dog II (also known as Young Black Dog, the son of Osage chief Black Dog) and Captain Ogeese (or Augustus) Captain. The Osage became the only Native American tribe outside of the Five Civilized Tribes to join the Confederate Armed Forces in any significant number.

Recruitment to the battalion was hindered by the killing of John Allen Mathews by Union forces, which led to the withdrawal of the White Hair and Big Hill bands from the treaty. Other issues included the Union's occupation of much of the Osage reserve throughout the war, and the high level of support for the Union among the Osage people. A number of Osage formed a Union "Osage Battalion" that took part in Colonel William Weer's Indian Expedition of 1862 and many joined the Union 2nd Indian Home Guard Regiment, formed in Kansas that same year. The Confederate Osage Battalion was formed in early 1863. It consisted of 200 men split into four companies with both men and officers drawn from the Osage community. From June 23, 1863, the battalion formed part of General Douglas H. Cooper's brigade of the Trans-Mississippi Department and participated in raids on Union-held territory.

During this period the Confederacy made several payments of gold to the Osage, though their ability to administer the reserve was hampered by the Union occupation. Distributions of currency, food and stores were made to Osage refugees in Indian Territory, rather than Kansas.

== First Indian Brigade ==
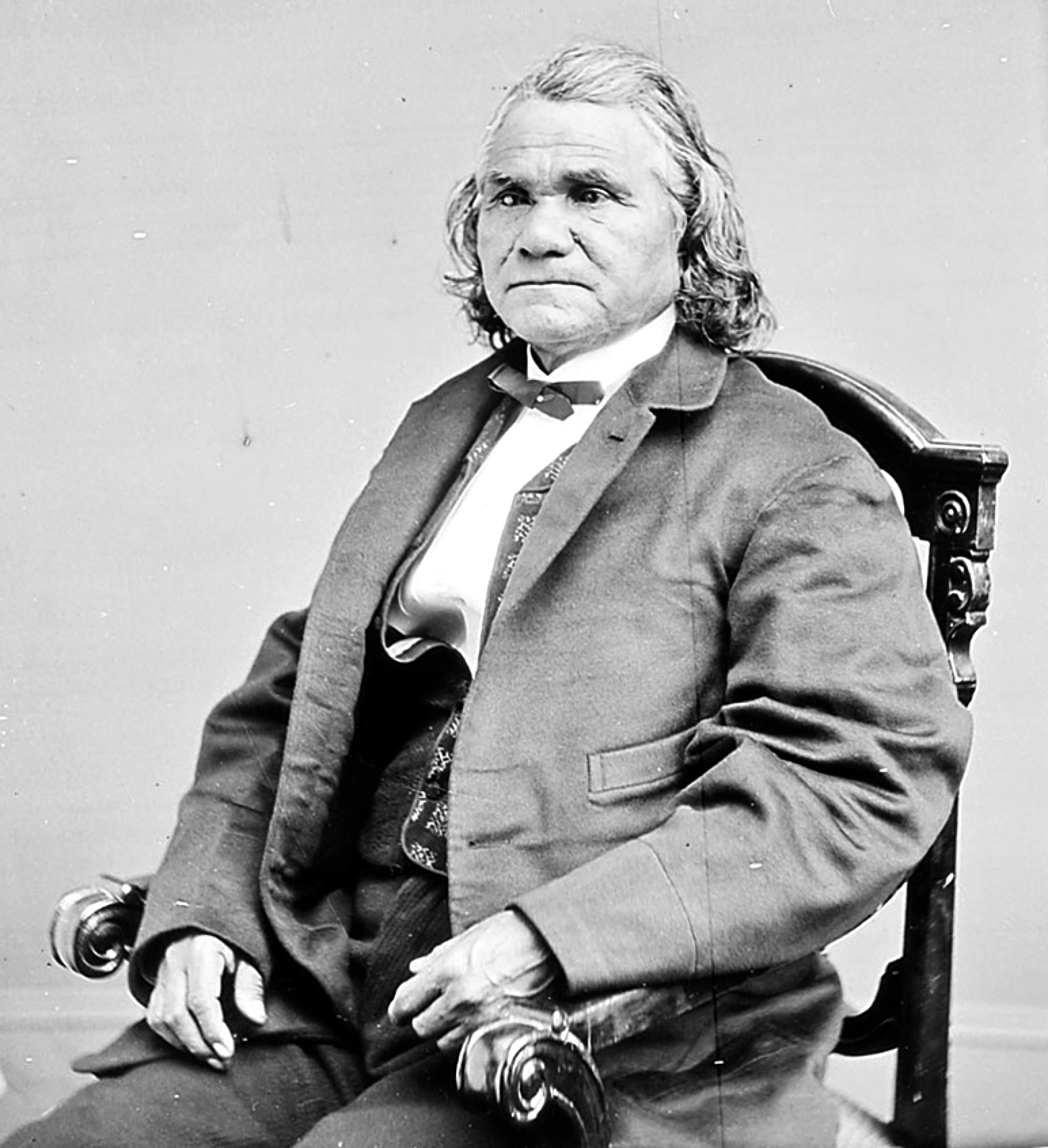
Stand Watie pictured after the war

During Major General Samuel B. Maxey's early 1864 reorganisation of Confederate forces in the Indian Territory, the Osage Battalion became part of Brigadier General Stand Watie's First Indian Brigade of the Army of the Trans-Mississippi from May 10.

The Osage Battalion fought at the Second Battle of Cabin Creek, where the Confederates captured 130 wagons and more than 1,800 horses and mules from a Union supply train. By early 1865 Chouteau reported that the battalion was in good spirits but lacked for uniforms and requested fresh supplies from the Confederate authorities.

== Surrender ==
The American Civil War is considered to have ended on May 9, 1865, with Union president Andrew Johnson's declaration of the same, but isolated units continued to be active after this time. The Osage battalion did not surrender to Union forces until June 23. It submitted at Fort Towson near Doaksville, Indian Territory, as part of a ceremony with some of the Cherokee, Creek and Seminole forces of Watie's command. Watie was the last Confederate general to capitulate and this ceremony marked the "last formal surrender of any significant body of Confederate troops".

In the aftermath of the war the Osage were summoned to the US government's Fort Smith Council in September 1865, but were not made to sign new agreements. This was in contrast to the Five Civilized Tribes, who were told they had forfeited all previous treaty rights by signing treaties with the Confederacy.

== See also ==
- Indian Territory in the American Civil War
