= Catawba in the American Civil War =

The Catawba in the American Civil War participated in the Eastern Theater. From the very beginning, the Catawba allied themselves with the Confederacy, remaining loyal until the end of the War. They enrolled with the 5th, 12th, and 17th South Carolina Infantry Regiments.

== Background ==
The Catawba people live in the South Carolina region, as they did prior to European contact. The Catawba call themselves, "yeh is-WAH h’reh" or "People of the River."

The earliest documented European contact occurred when Hernando de Soto's Spanish expedition reached the Piedmont plateau. There would be no colonial contact for almost 100 years after the "De Soto Entrada."

As European settlers established themselves along the eastern coast, the Catawba became experienced traders. The deer skin market helped the Catawba receive European goods like muskets, iron knives, kettles, and cloth but also brought along disease and encroachment.

In 1747, the Province of South Carolina allotted the Catawba 15 square miles in the York and Lancaster districts.

American colonists considered the Catawba "the best friends the colonist had." When the Revolutionary War started, there were between 1,000 to 5,000 or more Catawbas. It is said that more than 500 lost their lives during the Revolutionary War. The Catawbas served under General Lee's Legion and fought with him in 1780. For siding with the Americans during the revolution, the British destroyed the Catawba's major village.

On March 13 of 1840, a treaty was made between South Carolina and the Catawba. At that time, their delegation at the signing was recorded as 12 men, 36 women, and 40 boys & girls.

When the Civil War began, the Catawba were "an obscure enclave in a social system [southern plantation slavery] that was beginning to break down." They became a group dependent on the "Southern way of life" which they believed was "meaningful" and "worth fighting for." An elderly Catawba who lived through the American Civil War noted that a "good many [Catawba Indians] went, about 20."

== Eastern Theater ==
The Catawba first enrolled in Captain Lucian Palmer Sadler's Company on December 9, 1861. Sadler became ill and had to retire after one year of service. The Company ultimately became part of the 17th South Carolina Infantry Regiment, as Company K. Only four Catawba Indians enrolled with this company: Jefferson Ayers, William Canty, John Scott, and Alexander Tims.

In 1861, Cadwallader Jones Jr. created a company known as the Indian Land Guards. The company was later assigned to the 12th South Carolina Infantry. Jones’ company served in several battles: the Peninsula Campaign, the Second Battle of Bull Run, Antietam, and at the Siege of Petersburg.

Only 19 Catawba Indians are known to have enrolled in the Confederacy:

- Jefferson Ayers
- John Brown
- Frank Canty
- William Canty
- Robert/Bob Crawford
- Billy George
- Gilbert George
- Nelson George
- Allen Harris
- Epps Harris
- Jim Harris
- John Harris
- Peter Harris Jr.
- Robert/Bob Head
- James Kegg
- Robert Marsh
- John Sanders
- John Scott
- Alexander Timms.

=== 5th South Carolina Infantry ===
The Catawbas served in Company G. Only three were known to be enrolled: Robert/Bob Crawford, Peter Harris, and Robert/Bob Head.

=== 12th South Carolina Infantry ===
In the 12th, the Catawbas had the most enrollments of Indians.

=== 17th South Carolina Infantry ===
The Catawbas served in the Lacy Guards, Company K. The 17th was part of the Army of Northern Virginia.

=== Organization ===
The Catawba did not create a unit of their own but enrolled in Captain Lucian P. Sadler's Company, Captain Cadwallader Jones' Company, and Captain Witherspoon's Company.

- 5th South Carolina Infantry
  - Field & Staff: Colonel Micah Jenkins (promoted), Colonel John R. R. Giles (Killed), Colonel A. Coward, Lieutenant Colonel G.W.H. Legg, Major William J. Thomson, A. W. Thomson (Surgeon), H.H. Durant (Chaplain), J.D. Wright (A.Q.M.), and J.W. Avery (Adjutant)
  - Companies:
    - Company A (Captain John Wesley Goss, Captain John D. Mylia),
    - Company B (Captain Andrew Jackson),
    - Company C (Captain J.C. Beckham, Captain Ryal B. Seay, Captain Thomas H. Dunn (Died), Captain J. Banks Lyle),
    - Company D (Captain John R. R. Giles),
    - Company E (Captain H.J.T. Glenn, Captain S.B. Meachaw),
    - Company F (Captain A.H. Foster, Captain Andrew Jackson, Captain Jonathan Fitchett (Died)),
    - Company G (Captain J. L. Carpenter (killed), Captain J.P. Whiteside),
    - Company H (Captain A.E. Hutchison, Captain William J. Bowen, Captain W.J.T. Gleen, Captain Charles W. Scott, Captain James D. Steedman, and Captain Thomas Comer),
    - Company I (Captain Cato A. Seabrook, Captain William Daniel Camp),
    - Company K (Captain Joseph Walker, Captain Ryal Seay, and Captain William Chocie).
- 12th South Carolina Infantry
  - Field & Staff: Colonel R.G.M. Dunovant, Lieutenant Colonel Dixon Barnes, E. Turnipseed (Surgeon), and W. C. Buchanan (Adjutant)
  - Companies:
    - Company A (Captain W.H. McCorkle, Captain L.M. Grist, Captain John Parker),
    - Company B (Captain John L. Miller, Captain W.S. Dunlop),
    - Company C (Captain Henry C. Davis, Captain J.A. Hinnant, Captain J.W. Delleny (killed)),
    - Company D (Captain Edwin F. Booker, Captain John H. Kinsley, Captain William H. Farley),
    - Company E (Captain C.F. Hinson, Captain J. Frank Clyborn),
    - Company F (Captain Hayne McMeekin, Captain John C. Bell),
    - Company G (Captain A.D. Gaillard, Captain John M. Moody),
    - Company H (Captain Cadwallader Jones Sr., Captain G.E. Mchiele, Captain F.A. Erwin, Captain Robert M. Kerr),
    - Company I (Captain Dvion Barnes, Captain N.V. Vanlanding, Captain W.J. Shover),
    - Company K (Captain L.B. Johnson, Captain J.C. Nevill, Captain John C.B. Smith)
- 17th South Carolina Infantry
  - Field & Staff: Colonel John H. Means (died), Lieutenant Colonel F.W. McMaster, Lieutenant Colonel J.F. McMaster, Lieutenant Colonel R.S. Means, Lieutenant Colonel J.R. Culp, Major Julius Mills, Major J.W. Avery, Surgeon William Wylie, Surgeon J.H. Logan, Assistant Surgeon John D. Palmer
  - Companies:
    - Company A (Captain John R. Culp, Captain W.H. Edwards),
    - Company B (Captain W.P. Coleman, Captain N.A. Burley),
    - Company C (Captain John A. Witherspoon, Captain John W. Mitchell, Captain William Dunovant, Captain William H. Moore),
    - Company D (Captain James Beaty, Captain W.G. Steveson),
    - Company E (Captain T.G. Meacham, Captain John C. Holley, Captain E.R. Mills),
    - Company G (Captain J.H. Kease, Captain William J. Dickinson, Captain George H. Kearse),
    - Company H (Captain William J. Sauders, Captain H.M. Ray, Captain H. Martin Ulmer),
    - Company I (Captain J.D. Caskey, Captain James F. Steele),
    - Company K (Captain Lucian P. Sadler, Captain E.A. Crawford)

== Aftermath ==
The Catawba community survived the Civil War. They were not renowned for their participation during the War, despite their engagements in famous battles.

=== Monument ===
Captain Samuel White helped to create a monument to the Catawba Indians and had the names of the brave warriors who fought in the Confederate war placed on it.

In 1900, the Catawba was honored by a monument for their service during the American Civil War. One son whose father was in the 12th South Carolina Infantry gave a speech.

The Yorkville Enquirer reported the following: "For the fourth time in the history of Fort Mill, the citizens have assembled for the purpose of unveiling a monument. The first to the Confederate Soldier, on December 22d, 1891; the second, to the Women of the South, on the 21st day of May, 1895, when Colonel J. P. Thomas, of Columbia, delivered a scholarly address; the third, to the Faithful Slaves of the South, unveiled on the 21st day of May, 1895, when Colonel Polk Miller delivered a characteristic address. Today, in the presence of a large crowd, consisting of a number of Indians and many citizens of surrounding community, the monument of the Indians was open for inspection ..."

== See also ==
- Cherokee in the American Civil War
- Choctaw in the American Civil War
- Seminole in the American Civil War
