= Indian Territory in the American Civil War =

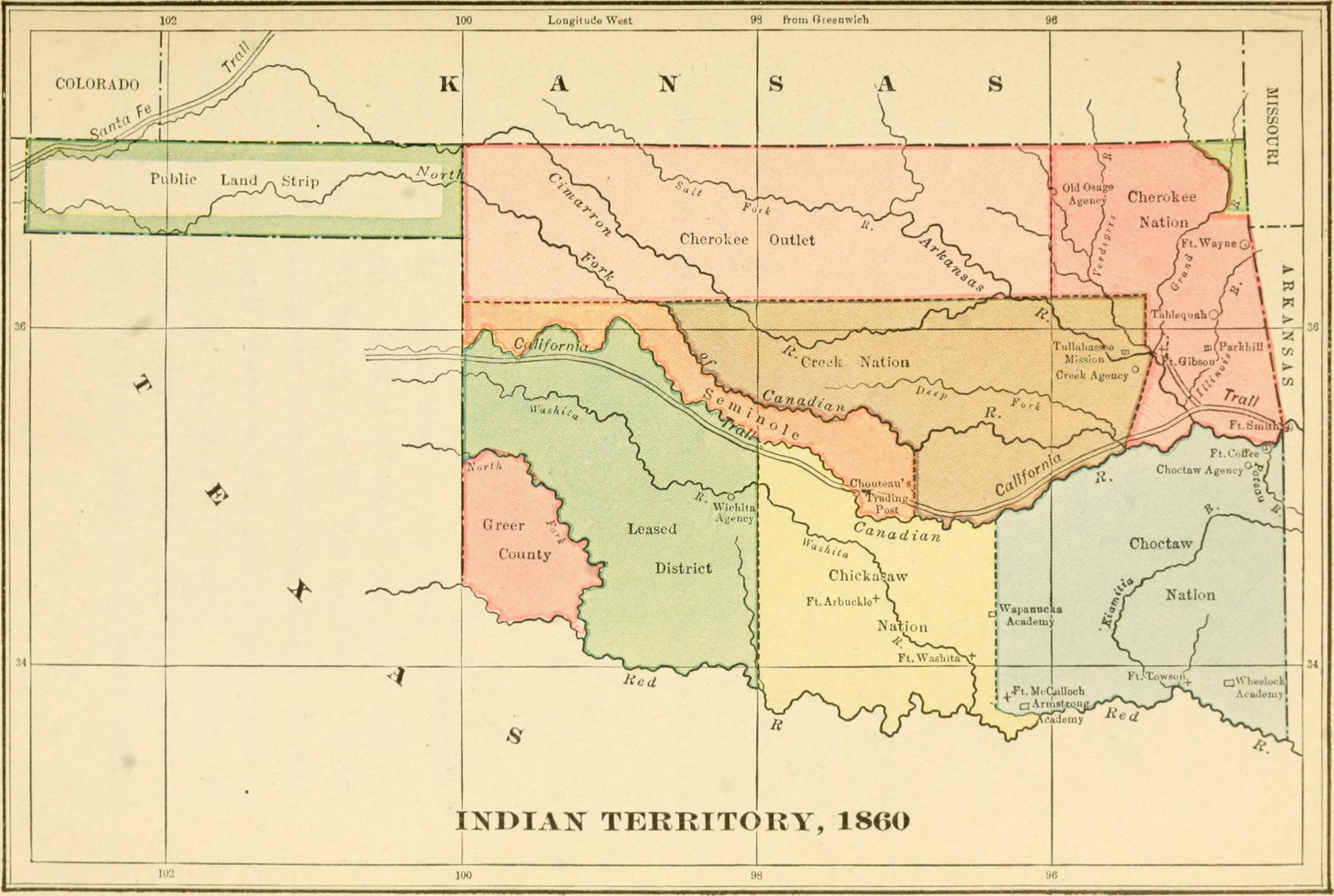
Map of the unorganized territory, 1860

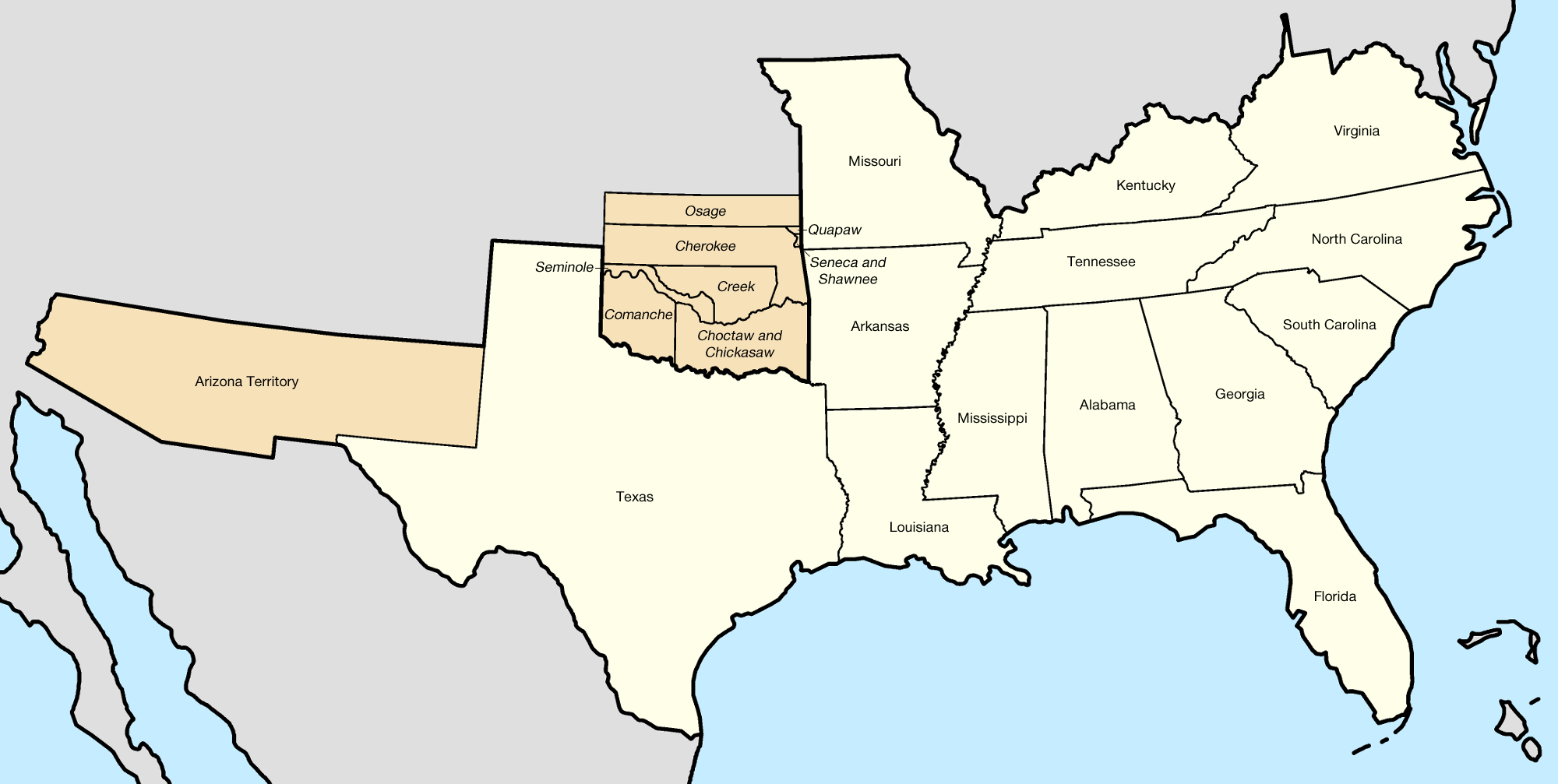
Map of the Confederate States including the mostly Union-aligned but deeply divided and split southern border states of Missouri and Kentucky which both had Confederate state governments as well as Unionist, the Arizona Territory, and allied tribes in present-day Oklahoma

During the American Civil War, most of what is now the U.S. state of Oklahoma was designated as the Indian Territory. It served as an unorganized region that had been set aside specifically for Native American tribes and was occupied mostly by tribes which had been removed from their ancestral lands in the Southeastern United States following the Indian Removal Act of 1830. As part of the Trans-Mississippi Theater, the Indian Territory was the scene of numerous skirmishes and seven officially recognized battles involving both Native American units allied with the Confederate States of America and Native Americans loyal to the United States government, as well as other Union and Confederate troops.

Most tribal leaders in Indian Territory aligned with the Confederacy. A total of at least 7,860 Native Americans from the Indian Territory participated in the Confederate Army, as both officers and enlisted men; most came from the Five Civilized Tribes: the Cherokee, Chickasaw, Choctaw, Creek, and Seminole nations. The Union organized several regiments of the Indian Home Guard to serve in the Indian Territory and occasionally in adjacent areas of Kansas, Missouri, and Arkansas.

== Native American alliances ==
Before the outbreak of war, the United States government relocated all soldiers in the Indian Territory to other key areas, leaving the territory unprotected from Texas and Arkansas, which had already joined the Confederacy. The Confederacy took an interest in the territory, seeking a possible source of food in the event of a Union blockade, a connection to western territories, and a buffer between Texas and the Union-held Kansas. At the onset of war, Confederate forces took possession of the U.S. army forts in the area. In June and July 1861, Confederate officers negotiated with Native American tribes for combat support. After refusing to allow Creek lands to be annexed by the Confederacy, the Creek Principal Chief Opothleyahola led the Creek supporters of the Union to Kansas, having to fight along the way. Leaders from each of the Five Civilized Tribes, acting without the consensus of their councils, agreed to be annexed by the Confederacy in exchange for certain rights, including protection and recognition of current tribal lands.

After reaching Kansas and Missouri, Opothleyahola and Native Americans loyal to the Union formed three volunteer regiments known as the Indian Home Guard. It fought in the Indian Territory and Arkansas.

The following Indian Nations not only had suffered forced migration at the hands of the American government but signed treaties of alliance with the CSA:

- Cherokee Nation
- Chickasaw Nation
- Choctaw Nation
- Creek Nation
- Seminole Nation
- Comanche Nation
- Osage Nation
- Quapaw Nation
- Seneca–Cayuga Nation
- Shawnee Nation

== Logistics ==
After abandoning its forts in the Indian Territory early in the Civil War, the Union Army was unprepared for the logistical challenges of trying to regain control of the territory from the Confederate government. The area was largely undeveloped relative to its neighbors: roads were sparse and primitive, and railroads did not yet exist in the territory. Pro-Union Indians had abandoned their own farms because of raids by pro-Confederacy Indians and fled to Kansas or Missouri, seeking protection from better-organized Union forces there. The Union did not have enough troops to control the few roads, and it was not feasible to sustain a large military operation by living off the land. This was demonstrated in 1862 when General William Weer's "Indian Expedition" into the Indian Territory from Kansas met with disaster when food and supplies were quickly exhausted and Union supply trains failed to arrive.

== Military actions ==
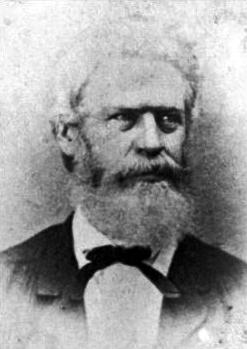
Colonel (later Brigadier General) Douglas H. Cooper commanded Confederate forces in the Indian Territory

The first battle in the territory occurred on November 19, 1861. Opothleyahola rallied Indians to the Union cause at Deep Fork. A total of 7,000 men, women, and children resided in his camp. A force of 1,400 Confederate soldiers under Colonel Douglas H. Cooper initiated the Battle of Round Mountain, but were repulsed after several waves, leading to a Southern defeat. Opothleyahola then moved his camp to a new location at Chustenalah. On December 26, 1861, Confederate forces again attacked, this time driving Opothleyahola and his people to Kansas during a snowstorm.

The decisive Union victory at the Battle of Pea Ridge in northwest Arkansas in March 1862 established federal control of Arkansas and Missouri and limited the Confederate government's ability to protect its Indian allies. Stand Watie, who fought at Pea Ridge, and other officers operating out of the Indian Territory had to fight on without support. The Union army recaptured its forts in the territory, but was forced to temporarily abandon them when faced with ongoing raids by Stand Watie; later the Union recaptured them again. Stand Watie was the last Confederate commander in the field to surrender.

=== Indian Expedition of 1862 ===
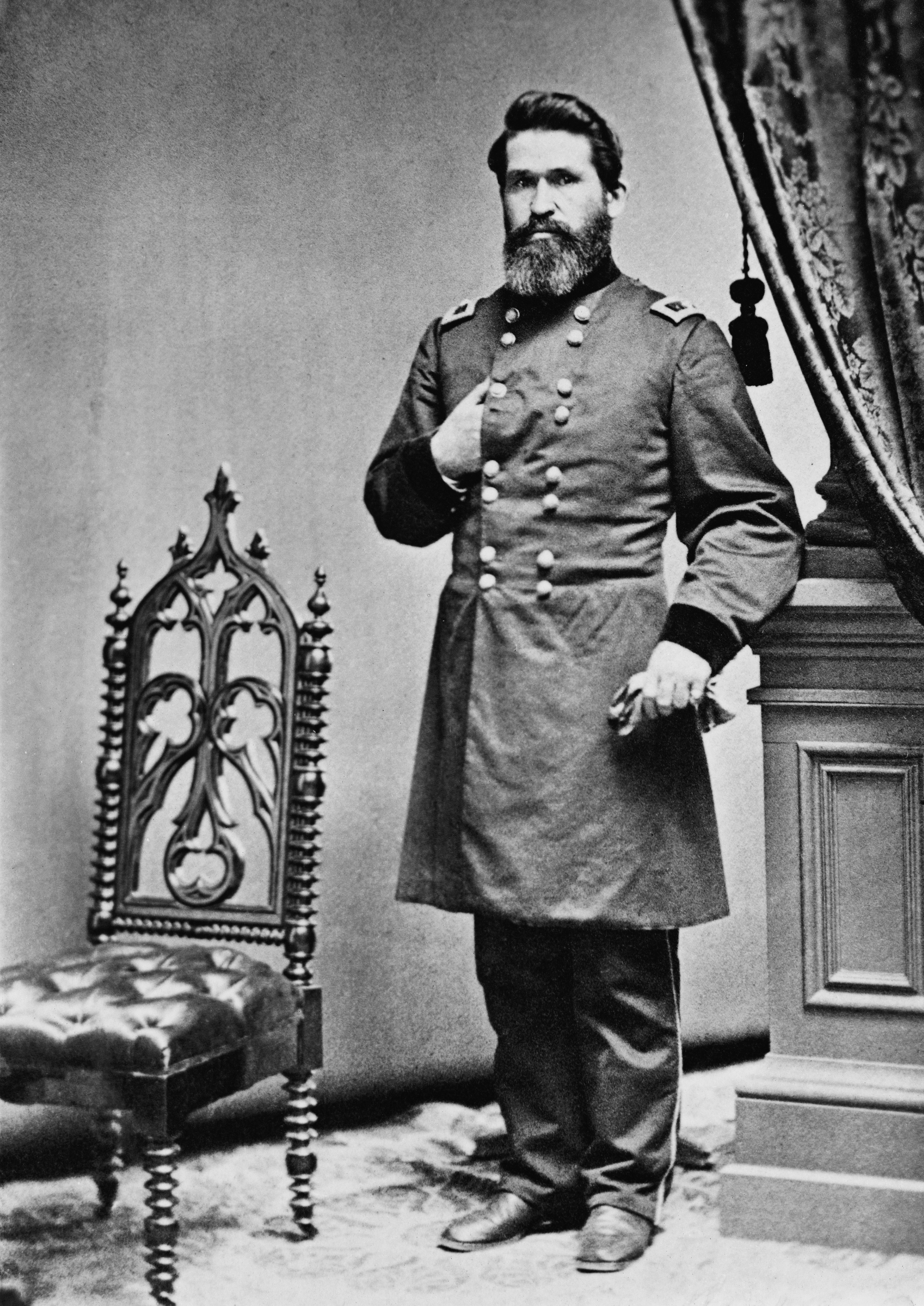
Major General James G. Blunt, commander of U.S. forces in the Indian Territory

In 1862, Union General James G. Blunt ordered Colonel William Weer to lead an expedition into the Indian Territory. (Note: Weer had been elevated to brigadier general in the Kansas militia in 1862, but was only a colonel of the 4th Kansas Volunteer Infantry at the time of the Indian Expedition.) The expedition included five white regiments, two Indian regiments and two artillery battalions, more than 5,000 men in all. The main objective of the expedition was to escort the Indian refugees who had fled to Kansas back to their homes in the Indian Territory; a secondary objective was to hold the territory for the Union. Weer's expedition departed from Baxter Springs, Kansas and met with early success at the Battle of Locust Grove in Indian Territory on July 3. The expedition camped at Locust Grove for two weeks, waiting for a Union supply train. One detachment from the main force moved on to Fort Gibson, causing the Confederates stationed there to withdraw. However, the Union supply train failed to arrive and supplies of food, forage and ammunition ran low. (Note: Ammunition had to be sent from Fort Leavenworth, while animal feed and other supplies had to be carried from Fort Scott, over 150 miles away from Weer's position. All of this had to come by wagon trains down the Texas Road.) Weer dithered about what to do next and found solace in drinking heavily. The men under his command soon mutinied, arresting Weer and putting Colonel Frederick Salomon in command and bringing the expedition to an end before making any further progress into Indian Territory. The expedition encouraged the organization of three Indian Home Guard regiments in support of the Union.

=== First Battle of Cabin Creek ===
Two military engagements were fought at the Cabin Creek Battlefield in the Cherokee Nation within Indian Territory. (Note: The site lies in present-day Craig and Mayes counties in northeastern Oklahoma.) The location was where the Texas Road (Note: The Texas Road was also known as the Osage Trace, Osage Trail, Immigrant Road and the Military Road.) crossed Cabin Creek, near the present-day town of Big Cabin, Oklahoma. Both the First and Second Battles of Cabin Creek were launched by the Confederate Army to disrupt Union Army supply trains bound from Fort Scott to Fort Gibson.

In the First Battle of Cabin Creek, which occurred July 1–2, 1863, the Union escort was led by Colonel James Monroe Williams. Williams was alerted to the attack and, despite the waters of the creek being swelled by rain, made a successful counterattack upon the entrenched Confederate position and forced them to flee. The battle was the first in which African-American troops fought side by side with their white comrades.

=== Battle of Honey Springs ===
Honey Springs Depot, a site of frequent skirmishes, was chosen by General James G. Blunt as the place to engage the largest Confederate forces in Indian Territory. Anticipating that Confederate forces under General Douglas H. Cooper would attempt to join with those under General William Cabell, who was moving to attack Fort Gibson, Blunt approached Honey Springs on July 17, 1863, with a force of 3,000 men, including Native Americans and African-American former slaves. On the morning of July 17, he engaged Cooper in the Battle of Honey Springs, who commanded a force of 3,000–6,000 men composed primarily of Native Americans. Cooper's troops became unorganized and retreated when wet gunpowder caused misfires and rain hampered their movements. The battle was the largest of the war in the Indian Territory. Following the battle, which essentially secured the Indian Territory for the Union, guerrilla warfare became the primary means of engagement between opposing forces in the territory.

=== Battle of Perryville ===
Perryville, a town halfway between Boggy Depot and Scullyville on the Texas Road, had become a major supply depot for the Confederate army. After the Battle of Honey Springs, General Cooper retreated to Perryville, where his troops could be resupplied. General Blunt, who had returned to Fort Gibson, learned that the Confederates had regrouped there and believed his troops could capture the depot and destroy Cooper's forces. Blunt reassembled a force and led them to Perryville. Arriving there on August 23, 1863, he found that the Confederate commanders, Cooper and Watie, had already left for Boggy Depot. Only a small rear guard, commanded by Brigadier General William Steele, remained at Perryville. Blunt attacked under cover of darkness and the two sides exchanged artillery fire. The Union forces quickly scattered the Confederates, who eventually retreated again, leaving their supplies behind. Blunt's forces captured whatever supplies they could use, then burned the town. Instead of following the retreating Confederates southwest toward Boggy Depot, Blunt proceeded to attack Fort Smith, which he captured on September 1, 1863.

=== Battle of Middle Boggy ===
On February 13, 1864, a force of about 350 Union troops supported by two howitzers attacked a Confederate outpost in the Indian Territory. The outpost was guarded by about 90 poorly armed Confederate soldiers. The outpost was located where the Dragoon Road crossed the Middle Boggy River. The Confederates resisted, holding off the Union troops for about half an hour, then fled on foot toward Fort Washita. The Union Army claimed victory because 49 Confederates were killed, while the Union forces suffered no deaths. The encounter had no strategic impact on the outcome of the Civil War. This was the last significant skirmish of the war in Indian Territory. It was a defeat for the Confederates, but the mistreatment of civilians and killings of wounded soldiers by the Union troops strengthened the resolve of Confederates and their sympathizers to continue the fight.

=== Second Battle of Cabin Creek ===
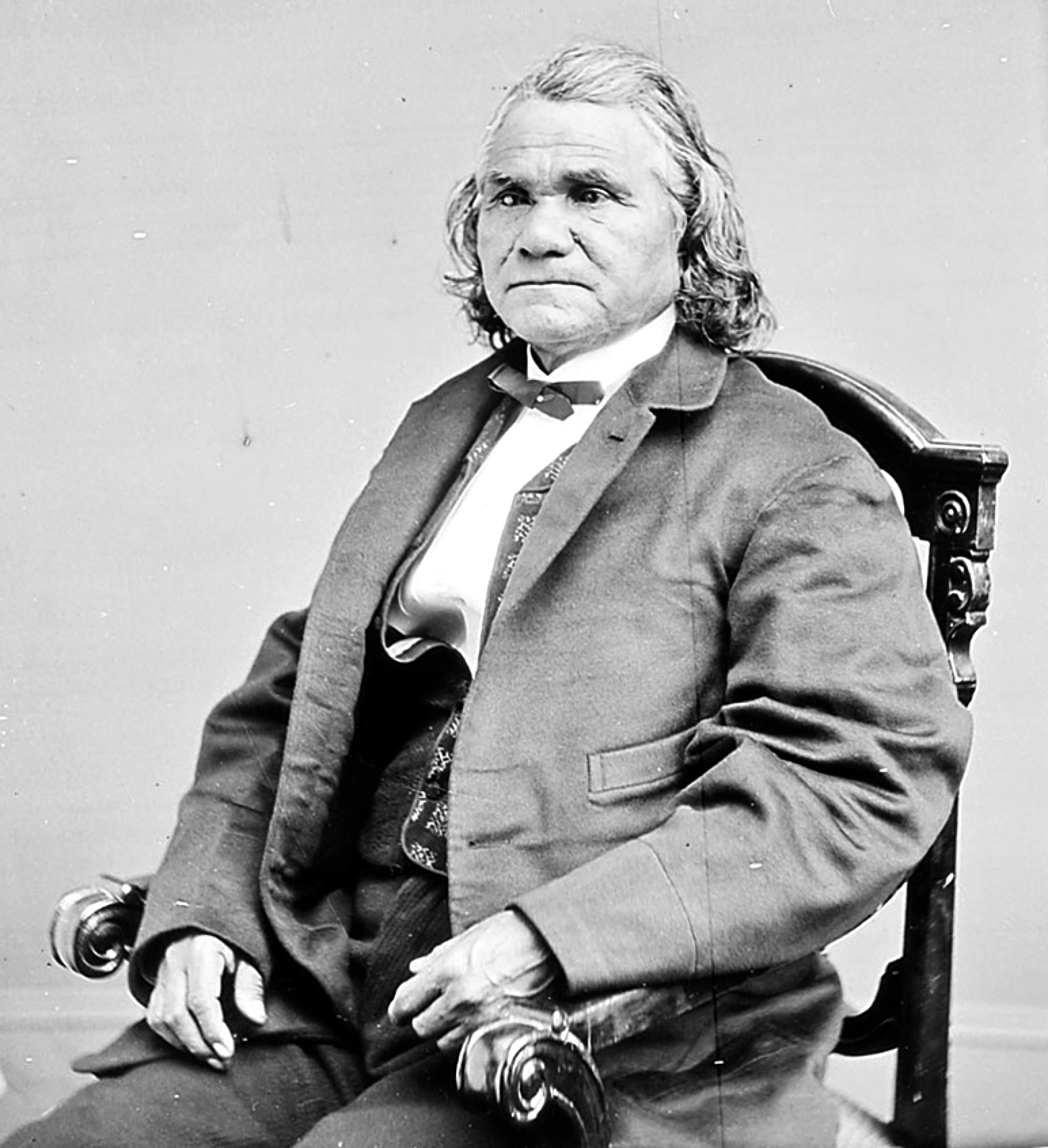
Brigadier General Stand Watie, the last Confederate general to surrender

The Second Battle of Cabin Creek was part of a plan conceived by Confederate Brigadier General Stand Watie, who had been promoted from colonel after the First Battle of Cabin Creek. The plan was to have a Confederate force attack central Kansas from Indian Territory, raiding Union Army facilities and encouraging Indian tribes in western Kansas to join in an attack on the eastern part of the state. Watie presented the plan to his superior, General Samuel B. Maxey, on February 5, 1864. Maxey approved the plan on the condition that the attack would start by October 1, to coincide with an attack on Missouri already planned by General Sterling Price.

=== Guerrilla warfare ===
From 1864 until the early summer of 1865, hostilities in the Indian Territory consisted mainly of guerrilla attacks. Confederate Captain William Quantrill and his gang committed a number of raids throughout the lands of the Five Civilized Tribes. (Note: Quantrill's gang later broke up into smaller groups. Quantrill himself was killed while leading a raid in western Kentucky in July 1865.) Armed gangs known as "free raiders" mostly stole horses and cattle, while burning the communities of both Confederate and Indian supporters. (Note: The free raiders were mostly outcasts from the Five Civilized Tribes.) A third type of marauder was the Confederate Army unit led by General Stand Watie, which attacked only objectives having military value. They destroyed only houses and barns used by Union troops as headquarters, for quartering troops or for storing supplies. Watie also targeted military supply trains because that not only deprived the Union troops of food, forage and ammunition but gave significant amounts of other booty that he could distribute to his men. One of Watie's most notable successes during this time was the ambush of the steamboat J.R. Williams in September 1864. Watie surrendered, along with his troops, at Doaksville on June 23, 1865.

== Aftermath ==
42 years after the end of the Civil War, Indian Territory entered the Union as the State of Oklahoma. However, American Indians would not become full U.S. citizens until 17 years later.

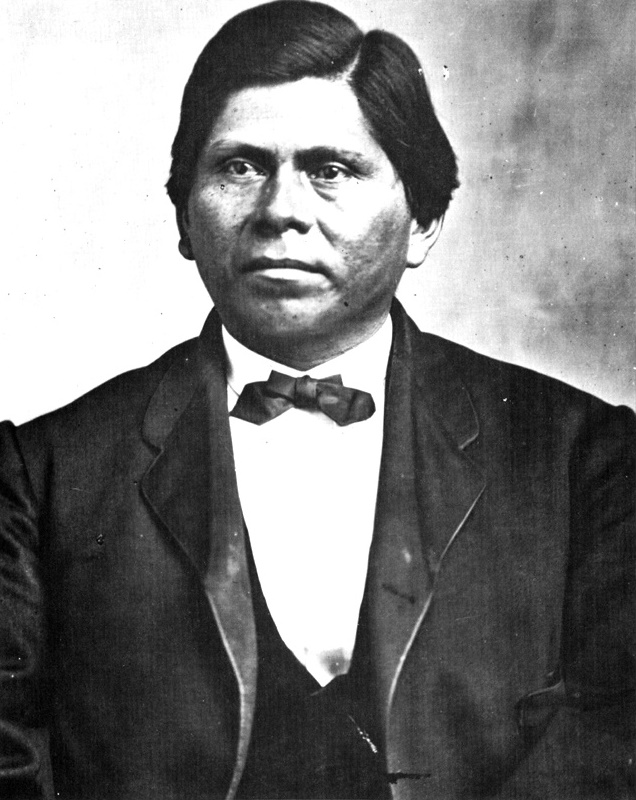
Allen Wright (Choctaw) sought reconciliation and led his tribe's delegation to sign the Treaty of 1866.

At Fort Towson in Choctaw lands, General Stand Watie officially became the last Confederate general to surrender on June 25, 1865. Watie went to Washington, D.C. later that year for negotiations on behalf of his tribe; as the principal chief of the pro-Confederacy group elected in 1862, he was seeking recognition of a Southern Cherokee Nation. He did not return home until May 1866. The US government negotiated only with the Cherokee who had supported the Union; it named John Ross as the rightful principal chief (he had gone into exile in 1862 when the majority supported the Confederacy).

As part of the Reconstruction Treaties, U.S. officials forced land concessions upon the tribes; it also required the Cherokee and other tribes to emancipate their slaves and give them full rights as members of their respective tribes, including rights to annuities and land allocations. The Southern Cherokee had wanted the U.S. government to pay to relocate Cherokee Freedmen from the tribe. Later the issue of citizenship caused contention when American Indian lands were allotted to households under the Dawes Commission. In the early 20th century, the Cherokee Nation voted to exclude the Freedmen from the tribe, unless they also had direct descent from a Cherokee (not just a Cherokee Freedman) listed on the Dawes Rolls (1902–1906).

== See also ==
- Cherokee in the American Civil War
- Choctaw in the American Civil War
- Seminole in the American Civil War
- Native Americans in the American Civil War
- Confederate Units of Indian Territory
- Indian Home Guard (American Civil War)
- Trans-Mississippi Theater of the American Civil War
- Conclusion of the American Civil War
- History of Oklahoma
- Oklahoma Territory
