= List of Confederate units from Indian Territory in the American Civil War =

Confederate Units of Indian Territory consisted of Native Americans from the Five Civilized Tribes — the Cherokee, Chickasaw, Choctaw, Creek, and Seminole nations. The 1st Cherokee Mounted Rifles were commanded by the highest ranking Native American of the war: Brig. Gen. Stand Watie, who also became the last Confederate General to surrender on June 23, 1865. There was also a series of Union units of Indian Territory.

== Cherokee Nation ==
- 1st Cherokee Mounted Rifles
- 1st Regiment of Cherokee Mounted Volunteers
- 2nd Regiment of Cherokee Mounted Volunteers
- 3rd Cherokee Regiment of Volunteer Cavalry
- Cherokee Regiment (Special Services), CSA
- 1st Cherokee Battalion of Partisan Rangers
- 2nd Cherokee Artillery
- Cherokee Special Services Battalion
- Scales' Battalion of Cherokee Cavalry
- Meyer's Battalion of Cherokee Cavalry
- Cherokee Battalion of Infantry
- 1st Squadron of Cherokee Mounted Volunteers

== Creek Nation ==
- 1st Regiment Creek Mounted Volunteers
- 2nd Regiment Creek Mounted Volunteers
- 1st Battalion Creek Confederate Cavalry

== Seminole Nation ==
- 1st Regiment Seminole Mounted Volunteers
- 1st Battalion Seminole Mounted Volunteers

== Chickasaw Nation ==
- 1st Regiment of Chickasaw Infantry
- 1st Regiment of Chickasaw Cavalry
- 1st Battalion of Chickasaw Cavalry
- Shecoe's Chickasaw Battalion of Mounted Volunteers

== Choctaw Nation ==
- 1st Choctaw & Chickasaw Mounted Rifles
- 1st Regiment of Choctaw Mounted Rifles
- 2nd Regiment of Choctaw Cavalry
- 3rd Regiment of Choctaw Cavalry
- Deneale's Regiment of Choctaw Warriors
- Folsom's Battalion of Choctaw Mounted Rifles
- Capt. John Wilkin's Company of Choctaw Infantry

== Northwest Frontier Command of Indian Territory ==
(Col. Roswell W. Lee, Commanding)

- 1st Osage Battalion
- Major George Washington's Frontier Battalion
- Major James W. Cooper's Battalion

== See also ==
- Indian Territory in the American Civil War
- Lists of American Civil War Regiments by State
- Confederate Units by State
