= Cherokee in the American Civil War =

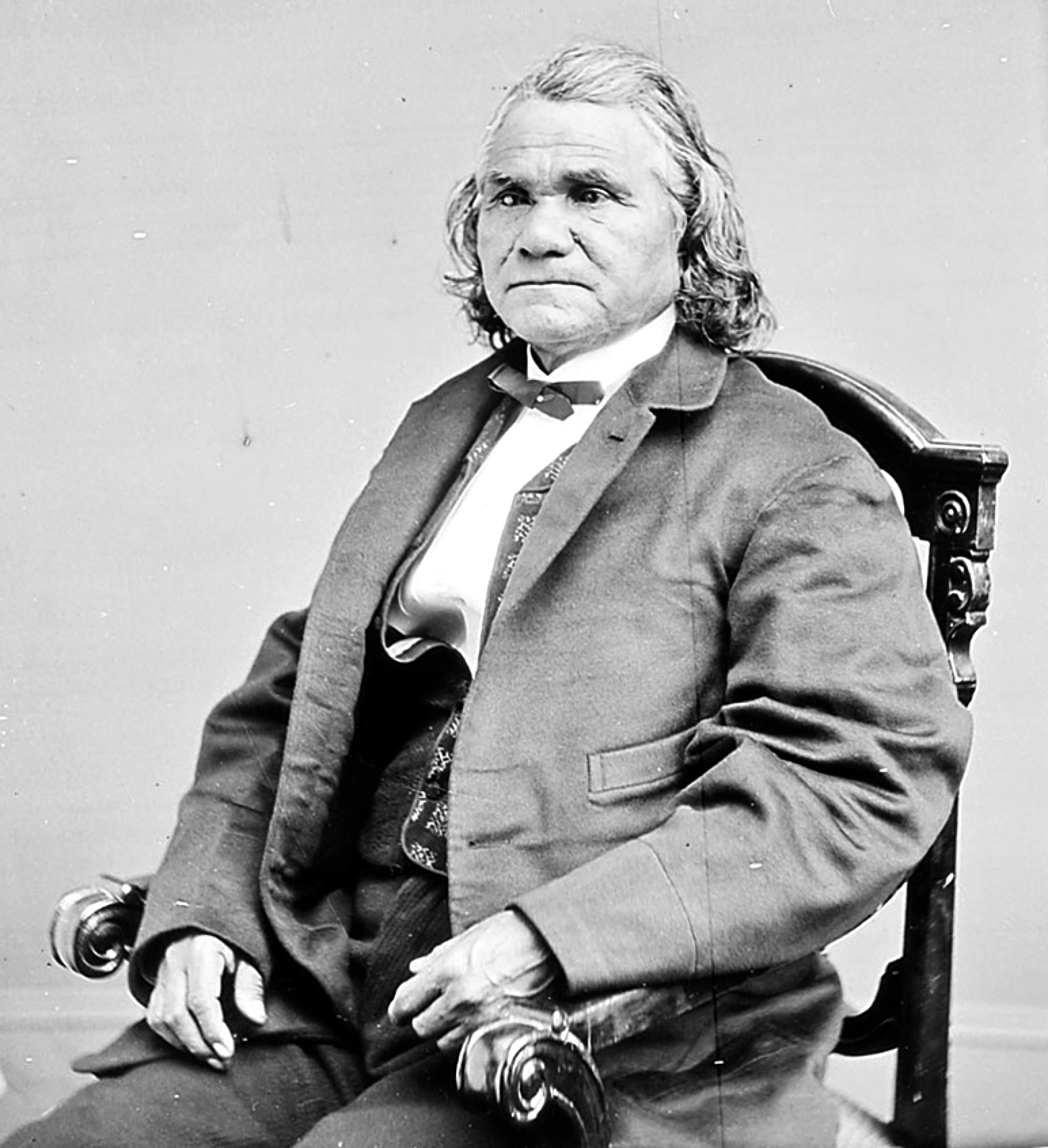
Confederate Brigadier General Stand Watie, the only Native American to reach the rank of general in the Confederate Army in the Civil War.

During the course of the American Civil War, the Cherokee people fought for both the Union and the Confederacy. Alignment was hotly contested within the Cherokee Nation: factions such as The Gold Cloak Society (composed mainly of mixed slave owners) supported the confederacy, while members of the Keetoowah Society organized in opposition to that support. At the war's outbreak The Cherokee Nation's Principal Chief John Ross insisted upon the nation's neutrality. However, under pressure, The Cherokee Nation would briefly ally with the confederacy.

Cherokees were active in the Trans-Mississippi and Western Theaters. In the east, Confederate Cherokees led by William Holland Thomas hindered Union forces trying to use the Appalachian mountain passes of western North Carolina and eastern Tennessee. Out west, Confederate Cherokee Stand Watie led primarily Native Confederate forces in the Indian Territory, in what is now the state of Oklahoma.

== Background ==
Before Indian removal, the Cherokee Nation was centered in and around the Blue Ridge Mountains—southwestern North Carolina, southeastern Tennessee, western South Carolina and northeastern Georgia. The Cherokee attempted to address their grievances by taking their problems to the American Federal judicial system. In 1830, a delegation led by Chief John Ross defended Cherokee rights before the U.S. Supreme Court in Cherokee Nation v. Georgia. The Indian cases set a precedent in Indian Country but the United States still enforced removal of most of the Cherokee Nation to west of the Mississippi River, along what became known as the Trail of Tears. After the removals, the Cherokee Nation was based west of the Mississippi River. Some Cherokee remained in the Blue Ridge Mountains.

The Cherokee blamed the federal government and former United States President Andrew Jackson for the Trail of Tears. They had adopted "Southern ways" before their removal from the Southeast. Cherokee society held slavery as a primary institution throughout the pre-war period, instituting laws that explicitly prohibited primarily "black (or negro) slaves" from obtaining citizenship in their nation, and later "persons of color" altogether. Cherokee judiciary and legislative bodies promulgated similar laws regarding race and enslaved status as the Cherokee attempted to legally define themselves as equal to whites or European Americans, at the expense and exclusion of non-white and non-Indian groups, and in particular Blacks. The Cherokee aligned with the Confederacy in part due to their existing cultural, trading, and legal affinities with those states that had seceded. In addition, the Cherokee in Indian Territory opposed William Seward's campaigning in 1860 on behalf of Abraham Lincoln, when he said that Lincoln would open the Indian Territory for white settlement.

=== Creation of a Bureau of Indian Affairs ===
In early 1861, the Confederate States of America emerged, prompting a request for the establishment of a Bureau of Indian Affairs, with Albert Pike appointed as Commissioner for tribes west of Arkansas and south of Kansas.

Pike, a proponent of securing Indian Territory for the CSA, facilitated treaties with various tribes by mid-1861. Confederate President Jefferson Davis referred to a now-lost Act for the protection of certain tribes, outlining future policy. Pike's negotiations led to the Treaty with the Creek Nation in July 1861, followed by agreements with eight more tribes, concluding with the Cherokee in October of that year.

== Trans-Mississippi Theater ==
The Cherokee Braves Flag, as flown by Cherokee General Stand Watie.

Chief of the Cherokee John Ross was adamant that the Union was not dissolved. However, a highly influential member of the Cherokee Nation, Stand Watie, supported the Confederate cause, and on June 1, 1861, began recruiting for all-Indian units that became part of the Confederate army. Full-blooded Cherokee tended to support Ross (who was primarily Scottish) while the mixed-blooded Cherokee supported the 3/4 Cherokee Stand Watie. Stand Watie in 1862 was elected Chief of the newly declared Southern Cherokee Nation. In this context, "full-blooded" and "mixed-blooded" are not racial categories, but rather a cultural and class distinction, with the primarily Cherokee-speaking, nationalist, and anti-slavery lower class considered "full-blooded", and the largely English-speaking, assimilationist, and slaveholding aristocracy considered "mixed-blooded".

For the duration of the war, a series of small battles and constant guerrilla warfare were waged by Cherokee in the Indian Territory. Stand Watie officially became the last Confederate general to end fighting on June 25, 1865, at Fort Towson, in the southeast portion of the Indian Territory.

=== Organization ===
During the Civil War, the Cherokee Nation had approximately 21,000 members with 3,000 of them serving in the Confederacy as soldiers.

- First Cherokee Mounted Rifles
- 1st Regiment of Cherokee Mounted Volunteers
- 2nd Regiment of Cherokee Mounted Volunteers
- 3rd Cherokee Regiment of Volunteer Cavalry
- Cherokee Regiment (Special Services), CSA
- 1st Cherokee Battalion of Partisan Rangers
- 2nd Cherokee Artillery
- Cherokee Special Services Battalion
- Scales' Battalion of Cherokee Cavalry
- Meyer's Battalion of Cherokee Cavalry
- Cherokee Battalion of Infantry
- 1st Squadron of Cherokee Mounted Volunteers

=== Battles and Skirmishes ===
- Battle of Wilson's Creek (August 10, 1861)
- Battle of Bird Creek (December 9, 1861)
- Battle of Chustenahlah (December 26, 1861)
- Battle of Pea Ridge (March 6–8, 1862)
- Battle of Prairie Grove (December 7, 1862)
- Battle of Honey Springs (July 17, 1863)
- First Battle of Cabin Creek (July 1, 1863 – July 2, 1863)
- Ambush of the steamboat J. R. Williams (June 15, 1864)
- Battle of Fort Smith (July 31, 1864)
- Second Battle of Cabin Creek (September 19, 1864)

== Western Theater ==
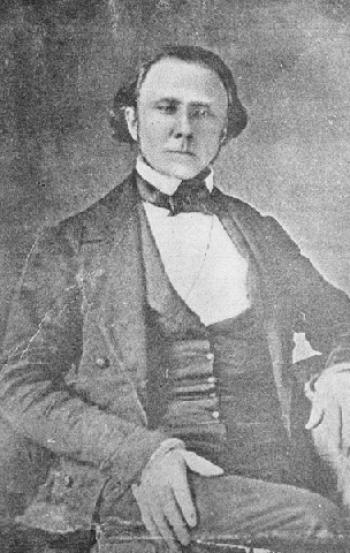
William Holland Thomas was the commander of the well-known legion.

Thomas' Legion, led by William H. Thomas, a European-American who was adopted Cherokee, were originally stationed outside Knoxville, Tennessee at Strawberry Plains, Tennessee. Their primary duty was to protect the Alum Cave, and harass Union troops that invaded Tennessee. While briefly working around Chattanooga, Tennessee in June 1862, Thomas personally captured a Union Soldier, after which each of his men vowed to capture at least one "Yankee" before the war was over.

The Legion would become infamous due to their actions on September 15, 1862. While trying to stop a Union advance through Baptist Gap, a popular leader among the Cherokee, Astoogahtogeh, was killed leading a charge. Enraged, the remaining Cherokee were driven to avenge him. In retaliation for Astoogahtogeh's death, the Cherokee scalped the dead Union soldiers after the battle. After the event was reported in newspapers, Union soldiers would fear the Cherokee, but Thomas feared for the reputation of the Cherokee, as he did not want his people to be seen as barbaric. The scalps were sent to be buried with the soldiers they originally came from.

After a number of Thomas' men were captured in February 1864, some were convinced by the Union that they were fighting for slavery, and thereafter fought for the Union. Others convinced their captors they also would defect to the Union side, but instead returned to Thomas and told him Union officials offered $5,000 for Thomas' scalp. After this, many of his men were sent to fight in Virginia, some of whom were present at Appomattox Court House for General Robert E. Lee's surrender. The rest of the Legion continued to fight until surrendering along with the commanding officer of the District of Western North Carolina to the Union commander they had captured on 10 May 1865.

=== Organization ===
In May 1861, William H. Thomas began recruiting Cherokees from the Quallatown, North Carolina area. The first two companies were mostly composed of Indian soldiers. Early in the war, the Cherokees' unit was called the Junaluska Zouaves. Thomas' Confederates were sometimes referred to as Thomas' Legion or Thomas' Legion of Cherokee Indians and Highlanders. They were later designated as the 69th North Carolina Regiment.

- 69th North Carolina Regiment
  - Field & Staff: Colonel William H. Thomas, Lieutenant Colonel James R. Love, Major William W. Stringfield, Luther C. May (Adjutant), James W. Terrell (A.Q.M.), John W. Lawing (Surgeon), and Hezekiah West (Chaplain)
  - Companies: Company A (Captain James W. Terrell), Company B (Captain G. M. Hanks), Company C (Captain Elisha G. Johnson), Company D (Captain William B. Love), Company E (Captain Julius M. Welch), Company F (Captain J. M. McConnell), Company G (Captain Daniel G. Fisher), Company H (Captain Thomas J. Cooper, Captain James W. Cooper), Company I (Captain Willis Parker, Captain Joseph A. Kinsey), Company K (Captain Thomas A. Butler)
  - Total: 1,125 men

=== Battles and Skirmishes ===
- Skirmish at Baptist Gap (September 1862)
- Battle of Deep Creek (February 2, 1864)

== Aftermath ==
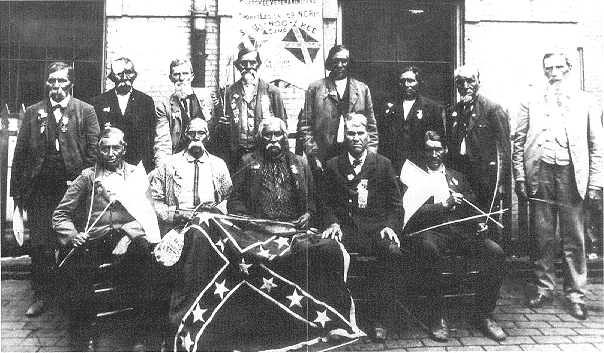
Cherokee Confederates reunion in New Orleans, 1903.

In comparison to the other signatories, the Cherokee were especially keen in remaining neutral, but this opposition became untenable as Union troops abandoned positions in Cherokee territory, and outside pressure mounted. The ninth and final "treaty of friendship and alliance" was signed on October 7, 1861, in Tahlequah. Financial concerns were crucial for many of these tribes, as abrogating federal treaties would result in the loss of an income stream, much alone the forfeiture of principal amounts obtained via past talks.

In the west, at the end of the war, with the Union victorious, the Union Cherokee established policies that confiscated land from the Confederate Cherokee. The Federal government promised the Confederate Cherokee that the laws promoting the confiscation would be annulled. This was due to Indian Commissioner D.N. Cooley, who saw opportunities in splitting the factions of the Cherokee, as represented by Ross and Watie. Cooley even went as far as to portray Ross as a traitor, when Ross had always been a Union advocate. The Cherokee were forced to adopt their slaves into the tribe, and to allow settlement of their lands by whites. In effect, due to the Cherokee split and the maneuverings of Cooley, the Cherokee suffered the worst of Reconstruction.

=== Monuments ===
Monuments were dedicated for the Cherokee's wartime participation in the early 20th century.

== See also ==
- Indian Territory in the American Civil War
- Native Americans in the American Civil War
- Cherokee military history
- Southern Cherokee Nation of Kentucky
- Indian Home Guard
