= John Ritchie (abolitionist) =

American abolitionist (1817–1887)

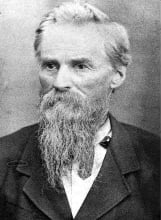
- Portrait of Ritchie

Personal details
- Born: July 17, 1817 Uniontown, Ohio, U.S.
- Died: August 31, 1887 (aged 70) Topeka, Kansas, U.S.

Military service
- Allegiance: United States
- Branch/service: Union Army
- Years of service: 1861–1865
- Rank: Brigadier general

John Ritchie (July 17, 1817 – August 31, 1887) was an American abolitionist in Kansas who served in the Union Army as a brigadier general during the American Civil War.

== Early life ==
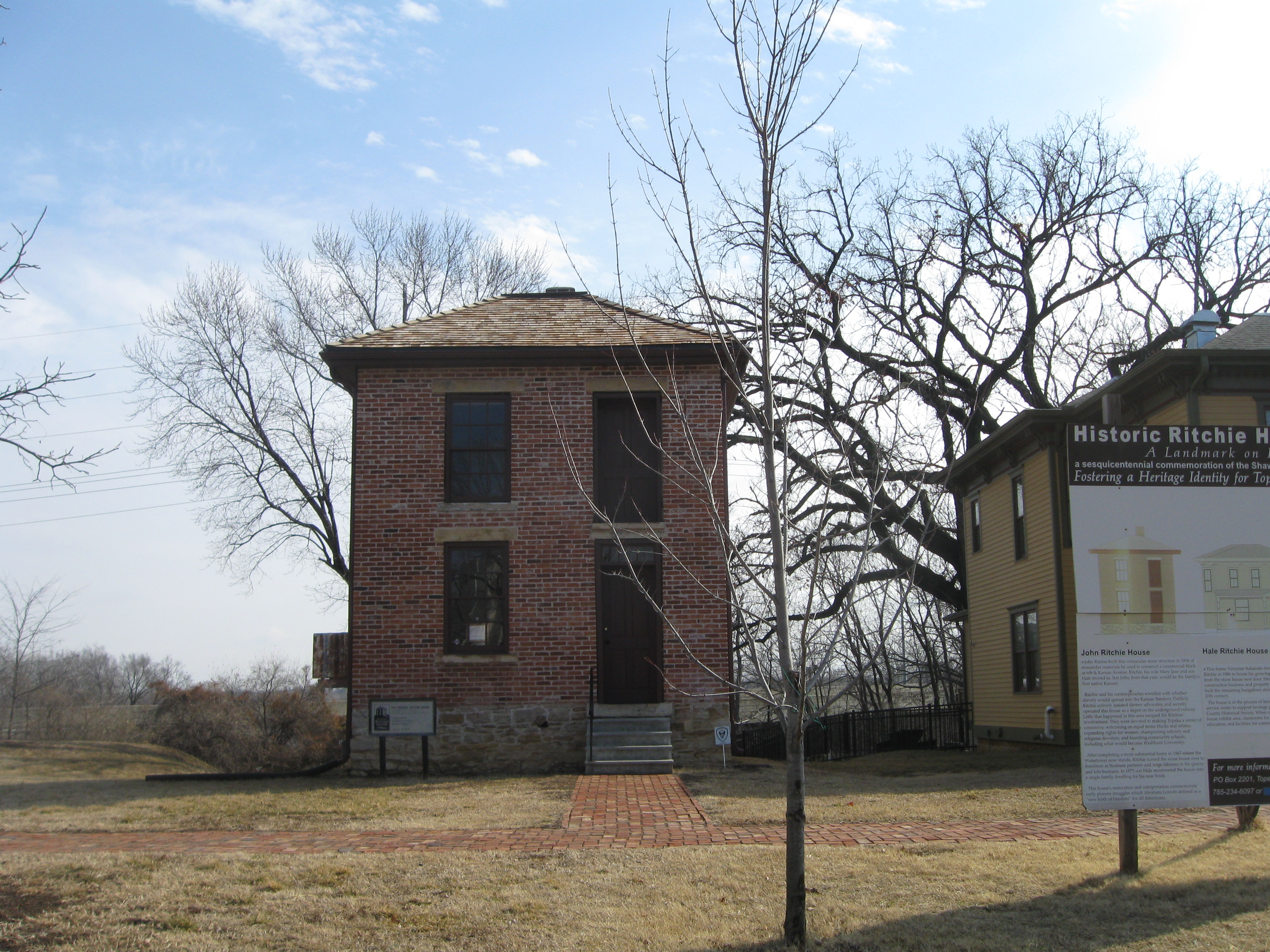
The John Ritchie House in Topeka, Kansas

Ritchie moved from Franklin, Indiana to Topeka, Kansas Territory, in early spring of 1855 in search of cheap land and to help Kansas enter the country as a free state. His wife, Mary Jane Shelledy Ritchie, was the fifth woman to settle in Topeka and their young son, Hale was the third child. As early settlers they lived in a dugout through the first winter and around 1856 had constructed and moved into a limestone house that still stands in Topeka today, located at 1116 SE Madison. He was selected to serve as a delegate in two of the four Kansas constitutional conventions: Leavenworth (1858) and Wyandotte (1859).

Ritchie was part of the Bleeding Kansas episode in history and was engaged in various acts opposing the expansion of slavery in Kansas Territory. Ritchie was a close associate and supporter of the notorious politician James H. Lane. Ritchie was associated with the "Topeka Boys" and operated a "station" on the Underground Railroad. In January 1859, Ritchie helped John Brown and eleven slaves elude federal troops and escape to Nebraska.

== Civil War ==
He enlisted in the Union Army at the outset of the American Civil War and, with the support of Lane, became lieutenant colonel of the 5th Regiment Kansas Volunteer Cavalry and later as the colonel of the 2nd Regiment, Indian Home Guard. He received a brevet promotion to brigadier general on February 21, 1865.

After the Civil War a number of newly freed African Americans settled in Topeka both before and during the exodus movement and built homes on land that Ritchie sold or gave them. Because of the sizable African-American population, the Topeka School District decided to establish a school for black children in the neighborhood. "Ritchie's Addition" became the site of Monroe School, which became the Kansas school at the center of the fight against segregated public schools in Brown v. Board of Education.

== Ritchie Cemetery ==
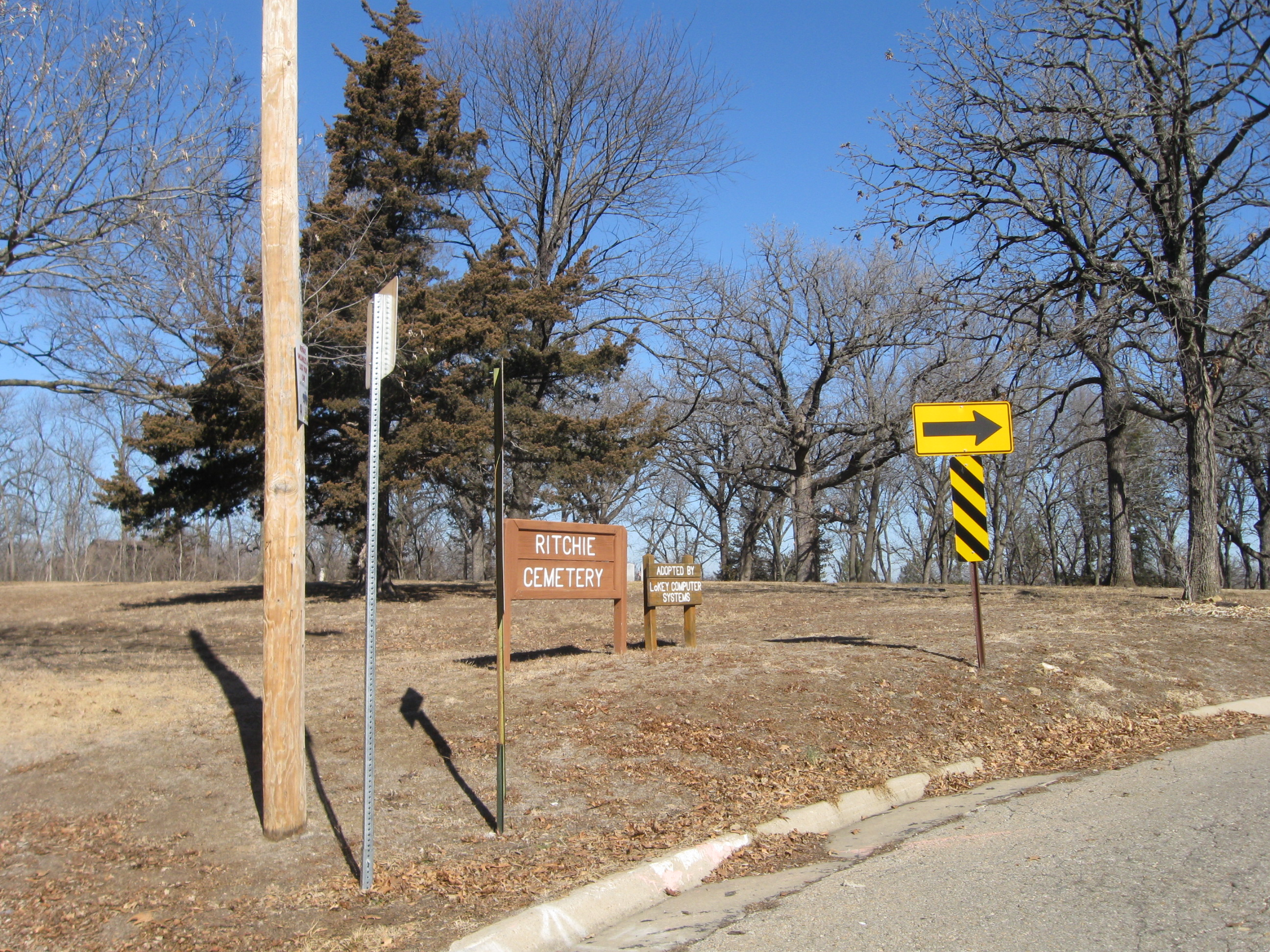
Ritchie Cemetery

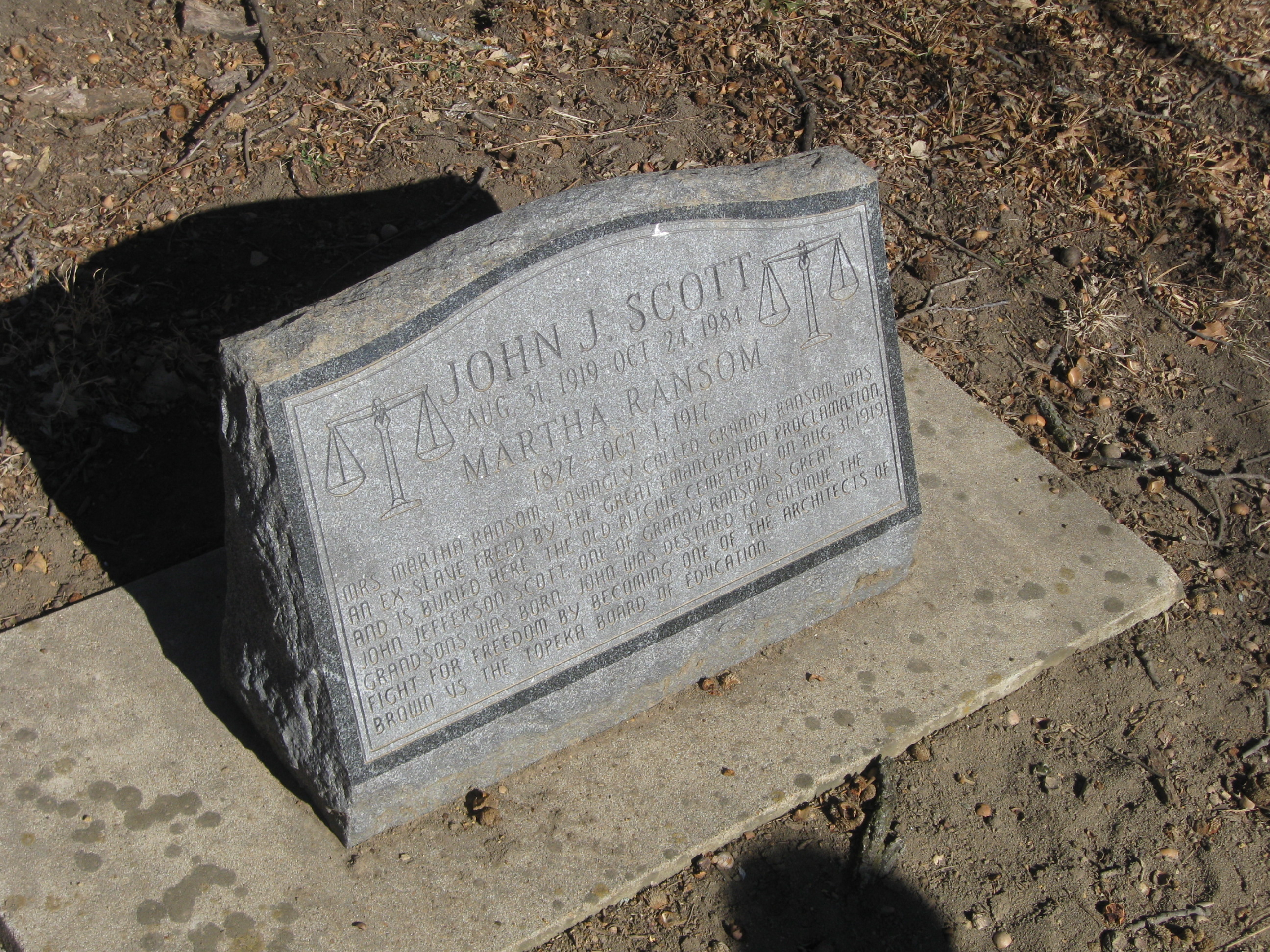
Grave in the Ritchie Cemetery

Ritchie also donated property as a free cemetery where those too poor to purchase lots at the Topeka Cemetery could bury their dead loved ones. It is believed that there are around 100 graves within the cemetery, most unmarked, which is located at 27th and Boswell Ave. in Topeka. His wife, Mary Jane, and their young daughter were both originally buried there, however upon John Ritchie's death at age 70, his son Hale had his father buried in the Topeka Cemetery and his mother and sister's remains moved there as well.

== Washburn University ==
Ritchie purchased 160 acres (0.65 km^{2}) of land in Topeka which he donated to establish a larger campus for Lincoln College, which became Washburn College and is currently known as Washburn University. Ritchie was a champion of women's rights, making motions at the Wyandotte Constitutional Convention to include women's rights. Susan B. Anthony and Elizabeth Cady Stanton stayed with the Ritchie family when they were in Topeka to speak at the state capitol.

== Sources ==
- William G. Cutler, History of the State of Kansas. Chicago, Illinois: A.T. Andreas, 1883.
- Mary Evelyn Ritchie, Ritchie/Shelledy Family History: Our People Who Came To Kansas Territory in 1855.
- John Ritchie: Portrait of an Uncommon Man. Shawnee County Historical Society Bulletin.
- Mrs. H.C. Root, "Paper on the life of John Ritchie", April 27, 1903.

https://web.archive.org/web/20121014034455/http://skyways.lib.ks.us/orgs/schs/ritchie/education/resources/ritchiebookparts/JR-UndergroundRailroad.pdf
