= Battle of Fort Smith =

1864 battle of the American Civil War

- Part of the American Civil War
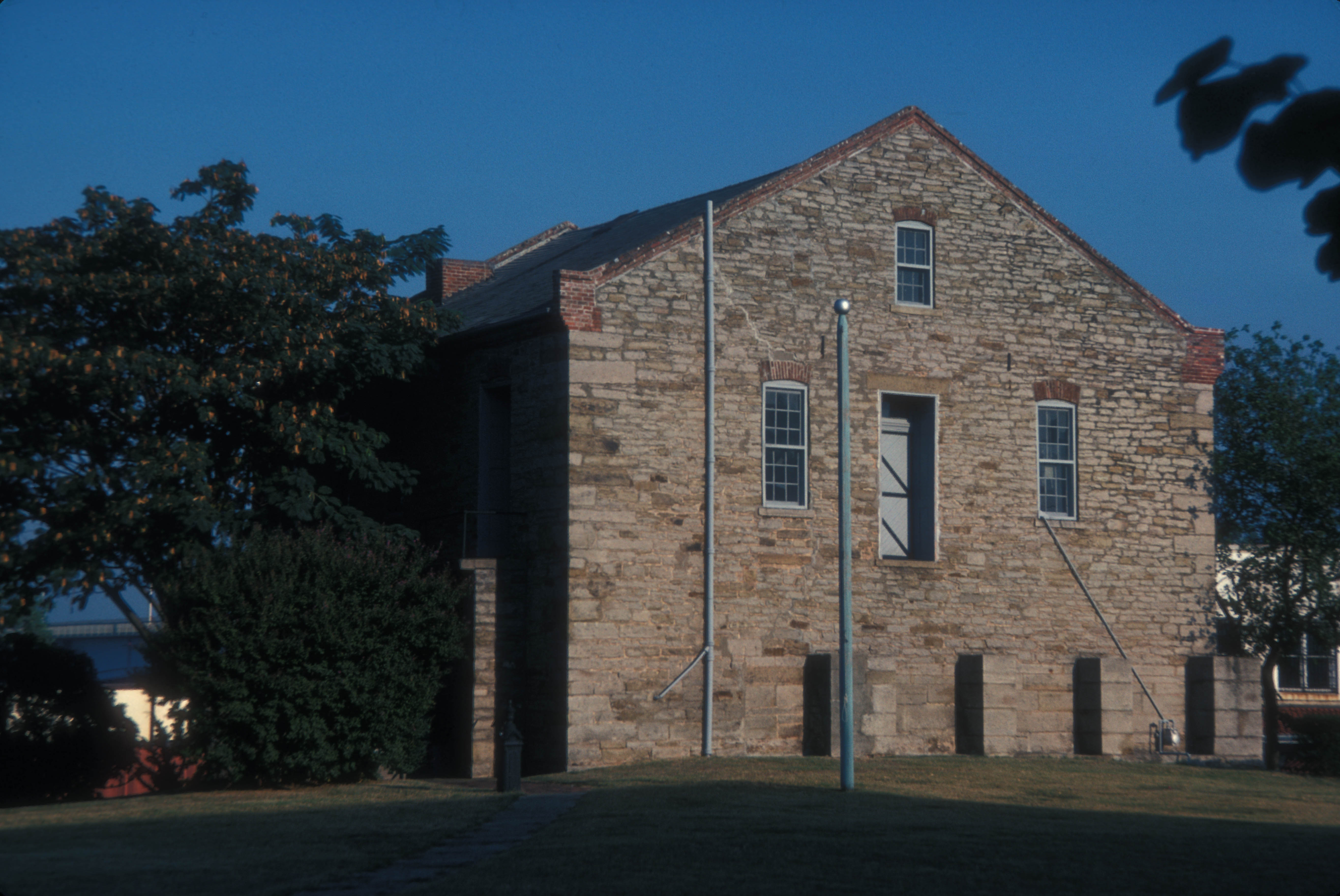
- Fort Smith Commissary
| Date | July 31, 1864 |
| Location | Sebastian County, Arkansas 35°23′11.7″N 94°25′57.6″W |
| Result | Union victory |

Belligerents
| United States (Union) | Confederate States |

Commanders and leaders
| (United States) John M. Thayer | (Confederate States of America) Douglas H. Cooper |

Units involved
| District of the Frontier | District of the Indian Territory |

Strength
| 3 brigades | 2 brigades |

Casualties and losses
| 4 killed 6 wounded 11 captured | 2 killed 4 wounded |

The Battle of Fort Smith was fought on July 31, 1864, in Sebastian County, Arkansas, during the American Civil War.

== Background ==
In the wake of the failed Camden Expedition, areas of Arkansas lay prone to cavalry raids against Union outposts. One such raid occurred at Massard Prairie on July 27, 1864 where Confederate forces under Brigadier-General Richard M. Gano won a victory, encouraging further engagement.

== Opposing Forces ==
=== Union ===
- District of the Frontier – Brig. Gen. John M. Thayer
  - 1st Brigade – Col. John Edwards
  - 2nd Brigade – Col. James M. Williams
  - 3rd Brigade – Col. William R. Judson

=== Confederate ===
- District of the Indian Territory – BG Douglas H. Cooper
  - 5th Texas Cavalry Brigade – Brig. Gen. Richard M. Gano
  - 1st Indian Brigade – Brig. Gen. Stand Watie

== Battle ==
Several days later Gano's superior, Brigadier-General Douglas H. Cooper, led a Confederate division several miles north to Fort Smith. Cooper's force consisted of Gano's brigade and Watie's brigade. Gano took position along the Indian Territory side of the Poteau River while Watie moved up from the south on the Arkansas side. Brigadier-General John M. Thayer commanded the town's defenses with three brigades. Watie's men made first contact with the 6th Kansas Cavalry of Colonel William R. Judson's brigade. Judson's men fell back from Fort No. 2 along the Texas Road, alerting the rest of the Union garrison of the Confederate arrival. Cooper's men began to shell the fort. Thayer responded by sending forward units from Williams' brigade, including the 6th Kansas Colored Infantry and two howitzers from the 2nd Kansas Battery. The Union artillery proved superior and soon drove off the Confederates. Cooper ordered a withdrawal, leaving snipers behind to cover the retreat.

== Aftermath ==
Cooper took with him approximately $130,000 worth of Union arms and supplies. Thayer maintained control of Fort Smith for the duration of the war. Fort Smith is preserved within Fort Smith National Historic Site.

== See also ==
- List of American Civil War battles
- Troop engagements of the American Civil War, 1864
