= Seminole in the American Civil War =

The Seminole in the American Civil War were found in both the Trans-Mississippi and Western Theaters. The Seminole Nation in the Trans-Mississippi Theater had split alliances. However, the majority of the tribe in the Western territories joined the Union Army under the leadership of Billy Bowlegs. (Note: Sonuk Mikko is sometimes confused with Holata Micco.) Others, such as John Jumper, supported the Confederacy. The Florida Seminole participated in some skirmishing in central Florida. They were likely at the Battle of Olustee in February 1864.

== Trans-Mississippi Theater ==
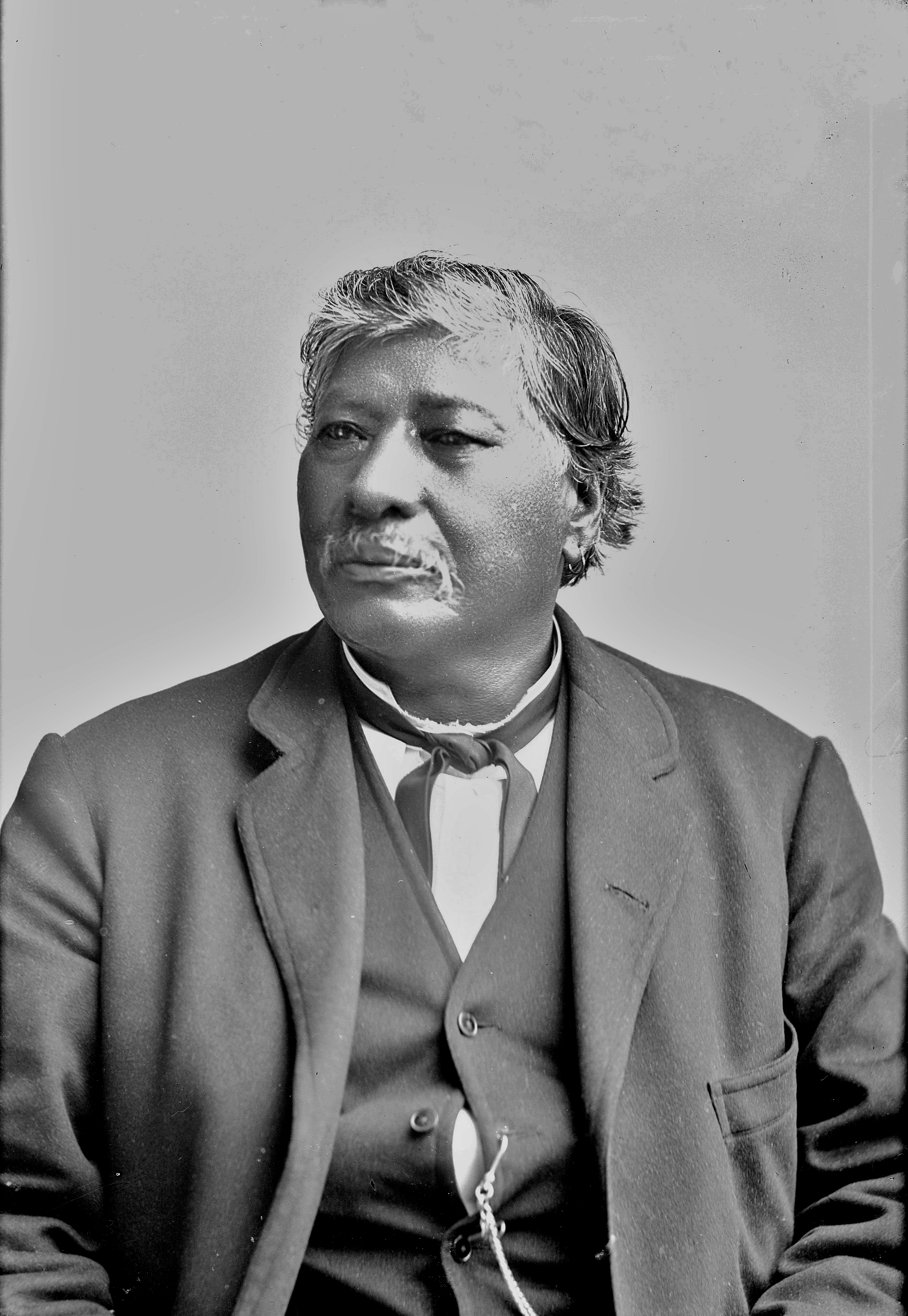
John Jumper (Hemha Micco) was a colonel of the Confederate Army during the American Civil War.

In 1884, The Philadelphia Inquirer stated that nearly all of the Seminoles "espoused the cause of the Union" and because all of the neighboring tribes (Choctaws, Chickasaws, Cherokees, and Creeks) "almost unanimously joined the Southern Confederacy, it was neither agreeable nor safe for the Seminoles to continue living in the Indian Territory." As the Seminole fled south, across the U.S.-Mexican border, "they were attacked by a Confederate regiment and their principal chieftain [Billy Bowlegs] killed." The remaining Seminoles crossed into Mexico and remained there until after the Civil War.

The Seminole Nation, those who didn't move to Mexico, was led by John Jumper. Jumper's Seminole name was "Hemha Micco." He was commissioned in the Confederacy as a major and then as an "honorary lieutenant colonel". He was in the battles of Round Mountain, Chusto-Talasah, Middle Boggy, and Second Cabin Creek.

=== Organization ===
The Seminole Nation organized into companies, battalions, and regiments.

- First Seminole Battalion (Mounted Volunteers)
  - The First Seminole Battalion was organized on September 21, 1861.
  - Field & Staff: Major John Jumper
  - Companies: Company A (Captain George Cloud) and Company B (Captain Fushatchie Cochokna)
- First Seminole Regiment (Mounted Volunteers)
  - The First Seminole Battalion re-organized as the 1st Seminole Regiment on July 1, 1864.
  - Field & Staff: Colonel John Jumper, Major George Cloud, Charles C. Dyer (A.Q.M.), D. R. Patterson (Adjutant), W. W. Burnes ( Assistant Surgeon), Hu McDonald (A.Q.M.)
  - Companies: Company A (Captain Thomas Cloud), Company B (Captain Fushatchie Cochokna), Company C (Captain James Factor), Company D (Captain Tustanucogee), Company E (Captain Sam Hill), and Company F (Captain Osuchee Harjo)

== Western Theater ==
In Florida, two distinct companies were raised who had Seminole Indians as members of the Confederate Army. Andrew E. Hodges, a white man who lived on the coast near Cedar Key, raised a company of Indian sharp shooters starting in 1862. Hodges' Company not only had Seminole Indians but whites, Hispanics, blacks, and other tribal members in his unit. Seminoles may have played a sharp shooter role at the Battle of Olustee. By July 1864, Hodges had passed his company to Andrew M. McBride. McBride was elected captain and wrote Secretary of War James A. Seddon that the company was ready for service.

"Several paragraphs having gone the rounds recently that the Seminoles remaining in Florida had recently committed murders and depredations on white families in South Florida, we take pleasure in stating, on the authority of an officer who had just returned from that region, that they are perfectly quiet, and have not been guilty of any outrages. They now number about eighty fine warriors, and their chief has called them all in to the interior from the coast for fear they will be tampered with by our enemies. They are desirous of entering the Confederate service, and will soon be organized into a company and armed. Our old friend, Col. H. V. Snell, who is a great favorite with them, will probably be most effectually and faithfully attended to. When they do find a Yankee intruder, or a Thayer colonist, he will receive his perpetual pre-emption to Florida soil. They are a remnant of a small tribe of brave Seminoles, against the armies of the United States, led by Scott, the best general in the service, during a period of over seven years, and were never completely subjugated. They will prove to be most valuable allies. They will protect a long line of the Florida coast, and will be a terror to Yankee invaders. They should henceforth be cherished and protected by the Confederacy, and a home in perpetuity should be laid off for them in South Florida."

— The Weekly Advertiser, The Florida Indians, November 5, 1862

=== Hodges' Company ===
At the opening of the Civil War, Andrew E. Hodges was living near Cedar Key, Florida. In 1862, he was part of a home guard that navigated the waterways and coasts. Later that year he raised a company of sharp shooters.

=== McBride's Company ===
McBride had mustered 65 individuals on July 7, 1864, at Everglades, Florida. On the muster roll the following was declared, "We, the undersigned, respectfully volunteer and tender our services to the Confederate States of America, begging to be immediately admitted into their armies, having chosen A. McBride for our Captain."

=== Organization ===
- Hodges' Company (organizational life: 1862-July 1864)
  - Company (Andrew E. Hodges)
- McBride's Company (organizational life: July 1864 – 1865)
  - Company (Captain Andrew M. McBride)
  - Total: 65 men

=== Battles ===
- Battle of Olustee

"The most desperate enemy that we have to contend with here is the Florida Indians, who have organized themselves into roving bands of bushwhackers and occasionally steal upon our picket lines under cover of night and disturb our sentinels. Many of the Redskins are sharp-shooters. During the recent battle, they betook themselves to the tree-tops and picked off many of the officers of the Colored Troops."

— Frederick F. French, Letter to Thomas F. Kelly of Glens Falls, New York, March 6, 1864

== Aftermath ==
=== Trans-Mississippi Theater ===
Reconstruction was a particularly harsh for the Indian nations found west of the Mississippi.

=== Western Theater ===
After the War ended, the Seminole Indians became reclusive, and their history was obscured. Florida's Seminole Indians continue to live in and around the Everglades.

Both Andrew E. Hodges and Andrew McBride survived the War. They lived out the remainder of their lives in Florida.

== See also ==
- Florida in the American Civil War
