= Indian Home Guard =

US Civil War Union Army Native American infantry

The Indian Home Guard was a series of volunteer infantry regiments recruited from the Five Civilized Tribes of the Indian Territory to support the Union during the American Civil War. There was also a series of Confederate units of Indian Territory.

The leaders of all of the Five Civilized Tribes signed treaties with the Confederacy at the start of the Civil War. Many of the tribal members, however, did not support the Confederacy, and, not being organized, were driven from Indian Territory with a large loss of life. Most fled to Kansas and Missouri. Many of the "Loyal" Indians volunteered for Union duty in order to get control back from the Confederate generals. The Indian Home Guard regiments fought mostly in Indian Territory and Arkansas. It was mainly due to these Loyal Indians that the Five Civilized Tribes were able to retain any of their lands following the end of the Civil War.

== Indian Home Guard Regiments ==
=== 1st Regiment, Indian Home Guard ===
Organized at Le Roy, Kansas on May 22, 1862, it included Major William Addison Phillips. The regiment consisted of eight companies of Creeks and two recruited amongst the Seminole. Company A of the unit was led by Sonuk Mikko. From the summer 1862 to Spring 1865, the 1st Indian Home Guard participated in over thirty actions.

=== 2nd Regiment, Indian Home Guard ===
Organized on Big Creek and at Five-Mile Creek, Kansas, June 22 to July 18, 1862. "Concurrently with the 1st Regiment of Indian Home Guards in May 1862, this regiment, commanded by Colonel John Ritchie, consisted of one company each of Delaware, Kickapoo, Quapaw, Seneca, and Shawnee, two companies of Osage, and two of Cherokee. It took longer to organize, due to the political disagreements of the various government agents involved in the negotiations. They were attached to the first Indian Expedition given the task of clearing the territory north of the Arkansas River of Confederates. Lack of support from higher command, as well as in-fighting" among the colonels, caused the expedition to be withdrawn."

=== 3rd Regiment, Indian Home Guard ===
The Third Regiment was formed at Tahlequah and Park Hill in July 1862. It was commanded by Colonel William A. Phillips, promoted from Major in the 1st Regiment. Many of its troops had previously fought for the Confederate Army, particularly the First Cherokee Mounted Rifles that had been commanded by Colonel John Drew.

=== 4th Regiment, Indian Home Guard ===
Organization commenced but not completed. Men transferred to other organizations.

== See also ==
- Indian Territory in the American Civil War
- Indian cavalry
- Indian Scouts
- Choctaw in the American Civil War
- Cherokee in the American Civil War
