= Stand Watie =

Cherokee politician and general (1806-1871)

- ᏕᎦᏙᎦ
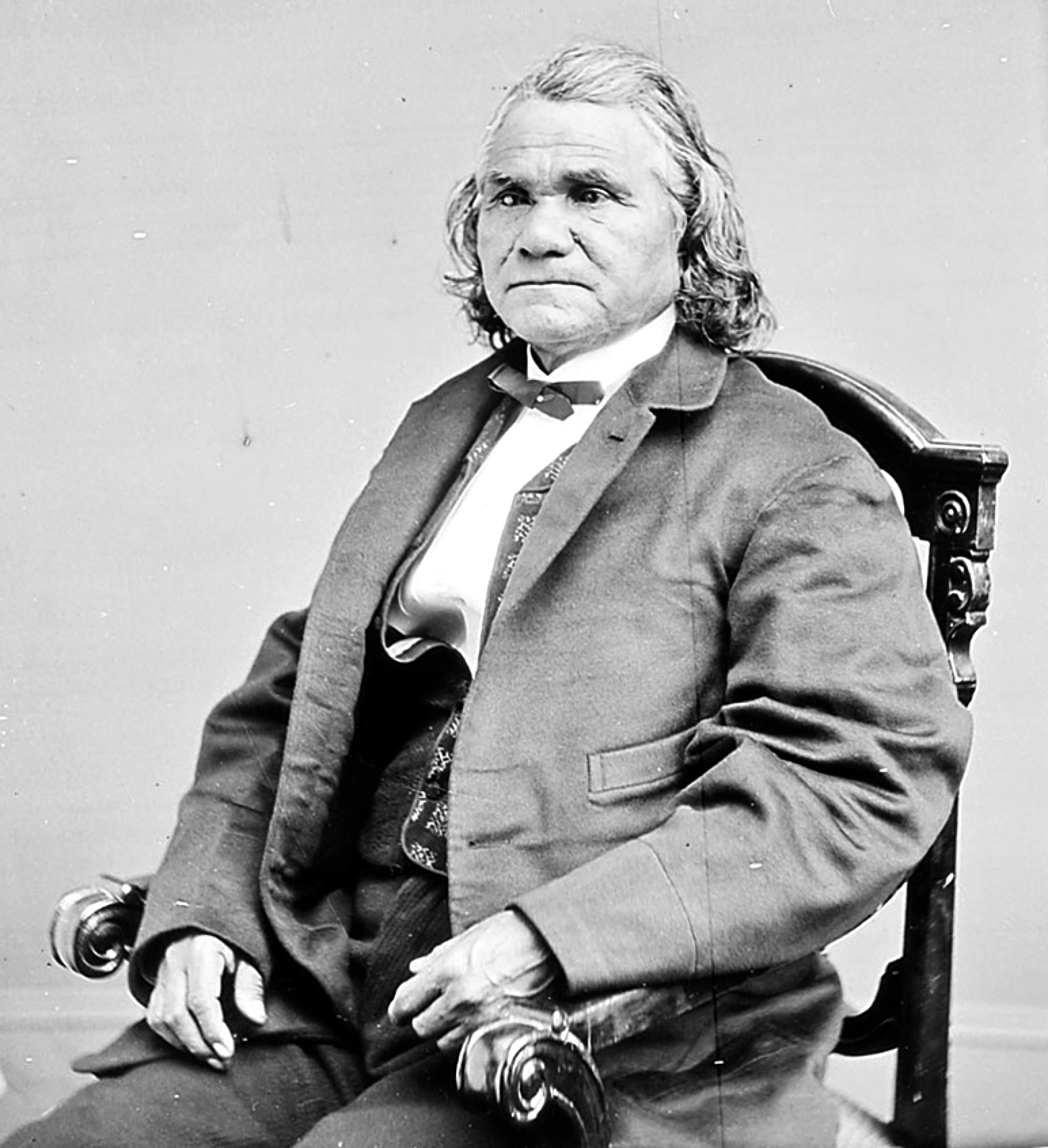
- Watie, c. 1865

Principal Chief of the Cherokee Nation (Confederate-aligned faction) (Note: Watie was elected chief by pro-Confederate Cherokees and recognized by the Confederate States of America during the American Civil War, while John Ross remained the chief recognized by pro-Union Cherokees and the United States federal government.)
- In office 1862–1866
- Preceded by: John Ross
- Succeeded by: Lewis Downing

Personal details
- Born: December 12, 1806 Oothcaloga, Cherokee Nation, U.S.
- Died: September 9, 1871 (aged 64) Delaware District, Cherokee Nation, U.S.
- Resting place: Polson Cemetery, Delaware County, Oklahoma, U.S. 36°31′32.2″N 94°38′09.5″W
- Relatives: Elias Boudinot (brother); E. C. Boudinot (nephew)
- Nickname: Degata (Note: In Cherokee, this translates to "Stands on Two Feet".)

Military service
- Allegiance: Confederate States
- Branch: Confederate States Army
- Years of service: 1861–1865
- Rank: Brigadier-General
- Commands: 2d Cherokee Mounted Rifles (1861–62); 1st Cherokee Mounted Rifles (1862–64); 1st Indian Brigade (1864–65)
- Battles: American Civil War; Battle of Wilson's Creek; Battle of Chustenahlah; Battle of Pea Ridge; First Battle of Cabin Creek; Second Battle of Cabin Creek; Ambush of the J. R. Williams; Battle of Fort Smith

Brigadier-General Stand Watie (Cherokee: ᏕᎦᏙᎦ, romanized: Degadaga, or Degadoga, lit. 'Stands on Two Feet'; December 12, 1806 – September 9, 1871), also known as Standhope Uwatie and Isaac S. Watie, was a Cherokee politician who served as the second principal chief of the Cherokee Nation from 1862 to 1866. The Cherokee Nation allied with the Confederate States during the American Civil War, and he was subsequently the only Native American Confederate general officer. Watie commanded Indian forces in the Trans-Mississippi Theater, made up mostly of Cherokee, Muskogee, and Seminole. He was the last Confederate States Army general to surrender.

Before removal of the Cherokee to Indian Territory in the late 1830s, Watie and his older brother Elias Boudinot were among Cherokee leaders who signed the Treaty of New Echota in 1835. The majority of the tribe opposed their action. In 1839, the brothers were attacked in an assassination attempt, as were other relatives active in the Treaty Party. All but Stand Watie were killed. Watie in 1842 killed one of his uncle's attackers, and in 1845 his brother Thomas was killed in retaliation, in a continuing cycle of violence that reached Indian Territory. Watie was acquitted by the Cherokee at trial in the 1850s on the grounds of self-defense.

Watie led the Southern Cherokee delegation to Washington, D.C., after the American Civil War to sue for peace, hoping to have tribal divisions recognized. The federal government negotiated only with the leaders who had sided with the Union. Watie stayed out of politics for his last years, and tried to rebuild his plantation.

== Early life ==
Stand Watie was born on December 12, 1806, at Oothcaloga, Cherokee Nation (present-day Calhoun, Georgia), the son of Uwatie (Cherokee for "the ancient one", sometimes spelled Oowatie), a full-blood Cherokee, and Susanna Reese, daughter of a white father and Cherokee mother. He was named Degataga. According to one biography, this name means "standing firm" when translated to English. Watie's brothers were Gallagina, nicknamed "Buck" (who later took the name Elias Boudinot), and Thomas Watie. They were close to their paternal uncle Major Ridge, and his son John Ridge, both later leaders in the tribe. By 1827, their father David Uwatie had become a wealthy planter, who held African-American slaves as laborers.

After Uwatie converted to Christianity with the Moravians, he took the name of David Uwatie; he and Susanna renamed Degataga as Isaac. Degataga preferred to use "Stand", a loose translation of his Cherokee name. Later, the family dropped the "U" from the spelling of their surname, using "Watie." Along with his two brothers and sisters, Watie learned to read and write English at the Moravian mission school in Spring Place, Cherokee Nation (now Georgia).

Stand Watie occasionally helped write articles for the Cherokee Phoenix newspaper, for which his older brother Elias served as editor from 1828 to 1832. The first Native American newspaper, the Phoenix published articles in both Cherokee and English.

Watie became involved in the dispute over Georgia's repressive anti-Indian laws. After gold was discovered on Cherokee lands in northern Georgia, thousands of white settlers encroached on Indian lands. There was continuing conflict, and Congress passed the 1830 Indian Removal Act, to relocate all Indians from the Southeast to lands west of the Mississippi River. In 1832, Georgia confiscated most of the Cherokee land, despite federal laws to protect Native Americans from state actions. The state sent militia to destroy the offices and press of the Cherokee Phoenix, which had published articles against Indian Removal.

Believing that removal was inevitable, the Watie brothers favored securing Cherokee rights by treaty before relocating to Indian Territory. They were among the Treaty Party leaders who signed the 1835 Treaty of New Echota.

== Indian Territory ==
In 1835, Watie, his family, and many other Cherokee immigrated to Indian Territory (present-day Oklahoma). They joined some Cherokee who had relocated as early as the 1820s and were known as the "Old Settlers". Those Cherokee who remained on tribal lands in the East were rounded up and forcibly removed by the U.S. government in 1838. Their journey became known as the "Trail of Tears," as 4,000 people died.

After removal, members of the Cherokee government carried out sentences against Treaty Party men for execution; their giving up tribal lands was a "blood" or capital offense under Cherokee law. Stand Watie, his brother Elias Boudinot, their uncle Major Ridge and cousin John Ridge, along with several other Treaty Party men, were all sentenced to death on June 22, 1839; only Stand Watie survived. He arranged for his brother Elias's children to be sent for their safety and education to their mother's family in Connecticut; their mother Harriet had died in 1836 before the migration.

In 1842, Watie encountered James Foreman, whom he recognized as one of his uncle's executioners, and killed him. This was part of the post-Removal violence within the tribe, which was close to civil war for years. Ross supporters executed Stand's brother Thomas Watie in 1845. In the 1850s, Stand Watie was tried in Arkansas for the murder of Foreman; he was acquitted on the grounds of self-defense. His nephew E. C. Boudinot, who had returned to the West and become a lawyer, defended him.

== American Civil War ==
In 1861, Principal Chief John Ross signed an alliance with the Confederate States to avoid disunity in Indian Territory. Within less than a year, Ross and part of the National Council concluded that the agreement had proved disastrous. In the summer of 1862, Ross removed the tribal records to Union-held Kansas and then proceeded to Washington, D.C., to meet with President Lincoln. After Ross fled to Federal-controlled territory, Watie replaced him as principal chief. After Ross's departure, Tom Pegg took over as principal chief of the pro-Union Cherokee. Following Lincoln's Emancipation Proclamation in January 1863, Pegg called a special session of the Cherokee National Council. On February 18, 1863, it passed a resolution to emancipate all slaves within the boundaries of the Cherokee Nation.

After many Cherokee fled north to Kansas or south to Texas for safety, pro-Confederates took advantage of the instability and elected Stand Watie principal chief. Ross's supporters refused to recognize the validity of the election. Open warfare broke out between Confederate and Union Cherokee within Indian Territory, the damage heightened by brigands with no allegiance at all. After the Civil War ended, both factions sent delegations to Washington. Watie pushed for recognition of a separate "Southern Cherokee Nation", but never achieved that.

National Color of the 1st Cherokee Mounted Rifles

Watie was the only Native American to rise to a Confederate brigadier-general's rank during the war. Fearful of the Federal Government and the threat to create a State (Oklahoma) out of most of what was then the semi-sovereign "Indian Territory", a majority of the Cherokee Nation initially voted to support the Confederacy in the American Civil War for pragmatic reasons. Watie organized a regiment of mounted infantry. In October 1861, he was commissioned as colonel in what would become the 1st Cherokee Mounted Rifles.

Although Watie fought Federal troops, he also led his men in fighting between factions of the Cherokee and in attacks on Cherokee civilians and farms, as well as against the Creek, Seminole and others in Indian Territory who chose to support the Union. Watie is noted for his role in the Battle of Pea Ridge, Arkansas, on March 6–8, 1862. Under the overall command of General Benjamin McCulloch, Watie's troops captured Union artillery positions and covered the retreat of Confederate forces from the battlefield after the Union took control. However, most of the Cherokees who had joined Colonel John Drew's regiment defected to the Union side. Drew, a nephew of Chief Ross, remained loyal to the Confederacy.

In August 1862, after John Ross and his followers announced their support for the Union and went to Fort Leavenworth, the remaining Southern Confederate minority faction elected Stand Watie as principal chief. After Cherokee support for the Confederacy sharply declined, Watie continued to lead the remnant of his cavalry. He was appointed to the grade of Brigadier-General on May 10, 1864, with a date of rank of May 6, though he did not receive word of his promotion until after he led the ambush of the steamboat J. R. Williams on July 16, 1864. Watie commanded the First Indian Brigade of the Army of the Trans-Mississippi, composed of two regiments of Mounted Rifles and three battalions of Cherokee, Seminole and Osage infantry.

They fought in a number of battles and skirmishes in the western Confederate states, including the Indian Territory, Arkansas, Missouri, Kansas, and Texas. Watie's force reportedly fought in more battles west of the Mississippi River than any other unit. Watie took part in what is considered to be the greatest (and most famous) Confederate victory in Indian Territory, the Second Battle of Cabin Creek, which took place in what is now Mayes County, Oklahoma, on September 19, 1864. He and General Richard Montgomery Gano led a raid that captured a Federal wagon train and netted approximately $1 million worth of wagons, mules, commissary supplies, and other needed items. Stand Watie's forces massacred black haycutters at Wagoner, Oklahoma during this raid. Union reports said that Watie's Indian cavalry "killed all the Negroes they could find", including wounded men.

Since most Cherokee were now Union supporters, during the war, General Watie's family and other Confederate Cherokee took refuge in Rusk and Smith counties of east Texas.

The Confederate Army put Watie in command of the Indian Division of Indian Territory in February 1865. By then, however, the Confederates were no longer able to fight in the territory effectively. On June 23, 1865, at Doaksville in the Choctaw Nation (now Oklahoma), Watie signed a cease-fire agreement with Union representatives for his command, the First Indian Brigade of the Army of the Trans-Mississippi. He was the last Confederate general in the field to surrender.

In September 1865, after his demobilization, Watie went to Texas to see his wife Sallie and to mourn the death of their son, Comisky, who had died at age 15. After the war, Watie was a member of the Cherokee Delegation to the Southern Treaty Commission, which renegotiated treaties with the United States.

== Later life ==
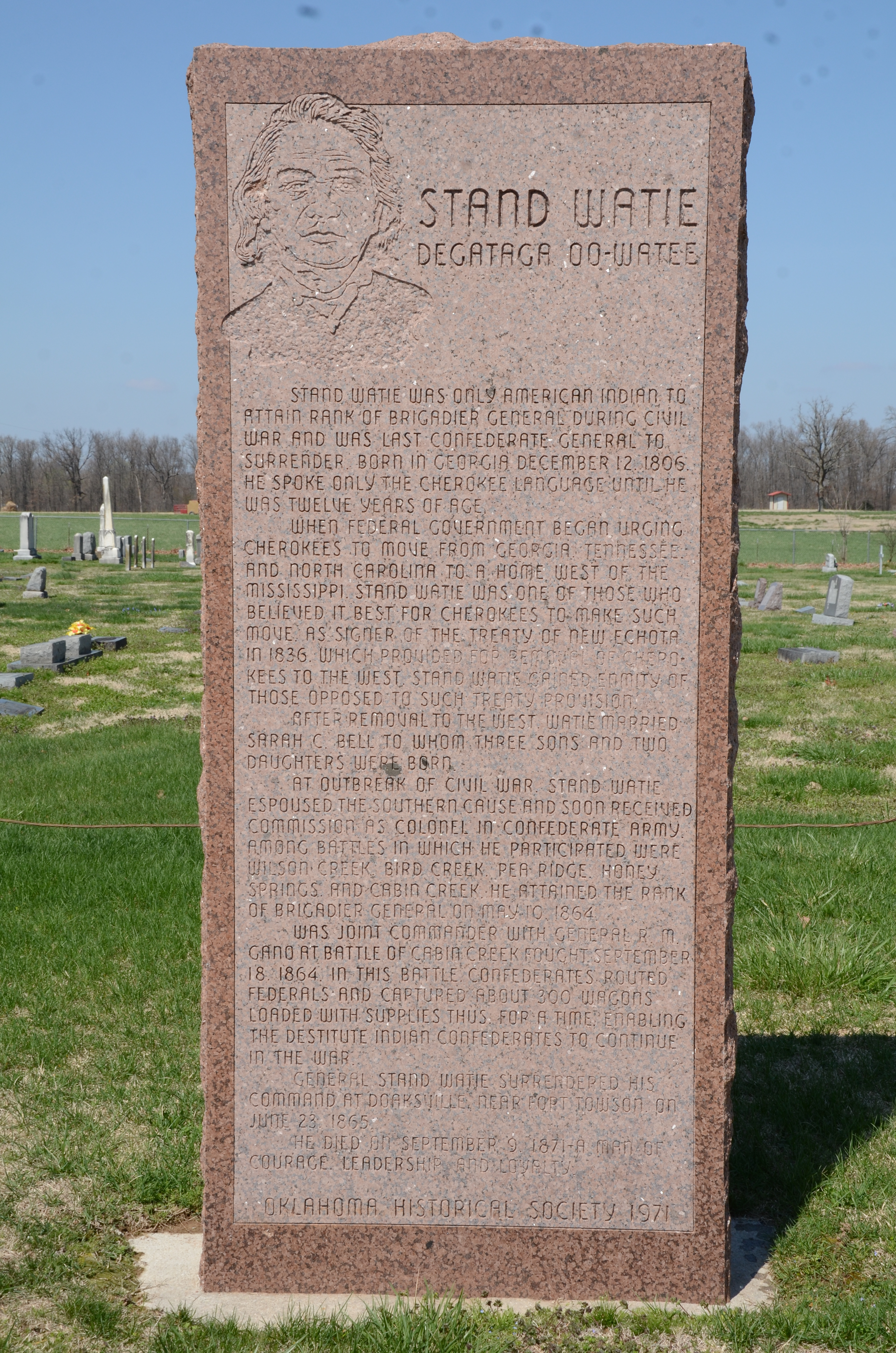
Historical marker

The U.S. government, recognizing that the two factions would never agree on common terms, decided to negotiate with them separately and play them against each other. By doing so, it was able to extract a number of concessions from both sides. The resulting treaty required the Cherokee to free their slaves. The Southern Cherokee wanted the government to pay to relocate the Cherokee Freedmen from their lands. The Northern Cherokee suggested adopting them into the tribe, but wanted the federal government to give the Freedman an exclusive piece of associated territory. The federal government required that the Cherokee Freedmen would receive full rights for citizenship, land, and annuities as the Cherokee. It assigned them land in the Canadian addition. This treaty was signed by Ross on July 19, 1866, and ratified by the U.S. Senate on July 27, four days before Ross's death.

The tribe was strongly divided over the treaty issues and a new chief was elected, Lewis Downing, a full-blood and compromise candidate. He was a shrewd and politically savvy Principal Chief, bringing about reconciliation and reunification among the Cherokee.

After the treaty signing, Watie had gone into exile in the Choctaw Nation. Shortly after Downing's election, he returned to the Cherokee. Watie tried to stay out of politics and rebuild his fortunes. He returned to Honey Creek, where he died on September 9, 1871. Watie was buried in the old Ridge Cemetery, later called Polson's Cemetery, in what is now Delaware County, Oklahoma, as a citizen of the Cherokee Nation.

== Personal life ==
After moving to Indian Territory, Stand Watie married Sarah Bell on September 18, 1842. Their families had been long-time friends. They had three sons: Saladin, Solon and Cumiska, and two daughters, Minnee and Jacqueline. Saladin died in 1868, while Solon died during the following year. Both daughters died not long after their father. Sarah died in 1884. One source states that Stand Watie married four women: Eleanor Looney, Elizabeth Fields, Isabella Hicks, and Sarah Caroline Bell. His child with Elizabeth Fields was stillborn in 1836.

== In popular culture ==
- Stand Watie is featured occasionally in Rifles for Watie, a 1957 novel by Harold Keith. It portrays the experiences of a young Union soldier from Kansas, who meets Watie and his people in Tahlequah.
- He was featured as a character in the film The Great Sioux Uprising (1953), played by Glenn Strange.
- The song "Coyotes," recorded by Don Edwards, is a longtime cowboy's lament about losses from the Old West: Comanches, outlaws, longhorns, Geronimo, the red wolf, and Stand Watie.
- In The Outlaw Josey Wales, chiefly set after the Civil War and based on the books The Rebel Outlaw: Josey Wales and its sequel The Vengeance Trail of Josey Wales, the character of Lone Watie (played by Chief Dan George) is described as a cousin of Stand Watie.
- On June 13, 2020, following the George Floyd protests, a 1921 monument to Stand Watie and a 1913 monument to Confederate soldiers were removed from the Cherokee Capitol grounds in Tahlequah. Chief Chuck Hoskin Jr. insisted the reason was because it was the Daughters of the Confederacy, and not the Cherokee Nation, who had commissioned and erected the monuments. The monuments were placed in storage by the Cherokee Nation.
- A 2007 Carolina Times article commenting on U.S. Representative Keith Ellison's decision to swear the oath of office on a copy of the Quran has been erroneously cited in online Arab and Islamic news sources as confirming the existence of a "Ramadan Ibn Wati", a Muslim Cherokee chief who appears contemporary with Stand Watie, and father to a "Saladin Watie". The Carolina Times article directly correlates Stand Watie to this mythical "Ramadan Ibn Wati" figure.
- In July 2026 Stand Watie co-stars L’ultimo guerriero, a special issue of the comics series of which is the protagonist Tex Willer; in his old age the general tries to tries to convince one of his former fighters to lay down his arms and surrender.

== See also ==
- List of Confederate States Army generals

== Works cited ==
- Cunningham, Frank (1959). General Stand Watie's Confederate Indians. Foreword by Brad Agnew. San Antonio: The Naylor Company. OCLC 1084726151 – via HathiTrust. eprinted: ISBN 978-0-8061-3035-4
- Knight, Wilfred (1988). Red Fox: Stand Watie's Civil War Years. Glendale, California: Arthur H. Clark Co. ISBN 978-0-87062-179-6.
- Langguth, A. J. (2010). Driven West: Andrew Jackson and the Trail of Tears to the Civil War (Print). New York: Simon & Schuster. ISBN 978-1-4165-4859-1.
- Moulton, Gary E (1978). John Ross: Cherokee Chief. Athens, Georgia: University of Georgia Press. ISBN 978-0820323671.

Military offices
| Preceded by Colonel John Drew | Commanding officer of the 1st Cherokee Mounted Rifles; 1862–1864 | Succeeded by Colonel Robert C. Parks |
| Preceded by John Ross | Principal Chief of the Cherokee Nation; 1862–1866 | Succeeded by John Ross |
