= 6th Texas Cavalry Regiment =

Confederate mounted volunteers, American Civil War

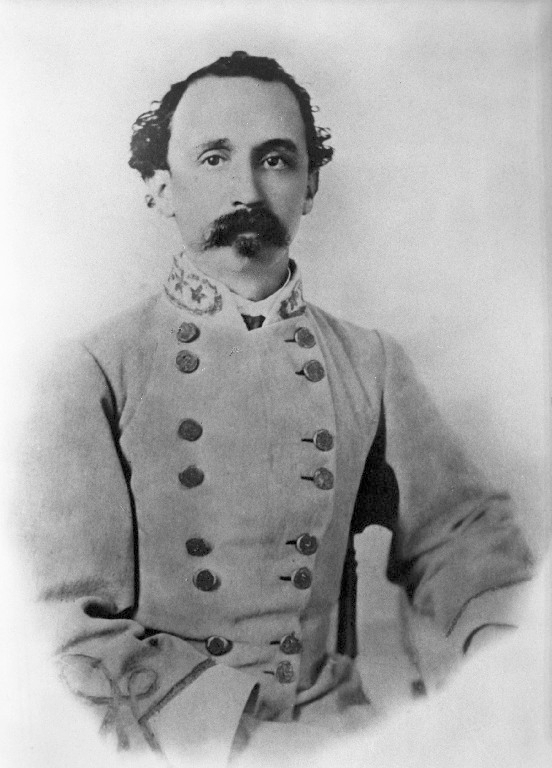
- L. Sullivan "Sul" Ross was a popular colonel.
- Active: 6 September 1861 – 4 May 1865
- Country: Confederate States of America
- Allegiance: Confederate States of America, Texas
- Branch: Confederate States Army
- Type: Cavalry and Infantry
- Size: Regiment
- Engagements: American Civil War; Battle of Chustenahlah (1861); Battle of Pea Ridge (1862); Siege of Corinth (1862); Battle of Corinth (1862); Battle of Hatchie's Bridge (1862); Holly Springs Raid (1862); Battle of Thompson's Station (1863); Atlanta campaign (1864); Franklin–Nashville Campaign (1864)

Commanders
- Notable commanders: Col. Lawrence Sullivan Ross

The 6th Texas Cavalry Regiment was a unit of mounted volunteers that fought in the Confederate States Army during the American Civil War. The regiment fought at Chustenahlah in 1861. The following year the unit fought at Pea Ridge, First Corinth, Second Corinth, Hatchie's Bridge, and Holly Springs. The 6th Texas Cavalry participated in the fighting at Thompson's Station in 1863, the Atlanta campaign, and the Franklin–Nashville Campaign in 1864. The regiment formally surrendered to Union forces in May 1865 and its remaining soldiers were paroled.

== Formation ==
The 6th Texas Cavalry mustered into the Confederate Army at Camp Bartow near Dallas on 6 September 1861. The regiment counted 1,150 officers and men formed into 10 companies. The soldiers enlisted for one year, but the Confederate Conscription Act of 1862 extended this term of service. The field officers were Colonel Barton Warren Stone Jr., Lieutenant Colonel John Summerfield Griffith, and Major Lawrence Sullivan "Sul" Ross. The companies were organized as follows. In November 1861, the Ladies' Aid Society of Lancaster, Texas provided $1,676.50 worth of clothing, footwear, and blankets for soldiers of the regiment.

Recruitment Areas of the 6th Texas Cavalry Regiment
Company	Captain	Recruitment Area
A	A. J. Hardin	Kaufman County
B	John Summerfield Griffith	Kaufman County
C	Fayette Smith	Dallas County
D	Thomas H. Bowen	Collin County
E	Jack Wharton	Van Zandt County
F	Robert S. Guy	Dallas County
G	Peter F. Ross	McLennan County
H	Robert M. White	Bell County
I	Henry W. Bridges	Henderson County
K	James W. Throckmorton	Collin County

== History ==
=== Chustenahlah and Pea Ridge ===
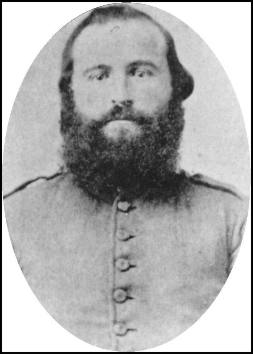
James M. McIntosh

The 6th Texas Cavalry received orders to march to Fort Smith, Arkansas in November 1861. The regiment marched in three echelons; the first was led by Ross, the second by Griffith, and the third by Stone. On 26 December 1861, the Texans took part in the Battle of Chustenahlah. The majority of the tribes in Indian Territory joined the Confederacy, but some Native Americans remained loyal to the Union. The pro-Union Indians and their leader Opothleyahola fled toward Kansas with their families, possessions, and livestock, with the 9th Texas Cavalry Regiment and pro-Confederate Indians under Colonel Douglas H. Cooper in pursuit. Cooper's force failed to stop Opothleyahola's band after skirmishes at Round Mountain on 19 November 1861 and Chusto-Talasah (Bird Creek) on 9 December. Cooper asked for help and Brigadier General James M. McIntosh led 1,380 Texas horsemen to attack the pro-Union Indians at Chustenahlah. At noon, McIntosh dismounted his cavalrymen and sent them to assault a ridge defended by Opothleyahola's warriors. By 5:00 pm the Texans captured 160 women and children and drove off the remaining pro-Union Indians. Later, pro-Confederate Indians arrived and continued the pursuit; allegedly as many as 700 people were killed or died of exposure. McIntosh's Texans did not participate in the pursuit and marched back to Fort Smith. The 6th Texas Cavalry lost 13 killed and 30 wounded in the battle.

The 6th Texas Cavalry joined a Confederate force under Brigadier General Benjamin McCulloch, who ordered Ross to take his cavalrymen on a raid behind the Union forces occupying the extreme northwest corner of Arkansas. Ross led his horsemen well to the west of Samuel Ryan Curtis's Federal army and struck the Union supply line at Keetsville, Missouri. On 25 February 1862, the Texans overpowered the Federal outpost, killing two and capturing one while losing two men wounded and one or two missing. Ross's men burned five sutlers' wagons and captured 60 horses and mules. The raiders' return route went east of Curtis's army and south across the Boston Mountains; they arrived in camp on 1 March.

At the Battle of Pea Ridge on 7–8 March 1862, the 6th Texas Cavalry was part of McIntosh's Brigade in McCulloch's Division. This was part of Major General Earl Van Dorn's Army of the West. As McIntosh's troopers advanced east along the Ford Road on the morning of 7 March, they were in five parallel columns of four, with the 6th Texas second from the right. Without warning, the formation came under fire from Federal guns near a wood's edge to their right rear. The three guns fired six shots each, killing at least ten cavalrymen and wounding others. Newton Keen of the 6th Texas watched as one projectile hit the ground near him and then ricocheted 20 ft (6 m) in the air. McIntosh ordered his horsemen to face to the right and charge. At the last moment McCulloch pulled the 3rd Texas Cavalry Regiment out of the formation to guard the guns of Good's Texas Battery. The 6th Texas participated in the grand charge that captured the guns and routed Colonel Cyrus Bussey's Federal horsemen. Ross was the only Confederate officer who attempted to pursue the routed Union cavalry through the forest. But as he and the 6th Texas Cavalry burst into the open they were confronted with a long line of Federal infantry and artillery from Colonel Peter J. Osterhaus's division. Under a salvo of hostile cannon fire, Ross ordered a retreat, admitting, "I did not run, but I walked very fast." Ross informed McCulloch of his finding.

McCulloch deployed his division with infantry in the first line and the cavalry in a second line. The 6th Texas Cavalry formed up near Good's Battery. McCulloch then rode into the woods and was killed by a Union skirmisher. Foolishly, McCulloch's staff officers kept the general's death a secret. Soon afterward, the second-in-command McIntosh was also killed. While these events occurred, the third-in-command Colonel Louis Hebert led half of his infantry brigade into the woods farther east. The breakdown of the division's chain of command was complete. As late as 3:00 pm one of McCulloch's staff officers spoke with Colonel Elkanah Greer but failed to report McCulloch's death, despite the fact that Greer was the division's fourth-in-command. By 4:00 pm Hebert's attack was defeated. Soon after, Greer finally found that Hebert was missing (captured) and that he was the division's ranking officer. By this time, McCulloch's division was disintegrating, with many units marching to join the other half of the army. However, the 6th Texas Cavalry and other units returned to camp, entirely missing the second day of the battle.

=== Corinth and Holly Springs ===
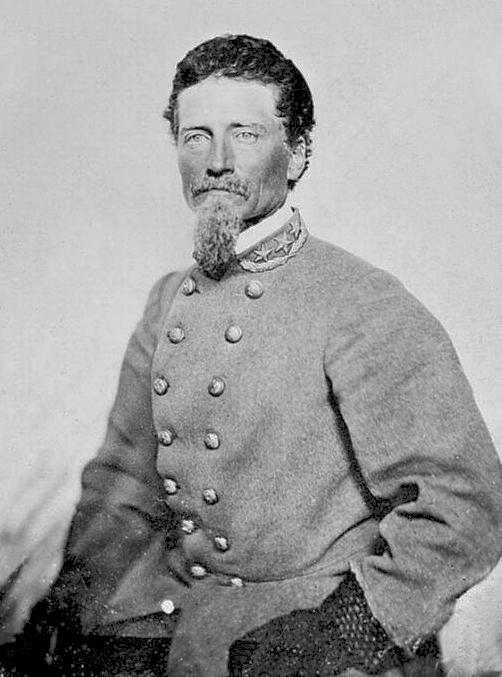
Dabney H. Maury

After Pea Ridge, the 6th Texas Cavalry numbered 935 officers and men. On 15 April 1862, the regiment was dismounted to fight as infantry and its horses were sent back to Texas. The unit was sent east to join General P. G. T. Beauregard's army. The 6th Texas suffered heavy losses from disease, with 41 men dying in Arkansas and 62 men dying in Mississippi. Corinth, Mississippi proved to be an unhealthy campsite because of its bad water supply and 18,000 of the 80,000 Confederate soldiers there were ill. After arriving at Corinth, the regiment numbered 803 effectives and was led by Stone. Ross wrote that Corinth was a "sickly, malarial spot fit only for alligators and snakes." On 14 May 1862, the regiment chose new officers and "Sul" Ross was elected as the new colonel. Stone went back to Texas to recruit a new regiment. At the end of May, Beauregard's army ended the Siege of Corinth by evacuating the place.

During the Second Battle of Corinth on 3–4 October 1862, the 6th Texas Cavalry (dismounted) was assigned to Brigadier General Charles W. Phifer's brigade, Brigadier General Dabney H. Maury's division, Major General Sterling Price's corps. The brigade's other units were the 3rd Arkansas Cavalry and 9th Texas Cavalry Regiments, 1st Arkansas Cavalry Battalion (Stirman's), all fighting as infantry, and McNally's Arkansas Battery under Lieutenant Frank A. Moore. During the fighting, the brigade lost 94 killed, 273 wounded, and 200 missing. At mid-morning on the first day, Phifer's brigade easily overran the breastworks manned by only five Union infantry companies. Later in the afternoon, the brigade's advance was slowed by five Federal cannons of Spoor's 2nd Iowa Battery. Phifer's brigade attacked a 250-man outfit called the "Union Brigade" which defended itself weakly and then fled. On the second day, Maury's division attacked a Federal strongpoint known as Battery Robinett, armed with three 20-pounder Parrott rifles and Colonel John W. Fuller's Union brigade. To the east of Battery Robinett, the 6th and 9th Texas Cavalry attacked the 27th Ohio and 39th Ohio Infantry. The first Union volley stopped the attack with heavy losses, but the Texans pulled back about 30 yd (27 m) and some took cover behind stumps and fallen trees. The Texans fired with deadly accuracy, shooting down almost one-fourth of the 39th Ohio's soldiers. The 6th Texas got within 8 yd (7 m) of the 27th Ohio. In the confusion, Colonel Ross was thrown from his horse but not hurt. The color bearer of the 6th Texas was shot down and Ohio Private Orrin Gould seized the flag, but was badly wounded by a bullet in his chest. Finally, the Texans retreated, some of them on their hands and knees to escape the blistering rifle fire. At Corinth, the 6th Texas reported losing 8 officers and 42 enlisted men killed, 7 officers and 52 men wounded, and 23 men missing, for a total of 132 casualties.

As the Confederate army retreated west from Corinth, its route led across the Hatchie River at Davis Bridge. This brought on the Battle of Hatchie's Bridge on 5 October 1862. Maury led John Creed Moore's brigade across the river in the early morning. A numerically superior Union division led by Edward Ord suddenly attacked at 9:00 am and overwhelmed Moore's troops, capturing a few hundred men. While Moore was being overrun, General Price foolishly waved the 6th and 9th Texas across the bridge. The Texans were soon caught up in the rout of Moore's hapless soldiers and lost 100 men as prisoners before they could retreat across the bridge. Now it was the Confederates' turn to punish their foes. Phifer's brigade, temporarily led by Ross, took up positions on a bluff overlooking the east bank of the Hatchie River. Stupidly, Ord commanded the Federals to cross to the east side of the bridge. Moore's and Ross's men were soon joined by William Lewis Cabell's brigade and they easily repulsed the Federal attack, inflicting more than 500 casualties. At Hatchie's Bridge, the 6th Texas lost 5 enlisted men killed, 4 wounded, and 7 missing, for a total of no officers and 16 enlisted men casualties.

Even before the October fighting at Corinth and Hatchie's Bridge, details were sent to Texas to bring the regiment's horses. The 6th Texas Cavalry was remounted and joined a cavalry brigade that included the 3rd Texas, 9th Texas, and 27th Texas Cavalry Regiments. John Wilkins Whitfield assumed command of the brigade on 23 October 1862. Lieutenant Colonel Griffith of the 6th Texas Cavalry first proposed a raid on Ulysses S. Grant's supply base at Holly Springs, Mississippi. General Van Dorn led 3,500 cavalrymen on the successful Holly Springs Raid on 20 December 1862. Surprising the defenders, Van Dorn's horsemen captured 1,500 Union soldiers and destroyed US$1,500,000 of supplies. This action forced Grant's army to withdraw to Grand Junction, Tennessee.

=== Later operations ===
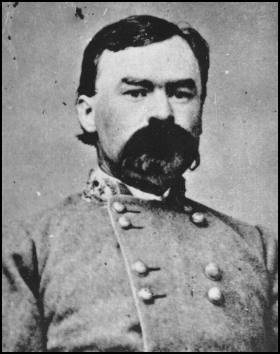
William H. Jackson

Whitfield's Texas cavalry brigade fought at the Battle of Thompson's Station on 5 March 1863. The day before, a Union infantry brigade under the command of John Coburn advanced south from Franklin, Tennessee on a reconnaissance. The Federals brushed aside elements of William Hicks Jackson's Confederate cavalry division, but continued to march forward even though Coburn feared a trap. The next morning Coburn's brigade approached Thompson's Station and drove the Confederates from two hills just to the north. At this time, the Union artillery and cavalry units left the field without warning. Van Dorn ordered Jackson's troopers to dismount and attack Coburn's troops from the south, while Nathan Bedford Forrest's division circled around and hit them from the north. Forrest's men seized Coburn's wagon train and blocked the Union escape route. Coburn finally surrendered when his soldiers ran out of ammunition. Confederate casualties numbered 357 while the Union troops lost 1,600, mostly captured. The fighting lasted for five hours.

The brigade transferred to Mississippi where it engaged in operations marginal to the Vicksburg campaign. W. H. Jackson's report of 4 June 1863 stated that Whitfield's cavalry brigade numbered 123 officers and 1,354 men present for duty in the 3rd, 6th, 9th, and 27th Texas. The 6th Texas was commanded by Colonel Ross. When Whitfield resigned on 29 October 1863 because of bad health, Ross was appointed the brigade commander. Since Ross and the 6th Texas Cavalry were on detached duty, Colonel Hinche P. Mabry of the 3rd Texas Cavalry took temporary command of the brigade. Ross assumed command of the brigade in mid-December 1863 and was soon promoted brigadier general. For the next several months, the brigade engaged in operations along the Yazoo River before being transferred to Georgia.

During the Atlanta campaign, the 6th Texas Cavalry was part of Ross's brigade in W. H. Jackson's cavalry division. As before, the brigade also included the 3rd, 9th, and 27th Texas Cavalry. (The 27th was also known as the 1st Texas Legion.) The 6th Texas was commanded by Lieutenant Colonel Peter F. Ross, the older brother of "Sul" Ross. During the campaign, the regiment fought in 86 actions within 112 days. Next, the regiment took part in John Bell Hood's Franklin–Nashville Campaign. Forrest commanded the Confederate cavalry, including W. H. Jackson's division. After the Confederate defeat at the Battle of Nashville in December 1864, Ross's brigade and another cavalry brigade covered the retreat. At this time, there was "dissension" in the brigade and many soldiers deserted. On 13 March 1865, Ross went back to Texas to recruit more soldiers and Colonel Dudley W. Jones of the 9th Texas took temporary command of the brigade. Consequently, Ross was not present when the 6th Texas Cavalry surrendered on 4 May 1865 at Jackson, Mississippi and was paroled. At the time of the surrender, Colonel Jack Wharton commanded the 6th Texas Cavalry and only 160 men remained in the entire brigade. The steamer E. H. Fairchild took the parolees to Natchitoches, Louisiana where they disembarked and made their way home to Texas. The survivors established the Ross Brigade Association in 1875.

== See also ==
- List of Texas Civil War Confederate units
