= 1st Arkansas Cavalry Regiment =

1st Arkansas Cavalry Regiment may refer to:

- 1st Arkansas Cavalry Regiment (Confederate)
- 1st Arkansas Cavalry Regiment (Union)
- 1st Arkansas Mounted Rifles, a Confederate unit
- 1st Cavalry Regiment, Arkansas State Troops, a Confederate unit

== See also ==
- 1st Arkansas Cavalry Battalion, a Confederate unit
- 1st Battalion, Arkansas State Troops, a Confederate cavalry unit
- 6th Arkansas Cavalry Regiment, sometimes known as the 1st Trans-Mississippi Cavalry Regiment
- 1st Arkansas Infantry Regiment (disambiguation)
