= 1st Arkansas Infantry Regiment =

1st Arkansas Infantry Regiment may refer to:

- 1st Arkansas Infantry Regiment (Union)
- 1st Arkansas Infantry Regiment (Confederate)
- 1st Arkansas 30 Day Volunteer Regiment, a Confederate unit
- 1st Regiment, Arkansas State Troops, eventually the 15th Arkansas Infantry Regiment
- 1st Arkansas Colored Infantry Regiment, eventually the 46th United States Colored Infantry Regiment
- 1st Arkansas Consolidated Infantry Regiment, a Confederate regiment in the Trans-Mississippi theater
- 1st Arkansas Consolidated Infantry Regiment, a Confederate regiment formed in 1865

== See also ==
- 1st Arkansas Infantry Battalion, a Union unit
- 1st Battalion, Arkansas State Troops, a Confederate unit
- 1st Arkansas Cavalry Regiment (disambiguation)
- 1st Arkansas Light Artillery
- 1st Arkansas Field Battery
