= 9th Texas Cavalry Regiment =

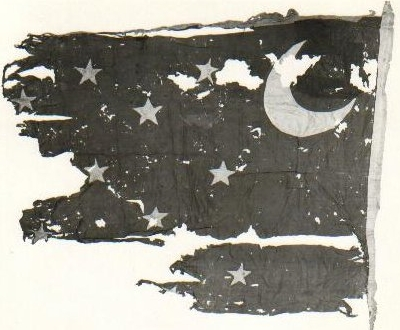
- Battle flag of the 9th Texas Cavalry
- Active: 2 October 1861 – 4 May 1865
- Country: Confederate States of America
- Allegiance: Confederate States of America, Texas
- Branch: Confederate States Army
- Type: Cavalry
- Size: Regiment
- Nickname: Sims's Regiment
- Engagements: American Civil War; Battle of Round Mountain (1861); Battle of Chusto-Talasah (1861); Battle of Pea Ridge (1862); Siege of Corinth (1862); Battle of Corinth (1862); Battle of Hatchie's Bridge (1862); Holly Springs Raid (1862); Battle of Thompson's Station (1863); Atlanta campaign (1864); Battle of Franklin (1864); Third Battle of Murfreesboro (1864)

Commanders
- Notable commanders: Col. William B. Sims

The 9th Texas Cavalry Regiment was a unit of mounted volunteers that fought in the Confederate States Army during the American Civil War. The regiment fought at Round Mountain and Bird Creek (Chusto-Talasah) in 1861, Pea Ridge, Siege of Corinth, Second Corinth, Hatchie's Bridge and the Holly Springs Raid in 1862, and in the Atlanta campaign, Franklin, and Murfreesboro in 1864. The unit fought dismounted at Second Corinth and Hatchie's Bridge before being remounted as cavalry for the remainder of the war. The regiment surrendered to Federal forces on 4 May 1865 and its remaining personnel were paroled.

== History ==
=== Formation ===
The 9th Texas Cavalry was mustered into service on 2 October 1861 at Brogden's Springs near Pottsboro in Grayson County, Texas. The field officers were Colonel William B. Sims, Lieutenant Colonel Nathan W. Townes, and Major William Quayle. A number of Texas counties were represented as follows: In 1861, as many as 1,050 men enrolled in the regiment.

Recruitment Areas of the 9th Texas Cavalry Regiment
Company	Recruitment Area
A	Tarrant County
B	Fannin County
C	Grayson County
D	Tarrant County
E	Red River County
F	Titus County
G	Hopkins County
H	Not stated
I	Titus County
K	Hopkins County

=== Indian Territory ===
The regiment first saw action in Indian Territory at the Battle of Round Mountain on 19 November 1861 and at the Battle of Chusto-Talasah on 9 December. Most of the tribes in Indian Territory supported the Confederacy, but several thousand native Americans remained loyal to the Union. The pro-Union Indians with their leader Opothleyahola fled toward Kansas with their families, possessions, and livestock. They were pursued by Douglas H. Cooper and over 1,400 horsemen including the 9th Texas Cavalry Regiment and pro-Confederate Indians. At Round Mountain, the Texans galloped ahead, hoping to defeat Opothleyahola's band on their own. Instead, they rode straight into an ambush in the dusk and were repulsed. The 20 missing men were found the next day with their skulls bashed in. Reinforced to a strength of 2,000, Cooper continued his pursuit of the pro-Union Indians. At Chusto-Talasah (Bird Creek) there was another clash where Cooper lost 15 killed and 37 wounded. Discouraged, Cooper ordered his column to return to Fort Gibson and a Confederate cavalry brigade under James M. McIntosh took up the pursuit. (Note: Monaghan named the 4th Texas, an early name for the 9th Texas.) After the 9th Texas Cavalry moved to Arkansas in February 1862, two companies went on Lawrence Sullivan (Sul) Ross's raid into Missouri.

=== Pea Ridge ===
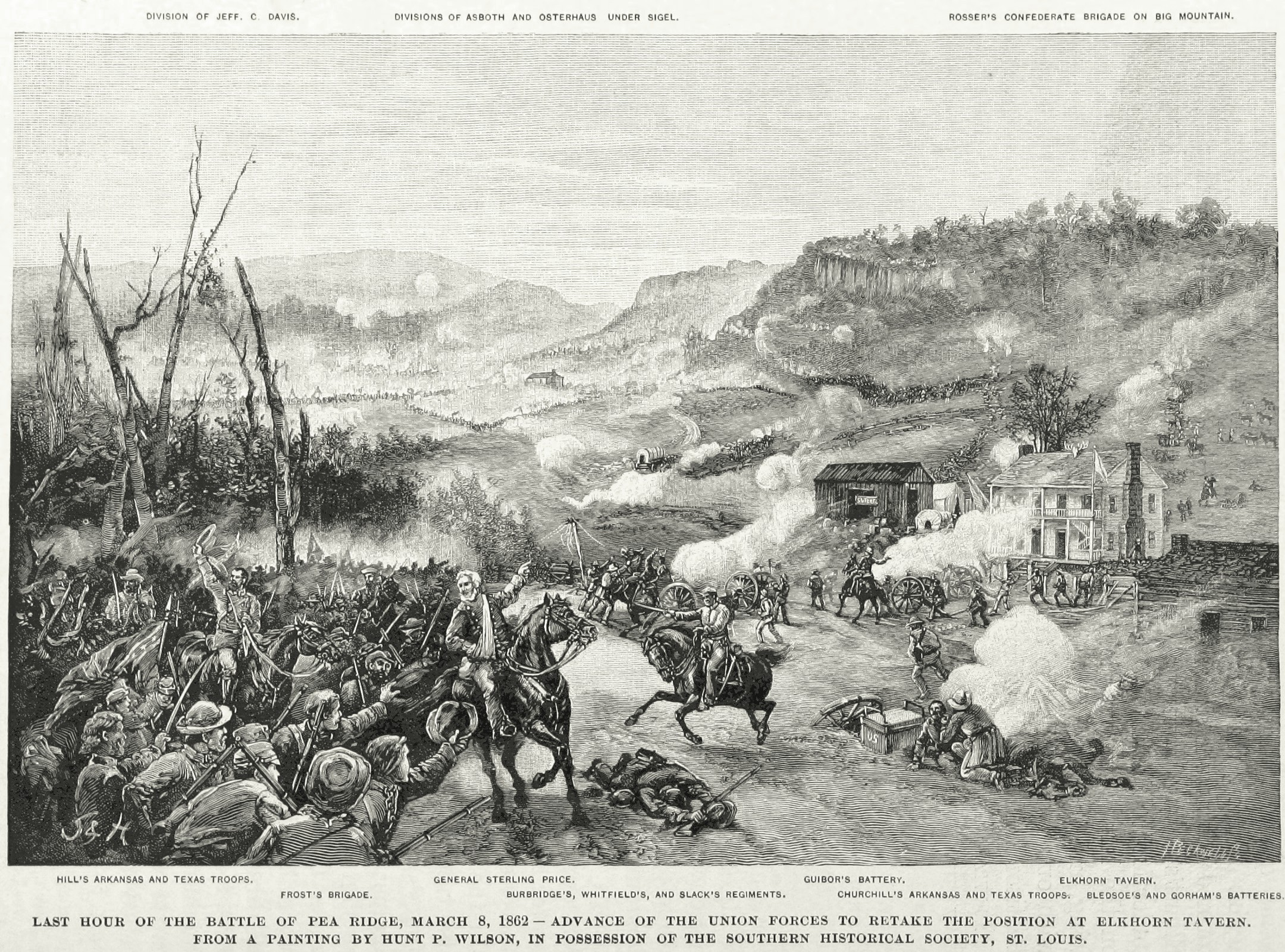
Sterling Price rallies his men on the second day of the Battle of Pea Ridge.

In early 1862, the regiment formed part of James M. McIntosh's 3,000-man cavalry brigade, together with the 3rd Texas, 6th Texas, and 11th Texas Cavalry Regiments, and the 1st Texas Cavalry and 1st Arkansas Cavalry Battalions. The brigade was part of Benjamin McCulloch's division which was soon incorporated into a Confederate army led by Earl Van Dorn. At the Battle of Pea Ridge on 6 March 1862, the cavalry brigade advanced east on the Ford Road toward an intended junction with a second Confederate division under Sterling Price at Elkhorn Tavern. At mid-morning, without warning, a force of Union cavalry and three artillery pieces appeared to the south and began shelling the Confederate horsemen. McIntosh's cavalry launched a massed charge that overran the guns and scattered the outnumbered Federal cavalry. During the clash, Colonel Sims received a wound in the arm so command of the 9th passed to Lieutenant Colonel Quayle.

Screened by a belt of woods, McCulloch formed his division facing south in two lines. He placed his infantry in the first line and the cavalry units, including the 9th Texas, in the second line. At this time, Union artillery south of the woods began firing blindly over the trees, causing some casualties. Before launching an attack McCulloch rode into the woods to scout, rode into range of a group of Federal skirmishers, and was shot dead. Fearing that the soldiers might lose heart, McCulloch's staff foolishly did not notify the second-line regimental leaders. Informed of McCulloch's death, second-in-command McIntosh rode forward to lead the attack and was immediately killed. The first-line Confederate regimental commanders decided to await orders from the third-in-command Louis Hébert. Meanwhile, Hébert was now out of touch, leading several infantry units into the woods farther east. During the confused fighting, Hébert became separated from his troops and was later captured.

After several hours of idleness under a demoralizing shelling, the Confederate unit commanders finally found out about the deaths of their leaders at 3:00 pm. At this time, Albert Pike led some units on a roundabout path to join with Price's division, while other units marched back to camp. Quayle and the commanders of three other cavalry units and two artillery batteries refused to obey Pike's orders and remained on the field. During the night the 9th Texas and other units marched to join Van Dorn and Price at Elkhorn Tavern for the second day of battle.

=== Corinth ===
In mid-May 1862, 22,000 men from Van Dorn's army transferred to the east bank of the Mississippi River. At this time, the 9th Texas Cavalry numbered 657 effectives and was still led by Sims. It was dismounted to serve as infantry and took part in the Siege of Corinth, including a skirmish at Farmingham on 9 May 1862 and on several other occasions. The 9th was present during the Battle of Iuka on 19 September, but not engaged.

During the Second Battle of Corinth on 3–4 October 1862, the 9th Texas Cavalry served dismounted in Charles W. Phifer's brigade in the division of Dabney H. Maury. Also assigned to Phifer's brigade were the 3rd Arkansas and 6th Texas Cavalry Regiments (dismounted), Stirman's Arkansas Sharpshooter Battalion, and McNally's battery. In the first day's action, the 9th Texas captured a two gun section of John Welker's Battery H, 1st Missouri Light Artillery. On the second day, Phifer's soldiers attacked the Union lines a short distance east of Battery Robinett. The 6th and 9th Texas Cavalry fought two Ohio regiments from John W. Fuller's brigade. After Texans' first charge was stopped by a storm of bullets, they fell back about 20 yards and engaged in a furious fusillade. A second charge was also repulsed. The officers of the 6th and 9th regiments finally ordered a retreat after a terrific and costly fight with the two sides as close as eight yards apart. At Corinth, the 9th Texas reported losing 3 officers and 16 enlisted men killed, 12 officers and 41 men wounded, and 21 men missing, for a total of 93 casualties.

The 9th Texas Cavalry fought at the Battle of Hatchie's Bridge on 5 October. Leading Van Dorn's retreat, John Creed Moore's brigade was ambushed by Federals and lost 300 men on the west bank of the Hatchie River. Phifer's brigade, led by Sul Ross and William Lewis Cabell's brigade successfully defended the east bank, inflicting 570 casualties on the Union forces. In this contest, Ross's troops only sustained losses of seven killed and 22 wounded. In the two battles, Maury's division lost 2,500 out of 3,900 men. At Hatchie's Bridge, the 9th Texas reported losing 4 enlisted men wounded and 20 missing, for a total of 24 casualties.

=== Later operations ===
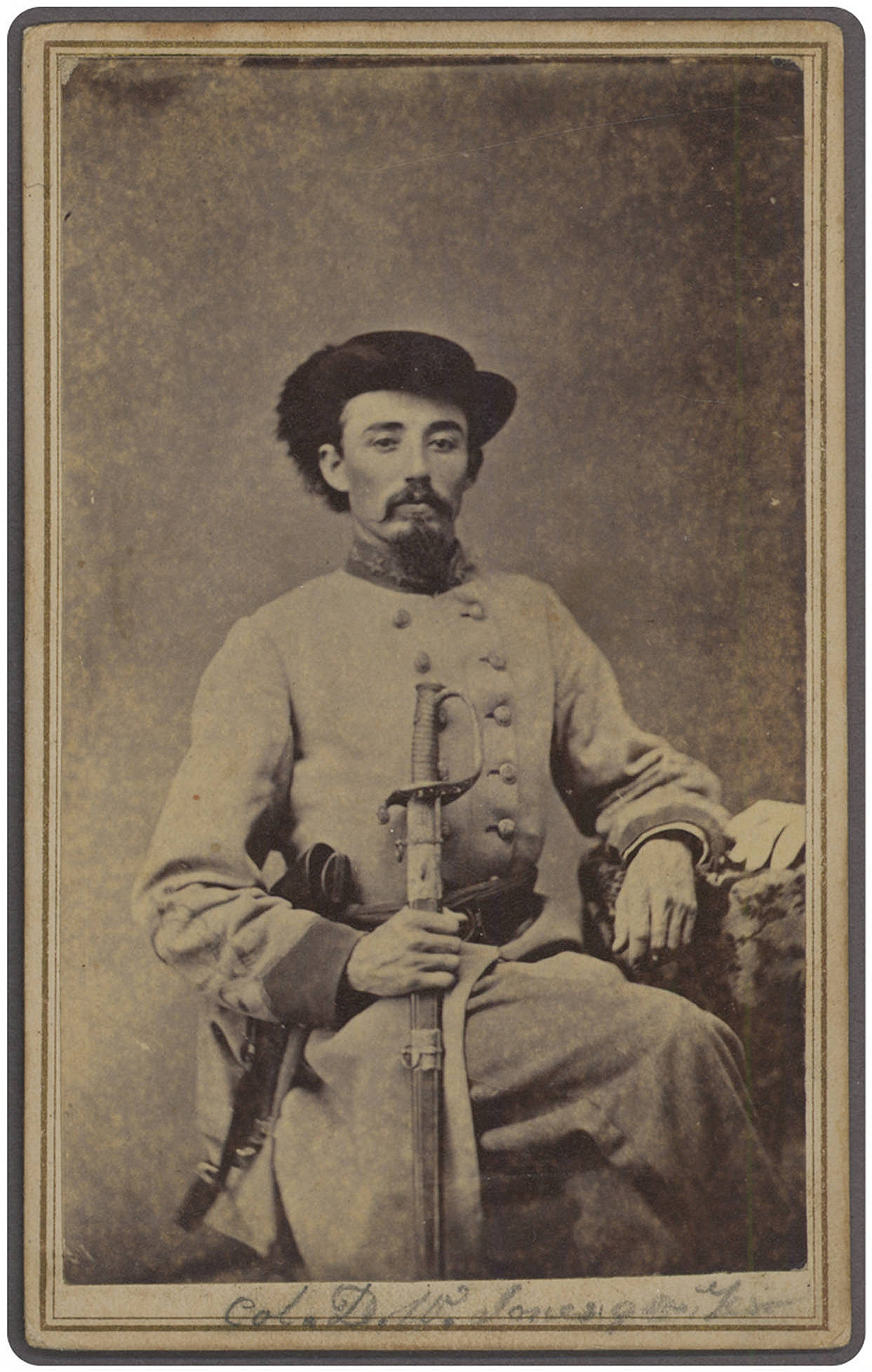
Col. Dudley W. Jones, 9th Texas Cavalry

A new Texas cavalry brigade formed on 23 October 1862 with John Wilkins Whitfield appointed to lead it. The brigade consisted of the 3rd Texas, 6th Texas, 9th Texas, and 27th Texas Cavalry Regiments. By December 1862, the regiment remounted and served in the Holly Springs Raid. In this operation, Van Dorn led 3,500 Confederate cavalry from Grenada to Holly Springs, Mississippi. Taking the Federal garrison by surprise, the Confederate horsemen captured 1,500 men and burned supplies worth US$1.5 million. The raiders continued north to Bolivar, Tennessee, attacking Union posts along the way, then they escaped to Grenada. The raid convinced Ulysses S. Grant to withdraw his army to Memphis.

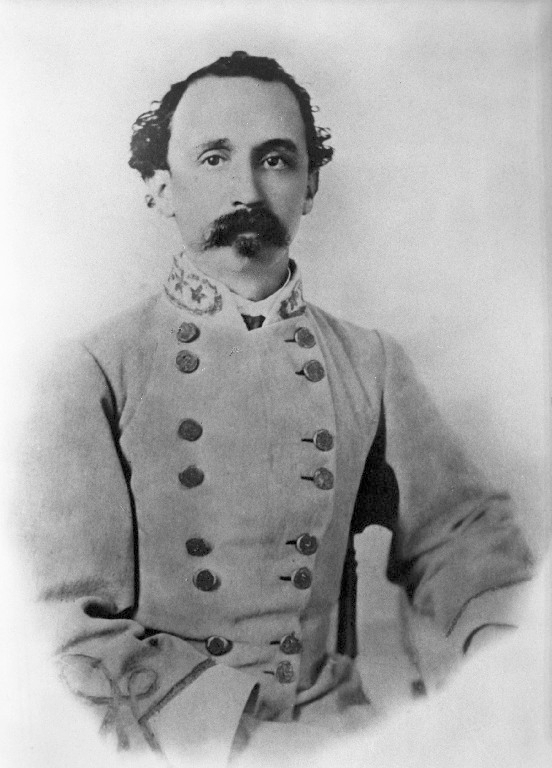
Gen. Sul Ross

On 5 March 1863, Whitfield's Texas cavalry brigade fought at the Battle of Thompson's Station. On 4 March, a Federal infantry brigade led by John Coburn marched south from Franklin, Tennessee on a reconnaissance. The Federals ran into elements of William Hicks Jackson's Confederate cavalry division, but continued to advance. The next morning Coburn's brigade approached Thompson's Station and drove Confederates from two hills north of town. At this time, the Union artillery and cavalry units suddenly left the field. Van Dorn ordered Jackson's troopers to dismount and attack Coburn's soldiers from the front, while Nathan Bedford Forrest's division circled around from behind. Forrest's men captured Coburn's wagon train and blocked the Union escape route. After fighting for five hours, the Federals surrendered when they ran out of ammunition. Confederate casualties numbered 357 while the Union troops lost 1,600 killed, wounded, and captured.

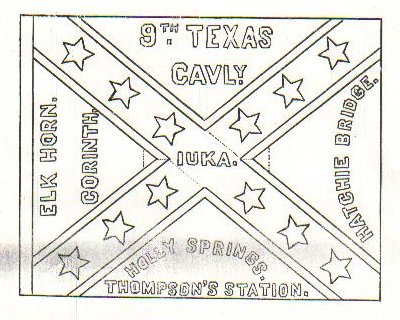
9th Texas Cavalry flag design

In May 1863, the regiment was part of Joseph E. Johnston army that tried unsuccessfully to relieve the Siege of Vicksburg. The unit fought in many skirmishes but there were no major actions. On 4 June 1863, W. H. Jackson reported that Whitfield's cavalry brigade numbered 123 officers and 1,354 men present for duty in the 3rd, 6th, 9th, and 27th Texas. The 9th Texas was commanded by Colonel Dudley W. Jones. In 1864 the regiment seized the gunboat USS Petrel. During the 1864 Atlanta campaign, the 9th Texas Cavalry under Colonel Jones was part of Lawrence Sullivan "Sul" Ross's brigade in W. H. Jackson's cavalry division. This unit transferred from Mississippi to Georgia with Leonidas Polk's corps at the start of the campaign. It was composed of the same units as Whitfield's brigade. Starting on 15 May 1864, for 112 days Ross's brigade was in continuous action.

The 9th Texas Cavalry took part in the Franklin–Nashville Campaign in late 1864, fighting at the Battle of Franklin on 30 November and the Third Battle of Murfreesboro on 5–7 December. The unit served as part of the rearguard during the retreat after the Battle of Nashville. In early 1865, the 9th Regiment was near Corinth, Mississippi. The Department of Alabama, Mississippi, and eastern Louisiana surrendered to Federal forces on 4 May 1865 and members of the regiment signed their paroles on 15 May.

== See also ==
- List of Texas Civil War Confederate units

== Notes ==
Footnotes

Citations
