= Dudley William Jones =

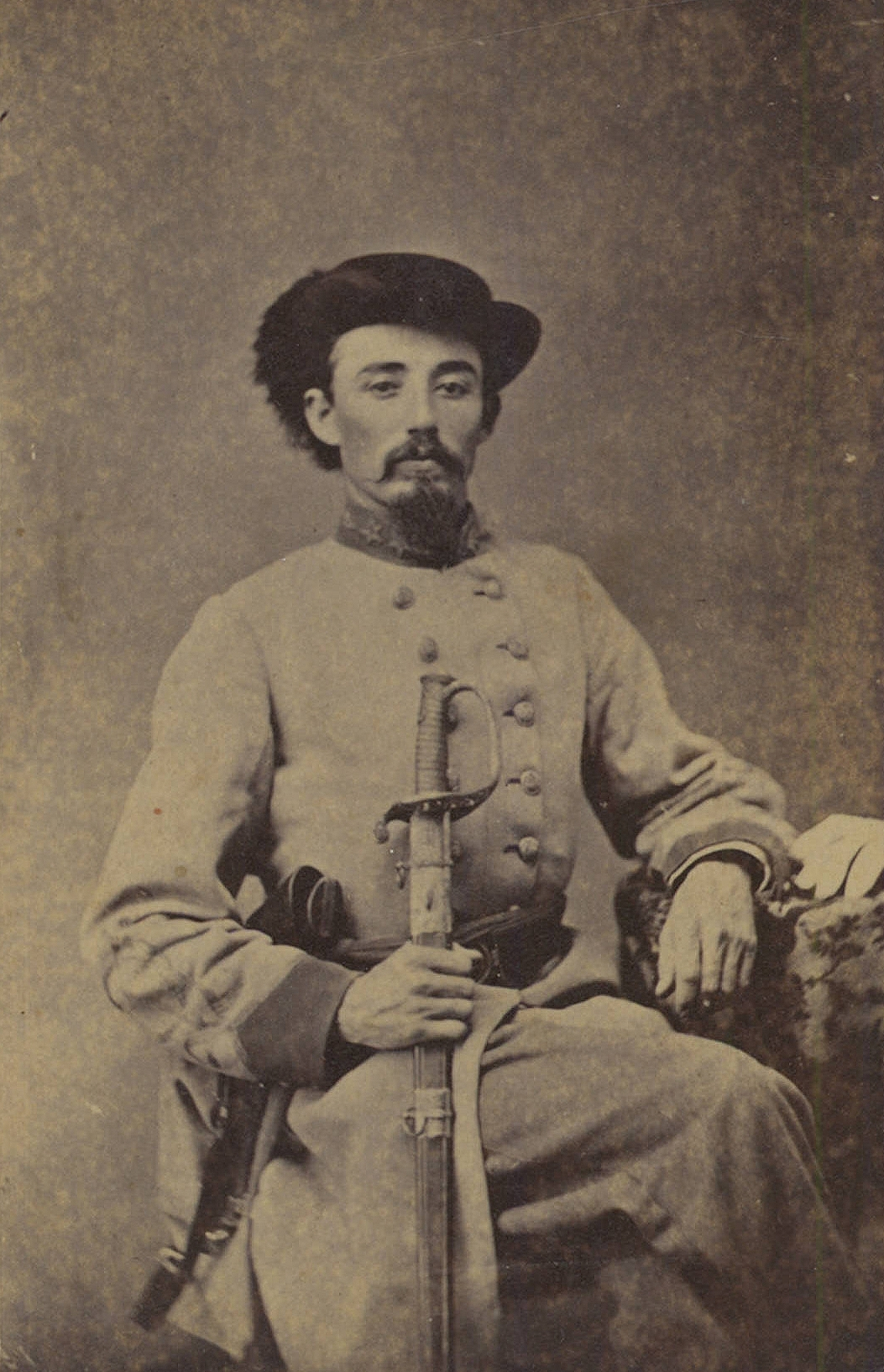
- Dudley W. Jones
- Born: 1840; Lamar County, Republic of Texas
- Died: 1869 (aged 28–29); Houston, Texas, US
- Military career
- Allegiance: Confederate States
- Branch: Confederate States Army
- Rank: Colonel
- Commands: 9th Texas Cavalry Regiment
- Battles: American Civil War

Dudley William Jones (1840–1869) was a Texan cavalry officer in the Confederate States Army during the American Civil War. Rising to the rank of colonel, he commanded the 9th Texas Cavalry in two successful engagements: at Thompson's Station, Tennessee, on March 5, 1863; and at Lovejoy's Station, Georgia, in July 1864. He also briefly commanded Ross's brigade at the close of the war.

== Life ==
Dudley William Jones, one of five children born to Henry Jones by his wife Martha, née Heron, was born in Lamar County, Republic of Texas, in 1840. (Note: Although Sid S. Johnson says he was "of Mt. Pleasant" and born in 1842.)

He was attending college at Maury Institute in Columbia, Tennessee, when the American Civil War began. Quitting his studies he left for Texas to tender his services to the South, and volunteered in the 9th Texas Cavalry commanded by Colonel W. B. Sims and served during the first year of the war in the campaign in the Indian Territory and in Missouri.

Upon the reorganization of the 9th Texas near Corinth, Mississippi, in 1862, while in his early twenties, he was elected Colonel of the regiment. The losses of this regiment were unusually severe, and at the close of the war nine out of every ten men who had started out with the command failed to respond at roll call.

Jones served in the first constitutional convention of Texas after the war, and his future seemed bright, but he died shortly afterward in the city of Houston, where he lies buried.

== Sources ==
- Cutrer, Thomas W. (1976; updated August 1, 2020). "Jones, Dudley William". Handbook of Texas. Texas State Historical Association (TSHA). Retrieved March 29, 2023.
- Johnson, Sid S. (1907). "D. W. Jones". Texans Who Wore the Gray. Vol. 1. p. 117.
