= Holly Springs Raid =

1862 American Civil War raid

- Part of the Western Theater of the American Civil War
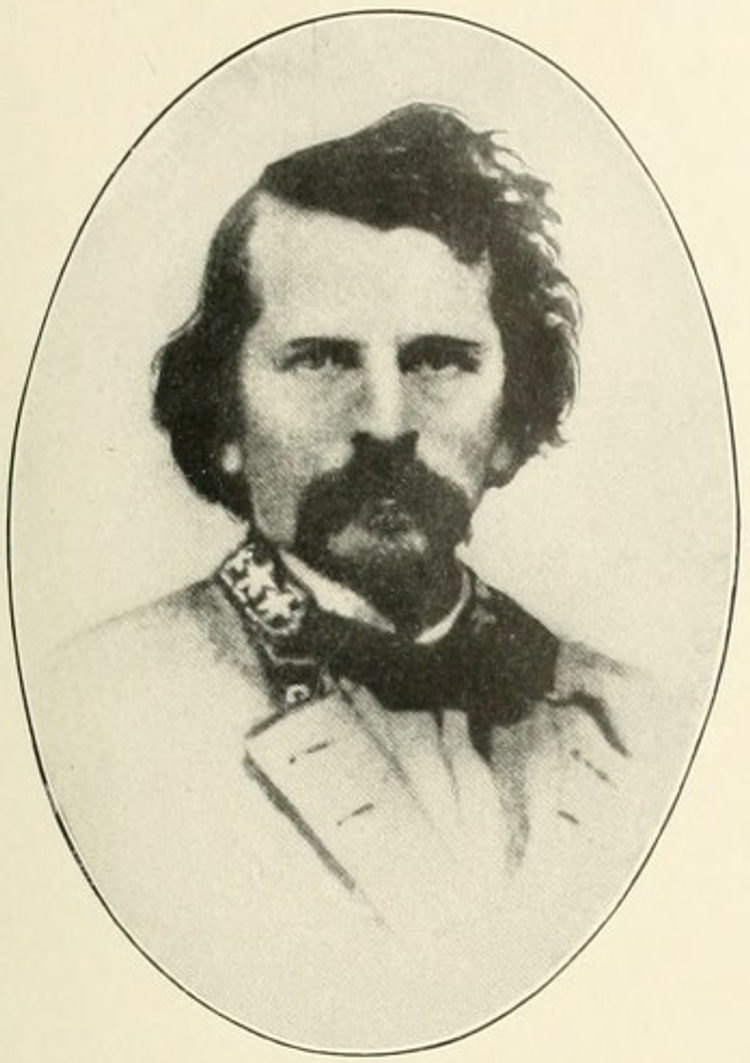
- Earl Van Dorn
Date	December 20, 1862
Location	Holly Springs, Mississippi 34°46′24″N 89°26′47″W
Result	Confederate victory

Belligerents
Confederate States	United States

Commanders and leaders
Earl Van Dorn	(United States) Robert C. Murphy

Strength
3,500	1,630

Casualties and losses
Negligible	1,500 captured

The Holly Springs Raid (December 20, 1862) saw Earl Van Dorn lead Confederate cavalry against a Union supply depot at Holly Springs, Mississippi during the American Civil War. The mounted raiders achieved complete surprise, capturing the Federal garrison and destroying $1.5 million of supplies intended for Ulysses S. Grant's army. In the following days, Van Dorn's troopers moved north along the Mississippi Central Railroad almost to Bolivar, Tennessee, destroying track and bridges, before escaping into northern Mississippi. The damage inflicted by the Holly Springs Raid together with the harm caused by Nathan Bedford Forrest's West Tennessee Raids forced Grant's Union army to withdraw to Memphis. Additionally, both Van Dorn and Forrest's raids obstructed the full implementation of Grant's controversial General Order No. 11 for weeks, preventing many Jewish people from being expelled from Grant's military district.

== Background ==
After Van Dorn's defeat in the Second Battle of Corinth on October 3–4, 1862, Confederate President Jefferson Davis named John C. Pemberton to lead the Department of Mississippi and East Louisiana and elevated him in rank to Lieutenant General. The promotion made Pemberton superior to Van Dorn. On October 25, Grant assumed command of the Department of Tennessee and a week later he started the Vicksburg campaign. By the end of October, Grant massed almost 50,000 Federal troops around Memphis and Corinth, Mississippi. Grant planned to move south along the Mississippi Central Railroad with 40,000 troops. As he awaited approval from Union General-in-chief Henry Halleck, Grant began concentrating five divisions at Grand Junction, Tennessee. When Halleck endorsed the plan and told Grant that 20,000 additional reinforcements were forthcoming, Grant decided to wait for the new troops. However, he sent James B. McPherson ahead with two divisions. Though a recent prisoner exchange swelled Van Dorn's strength to 24,000 troops, many of his soldiers were in poor health and the onset of cold weather increased the sick list.

On November 9, Van Dorn withdrew from Holly Springs to a new defensive line behind the Tallahatchie River. On December 1, Grant pressed forward again. A Federal force under Alvin Peterson Hovey steamed down the Mississippi River, landed at Greenville, Mississippi, and marched inland toward the railroad. Van Dorn retreated behind the Yalobusha River covering Grenada, only 120 mi (193 km) north of Vicksburg. At this time, Lieutenant Colonel John S. Griffiths of the 6th Texas Cavalry Regiment suggested raiding Grant's supply base at Holly Springs. Pemberton liked the idea and gave Van Dorn three brigades of cavalry to attempt the raid. He assigned Van Dorn's corps to Dabney H. Maury.

Meanwhile, President Abraham Lincoln authorized John A. McClernand to raise an army in the Midwestern states and lead it in an expedition against Vicksburg. McClernand's program was successful in recruiting large numbers of Union soldiers, which were forwarded to Memphis. The problem was that McClernand's expedition would be operating in a department commanded by Grant, a violation of the principle of Unity of command. Furthermore, neither Grant nor General-in-chief Henry Halleck liked McClernand. Halleck told Grant that all troops in the department were his to command. Grant ordered William Tecumseh Sherman to take the soldiers at Memphis down the Mississippi River, enter the Yazoo River, and assault Vicksburg from the north. On 18 December, Halleck telegraphed Grant that the troops at Memphis were to be organized into two corps, one under McClernand and one under Sherman. Grant notified McClernand at Springfield, Illinois that he should go to Memphis to take charge of the expedition since he outranked everyone in the department except Grant. However, before the message was sent the telegraph lines were cut by Forrest's cavalry raid. Sherman left Memphis on December 20 with 32,000 troops.

== Van Dorn's Raid ==
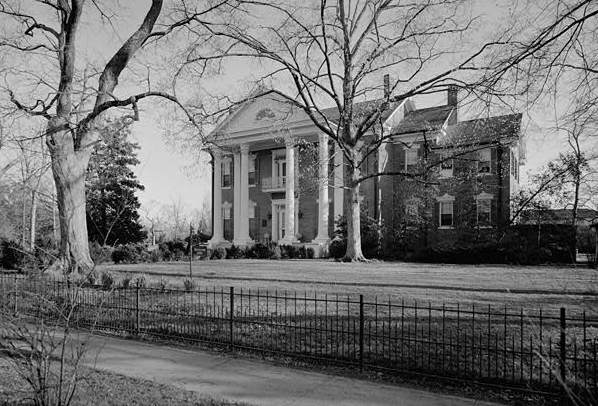
Montrose, an antebellum mansion in Holly Springs, was built in 1858.

Van Dorn left Grenada on December 16 with 3,500 cavalrymen in three brigades. Colonel John Wilkins Whitfield commanded the Texas brigade which consisted of the 3rd Texas, 6th Texas, 9th Texas, and 27th Texas Cavalry Regiments. The Texas brigade under the temporary leadership of Griffiths numbered 1,500 men. William Hicks Jackson led a brigade of 1,200 Tennessee cavalry and Robert McCulloch led a brigade of 800 horsemen from Arkansas, Mississippi, and Missouri. The raiders first marched east in order to get around the Union flank. They arrived in Houston, Mississippi at noon on December 17. Turning to the north, Van Dorn's column reached Pontotoc on December 18. After passing New Albany, the raiders swung west and rested 12 to 15 mi (19 to 24 km) from Holly Springs in the evening.

The Union commander of Holly Springs, Colonel Robert C. Murphy of the 8th Wisconsin Volunteer Infantry Regiment, was warned that a Confederate force was at large, but he failed to alert his garrison. Before the Battle of Iuka in September 1862, Murphy abandoned a large amount of supplies at Iuka. Grant forgave him that blunder because of his inexperience. There were three groupings of Union troops in Holly Springs, none within supporting distance of each other. Six companies of cavalry were camped on the edge of town, while the infantry were camped at the courthouse and at the train station.

Van Dorn divided his horsemen into three columns. He ordered the first column to immediately attack the first infantry camp. The second column would bypass the infantry camp, charge into the town, take the street leading to the fair grounds, and attack the cavalry camp. The third column would gallop through town and charge the infantry at the public square. At dawn on December 20, the first and third columns quickly overran the infantry camps. The second column hit the Union cavalry as they were undergoing an inspection. The Federal horsemen put up a brief fight before they were overwhelmed. By 8:00 am, the fighting was over and the raiders broke into the food supplies or helped themselves to brand-new weapons. The spoils included three full freight trains waiting to be unloaded. The Confederates captured 1,500 Union soldiers and immediately paroled them. Approximately US$1,500,000 worth of supplies were put to the torch. Only 130 Union soldiers managed to avoid capture.

When he heard about the raid, Grant said, "I want those fellows caught, if possible," and ordered columns of pursuit. Following up his success, Van Dorn continued moving north along the railroad toward Bolivar, capturing Union soldiers posted along the line and wrecking the track and bridges. The only check to Van Dorn's progress occurred at Davis' Mills where Colonel W. H. Morgan and 300 Union soldiers guarded a trestle bridge across the Wolf River. Defending a blockhouse and a fortified Indian mound Morgan's men inflicted losses of 22 killed, 30 wounded, and 20 captured on the raiders while only losing three men wounded. Van Dorn bypassed Davis' Mills and continued almost to Bolivar before turning back through Van Buren and Saulsbury, Tennessee. The raiders evaded a Federal pursuit column south of Ripley, Mississippi and returned safely to Grenada on December 28.

== Result ==
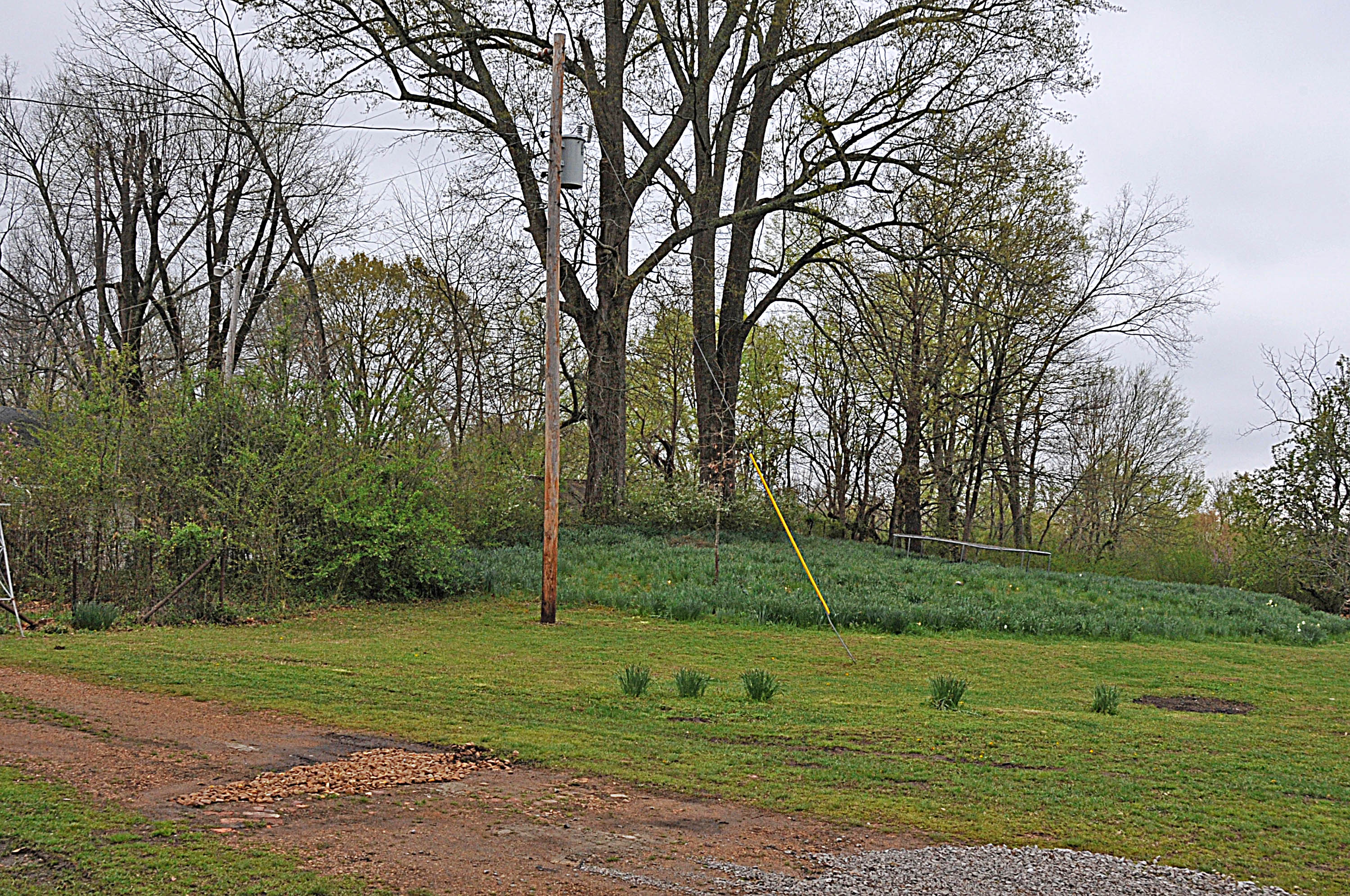
Indian mound at Davis' Mills

As historian Shelby Foote described it, "Van Dorn having destroyed his supplies on hand and Forrest having made it impossible for him to bring up any more," Grant was compelled to retreat. Grant remarked that, "it could not be expected that men, with arms in their hands, would starve in the midst of plenty." In order to feed his soldiers, the Union general sent out escorted wagons to take food and forage from a swath 15 mi (24 km) wide on either side of the railroad line. Skeptical at first that this would bring in much food, Grant was astonished at the result. The wagons returned loaded with all kinds of food that had been seized from the local inhabitants. Grant found that his soldiers might have survived for two months on what was taken; he wrote, "This taught me a lesson."

With Grant's thrust defeated, Pemberton was free to send troops to block Sherman's river expedition. Sherman's troops went ashore on December 26. In the Battle of Chickasaw Bayou on December 29, Pemberton repulsed Sherman's soldiers rather handily, inflicting 1,700 casualties. McClernand finally caught up with his expedition after Sherman withdrew the troops to the west bank of the river. After the Holly Springs disaster, Murphy complained, "I have done all in my power - in truth, my force was inadequate." Grant dismissed the hapless Murphy from the army for cowardly and disgraceful conduct.

== General Order No. 11 ==
Van Dorn's raid nearly coincided with General Order No. 11, issued by Grant on 17 December 1862. This order expelled Jews as a class from Grant's military district within 24 hours. Grant believed that Jewish traders violated U.S. Treasury Department cotton trade regulations. Van Dorn's raid disrupted Union communications lines for weeks. Additionally, Confederate General Nathan Bedford Forrest's West Tennessee Raids, starting December 10, destroyed communications along fifty miles of the Mobile and Ohio Railroad behind Grant's front line. The raids delayed implementation of Grant's General Orders No. 11, saving many Jews from possible expulsion. It took 11 days for the order to reach Paducah, Kentucky, after which local Jewish leaders appealed directly to President Abraham Lincoln. At Lincoln's insistence, General-in-Chief Henry Halleck ordered Grant to revoke General Order No. 11. When Grant ran for president in 1868, the order proved to be such an embarrassment that he disavowed it.
