= 1st Arkansas Cavalry Battalion =

Confederate Army cavalry battalion during the American Civil War

1st Arkansas Cavalry Battalion (Stirman's)
- Country: Confederate States of America
- Allegiance: CSA
- Branch: Cavalry
- Engagements: American Civil War: Pea Ridge Campaign Battle of Pea Ridge; Iuka-Corinth Campaign Battle of Corinth Battle of Hatchie's Bridge; Vicksburg Campaign; Battle of Port Gibson; Siege of Vicksburg; Red River Campaign; Battle of Poison Spring; Battle of Marks' Mills; Battle of Jenkins Ferry; Price's Missouri Raid; Battle of Fort Davidson; Fourth Battle of Boonville; Battle of Glasgow, Missouri; Battle of Sedalia; Second Battle of Lexington; Battle of Little Blue River; Second Battle of Independence; Battle of Byram's Ford; Battle of Westport; Battle of Marais des Cygnes, Linn County, Kansas; Battle of Mine Creek; Battle of Marmiton River; Second Battle of Newtonia; Battle of Dardanelle

The 1st Arkansas Cavalry Battalion (Stirman's) (1864–1865) was a Confederate Army cavalry battalion during the American Civil War. The unit was also known as Brooks 1st Arkansas Cavalry Battalion, Stirman's, 1st Arkansas Cavalry Battalion, Stirman's Sharpshooter Regiment, 1st Regiment Arkansas Sharpshooters, and finally simply as Stirman's Arkansas Cavalry Regiment.

== Organization ==
1st (Brooks') Cavalry Battalion was recruited in Carroll, Marion, Pope, Scott, Van Buren, and Washington counties, Arkansas, from August to October 1861 under the command of Major William H. Brooks. Many of the enlistments are from August to October 1861:

Company A, - from Marion County and Carroll County, commanded by Capt. John R. Conlee. All enlistments were 3 Aug 1861.
Company B, - from Marion County and Carroll County, commanded by Capt. John J. Clarke. All enlistments were 3 Aug 1861.
Company C, - the "Crawford County Rangers", from Van Buren County and Carroll County, Capt. Thomas B. Brantley. Commanded by All enlistments were 11 Oct 1861.
Company D, - from Fayetteville, Washington County, Commanded by Capt. Larkin P. Beavert. All enlistments were 26 Oct 1861.
Company E, - the "Davis Light Horse", from Fayetteville, Washington County, this company was originally commanded by Captain William H. Brooks. Brooks was elected Major of the battalion upon formation and he was succeeded as Captain by Second Lieutenant Ras Stirman. Stirman would later succeed Brooks as commander of the battalion. All enlistments were 9 Oct 1861.

== Service ==
In January, 1862, the battalion totalled 300 officers and men and was assigned to L. Hebert's Brigade in the western part of Arkansas. The battalion was apparently stationed in Fayetteville Arkansas, before that city was occupied by Union Forces on 23 February 1862.

During the Battle of Pea Ridge, the battalion was assigned to Brigadier General James M. McIntosh's Brigade of Brigadier General Benjamin McCulloch Division. After fighting at the Battle of Pea Ridge, the unit was ordered east of the Mississippi River and dismounted. Private Albert McCollum described the retreat from Pea Ridge, dismounting and boarding of ships to move east of the Mississippi River as follows:

From Lees Creek we went to Van Buren, from there to Clarksville and then to Dover. There we camped 8 days. Then we had a happy time getting across the pintry moove bottom. (Point Remove). From Dover we went to Springfield, then to Searcy in White County, then to Des Arc i n Prairie Co. We were dismounted at Searcy. The horses was sent back to Dover. Vie were put on a boat at Searcy, on Little Red River which runs into White River about 30 or 35miles above Des Arc. White River is out of its banks down here. The boat is loading now to take us to Memphis. I expect we will start tomorrow. The Major said we would draw pay at Memphis. The Vicksburg (that is the name of the boat) is 220 ft long & about 60 ft wide."

=== Creation of the Sharpshooters ===
Late April and early May 1862 the Confederate Army underwent an army-wide reorganization due to the passage of the Conscription Act by the Confederate Congress in April 1862. All twelve-month regiments had to re-muster and enlist for three years or the duration of the war; a new election of officers was ordered; and men who were exempted from service by age or other reasons under the Conscription Act were allowed to take a discharge and go home. Officers who did not choose to stand for re-election were also offered a discharge. At this time Major Brooks was granted a medical leave and Captain Stirman, of Company E, was elected to lead the battalion. Major W.H. Brooks of Brooks Arkansas Battalion of Cavalry is authorized 30 days leave [for health reasons].

GENERAL ORDERS, WAR DEPARTMENT, ADJT. AND INSP. GENERAL'S OFFICE, No. 34. Richmond, Va., May 3, 1862.

I. The following act of Congress and accompanying regulations are published for the information of all concerned:

AN ACT to organize battalions of sharpshooters.

SECTION 1. The Congress of the Confederate States of America do enact, That the Secretary of War may cause to be organized a battalion of sharpshooters for each brigade, consisting of not less than three nor more than six companies, to be composed of men selected from the brigade or otherwise, and armed with longrange muskets or rifles, said companies to be organized, and the commissioned officers therefor appointed by the President, by and with the advice, and consent of the Senate. Such battalions shall constitute parts of the brigades to which they belong, and shall have such field and staff officers as are authorized by law for similar battalions, to be appointed by the President, by and with the advice and consent of the Senate.

SEC. 2. Be it further enacted, That for the purpose of arming the said battalions, the long-range muskets and rifles in the hands of the troops, may be taken for that purpose: Provided, The Government has not at its command a sufficient number of approved long-range rifles or muskets wherewith to arm said corps.

Approved April 21, 1862.

II. Generals commanding military departments may cause to be organized within their commands battalions of sharpshooters, as provided in this act, in such numbers as they may deem necessary, not exceeding one such battalion for each brigade, and will report to the Department the organization of such corps, recommending for appointment the commissioned officers allowed by law.

III. In organizing such battalions generals commanding may cause such details or transfers to be made as will not reduce any company or corps below the minimum number required by law, taking the men for each such battalion so far as possible from the particular brigade of which it is to form a part.

IV. Requisitions will be made upon the Ordnance Department for the arms for such battalions, and until the said requisitions can be filled the generals commanding may cause such exchanges and transfers of long-range muskets and rifles to be made as may be necessary to arm the said battalions, returning surplus arms when such requisitions are filled to the Ordnance Department.

V. (Supplementary to General Orders, No. 30, section VI.) The commissions of the staff officers of reorganized regiments and battalions of twelve-months' volunteers are not affected by such reorganization, except that of the adjutant, whose commission expires with that of the commanding officer, if the said officer be not re-elected.

By command of the Secretary of War: S. COOPER,

Adjutant and Inspector General.

Special Orders of Gen Van Dorn-Army of the West

1. s 54-118 April 18-June 19, 1862
1. 97 May 24

Par XI-Each brigade commander will at once organize a company of selected sharpshooters to be attached to each battery and carefully drilled as skirmishers and armed with long range rifles.

1. 98 May 25

Par VII-Williamson's Battalion is broken up-those companies designated by brigade commander are assigned to 3rd Arkansas Cavalry, one company to McCray's Battalion, and balance to Brooks' battalion.

1. 105 June 4

Capt. Catterson's company of Arkansas cavalry transferred from Whitfield's Texas Legion to Brooks Battalion of Arkansas Cavalry

1. 115 June 15

As it is at present impracticable to organize a battalion of sharpshooters for each brigade as contemplated in general order #34 from the War Dept., each division commander will designate one regiment from each brigade to act as sharpshooters. They will be particularly instructed and armed with long range arms.

General Van Dorn dismounted much of his Cavalry. Brook's 1st Battalion of Arkansas Cavalry, Company I, 6th Texas Cavalry, Company H, 9th Texas Cavalry and Company B, 27th Texas Cavalry were among those dismounted. These companies were the basis for a future Sharpshooter Regiment.

The designation, Sharpshooter Battalion, was a surprise, as was the addition of another company transferred in from Whitfield's Regiment, Texas Cavalry on June 4, 1862. This company was Murphy's or Catterson's Company B, Arkansas Cavalry. It was soon designated Company H.

General Van Dorn of the Trans-Mississippi Department of the Confederate States of America, issued Special Order # 114, June 15, 1862. It read, "As it is at present impracticable to organize a battalion of sharpshooters for each brigade as contemplated in General Order # 34 from the War Department - each division commander will designate one regiment from each brigade to act as sharpshooters. They will be particularly instructed … and carry long range arms."

General Maury's Division sent out Special Order #59 dated August 1, 1862, stating, "Paragraph II, Major Bridges Battalion of Sharpshooters will at once be consolidated with Lieutenant Colonel Stirman's Battalion of Arkansas Cavalry (dismounted) and the whole to be under the command of Lt Col Stirman as the regiment of Sharpshooters of Phifer's Brigade."

Captain Bridges was the commander of Company I, 6th Texas Cavalry, from his election in September, 1861, until June, 1862. In June the company was detached, and Bridges was promoted to major in command of a sharpshooter battalion. Company H, 9th Texas Cavalry, was a second company attached to his command and Company B, Whitfield's Legion went straight to Stirman's Battalion on 4 June 1862. On August 1, 1862, Bridges was promoted to lieutenant colonel of Sharpshooters. At the same time his companies became part of Colonel Erasmus J. Stirman's Regiment of Sharpshooters for Colonel Charles W. Phifer's Brigade. Bridges became the deputy commander. At this time Col. Ras Stirman commanded a ten company regiment all dressed in grey as he described it in a letter to his sister, Rebecca, in camp, August 10, 1862, near Tupelo, Mississippi.

The battalions were encamped at Camp Maury in May–July 1862. After that, they were probably at Camp Armstrong though this is not documented at this time. In September, they were at Camp Rodgers, Mississippi, near Tupelo, Mississippi and camp Baldwin, Mississippi, on 24 September probably near Holly Springs. The men trained as sharpshooters, skirmishers, and as infantry as they moved closer to Corinth.

Early in September, Colonel Stirman led his regiment sharpshooters on a 60-mile circuitous route from Saltillo toward Iuka, Mississippi. They advanced with each company having a turn in front as skirmishers. At Iuka, they took up positions near the town, ready to fight. Captain James Bates of Company K (H/9th) says in his diary they could see the battle, which would have placed them on the northwest side of Iuka. Leading General Price's Army, the 3rd Texas Cavalry and 1st Texas Legion ran into a full Union division northwest of Iuka. After fighting all day, General Price was ready to continue, but General Van Dorn directed that they break off the battle and join his force on the way to Corinth.

Two weeks later the sharpshooters were probably spread as skirmishers across the front of Phifer's Brigade when the Battle of Corinth began on October 3, 1863. They steadily pushed the Union forces back, and at dark were only 300 yards from the main lines. During the fight, they lost Lieutenant Colonel Bridges who received a severe wound to his right arm. He had to be helped from the field and sent to the hospital in Quitman. The regiment slept on their weapons ready to fight. If they had anything they ate, water was in short supply and ammunition was scrounged from those that had fallen.

The sharpshooters were reformed into a line infantry regiment on the left flank of Phifer's Brigade for the last day of battle, October 4. The attack kicked off at 10:30 a.m., and the regiment quickly captured the four-gun 10th Ohio Artillery Battery to its front. A seam existed between the 50th Illinois Brigade of DuBois' Division and the 39th Ohio Brigade of Fuller's Division of Union forces. The regiment, receiving fire from three directions, drove toward the center of the town. Their losses mounted, but the regiment gained the Tishomingo Hotel with Ras Stirman planting the regimental flag in front of the hotel. They had pushed General Rosecrans from his headquarters. Then came Union rallies, and the regiment weak from losses, low on ammunition and water, began to retreat. Ras Stirman and Major White were the last two to leave the hotel, located about a hundred yards behind Battery Robinett. The remnants of the regiment made it to the Confederate lines at dark.

The following morning Stirman's Sharpshooters were third in the line of march of the Confederate Army in retreat. They made the Hatchie Bridge at Davis' farm, Tennessee, when cannon fire opened from their front and flank. Ahead, the First Texas Legion and Moore's Brigade with Adam's skirmishers and Dawson's St Louis Battery of 4 guns, were being mauled by the Union blocking force. Many were captured or killed. The rest chose to scatter and swim the river or drown trying. Major Hawkins of the 1st Legion, was able to lead a small detachment back, but most of the Legion were captured or killed. The sharpshooters ran the gauntlet of the bridge and took up positions on the bluff above the river. The 6th Texas and Colonel Ross fought a delaying action allowing the remaining pieces of Moore's Brigade to re-cross as did Hawkins' troops. Most of a brigade and the Legion had been killed or captured.

Now it was the Confederate turn. The sharpshooters, well positioned, were pouring fire into the attacking Union regiment that had crossed the bridge. Two more regiments crossed, but had no place to maneuver. If they moved, they were fired upon. Cabel's Brigade came on line with artillery. This, added to the 6th Texas and the soldiers of Moore and Hawkins troops and the one cannon that Dawson was able to bring back, was enough to halt the Union force and to allow Van Dorn's Army to find a new crossing and escape back into Mississippi.

For some reason, the highly successful Stirman Sharpshooter Regiment was broken up. The two Texas companies returned to their home regiments. Soldiers were returning from parole, wounded were healing, and the return of horses from Texas, they were soon able to go on the Holly Springs Raid and make the move into Tennessee in 1863 as part of the Texas Brigade and Van Dorn's Corps.

Stirman's Battalion was at Camp Donaldson, Mississippi, in January as dismounted cavalry. Company B, 27th Texas Cavalry, never returned to the Legion. It was originally an Arkansas company, so it stayed with Stirman's Battalion as Company H. The Legion never replaced the company and went the rest of the war without a Company B. Stirman's Battalion records at the National Archives are not complete for the period May through December 1862. Many of the records for Companies A through G are lost from muster to January 1863. Thus their efforts at Corinth and Hatchie Bridge go unremembered. Their dead and wounded lost in history.

Company I, 6th Texas Cavalry, continued to fight till January, 1865, when it was combined with Company K. Its officers resigned or transferred. Of its 102 men, six were killed in battle, twenty were wounded, five died of wounds, and twelve were made prisoners. Four deserted, twenty were discharged or dropped, and at parole in Jackson, Mississippi, 15 May 1865, thirteen were present and thirty-three were on leave or had deserted after returning from the Tennessee Campaign. Two were missing, and three had transferred to other units. Illness had caused eighteen deaths.

Company H, 9th Texas, had a large desertion in August–September, 1863, when it lost thirty-seven men. Only three returned. The remainder of its company was placed in support of the regimental headquarters. Four had died in battle, and three had died of wounds. One had transferred, and six had no records after 1862. Additionally, fifteen had been discharged or dropped, and eleven died of illness. Ten men were paroled at Jackson, Mississippi, and three from northern prisons. Of 106 men, nineteen had deserted or were on leave in 1865 when no record was kept.

Stirman's Battalion, 1st Battalion Arkansas Cavalry (dismounted), continued to on fight as infantry and sharpshooters with distinguished service at Vicksburg. The battalion designated Bridge's Arkansas Cavalry and listed in the Vicksburg Order of Battle was not the original Bridge's Battalion and was likely not under Pemberton's command, but instead, the ad hoc unit probably authorized by Stephen D. Lee. This was Henry W. Bridges, of the 6th Texas Cavalry, but without his Texas Cavalry companies, I/6th; H/9th. They were not in the Vicksburg siege area, and the companies may not have been from Arkansas.

On June 11, 1862, Major General Earl Van Dorn, commanding the Confederate Army of the West at Priceville, Mississippi, issued General Orders, No. 39, calling for the organization of a battalion of sharpshooters in each brigade of the army.

These Battalions will be made up of chosen men, all of whom must be able-bodied, active and good rifle shots and of tried courage ... All of the officers of the Battalion will be carefully selected and thoroughly examined before being recommended to the President for promotion or appointment to the Battalion. It is desired to bring the effective strength of each Battalion up to seven hundred and fifty (750) rank and file, if possible, and no pains will be spared to make the Battalions the elite of the Army of the West. An opportunity is therefore now afforded to young men of spirit to enroll themselves in a corps which is unquestionably to become the most distinguished in our Army. It is hoped and expected that no man will offer or be accepted into this select corps who is not resolved to lead in every daring enterprise which may be undertaken. Brigade Commanders will commence enrolling the Sharpshooters at once. Every proper means will be taken to fill up the Battalions as soon as possible. The men and officers of each company will be from the same State. The Brigade ordnance officers will see that the Sharpshooters are equipped with long range guns, and if possible that the guns of each company are of uniform calibre.

A sharpshooter battalion was not an organization of "snipers", as the word "sharpshooter" now implies. These organizations were skirmishers, scouts who operated in open, or "skirmish" order in front of the brigade or division line of battle to search out and find the enemy force, test its strength, and maintain contact so as to prevent surprise and guide the main battle line to the key spot on the field.

General Earl Van Dorn seemed to be intent on forming sharpshooter battalions for the brigades of the Army of the West during this time period. Van Dorn issued special order #114 of June 15, 1862, as follows:

As it is at present impracticable to organize a battalion of sharpshooters for each brigade as contemplated in Gen Order #34 from the War Dept.-each division commander will designate one regiment from each brigade to act as sharpshooters. They will be particularly instructed...and carry long range arms.

Special Order of Maury's Division dated 1 August 1862: "Par II Major Bridges battalion of sharpshooters will at once be consolidated with LtCol Stirman's battalion of Arkansas Cavalry [dismounted] and the whole to be under the command of LtCol Stirman as the regiment of sharpshooters for Phifer's brigade."

1st (Stirman's) Battalion Sharpshooters, formerly Brooks' 1st Arkansas Cavalry Battalion, was organized during the summer of 1862. In July Company H (Murphy's Company B) was added from Whitfield's Texas Cavalry Regiment. This Arkansas Company had been attached to the Texas unit by General McCulloch. Stirman's Battalion was assigned to Phiffer's Brigade for the Corinth Campaign. On August 1, 1862, Bridges' Battalion of Texas Sharpshooters was attached to Stirman's Battalion to make a 10 company Sharpshooter regiment. The unit was commanded by Colonel Ras.Stirman, Major Lafayette Boone and Lieutenant Colonel Henry W. Bridges.

The Sharpshooter Regiment was created by combination of the following units:

Company A, - from Marion County and Carroll County, commanded by Capt. John R. Conlee; formerly Co. A, 1st Arkansas Battalion.
Company B, - from Marion County and Carroll County, commanded by Capt. John J. Clarke; formerly Co. B, 1st Arkansas Battalion.
Company C, - from Van Buren County and Carroll County, Capt. Thomas B. Brantley; formerly Co. C, 1st Arkansas Battalion.
Company D, - from Fayetteville, Washington County, Commanded by Capt. Larkin P. Beavert; formerly Co. D, 1st Arkansas Battalion.
Company E, - from Fayetteville, Washington County, Commanded by Capt. George C. Robards; formerly Co. E, 1st Arkansas Battalion.
Company F, - from Russellville, Pope County, Commanded by Capt. John G. Spivey; formerly Co. D, Williamson's Arkansas Infantry Battalion. All enlistment were 15 Feb 1862.
Company G, - from Pope County, Commanded by Capt. James F. Stout; formerly Co. D, Williamson's Arkansas Infantry Battalion. All enlistments were 15 Feb 1862.
Company H, - from Waldron, Scott County, Arkansas, Commanded by Capt. William H. Catterson; formerly Co. B, 27th Texas Cavalry. All enlistments were 19 Oct 1861. This company was organized in Arkansas but had become attached to the 27th Texas earlier.
Company I, - from Dallas and Henderson Counties, Texas, Commanded by Capt. Henry W. Bridges; formerly Co. I, 6th Texas Cavalry Enlistments 6 Sept 1861.
Company K, - from eight north Texas counties, Commanded by Capt. James C. Bates; formerly Co. H, 9th Texas Cavalry. Enlistments on 13 Oct 1861.

The Field and Staff Officers were:

Stirman, Erasmus I,Colonel.
Bridges, Henry W, Lieutenant-Colonel.
Boone, Lafayette, Major.
Calhoun, William B, Captain, Assistant Quartermaster.
McKissick, John H, Captain, Assistant Commissary of Subsistence.
Marsh, J Frank, Captain, Assistant Surgeon.
Taylor, Philip H, First Lieutenant, Adjutant.

The Sharpshooter Regiment trained through the Battle of Iuka without entering that battle. On October 3, 1862, the regiment was on the left flank of Phiffer's Brigade for the Battle of Corinth. Trained as skirmishers and sharpshooters, they would normally have spread out across the regimental front and preceded the regiment into battle. It is not known how they fought on the 3rd but Lt Col Henry Bridges was wounded in the arm and had to be helped from the field. On the 4th they were aligned as an Infantry Regiment on the left flank, and fought into the heart of Corinth. Peter Cozzens in his book on the Battle of Corinth, stated that Colonel Stirman planted the regimental flag in front of the Tishomingo Hotel which was past General Rosecran's headquarters. If this happened Stirman's unit had almost won the battle. Lack of ammunition and men soon caused Stirman to retreat. The next day, the regiment was the 4th unit to cross the Hatchie Bridge in Tennessee. Suddenly a Union blocking force opened up and cannon and rifle fire covered the area. The regiment reversed and raced across the bridge to assume firing positions. Along with the 6th Texas Cavalry Regiment (dismounted) they formed the base for a Confederate blocking force. Several units of Van Dorn's command had been lost, and many of Stirman's men had been killed or captured, but the regiment was a great factor in saving the day.

Sirman's Arkansas Sharpshooters are listed as belonging to Brigadier General C.W. Phifer's Brigade of Brigadier General Dabney Maury's Division of Major General Sterling Price's Army of the West, during the Battle of Corinth.

On 20 October 1862, Major General Sterling Price, commanding the Confederate Army of the West, reported Stirman's Arkansas Sharpshooters as belonging to Brigadier General Lousi Hebert's First Brigade of Brigadier General J.S. Bowen's Division.

Stirman's Arkansas Sharpshooters were transferred to Col Cavern's Second Brigade, of Brigadier General J.S. Bowen's Division of the Confederate Army of the West on 22 October 1862.

=== Return to Cavalry (dismounted) ===
Two weeks later the regiment was reduced to battalion size as the Texas units returned to their regiments. The unit was then attached to General M.E. Bgrann's command, Department of Mississippi and East Louisiana, and fought at the Battle of Port Gibson and the siege of Vicksburg.

The battalion surrendered with the Army of Mississippi at Vicksburg, Mississippi, July 4, 1863. General U. S. Grant initially demanded the conditional surrender of the Vicksburg garrison, but faced with the necessity of feeding 30,000 starving Confederates and having the idea that these soldiers might do more harm to the Confederate cause by being released to return home rather than being exchanged as whole units, he relented and allowed for the immediate parole of the unit. According to the Confederate War Department, Union leader encouraged the surrendered confederates to simply return home, rather than being officially paroled and exchanged. The able bodied Confederate soldiers who were released on parole walked out of Vicksburg (they were not allowed to proceed in any military formations) on July 11, 1863. Paroling of these able bodied men was completed in their respective regimental camps inside Vicksburg prior to July 11.

Confederate commanders designated Enterprise, Mississippi, as the rendezvous point (parole camp) for the Vicksburg parolees to report to after they got clear of the last Federal control point at Big Black Bridge. Most of the Arkansas units appeared to have bypassed the established parole camps, and possibly with the support or at least by the compliance of their Union captors, simply crossed the river and returned home. Because so many of the Vicksburg parolees, especially from Arkansas, simply went home, Major General Pemberton requested Confederate president Davis to grant the men a thirty- to sixty-day furlough. The furloughs were not strictly adhered to so long as the soldier eventually showed up at a parole camp to be declared exchanged and returned to duty. Those who went directly home were treated as if they had been home on furlough if they eventually reported into one of these two parole centers. The exchange declaration reports issued by Colonel Robert Ould in Richmond for various units in the Vicksburg and Port Hudson surrenders began in September 1863 based upon men who actually reported into one of the two parole camps. Pemberton eventually coordinated with the Confederate War Department and Confederate general Kirby Smith, commanding the Department of the Trans-Mississippi to have the Arkansas Vicksburg parolee's rendezvous point established at Camden, Arkansas.

=== Return to Arkansas ===
After being exchanged, the unit returned to Arkansas and became Stirman's Arkansas Cavalry Battalion.

After re-organizing in Arkansas the unit was assigned to Fagan's Cavalry Division during the Camden Expedition.

Immediately following the Camden Expedition, the unit was reported near Fayetteville.

The unit participated in Price's Missouri Raid in the fall of 1864.

General E. Kirby Smith, C. S. Army, commanding the Army of the Trans-Mississippi Department, lists the unit on December 31, 1864, as belonging to the Second Arkansas Cavalry Brigade of Brigadier General Fagan's First Arkansas Cavalry Division.

On 31 December 1864, General Kirby Smith listed the unit as belonging to Colonel Slemmons Brigade of Fagan's Cavalry Division of Major General Sterling Price's Cavalry Corps. It appears that the unit was soon assigned to a Cavalry Brigade under Col Brooks. The unit operated in the Arkansas River Valley, interdicting the supply route between Little Rock and Fort Smith during the winter of 1864 to 1865. The unit participated in Confederate Attacks on the Union garrison at Dardanelle Arkansas on January 14 and 17, 1865.

No. 3. Order of Major General John B. Magruder, C. S. Army, commanding District of Arkansas, of operations January 14–17.

GENERAL ORDERS, HEADQUARTER DISTRICT OF ARKANSAS, No. 18 Washington, January 25, 1865.

The major-general commanding takes pleasure in announcing to the army that Colonel Brooks, commanding Brooks' brigade, composed of Brooks' men proper, Newton's regiment, and Stirman's battalion, after a long and difficult march to the Arkansas River, attacked a heavier force of the enemy near Dardanelle, drove him into his works, killing 8, wounding 19, and capturing 2; loss on our side, 1 killed and 15 wounded. Colonel Brooks, hearing of the approach of streamers from above, by a forced march, with 400 men, reached the proper point at sunrise on the 16th instant. Having placed a piece of artillery and his men in ambush, at 1 o'clock on the 17th, he permitted the leading boat to come well in range, when he opened upon her with his infantry and this piece. She was raked from stem to stern and soon surrendered. She proved to be the New Chippewa. The prisoners consist of 1 officer and 29 men of the Fiftieth Indiana and 40 negroes; also the captain, crew, and a large number of refugee families from Fort Smith. After removing everything valuable the boat was fired. The steamer Annie Jacobs next hove in sight. She was immediately attacked, and the fire was returned by the troops on board. She attempted to destroy our artillerists; our artillery, however, soon disabled her, and she grounded upon an island. Here many men [were] drowned in attempting to make their escape to the opposite bank. During the engagement with the Jacobs the Lotus came down. The troops on board were driven into the water and she to the north bank of the river, where most of them escaped, the iron axle of one piece of artillery having broken. Finding the boats too distant for an effective fire of musketry, Colonel Brooks returned to his camps, taking with him 82 prisoners and the refugee families captured. Federal casualties, 27 killed and wounded, besides those who were drowned; our own loss, 1 killed and 15 wounded. A large quantity of the enemy's store were Colonels Newton and Stirman and Lieutenant Lockhart are spoken of in high terms by Colonel Brooks in his report of their operations... The commanding general takes great pleasure in returning his thanks to both officers and men of the several commands for their gallant conduct on this occasion.

By command of Major General J. B. Magruder: EDMUND P. TURNER,

Assistant Adjutant-General

== Battles ==
- Battle of Pea Ridge
- Corinth Campaign
- Vicksburg Campaign

- Battle of Port Gibson
- Siege of Vicksburg

- Red River Campaign, Arkansas Mar-May, 1864.

- Battle of Poison Spring, Arkansas, April 18, 1864.
- Battle of Marks' Mills, Arkansas, April 25, 1864.
- Battle of Jenkins Ferry, Arkansas April 30, 1864.

- Price's Missouri Raid, Arkansas-Missouri-Kansas, September–October, 1864.

- Battle of Fort Davidson, Missouri, September 27, 1864.
- Fourth Battle of Boonville, Missouri, October 11, 1864.
- Battle of Glasgow, Missouri, October 15, 1864.
- Battle of Sedalia, Missouri, October 15, 1864.
- Second Battle of Lexington, Missouri, October 19, 1864.
- Battle of Little Blue River, Missouri, October 21, 1864.
- Second Battle of Independence, Missouri, October 21–22, 1864.
- Battle of Byram's Ford, Missouri, October 22–23, 1864.
- Battle of Westport, Missouri, October 23, 1864.
- Battle of Marais des Cygnes, Linn County, Kansas, October 25, 1864.
- Battle of Mine Creek, Missouri, October 25, 1864.
- Battle of Marmiton River, Missouri, October 25, 1864.
- Second Battle of Newtonia, Missouri, October 28, 1864.

== Surrender ==
The remnants of the battalion were officially surrendered with the Department of the Trans-Mississippi on May 26, 1865.

Stirman and his battalion were camped at or near Arkadelphia when the war ended. They went to Fort Smith, where they turned over their arms to the Federal garrison there. This information is credited to a letter from Marshall Henry to his brother at Fayetteville. "We marched finely to Fort Smith. The feds seemed glad to see us."

== See also ==
- List of Confederate units from Arkansas
- Confederate Units by State

== Bibliography ==
- Bates, J. C., & Lowe, R. G. (1999). A Texas Cavalry officer's Civil War: The diary and letters of James C. Bates. Baton Rouge: Louisiana State University Press.
- Carr, P. M. (1986). In fine spirits: The Civil War letters of Ras Stirman with historical comments. Fayetteville, AR: Washington County Historical Society.
- Cozzens, P. (1997). The darkest days of the war: The battles of Iuka & Corinth. Chapel Hill: University of North Carolina Press.
- DeBlack, Thomas A. With Fire and Sword: Arkansas, 1861–1874. Fayetteville: University of Arkansas Press, 2003.
- Moneyhon, Carl. "1865: A State of Perfect Anarchy." In Rugged and Sublime: The Civil War in Arkansas, edited by Mark K. Christ. Fayetteville: University of Arkansas Press, 1994.
- Prier, Jay "Under the Black Flag: The Real War in Washington County", Master's thesis University of Arkansas.
- Scott, Joe M., "Four Years Service in the Southern Army, Washington County Historical Society, Fayetteville, Arkansas, June 20, 1960.
- Lemke, Walter J., The War-Time Letter of Albert O McCollom, Confederate Soldier, Washington County Historical Society, Fayetteville, Arkansas, 1961
- The War of the Rebellion: A Compilation of the Official Records of the Union and Confederate Armies. Series 1, Vol. 48. Washington DC: Government Printing Office, 1890–1901, pp. 11–17
