= 3rd Texas Cavalry Regiment =

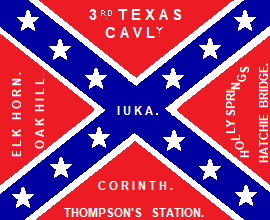
- Facsimile of the 3rd Texas Cavalry flag captured by Union troops at Lovejoy's Station in August 1864
- Active: 13 June 1861 – May 1865
- Country: Confederate States of America
- Allegiance: Confederate States of America, Texas
- Branch: Confederate States Army
- Type: Cavalry and Infantry
- Size: Regiment
- Nickname: South Kansas-Texas Mounted Volunteers
- Engagements: American Civil War; Battle of Wilson's Creek (1861); Battle of Chustenahlah (1861); Battle of Pea Ridge (1862); Siege of Corinth (1862); Battle of Iuka (1862); Battle of Corinth (1862); Holly Springs Raid (1862); Battle of Thompson's Station (1863); Battle of Yazoo City (1864); Atlanta campaign (1864); Battle of Nashville (1864)

Commanders
- Notable commanders: Col. Elkanah Greer; Col. H.P. Mabry

The 3rd Texas Cavalry Regiment or South Kansas-Texas Mounted Volunteers was a unit of mounted volunteers that fought in the Confederate States Army during the American Civil War. The regiment fought at Wilson's Creek and Chustenahlah in 1861, Pea Ridge, Corinth siege, Iuka, Second Corinth, and the Holly Springs Raid in 1862, Thompson's Station in 1863, and at Yazoo City, in the Atlanta campaign, and at Nashville in 1864. The regiment fought dismounted at Iuka and Second Corinth before being remounted for the rest of the war. The regiment surrendered to Federal forces in May 1865 and its remaining 207 men were paroled.

== Formation ==
The 3rd Texas Cavalry formed at Dallas and mustered into Confederate service on 13 June 1861. The original field officers were Colonel Elkanah Greer, Lieutenant Colonel Walter P. Lane, and Major George W. Chilton, while the Adjutant was Mathew Ector. The regiment counted 1,094 officers and enlisted men who were recruited from the following northeast Texas counties: Cass, Cherokee, Harrison, Hunt, Kaufman, Marion, Rusk, San Augustine, Shelby, Smith, Upshur, and Wood. Its soldiers also came from the towns of Dallas, Greenville, Henderson, Ladonia, and Marshall. The regiment was also known as the South Kansas-Texas Mounted Volunteers. Later, Robert H. Cumby and Hinchie P. Mabry would serve as colonel, Giles S. Boggess would be lieutenant colonel, and J. J. A. Barker and Absalom B. Stone would serve as major.

== History ==
=== 1861 ===
The 3rd Texas Cavalry left Dallas in July 1861, together with Good's Texas Battery which was also under Greer's command. By 1 August the column reached Fort Smith, Arkansas, where Good's Battery was left behind to refit, while the cavalry continued on to join Benjamin McCulloch's force. It was the only Texas regiment that fought at the Battle of Wilson's Creek on 10 August 1861. The Federal commander Nathaniel Lyon attacked the encampment of Sterling Price and McCulloch from the north while his subordinate Franz Sigel attacked from the south. Sigel's force surprised the troops of Greer, J. P. Major, and Thomas James Churchill and drove them from their camps. However, Sigel's men were quickly routed. Early in the battle, the DeRosey Carroll's 1st Arkansas Cavalry and Greer's troopers charged James Totten's Union battery but were repulsed. Later, the Texans and the 3rd Louisiana Infantry formed the right flank of the Confederate attack on the Union position on Oak Hill. Lyon was killed and the Federals soon retreated. However, one map shows Greer's position on the left flank.

Most of the tribes in Indian Territory joined the Confederacy, while other Native Americans chose to remain loyal to the Union. The pro-Union Indians with their leader Opothleyahola fled toward Kansas with their families and their livestock, with the 9th Texas Cavalry Regiment and pro-Confederate Indians under Douglas H. Cooper in hot pursuit. There were inconclusive skirmishes at Round Mountain on 19 November 1861 and Chusto-Talasah (Bird Creek) on 9 December. (Note: Monaghan named the 4th Texas, an early name for the 9th Texas.) The 3rd Texas Cavalry fought in the Battle of Chustenahlah on 26 December. After failing to stop Opothleyahola's band, Cooper asked for help and James M. McIntosh led 1,380 Texas horsemen to defeat the Union Indians at Chustenahlah. After the fighting was done, McIntosh immediately marched his Texans to Fort Smith, Arkansas. Confederate Indians led by Stand Watie arrived after the battle and launched a pursuit that killed 700 of Opothleyahola's fleeing band.

=== 1862 ===
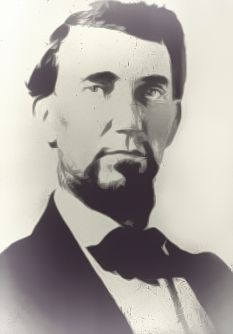
Elkanah Greer

At the Battle of Pea Ridge on 7–8 March 1862, the 3rd Texas Cavalry was assigned to McIntosh's Brigade of McCulloch's Division. As McIntosh advanced east along the Ford Road on the morning of 7 March, the 3rd Texas was in a column of fours on the brigade's right flank. Suddenly the cavalrymen came under fire from three Federal guns near a wood's edge to their right. As the guns killed ten cavalrymen and wounded others, McIntosh ordered a right face which put the 3rd Texas in the front line. At the last moment McCulloch pulled the 3rd Texas out of the formation to guard the guns of Good's Battery. So the regiment missed out on the grand charge that captured the guns and routed Cyrus Bussey's Federals. McCulloch deployed his division with the 3rd Texas Cavalry farthest to the east, where the men dismounted and climbed up Little Mountain. Soon afterward, McCulloch rode into the woods and was killed by a Union skirmisher. Foolishly, McCulloch's staff officers decided to keep the general's death a secret. Not long afterward, the second-in-command McIntosh was also killed and the leaderless regiments became inert. While these events occurred, the third-in-command Louis Hebert led half of his infantry brigade into the woods farther east. The breakdown of the division's command structure was complete. As late as 3:00 pm one of McCulloch's staff officers spoke with Colonel Greer but "evasively" failed to report McCulloch's death, despite the fact that Greer was the division's fourth-in-command. By 4:00 pm Hebert's attack was defeated and the 3rd Texas Cavalry withdrew from Little Mountain and joined the rest of its division. Soon after, Greer finally found that Hebert was missing (he was captured) and that he was the division's ranking officer. At that time, he ordered five infantry regiments, four cavalry units, and two batteries to join the other half of Earl Van Dorn's army in Cross Timbers Hollow. The other units of McCulloch's division had scattered. The regiment did not fight on 8 March. On 10 March, Price sent the 3rd Texas Cavalry to look for the retreating army's missing artillery. It was found near Huntsville, Arkansas and escorted to safety.

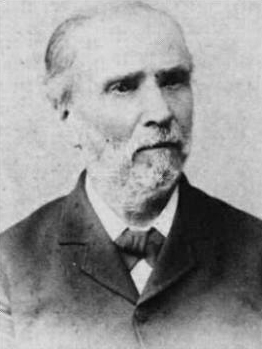
Louis Hebert

After Pea Ridge, Van Dorn transferred his 22,000-man army to Corinth, Mississippi. At the time, 3rd Texas Cavalry numbered 707 effectives, was assigned to Greer's brigade, and was commanded by Lane. The Corinth camps were unhealthy and 43 men from the 3rd Texas Cavalry died of sickness. During the 20 May 1862 reorganization, 200 more soldiers were discharged because they were too young, too old, or physically unfit. The regiment helped cover the 29–30 May evacuation after the Siege of Corinth ended. On 19 September 1862, the regiment suffered its worst losses of the war in the Battle of Iuka, with 22 killed, 74 wounded, and 48 captured. During the battle, the 3rd Texas Cavalry was assigned to Hebert's brigade in Lewis Henry Little's division. A few weeks earlier, the 3rd Texas Cavalry sent their horses to graze so they fought the battle on foot. Hebert ordered the regiment to form a skirmish line and advance into a ravine in front of the Union positions. As Colonel Hinchie P. Mabry led the 3rd Texas Cavalry forward, Union riflemen and artillery opened fire at a range of 150 yd (137 m). Sergeant W. P. Helm watched as a round shot beheaded his company commander, while canister shot chopped a lieutenant and a private in half. Soon Hebert's brigade attempted to seize the 11th Ohio Battery, which became the focus of the fighting. Part of the 3rd Texas Cavalry helped the 1st Texas Legion rout the 48th Indiana Infantry Regiment and reach the top of the ridge. Sam Barron saw four men killed near him while Sergeant Helm claimed that 27 of 42 men from his company were casualties. The 3rd Texas Cavalry lost some men to friendly fire when the 1st Texas Legion mistakenly shot at them. After a terrific struggle, the 3rd Texas Cavalry and other units captured the Ohio battery. Barron remarked of the Federal gunners, "the brave defenders standing nobly to their posts until they were nearly all shot down." Colonel Mabry was wounded in the ankle.

At the Second Battle of Corinth on 3–4 October 1862, the 3rd Texas Cavalry (dismounted) was in W. Bruce Colbert's brigade, Hebert's division, Sterling Price's corps. On 3 October, Colbert's brigade was in reserve behind Hebert's three frontline brigades during the opening 10:00 am attack. At 3:30 pm, Colbert's brigade still formed the reserve. On 4 October, Van Dorn expected Hebert's division to attack at dawn, as ordered. Instead, Hebert reported himself sick at headquarters and had to be replaced by Martin E. Green. In the confusion, Green's troops did not attack until 10:00 am. Green's two right-hand brigades broke through the Union defenses and seized Battery Powell, but sustained heavy losses. The two left-hand brigades, which included Colbert's, ran into stiffer opposition. The 3rd Texas Cavalry fought against some of the same Federal units that it fought at Iuka (48th Indiana and 11th Ohio Battery). After 45 minutes of fighting, Colbert's soldiers were repulsed with serious losses. The Union troops captured 132 men from Colbert's brigade. At Corinth, the 3rd Texas Cavalry lost 2 killed, 29 wounded, and 13 missing.

In December 1862, John C. Pemberton appointed Van Dorn the commander of three cavalry brigades and ordered him to wreck Ulysses S. Grant's supply depot at Holly Springs, Mississippi. Van Dorn started from Grenada, Mississippi with 3,500 cavalrymen and the Holly Springs Raid was a smashing success. On 20 December the Union garrison was caught napping and 1,500 men were captured and paroled. About $1,500,000 worth of supplies went up in smoke and compelled Grant to withdraw from northern Mississippi. The remounted 3rd Texas Cavalry participated in the raid. It was part of a new brigade formed on 23 October 1862. The brigade was led by John Wilkins Whitfield and consisted of the 3rd Texas, 6th Texas, 9th Texas, and 27th Texas Cavalry Regiments.

=== 1863–1865 ===
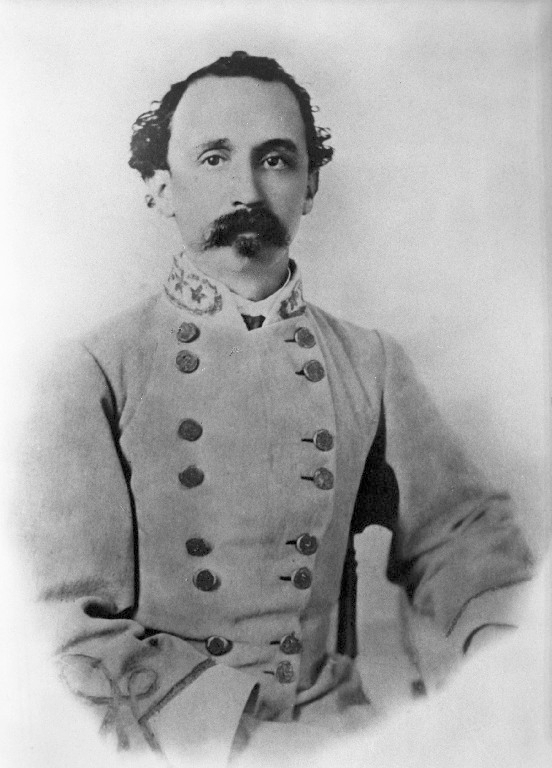
L. Sullivan "Sul" Ross

The 3rd Texas Cavalry fought at the Battle of Thompson's Station on 5 March 1863. On 4 March, a Federal infantry brigade led by John Coburn marched south from Franklin, Tennessee on a reconnaissance. It quickly ran into elements of William Hicks Jackson's Confederate cavalry division. Coburn warned headquarters that he was walking into a trap, but he forged ahead. The next morning he approached Thompson's Station and drove Confederates from hills just north of town. At this time, the Union artillery and cavalry units suddenly left the field. Van Dorn ordered Jackson's troopers to dismount and attack Coburn's soldiers frontally. Meanwhile, Nathan Bedford Forrest's division rode around the Union left flank, captured Coburn's wagon train, and blocked the Union escape route. The fighting went on for five hours. The Federals surrendered when they ran out of ammunition. Confederate casualties numbered 357 while the Union troops lost 1,600 killed, wounded, and captured.

Later, Whitfield's brigade was sent to Mississippi to take part in futile operations to relieve the Siege of Vicksburg. After Vicksburg fell, the 3rd Texas Cavalry defended Mississippi against Federal incursions. On 4 June 1863, a report by W. H. Jackson stated that Whitfield's cavalry brigade counted 123 officers and 1,354 men present for duty in the 3rd, 6th, 9th, and 27th Texas. The 3rd Texas was commanded by Lieutenant Colonel Boggess. On 29 October 1863, Colonel Mabry took temporary leadership of the brigade when Whitfield became too ill to continue. On 16 December Lawrence Sullivan "Sul" Ross assumed permanent command of the brigade. For the first few months of 1864, the units of Ross's brigade engaged in operations along the Yazoo River, including fighting in the Battle of Yazoo City on 5 March. In May 1864, Ross's brigade was transferred to Georgia.

During the Atlanta campaign, Ross's brigade was part of W. H. Jackson's cavalry division and Lieutenant Colonel Boggess led the 3rd Texas Cavalry. Aside from day to day skirmishes, the regiment fought at the battles of New Hope Church, Lovejoy's Station, and Jonesborough. The regiment suffered heavy casualties during the campaign and the Federals captured their battle flag at Lovejoy's Station in August 1864. On 18 August 1864, 4,700 Union cavalry under Hugh Judson Kilpatrick set out on a raid to wreck the Macon and Western Railroad. Though Ross' brigade only counted 400 men, it significantly slowed down the Federal horsemen. The raiders drove Ross' troopers out of Jonesborough but heavy rains began, preventing the Union cavalry from burning the railroad ties. On 20 August, Kilpatrick marched his cavalry to Lovejoy's Station where they were ambushed by Confederate infantry and cavalry and attacked from the rear by Ross' brigade. Kilpatrick ordered Robert H. G. Minty's brigade to break out to the rear. In the ensuing saber charge, the Union cavalry routed Ross' outnumbered troopers and found the battle flag in a captured ambulance. Kilpatrick's division escaped to Union lines with the loss of 237 casualties.

The 3rd Texas Cavalry Regiment fought in the subsequent Franklin–Nashville Campaign in late 1864. After the Confederate defeat in the Battle of Nashville on 15–16 December, the 3rd Texas Cavalry was part of the rear guard led by Forrest. The regiment returned to Mississippi where it spent most of its time. About half of the soldiers were furloughed and many deserted. The 207 survivors of the regiment surrendered at Citronelle, Alabama to Edward Canby's Union army. The official date of Ross's brigade's surrender was 4 May 1865. Stephen D. Lee called the Texans the "most reliable" troops under his command. The soldiers of Ross's brigade were also described as "rollicking, rascally, brave". In 1875 the veterans formed the Ross Brigade Association.

== See also ==
- List of Texas Civil War Confederate units

== Flags ==
The regiment is known to have carried 5 flags during the war. The first flag flown by the regiment was made 3 years before the war for a local militia in city of Tyler. The flag was a swallowtail design and had 18 stripes of red and white. In the top corner is a blue square with a golden ring containing a white cross in it. An 8-pointed star sits in the middle of the cross with the text "TYLER GRUARDS," and a golden dot. Below it was a pink square with a white 5-pointed star in the center, above and below the star was the text, "Texas, Forever." The whole thing measured 3 1/2 feet by 7 1/2 feet. When the regiment was organizing the flag was believed to be used during early 1861. They soon stop using it because of its similarity's to the American flag.

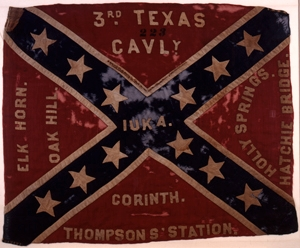
Third flag carried by the regiment from early 1864

The second flag was based off the Stars and Bars, it measured 31 in by 72 inches with a star pattern featuring 11 stars in a circle with 1 star in the middle of it. The banner was carried though the battles of Wilson's Creek, Pea Ridge, and Corinth. In 1862 the flag was sent back to Texas.

The third flag was the Bonnie blue flag, a blue field with a single white upside down star. Years later the flag was later put on exhibit during the 1936 Texas Centennial Exposition. In 2007, it sold at an auction for $47,800.

The fourth flag was made in early 1864. The flag was based on the flag of the Army of Northern Virginia bearing 12 stars and the name of regiment with the battles it took part in on its field.

The fifth flag was captured by union forces in July of 1864. The banner was described as: "...a black flag with a skeleton figured upon it, together with a death's head and cross bones..." Its design caused controversy suggesting no quarter angering many of the northern soldiers, soon federals started executing captured troops from the 3rd.

== Notes ==
Footnotes

Citations
