= Robert C. Murphy (colonel) =

American colonel (c.1827–1888)

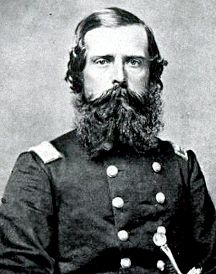
- Born: c. 1827; Chillicothe, Ohio, U.S.
- Died: 1888 (aged 61); Washington, D.C., U.S.
- Burial place: Congressional Cemetery, Washington, D.C., U.S.
- Military career
- Allegiance: United States (Union)
- Branch: Union Army
- Service years: 1861 — 1862
- Rank: Colonel
- Commands: 8th Wisconsin Infantry Regiment
- Conflicts: American Civil War; Iuka and Corinth Operations; Battle of Iuka; Vicksburg campaign; Holly Springs Raid

Robert Creighton Murphy (c. 1827-1888) was an American colonel who served the Union during the American Civil War who primarily operated during the Vicksburg campaign and commanded the 8th Wisconsin.

== Biography ==
=== Early years ===
Murphy was born in Chillicothe, Ohio, in 1827. He was the first government-salaried U.S. Consul at Shanghai, China, from 1853 until June 1857. In 1859, Murphy moved to Saint Croix Falls, Wisconsin.

=== American Civil War ===
Murphy entered military service around 1861 when the 8th Wisconsin Infantry Regiment was created around September 13, but wouldn't see any major operations until an entire year later at the Battle of Iuka. During the battle, Murphy was stationed to guard a small supply depot, but on September 14, he applied a scorched earth policy at the depot, and the pursuing Confederates doused the fire in time to capture a large amount of supplies, and Murphy was captured himself in his pajamas. Afterwards, William Rosecrans relieved Murphy, but then ordered him to be court-martialed for his failure to effectively being able to destroy the supplies, but Murphy was acquitted of all charges.

Later in the same year, Murphy was put in charge of another supply depot stationed at Holly Springs, Mississippi, when Confederate general Earl Van Dorn led a raid on the Union forces stationed there and defeated them, which took a heavy toll on Grant's Vicksburg campaign, and Murphy was dismissed from the army without a court-martial.

Murphy wrote to Abraham Lincoln to ask for a court-martial or hearing, but Adjudant-General Joseph Holt concluded that his dismissal was reasonable. Murphy attempted to get a hearing for the next fifteen years but ultimately failed. Murphy died in 1888 in Washington, D.C. and was buried at the Congressional Cemetery.
