= 1st Arkansas Field Battery =

- Active: 1861–1865
- Disbanded: May 26, 1865
- Country: Confederate States of America
- Allegiance: CSA
- Branch: Artillery
- Size: Artillery Battery
- Nickname: John D. Adams Artillery
- Engagements: American Civil War: Battle of Pea Ridge, Iuka and Corinth Campaign; Second Battle of Corinth, Battle of Hatchie's Bridge, Operations Against Vicksburg; Battle of Coffeeville, Action, Chickasaw Bluff, Assault, Chickasaw Bluff, Vicksburg Campaign; Passage of Vicksburg and Warrenton Batteries, Siege of Vicksburg, Jackson Expedition; Siege, Jackson, Assault, Jackson,

Commanders
- 1861–1862: Captain James J. Gaines
- 1862–1865: Captain Francis McAnally

The 1st Arkansas Field Battery (1861–1865) was a Confederate Army artillery battery during the American Civil War. It was also known as the John D. Adams Artillery, Adams Artillery, Gaines' Battery or McNally's Battery. The battery made the crossing of the Mississippi River in April 1862 with Major General Earl Van Dorn's Army of the West. After being surrendered at the conclusion of the Vicksburg Campaign, the battery was reorganized in the Department of the Trans-Mississippi and served there for the remainder of the war.

== Organization ==
The battery was organized as the "John D. Adams Artillery," and mustered into state service in April, 1861. It was later re-enlisted for Confederate service, effective December 1, 1861. The unit was named in honor of an Arkansas Veteran of the Mexican–American War. John D. Adams had served as a private in Colonel Yell's 1st Regiment of Arkansas Mounted Gunmen and suffered a wound at the Battle of Buena Vista. Following the war he became a successful merchant, planter and steamboat operation in Little Rock. John D. Adams did not serve with the battery that bore his name. He did later obtain a commission as a Major in the Quartermaster Department under General Thomas C. Hindman. The battery officers were: Captain James J. Gaines; Captain Francis McNally; Lieutenant Frank A. Moore; Lieutenant David W. Hudgens, Second Lieutenant John P. Murphy. Unfortunately, there are no known surviving muster rolls of the Adams Artillery.

== Service ==
Assigned to support Louis Hébert's brigade of Benjamin McCulloch's division in northwest Arkansas in December, 1861, the unit was stationed at the Leetown portion of the Battle of Pea Ridge on March 7–8, 1862. The battery was armed with two 12-pounder rifled guns and two M1841 12-pounder howitzers. The battery participated in the retreat to camp near Van Buren, Arkansas after Pea Ridge, and then moved with the Army of the West to Corinth, Mississippi in April, 1862.

The battery reorganized at Corinth on May 16, 1862, as a result of the Confederate Conscription Act, and assigned to support of John Selden Roane's (later Charles W. Phifer's) brigade of Dabney H. Maury's division, Army of the West, serving in northeast Mississippi. Capt. Francis M. McNally assumed command, and it was thereafter known as McNally's Arkansas Battery.

The battery fought at the Second Battle of Corinth on October 3–4, 1862, and at the Battle of Hatchie's Bridge on October 7. The unit served as an unattached battery of Maury's (later John Horace Forney's) division in north central Mississippi from November, 1862, to April 1863, fighting in an engagement at Oakland, Mississippi, on December 3.

The battery, commanded by Capt. Francis McNally, was assigned to support of Brig. Gen. Francis A. Shoup’s Brigade, of Maj. Gen. Martin Luther Smith’s Division, Lt. Gen. John C. Pemberton’s Army of Vicksburg, where it served during the Vicksburg campaign and in the defenses of Vicksburg during the siege. The battery's position with in the Vicksburg National military Park is marked by an iron tablet located on Confederate Avenue north of the Stockade Redan (Tour Stop #10). The battery was surrendered with the Vicksburg garrison on July 4, 1863, and was paroled there later the same month.

When the battery was captured at Vicksburg, a section of two 3-inch brass rifle guns under First Lieut. Frank A. Moore, numbering about twenty-five officers and men, was on detached service outside the Vicksburg lines and thus escaped capture. This surviving section was attached to Brig. Gen. Matthew D. Ector's Brigade, of Maj. Gen. William H.T. Walker's Division, Gen. Joseph E. Johnston's Army of Relief, Department of the West. When McNally's Battery was subsequently reformed back in Arkansas, Moore's section was stranded east of the Mississippi. It was subsequently attached to King's 2nd Missouri Battery and served east of the Mississippi to the end of the war. This section served with Cosby's brigade, Jackson's division, Lee's cavalry corps.

General Ulysses S. Grant initially demanded the conditional surrender of the Vicksburg garrison, but faced with the necessity of feeding 30,000 starving Confederates and having the idea that these soldiers might do more harm to the Confederate cause by being released to return home rather than being exchanged as whole units, he relented and allowed for the immediate parole of the unit. According to the Confederate War Department, the Union leader encouraged the surrendered Confederates to simply return home, rather than being officially paroled and exchanged. The able bodied Confederate soldiers who were released on parole walked out of Vicksburg (they were not allowed to proceed in any military formations) on July 11, 1863. Paroling of these able bodied men was completed in their respective camps inside Vicksburg prior to July 11. Those who were wounded or sick in the various hospitals in Vicksburg were paroled, and were released, as soon as they could leave on their own. July 15/16 is the most common date of these Vicksburg hospital paroles. Some of the most seriously wounded and sick were sent by steamship down the Mississippi River and over to Mobile, Alabama, where they were delivered on parole to Confederate authorities.

Confederate commanders designated Enterprise, Mississippi as the rendezvous point (parole camp) for the Vicksburg parolees to report to after they got clear of the last Federal control point at Big Black Bridge. Most of the Arkansas units, including many survivors of McNally's Battery, appear to have bypassed the established parole camps, and possibly with the support, or at least by the compliancy, of their Union captors, simply crossed the river and returned home. Because so many of the Vicksburg parolees, especially from Arkansas, simply went home, Major General Pemberton requested Confederate President Davis grant the men a thirty- to sixty-day furlough. The furloughs were not strictly adhered to so long as the soldier eventually showed up at a parole camp to be declared exchanged and returned to duty. Those who went directly home were treated as if they had been home on furlough if they eventually reported into one of these two parole centers. The exchange declaration reports issued by Colonel Robert Ould in Richmond for various units in the Vicksburg and Port Hudson surrenders began in September 1863 based upon men who actually reported to one of the two parole camps. Pemberton eventually coordinated with the Confederate War Department and Confederate General Kirby Smith, commanding the Department of the Trans-Mississippi, to have the Arkansas Vicksburg parolee's rendezvous point established at Camden, Arkansas. The battery was reorganized in Arkansas using four 6-pounder smoothbores.

In General E. Kirby Smith's September 30, 1864, report on the Organization of the Army of the Trans-Mississippi Department, McNally's Battery is listed as belonging to the 5th Mounted Artillery Battalion along with West's and Marshall's Arkansas Batteries. The battery supported Churchill's First Arkansas Division, and served with this division until the end of the war.

On November 19, 1864, General E. Kirby Smith, commanding the Confederate Trans-Mississippi Department, issued Special Orders No. 290, re-organizing the artillery of the department and for the first time providing numerical designations to the batteries and battalions. In this reorganization, the Adams Artillery, armed with 4 guns, and commanded by Capt. Francis M. McNally was redesignated as the 1st Arkansas Field Battery and assigned to the 5th Artillery Battalion, commanded by Maj. William Durbin Blocher.

On December 31, 1864, General E. Kirby Smith listed the battery as belonging to Blocher's Artillery Battalion of Acting Major General Churchill's First Infantry Division of Major General John B. Magruder's Second Army Corps, Army of the Trans-Mississippi.

One of the last reports of the unit comes from the report of Union Scout C. S. Bell, who was attempting to pass through southern Arkansas when he was recognized and imprisoned. He won release, only to be conscripted into Confederate Service and assigned to McNally's Battery. Bell was sent, in leg irons, to join McNally's Battery on April 19, 1865, at Rocky Mountain, La., 30 mi (48 km) northeast of Shreveport. A few days after reaching is new command, he witnessed the reading of an order from General Kirby Smith dated the 23 April 1865 in which Smith recounted the disasters to Lee's army and bade his army to be hopeful; to not abandon their colors; that the eyes of the world were upon them; that their resources were inexhaustible, and that on them depended the fate of the Confederacy.

The battery was involved in the following engagements:

- Battle of Pea Ridge, Arkansas, March 6–8, 1862.

Iuka and Corinth Campaign

- Second Battle of Corinth, Mississippi, October 3–4, 1862
- Battle of Hatchie's Bridge, Mississippi, October 7, 1862

Operations Against Vicksburg

- Battle of Coffeeville, Mississippi, December 5, 1862
- Action, Chickasaw Bluff, Sherman's Operations against Vicksburg, Mississippi Dec. 27 – 28, 1862
- Assault, Chickasaw Bluff, Mississippi, Dec. 29, 1862

Vicksburg Campaign

- Passage of Vicksburg and Warrenton Batteries, Mississippi, April 22, 1863
- Siege of Vicksburg, Mississippi, May–July 1863.

Jackson Expedition (Lieutenant Moore's section)

- Siege, Jackson, Mississippi (Section), July 10 – 16, 1863
- Assault, Jackson, Mississippi (Section), July 12, 1863

== Surrender ==
When the Trans-Mississippi Army surrendered in May 1865, McNally's Battery, along with most other units, simply disbanded and never formally surrendered. The battery was officially surrendered by General E. Kirby Smith with the Trans-Mississippi Department on May 26, 1865. The date of the military convention between Confederate General Edmund Kirby Smith and Union General Edward Canby for the surrender of the troops and public property in the Trans-Mississippi Department was May 26, 1865, however, it took a while for parole commissioners to be appointed and for public property to be accounted for. As a result, a final report of field artillery which was part of the accounting process, was not completed until June 1, 1865. The final report lists McNally's Battery with four, six pounder smooth bore cannon being turned in at Shreveport, Louisiana. Captain McNally was paroled at Shreveport, Louisiana, on June 10, 1865.

== See also ==
- List of Confederate units from Arkansas
- Confederate Units by State
