= Tishomingo Hotel =

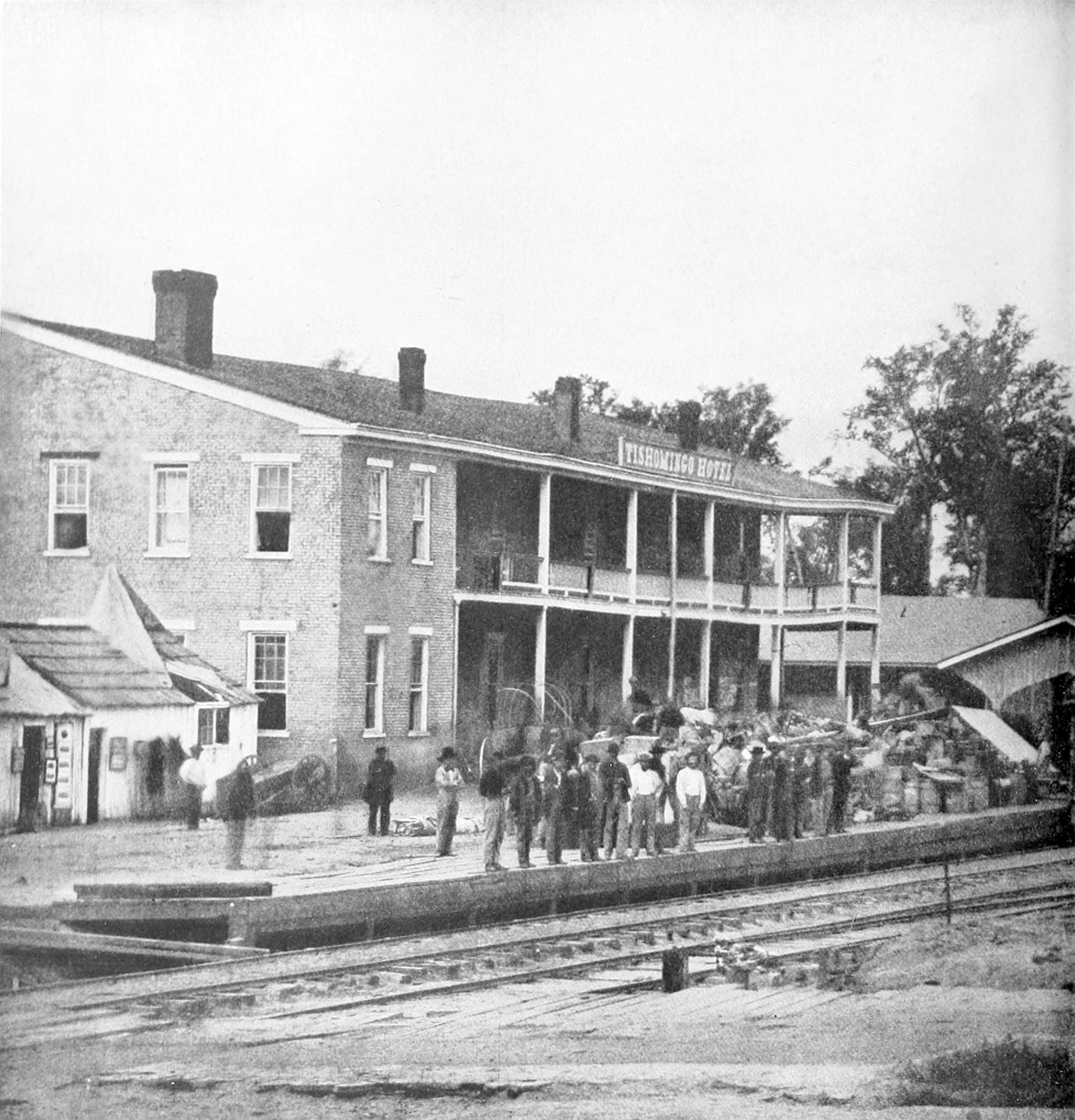
- Tishomingo Hotel in 1862

- Location within Mississippi Location within the United States

General information
- Location: Corinth, Mississippi, USA
- Coordinates: 34°56′03″N 88°31′17″W
- Completed: 1859
- Demolished: January 19, 1865

Technical details
- Structural system: Brick

Design and construction
- Architect: Martin Siegrist
- Structural engineer: Martin Siegrist

Tishomingo Hotel in Corinth, Mississippi was a hotel built in 1859, used as a military hospital during the American Civil War. It was burned down by Confederate forces in 1865.

The two-story hotel was built in 1859 by Swiss architect Martin Siegrist. The hotel had a prime location, close to the railroad depot. In the backyard stood the hotel kitchen in a separate building, as well as a number of outbuildings.

During the war it became a military hospital of both contending armies. First as a Confederate hospital after the Battle of Shiloh in April 1862, and then as a Union hospital after Battle of Corinth in October the same year. It was later used as a shelter for escaped slaves.

In 1865 Corinth briefly fell into Confederate hands again, and the hotel was used as a supply magazine. When leaving town, the Confederate army under John B. Hood burned the hotel, in order to prevent the Union army from taking control over the supplies.
