= Elkanah Greer =

Confederate Army general

Elkanah B. Greer
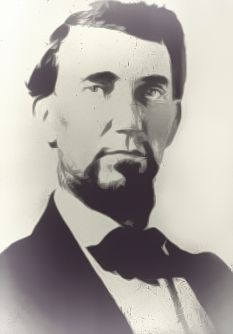
- Born: October 11, 1825; Paris, Tennessee, US
- Died: March 25, 1877 (aged 51); DeValls Bluff, Arkansas, US
- Military career
- Allegiance: United States of America; Confederate States of America
- Branch: United States Army; Confederate States Army
- Service years: 1861–1865
- Rank: Private (USA); Brigadier General (CSA)
- Commands: Greer's Brigade
- Conflicts: Mexican–American War: Battle of Monterrey; Battle of Buena Vista; American Civil War: Battle of Wilson's Creek; Battle of Pea Ridge
- Other work: planter, merchant, lawyer

Elkanah Brackin (or Bracken) Greer (October 11, 1825 – March 25, 1877) was an antebellum planter, merchant, and then a general in the Confederate States Army during the American Civil War. Born in Tennessee, Greer moved to Mississippi and later served in the Mississippi Rifles in the United States Army during the Mexican–American War. In 1848, he moved to Marshall, Texas, where he was a lawyer, planter, and merchant. In 1859, Greer became the commander of the Knights of the Golden Circle, a pro-slavery organization. After the outbreak of the Civil War in 1861, Greer raised what became the 3rd Texas Cavalry Regiment and received a commission as its colonel. Greer fought at the Battle of Wilson's Creek in August 1861, the Battle of Chustenahlah in December 1861, and the Battle of Pea Ridge in March 1862, receiving an arm wound in the last. Greer resigned his commission in June 1862, but was commissioned as a brigadier general in October. Assigned to lead the conscription bureau of the Trans-Mississippi Department in June 1863, Greer continued in that role until relieved in March 1865. Resigning his Confederate commission in May 1865, Greer returned to civilian life and died at DeValls Bluff, Arkansas in 1877.

== Biography ==
=== Prewar life ===
Elkanah Brackin (or Bracken) Greer was born on October 11, 1825, in Paris, Tennessee, to James and Rachel Greer. (Note: The Handbook of Texas Online provides a birth date of October 13.) Greer later relocated to Mississippi with his family. During the Mexican–American War, he served in Colonel Jefferson Davis's Mississippi Rifles, with the rank of private. He saw action at the Battle of Monterrey and the Battle of Buena Vista. Greer held the rank of Major General in the Mississippi state militia for a time after the war, before moving to Marshall, Texas, in 1848; he returned to Tennessee in 1851 to marry Anna Holcombe, with whom he fathered four children. Anna was sister to Lucy Holcombe.

The stay in Tennessee did not last long. Greer was part of a law firm in Marshall and was the superintendent of a railroad; Warner writes that he "established himself as a planter and merchant" there. Politically, Greer was a Democrat who supported states' rights, as well as the institution of and expansion of slavery. A member of the Knights of the Golden Circle, Greer became the organization's grand commander in 1859. The Knights of the Golden Circle was an organization that sought to expand slavery as it was practiced in the United States into a wider geographic area, including Mexico, Cuba, and Central America. The organization raised military units in furtherance of its goals, with Greer organizing a cavalry regiment in 1860, the services of which were declined by the Governor of Texas, Sam Houston; the organization sought to invade Mexico. Greer was a delegate to the Charleston Democratic National Convention in 1860; he was one of the delegates who left the convention in opposition to Stephen Douglas. Greer supported the candidacy of John C. Breckinridge after the split in the Democratic party. After the election of Abraham Lincoln as president of the United States in 1860, Greer supported Texas secession.

=== American Civil War ===
After the secession of Texas, Greer journeyed to the capital of the Provisional Confederate Government at Montgomery, Alabama, where he received a commission as a colonel. In May and June 1861, Greer raised what became the 3rd Texas Cavalry Regiment for service in the Confederate States Army in the American Civil War. Because Greer intended the unit to establish Confederate control over the state of Kansas, the regiment was also known as the South Kansas–Texas Cavalry. In July, Greer's regiment traveled to Fort Smith, Arkansas, where it was placed under the command of Benjamin McCulloch. The process by which this occurred resulted in complaints from the Texas state authorities, who felt that the transfer of the regiment from Texas did not follow the proper procedure. Greer's first combat experience in the Civil War was in August at the Battle of Wilson's Creek in Missouri, where he served under Ben McCulloch. In December, Greer's regiment was present at the Battle of Chustenahlah, which was fought in the Indian Territory, but Greer himself was on leave visiting his family at that time. Having been assigned to James M. McIntosh's cavalry brigade, Greer saw action at the Battle of Pea Ridge in Arkansas in March 1862. Greer temporarily led a sizable portion of the Confederate force at Pea Ridge after the deaths of McCulloch and McIntosh and the capture of Louis Hébert, ordering the withdrawal of disorganized Confederate troops from part of the field on the first day of the battle. Greer's portion of the army marched overnight to rejoin the rest of the Confederate force. He suffered an arm wound during the battle, although it was not significant and he did not mention it in his post-battle report.

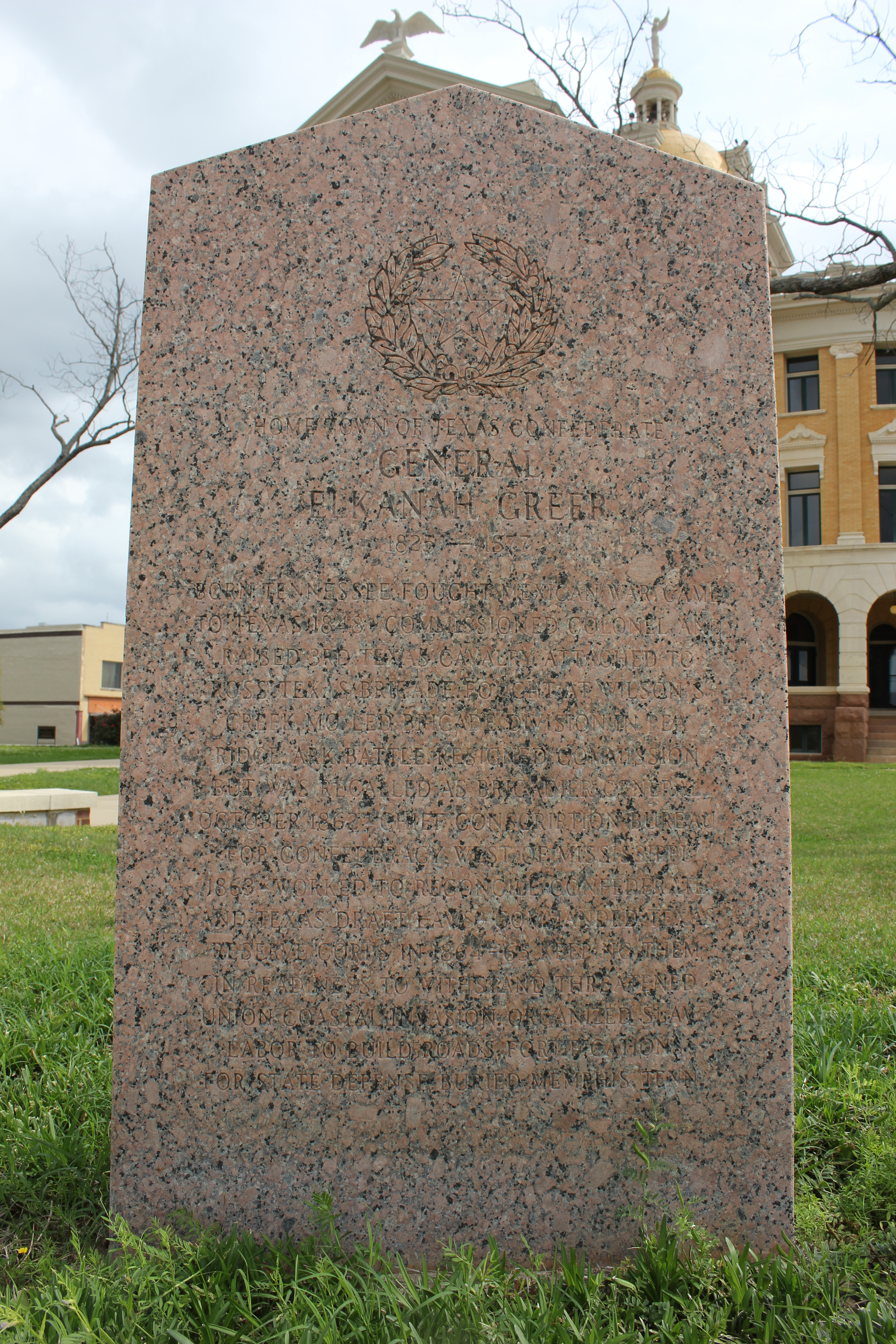
Elkanah Greer Confederate historical marker in Marshall, Texas

After the battle, Greer's regiment was dismounted and transferred across the Mississippi River. He commanded a brigade from March 13 to June 1, on which date he resigned his commission. The 3rd Texas Cavalry underwent a reorganization in April and May 1863 due to changes in Confederate law, which allowed soldiers who were not subject to conscription due to their age to be discharged; a number of officers resigned at this time as well. Greer's resignation may have been due to dissatisfaction with his chances for promotion and Van Dorn's report on the fighting at Pea Ridge. Greer received a new commission as a brigadier general on October 8. In early 1863, E. Kirby Smith reorganized the administrative structure of the Confederate Trans-Mississippi Department; Greer was appointed the departmental chief of conscription, having been ordered to the district in May 1863. Greer began his tenure as a conscription officer the following month, being stationed out of Marshall. Warner notes that Greer spent much of his time attempting to reconcile contradictory Confederate and Texas state laws; he felt that the Texas civil authorities were exempting too many men from military service. Another point of contention regarded the eligibility for conscription into Confederate service of Texas state militiamen serving on the frontier.

Greer commanded Confederate reservists in Texas, and was prepared for field service in 1864 to defend Marshall and Shreveport, Louisiana, although the two Union campaigns threatening the department at that time (the Red River campaign and the Camden Expedition) did not venture far enough into Confederate territory for Greer to become directly involved. As part of these preparations, Greer intended to replace able-bodied government employees (including quartermaster's clerks) who had deferments from conscriptions with individuals who were not eligible for military service. He also supervised the requisition of slave labor to work on Confederate government projects. Greer also was tasked with Confederate frontier defense duties in Texas, which led to disagreements with the Confederate civilian authorities. He also mustered reservists for the support of Price's Missouri Expedition in late 1864. At one point Greer was ordered to deploy Texas militiamen to Fulton, Arkansas, but the movement never occurred.

Francis T. Nicholls was assigned by the Confederate central government to take Greer's place as conscription chief in December 1864, but this change was rejected by Smith on the grounds of Greer's accomplishments while in the role. Either through Confederate government insistence on the appointment of Nicholls in December 1864, or on March 27, 1865, Greer was relieved from his role with the conscription bureau, and he then commanded the Texas Reserve Corps, replacing Jerome B. Robertson. He resigned from the Confederate military in May 1865, and returned to Marshall and civilian life. While visiting his sister in DeValls Bluff, Arkansas, Greer died on March 25, 1877. The medical historian Jack D. Welsh lists Greer's cause of death as "phthisis pulmonary". He is buried in Elmwood Cemetery in Memphis, Tennessee, next to his parents.

== See also ==
- List of American Civil War generals (Confederate)

== Sources ==
- Bailey, Anne J. (1991). "Elkanah Brackin Greer". In Davis, William C. (ed.). The Confederate General. Vol. 3. Harrisburg, Pennsylvania: National Historical Society. pp. 34–35. ISBN 9780918678652.
- Eicher, John H.; Eicher, David J. (2001). Civil War High Commands. Stanford, California: Stanford University Press. ISBN 978-0-8047-3641-1.
- Geise, William Royston (2022). Forsyth, Michael J. (ed.). The Confederate Military Forces in the Trans-Mississippi West, 1861–1865: A Study in Command. El Dorado Springs, California: Savas Beatie. ISBN 978-1-61121-621-9.
- Kerby, Robert L. (1972). Kirby Smith's Confederacy: The Trans-Mississippi South, 1863–1865 (University of Alabama paperback ed.). Tuscaloosa, Alabama: University of Alabama Press. ISBN 978-0-8173-0546-8.
- Lewis, Elizabeth Wittenmyer (2002). Queen of the Confederacy: The Innocent Deceits of Lucy Holcombe Pickens. Denton, Texas: University of North Texas Press. ISBN 1-57441-146-2.
- Shea, William L.; Hess, Earl J. (1992). Pea Ridge: Civil War Campaign in the West. Chapel Hill, North Carolina: University of North Carolina Press. ISBN 0-8078-4669-4.
- Warner, Ezra J. (2006) [1959]. Generals in Gray: Lives of the Confederate Commanders (Louisiana Paperback ed.). Baton Rouge, Louisiana: Louisiana State University Press. ISBN 978-0-8071-3150-3..
- Welsh, Jack D. (1995). Medical Histories of Confederate Generals. Kent, Ohio: Kent State University Press. ISBN 0-8733-8505-5.
- Wooster, Ralph A. (2000). Lone Star Generals in Gray. Austin, Texas: Eakin Press. ISBN 1571683259.
