= Charles W. Phifer =

Confederate States Army officer

Charles Wesley Phifer
- Born: January 1833; Tennessee
- Died: December 25, 1896 (aged 63); Savannah, Georgia
- Burial place: Laurel Grove Cemetery, Savannah
- Military career
- Allegiance: United States of America; Confederate States of America
- Branch: United States Army; Confederate States Army
- Service years: 1855–1861; 1861–1865
- Rank: 1st Lieutenant (USA); Major (CSA); Brigadier General (acting)
- Unit: 2nd U.S. Cavalry Regiment
- Commands: 6th Arkansas Cavalry Battalion; Phifer's Cavalry Brigade
- Conflicts: American Indian Wars; American Civil War: Second Battle of Corinth; Siege of Vicksburg
- Other work: Teacher, engineer

Charles Wesley Phifer (January 1833 – December 25, 1896) was a Confederate States Army officer during the American Civil War who was unofficially appointed brigadier general.

== Early life ==
Phifer, occasionally also spelled Pfifer, was born in Tennessee, probably Bedford County, in 1833. His parents, John and Ann (Phifer) Phifer, were both descended from an old North Carolina family of German (allegedly noble Austrian) descent. The father, a planter, moved to Coffeeville, Yalobusha County, Mississippi when Phifer was young. He attended the University of Mississippi and the University of North Carolina, graduating from the latter in 1854 with honors. Phifer received a direct appointment to the U.S. army in 1855. He spent the next six years a lieutenant in the 2nd Cavalry Regiment, fighting Indians on the Texas frontier.

== Military career ==
At the outbreak of the civil war, Phifer resigned his army commission and was commissioned a lieutenant in the Confederate regular army. He was a mustering officer in Louisiana in early 1861. Later in 1861, he became major and commanding officer of the 6th Arkansas Cavalry Battalion, which he led in various skirmishes in Kentucky the winter of 1861–62. After this, he did a brief stint on the staff of Major General Earl Van Dorn, his old army (2nd Cavalry) comrade. On May 25, 1862, Van Dorn assigned Phifer to duty as an acting brigadier general. He led a brigade of dismounted Texas Cavalry (later Ross' Texas Cavalry Brigade) at the Second Battle of Corinth in October 1862. Phifer valiantly led the brigade in a doomed charge on the Union army entrenchments. However, he soon reported "ill" (the Texans thought he was drunk) and missed the Battle of Hatchie Bridge. Contemporary reports suggest that he was an alcoholic, "highly educated" and genial when sober, but quarrelsome when drunk. On October 16, 1862, Phifer was relieved of command and acting rank. He again served as major and became assistant adjutant general to another old army friend, Col. Alexander W. Reynolds. Phifer was captured at the Siege of Vicksburg, was paroled and afterward resumed service on Reynolds's staff. In 1864 he apparently left active duty and later was listed as absent without leave.

== Later life ==
After the war, Phifer returned to Texas, living in Galveston and Austin. He married Lutie A. Marshall (1848–1917). He taught school and worked as a civil engineer. In the 1880s, he worked for Interior Department as superintendent of the Wichita tribe's Indian school (his wife taught there) but was dismissed after yet another drinking incident. Around 1890, he relocated to Savannah, Georgia, working as a part-time book canvasser. On December 25, 1896, while intoxicated, he accidentally fell down the steps of the cellar of Abrams' Savannah saloon and broke his neck. He's buried in Savannah's Laurel Grove Cemetery.

== See also ==
- List of American Civil War generals (Acting Confederate)
