= 1st Cherokee Mounted Rifles =

Regiment of the Confederate States Army

- National Color of the 1st Cherokee Mounted Rifles
- Active: 1861–1865
- Disbanded: June 23, 1865
- Country: Confederate States
- Allegiance: Cherokee Nation
- Branch: Army
- Type: Mounted Rifles
- Size: Regiment
- Part of: 1st Indian Brigade
- Nickname: "Cherokee Braves"
- Battles: American Civil War; Battle of Chusto-Talasah; Battle of Pea Ridge; First Battle of Cabin Creek; Battle of Elk Creek; Battle of Mazzard Prairie; Second Battle of Cabin Creek

Commanders
- Commanding officers: Col. John Drew (1861–62); Col. Stand Watie (1862–64); Col. Robert C. Parks (1864–65)

The 1st Cherokee Mounted Rifles (also known as the 1st Arkansas Cherokee Mounted Rifles and the "Cherokee Braves") was a cavalry formation of the Confederate States Army in the Trans-Mississippi Theater of the American Civil War.

== Formation ==
After Cherokee Principal Chief John Ross signed a treaty of alliance with the Confederate States in October 1861, he and the Cherokee Council authorized the formation of the 1st Cherokee Mounted Riflemen, to be commanded by Colonel John Drew. Most of the riflemen of the newly formed regiment were ideologically uncommitted to the goals of the Confederacy, but were loyal to Ross. (Note: Two of Drew's subordinate officers were Thomas Pegg and W.P. Ross, who subsequently switched to supporting the Union. Still later, both were elected to serve as Principal Chief of the Cherokee Nation. Drew continued to support the Confederacy. He performed staff assignments after being relieved in favor of Watie, never again held a combat command.)

Drew's regiment became part of Colonel Cooper's command and was ordered to help stop the flight of Union-supporting Creeks, led by their principal chief Opothleyahola, who were attempting to flee to Kansas. Although the unit participated in the Battle of Round Mountain, the Battle of Chusto-Talasah, and the Battle of Chustenahlah, they made known their dislike for fighting the Creeks, who had done the Cherokees no harm. They had expected to be fighting the invading Yankees, instead.

== Consolidation ==
A portion of Drew's regiment deserted in late 1861. Following the Battle of Old Fort Wayne in October 1862, most of the remainder of Drew's men, including Maj. Thomas Pegg, deserted to the Union army. What remained of his troops were consolidated with 2d Cherokee Mounted Rifles and reorganized as the 1st Regiment of Cherokee Mounted Rifles with Stand Watie in command.

== 1862–1865 ==
During the war, Watie's troops participated in twenty-seven major engagements and numerous smaller skirmishes. Although some of the engagements were set-piece battles, most of their activities utilized guerrilla tactics. Watie's men launched raids from south of the Canadian River throughout northern-held Indian Territory and into Kansas and Missouri, tying down thousands of Union troops. Poorly equipped and armed mostly with castoff rifles or captured weapons, the Cherokees were well suited to this type of warfare. Watie was promoted to brigadier general in May 1864.

Watie's most spectacular victories included the Ambush of the steamboat J. R. Williams, in June 1864, and the capture of a Union wagon train at the Second Battle of Cabin Creek in September 1864. His three most infamous actions were the burning of Rose Cottage, home of Chief John Ross, and the Cherokee Council House in October 1863, and the massacre of detachments of the First Kansas Colored Infantry and 2nd Regiment Kansas Volunteer Cavalry at the Hay Camp Action (a.k.a. the Battle of Flat Rock) in September 1864.

In February 1865 Stand Watie was given command of the Indian Division of Indian Territory but was unable to launch any offensive operations. He released most of his troops following the collapse of Confederate resistance in the spring of 1865. After participating in the Camp Napoleon Council in May, Stand Watie officially surrendered on June 23, 1865, becoming the last Confederate general to lay down his arms. The regiment was disbanded.
