= Battle of Chusto-Talasah =

Battle of the American Civil War

Coordinates: 36.2823°N 95.9502°W

- Part of the Trans-Mississippi Theater of the American Civil War
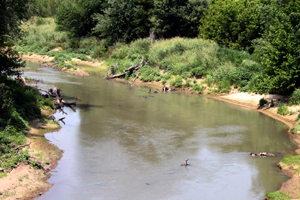
- The Chusto-Talasah battlefield as it exists today. Photo taken July 2011 by Jeffrey S. Williams
Date	December 9, 1861
Location	Tulsa County, Oklahoma
Result	Confederate victory

Belligerents
Creek; Seminole	(Confederate States of America) Confederacy; Cherokee; Choctaw

Commanders and leaders
Opothleyahola	Douglas H. Cooper

Strength
2,000–2,500 men	1,300 men

Casualties and losses
9 killed 500 total	15–30 killed 37 wounded ~400 deserted

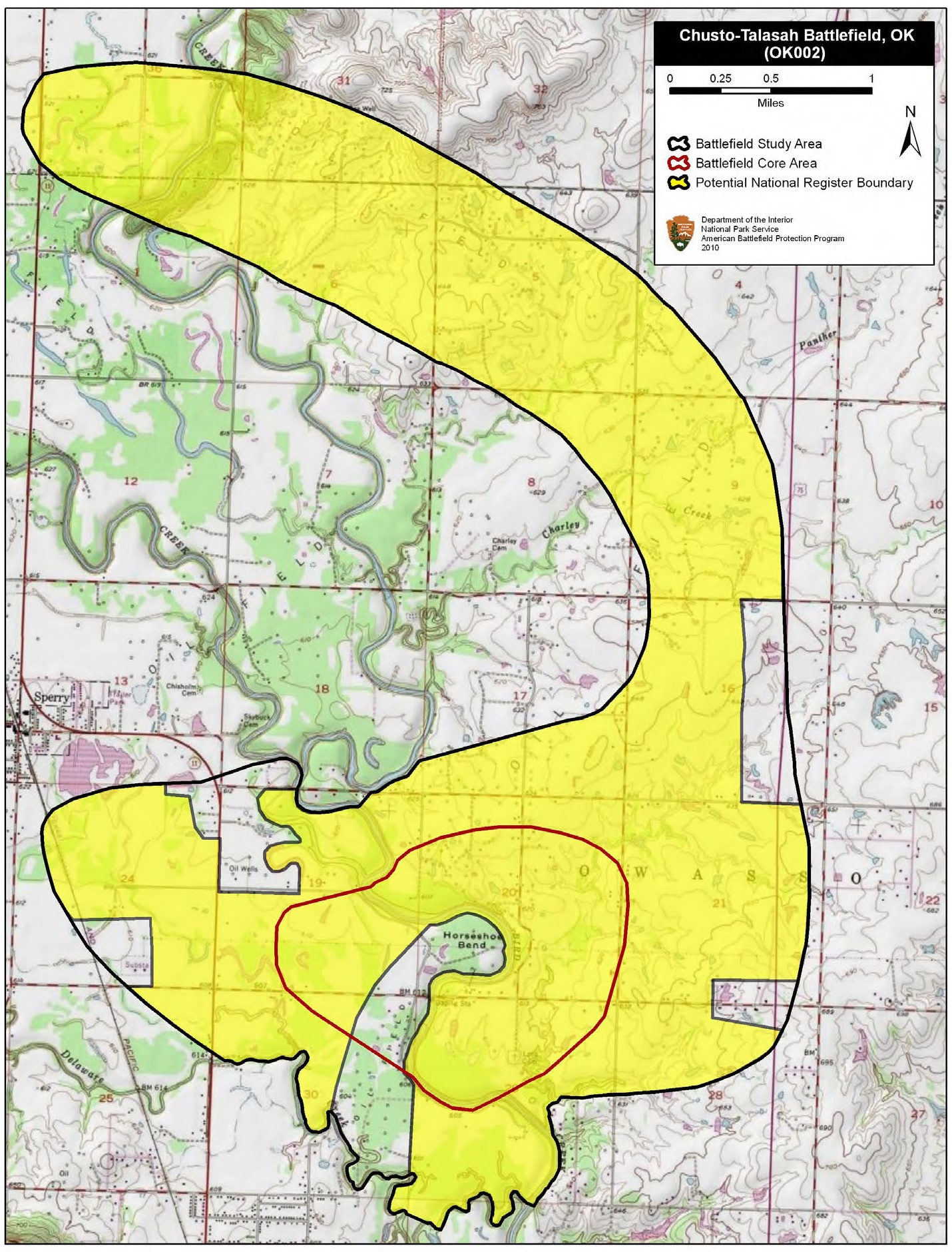
Map of Chusto-Talasah Battlefield core and study areas by the American Battlefield Protection Program.

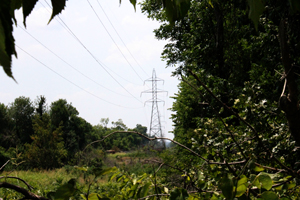
High Voltage Transmission Lines now traverse over the core battlefield land at Chusto-Talasah. Photo taken in July 2011 by Jeffrey S. Williams

The Battle of Chusto-Talasah, also known as Bird Creek, Caving Banks, and High Shoal, was fought December 9, 1861, in what is now Tulsa County, Oklahoma (then Indian Territory) during the American Civil War. It was the second of three battles in the Trail of Blood on Ice campaign for the control of Indian Territory during the American Civil War.

A series of battles were fought in December in bad weather between the Confederate Cherokee and Choctaw Indians and the Union Creek and Seminole Indians (led by the Muscogee Creek chief Opothleyahola) who supported the Federal government. Following Opothleyahola and his Union force’s defeat at Round Mountain, he retreated northeastward in search of safety. On December 9, 1861, the force was at Chusto-Talasah (Caving Banks) on the Horseshoe Bend of Bird Creek when Col. Douglas H. Cooper’s 1,300 Confederates attacked about 2:00 p.m. Chief Opothleyahola knew Cooper was coming and had placed his troops in a strong position in heavy timber at Horseshoe Bend.

For almost four hours, Cooper attacked and attempted to outflank the Federals, finally driving them across Bird Creek just before dark. Cooper camped there overnight but did not pursue the Federals because he was short of ammunition. The Confederates claimed victory, although some sources credit Opothleyahola's forces with driving off the attackers. In any event, Chief Opothleyahola and his band moved on in search of security elsewhere. Their loss was estimated by Cooper as 500 (some accounts suggest 412). Confederate casualties were 15 killed and 37 wounded.

Regardless of whether the Confederates had gained a minor tactical victory here, they would win a resounding one later in the month at Chustenahlah.

The Chusto-Talasah battle site is on privately owned land near 86th Street North and Delaware Avenue, 5 miles northwest of modern Tulsa. A granite marker on the east side of Sperry, Oklahoma places the battlesite 9 miles N.E.S.E. of that point.

== Order of battle ==
Cooper's Brigade - Col. Douglas H. Cooper

- 6 companies, 1st Choctaw-Chickasaw Mounted Rifles - Maj. Mitchell Laflore
- Detachment, Choctaw Battalion - Capt. Alfred Wade
- Detachment, 1st Creek Regiment - Col. Daniel N. McIntosh
- Detachment, Creek Indians - Capt. James M. C. Smith
- 1st Cherokee Mounted Rifle Regiment - Col. John Drew
- 4th Texas Cavalry Regiment - Col. William B. Sims
- Detachment, 9th Texas Cavalry - Lt. Col. William Quayle
- Whitfield’s Battalion - Capt. John W. Whitfield

Creek and Seminole Indians - Chief Opothleyahola

- Lockapoka Creeks
- Muscogee Creeks
- Seminoles - Halleck Tustenuggee, Sonuk Mikko

== See also ==
- List of battles fought in Oklahoma
- Battle of Chustenahlah
- Trail of Blood on Ice
