= Halleck Tustenuggee =

Seminole warchief

Halleck Tustenuggee (also spelled Halek Tustenuggee and Hallock Tustenuggee; c. 1807 – ?) was a 19th-century Mikasuki war chief. He fought against the United States government in the Second Seminole War and for the government in the American Civil War.

== Biography ==
Tvstvnvke ("tustenuggee"), translated as "Warrior" or "Grand Chief of War", was a Muskogean language title for the war leader of a tribal town. The Tvstvnvke was appointed by the Mēkko (civil chief), and was responsible for leading the towns' warriors, advising the civil chief on matters relating to war, maintaining public order, and organizing stickball games with other towns.

Halleck was born in central Florida as a Micosukee. He vehemently opposed the seizure of Indian lands by whites, and even killed his own sister by cutting her throat when she talked about surrender. He fought at the Battle of Lake Okeechobee on December 25, 1837, and took control of the Mikasuki force from their aged leader Abiaka (also known as "Sam Jones").

On April 22, 1839, Halleck and other Seminole leaders met with Maj. Gen. Alexander Macomb, the new military commander in Florida Territory, and received written assurance that their people could indefinitely remain in Florida if they stayed near Lake Okeechobee. Both parties believed that the war was finally over, but attacks by other bands of Indians in south Florida continued and the ceasefire soon ended.

Halleck was severely wounded by U.S. troops at a skirmish at Fort King (in present-day Ocala) in April 1840 against Capt. Gabriel J. Rains (a future Civil War Confederate General). After he recovered, Halleck Tustenuggee went on a bloody rampage in north Florida for two years, leading a series of raids and skirmishes. In January 1842, the army sent the Second Infantry Regiment in pursuit of Halleck's warband. They located the Seminoles' camp near Lake George, but the Indians escaped capture.

Halleck, with a band of seventy warriors, was finally defeated by Federal troops on April 19, 1842, near the settlement of Peliklakaha Hammock (Abraham's Town), in today's Sumter County, Florida, the last battle of the Second Seminole War in Florida. The chief traveled from fort to fort talking about a formal surrender, all the while collecting supplies and rations for his remaining people. Finally, Federal officer William J. Worth, wise to the trick, lured Halleck's family to Fort King with a promise of food and whiskey at a celebration. Halleck soon arrived and was captured. He was held as a prisoner of war with his people on Cedar Key. On July 14, Halleck and 66 of his followers were transported out of Florida for the West. They arrived at Fort Gibson in the Indian Territory on September 5, 1842. Halleck briefly returned to Florida in 1850 to try to negotiate with Chief Billy Bowlegs, who was still opposing resettlement.

During the Civil War, Halleck Tustenuggee, along with some of the other Seminole leaders, such as Sonuk Mikko and John Chupco, supported the Federal government. When Confederate troops and pro-South Indian tribes moved against pro-Union Indians, Halleck joined the band of Creek leader Opothleyahola. Halleck seems to have been the primary field-commander of the Seminole warriors in three battles – Round Mountain, Chusto-Talasah and Chustenahlah, where they were defeated and forced to flee to Kansas in severe winter weather. Halleck and his survivors settled near Fort Row, where several died of exposure and disease.

== Sources ==
- Fort Gibson muster roll for 1842
- U.S. War Department, The War of the Rebellion: A Compilation of the Official Records of the Union and Confederate Armies, 70 volumes in 4 series. Washington, D.C.: United States Government Printing Office, 1880–1901. Series 1, Volume 8, Part 1, pages 21–23.
