= John Drew (Cherokee) =

Cherokee leader (1796–1865)

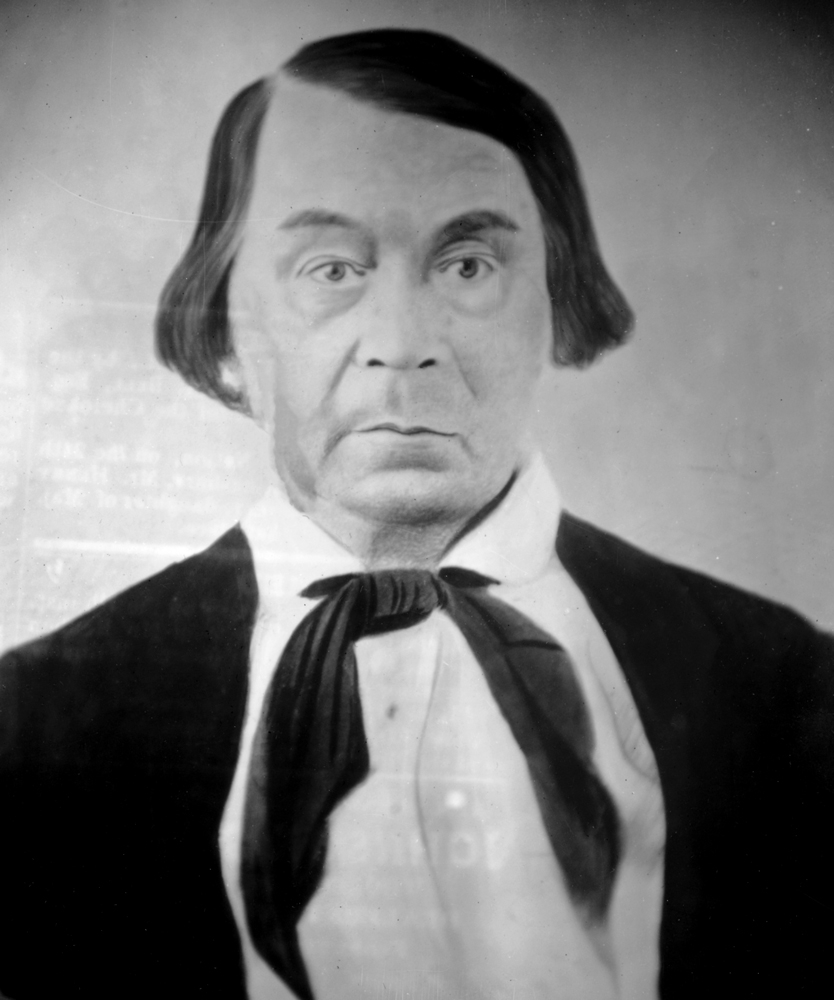

Cherokee leader

Personal details
- Born: John Thompson Drew; December 25, 1796 Cherokee Nation (present day Georgia)
- Died: August 26, 1865 (aged 68) Fort Gibson, Cherokee Nation
- Military service
- Allegiance: Confederate States
- Branch: Confederate States Army
- Service years: 1861–1862
- Rank: Colonel
- Commands: 1st Cherokee Mounted Rifles
- Battles: American Civil War; Battle of Chusto-Talasah; Battle of Pea Ridge

John Thompson Drew (1796 – August 25, 1865) was a military and political leader of the Cherokee Nation. Born in 1796, there is little written about his life until he led a company of Cherokee emigrants from Georgia to Indian Territory. He is best known for joining the Confederate army at the outbreak of the American Civil War, when he raised, organized and led the 1st Cherokee Mounted Rifles.

== Early life ==
Drew fought in the Battle of Claremore Mound in 1817. The last of thirteen groups to embark from the Southeast for Indian Territory on the Trail of Tears was led by him. This group, which included Chief John Ross and his family, traveled by flatboat down the Hiwassee and the Tennessee Rivers. They departed from the Cherokee Agency on December 7, 1838. The trip was especially difficult because extreme drought in that year had caused a major drop in water level along the Tennessee. (Note: According to one source, when John Ross' wife Quatie and several other passengers became ill during the trip, Ross purchased the steamboat Victoria at Tuscumbia, Alabama to carry the sick people.)

== Slave revolt of 1842 ==
By November, 1842, he had become a captain in the Cherokee Militia. On November 15, 1842, a group of at least 25 black slaves escaped from the plantation of Joseph Vann near Webbers Falls and fled in the direction of Mexico, where slavery had already been outlawed. The Cherokee National Council resolved, and Chief John Ross approved that the Cherokee Militia, commanded by Drew, pursue the fleeing slaves. Drew raised a company of 100 men to arrest the fugitive slaves and return them to Fort Gibson. The militia left Talequah on November 21. By November 28, the militiamen caught up with the runaways about 7 miles (11 km) north of the Red River. The runaways were starving and submitted to Drew and his men, who returned them to Fort Gibson on December 7.

== American Civil War ==
National Color of the 1st Cherokee Mounted Rifles

Drew is best known for commanding the 1st Cherokee Mounted Rifles, a Confederate mounted infantry regiment, during the first two years of the American Civil War. His unit, under the command of Colonel Douglas Cooper was ordered to attack a large party of pro-Union Creeks, led by their chief, Opothleyahola, who were encamped on Bird Creek, near the present city of Tulsa. However, most of Drew's soldiers did not want to fight their former friends. Instead of preparing to charge the Creek camp, the majority of Cherokees simply deserted. (Note: Harris reports that 400 of Drew's Cherokees deserted after the battle.) Only Drew and 28 of his men remained with Cooper and the Confederates.

Drew remained loyal to the Confederate cause. Principal Chief John Ross pardoned and promised amnesty to those who had deserted. In 1864, when it was apparent that the Confederate cause would be defeated by the Union, Drew moved into the Chickasaw Nation, closer to the northern border of Texas. He moved back to his former plantation only after the Confederate surrender.

== Death ==
Drew contracted lung fever (Note: Lung fever was an old name for pneumonia.) near the end of the American Civil War and died of the disease at Fort Gibson on August 25, 1865. He was buried on his estate at Bayou Menard, in present-day Muskogee County, Oklahoma.

== Notes ==
Military offices
New regiment	Commanding officer of the 1st Cherokee Mounted Rifles; 1861–1862	Succeeded by Colonel Stand Watie
