= Skiatook, Oklahoma =

- City
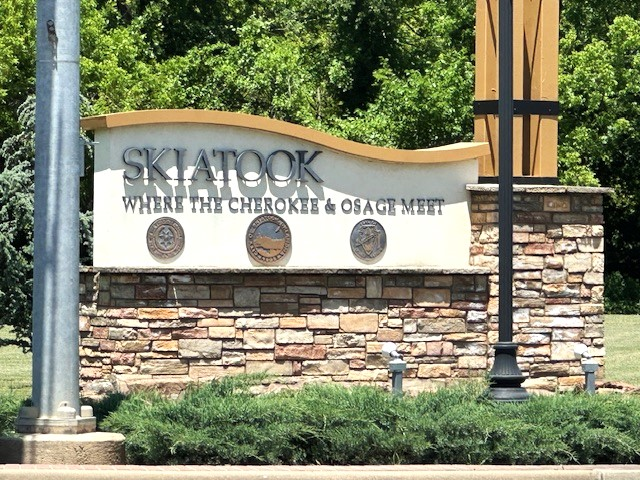
- Skiatook Welcome Sign in May of 2025
- Nickname: Gateway to the Osage
- Motto: "Live Work Play Skiatook"
- Location of within Tulsa County, and the state of Oklahoma
- Coordinates: 36°22′35″N 96°10′36″W
- Country: United States
- State: Oklahoma
- Counties: Osage, Tulsa

Area
  - Total: 13.86 sq mi (35.89 km^{2})
  - Land: 13.71 sq mi (35.52 km^{2})
  - Water: 0.14 sq mi (0.37 km^{2})
- Elevation: 814 ft (248 m)

Population (2020)
  - Total: 8,450
  - Density: 616.1/sq mi (237.88/km^{2})
- Time zone: UTC-6 (Central (CST))
  - Summer (DST): UTC-5 (CDT)
- ZIP code: 74070
- Area codes: 539/918
- FIPS code: 40-67850
- GNIS feature ID: 2413294
- Website: www.cityofskiatook.com

Skiatook (Skī·ǎ·tōōk or Skī·ǎ·tǒǒk versus Skī·tōōk or Skī·tǒǒk) is a city in Osage and Tulsa counties in the U.S. state of Oklahoma located in the northeastern part of the state, approximately 20 miles north and west of Tulsa. Due to its location on the border between Osage County and Tulsa County, Skiatook has been referred to as "the Gateway to the Osage." The town includes the state highway junction of Oklahoma State Highway 11 and Oklahoma State Highway 20. The population was 8,450 at the 2020 census, an increase of 14.24 percent over the figure of 7,397 recorded in 2010.

== History ==
=== 19th century ===
==== Battle of Chustenahlah ====
The Battle of Chustenahlah was fought just west of Skiatook, on December 26, 1861, during the American Civil War. The battle began when Confederate Col. James McIntosh ordered an attack on the Union aligned Creek Chief Opothleyahola's forces. Opothleyahola was travelling with about 1,700 Creek and Seminole refugees following his defeat at the Battle of Chusto-Talasah. After being defeated by the Confederate forces, many refugees were forced to abandoned their supplies as they fled to Kansas. A historical marker commemorates the battle.

==== Founding and origin of name ====
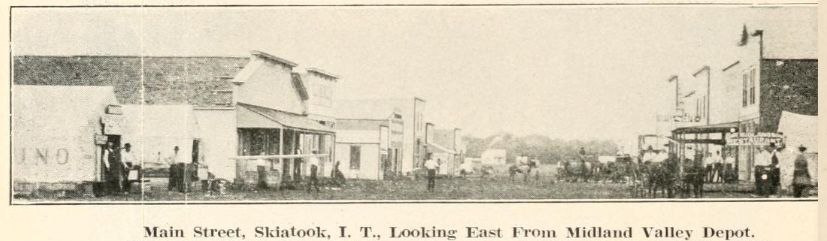
Skiatook's main street prior to statehood

In 1880, a trading post was opened by William Charles Rogers on the south bank of Bird Creek, several miles north of present-day Skiatook. On March 12, 1880, a post office was established in Rogers former trading post under the name of ski-a-took, Cherokee nation. The word is Cherokee in origin, and means "Big-Indian-Me" or refers to something of large size. By order of the U.S. postal service, on April 11, 1892, the name officially became Skiatook. December 18, 1904, Rogers moved his store and the post office to present day Skiatook. After being elected the Cherokee Chair in 1904, Rogers remained in Skiatook until his death in 1917.

===== Hillside Mission School =====
Built in 1886 and run by the Friends Society of Philadelphia 4 miles north of the main area of Skiatook to serve to convert local native groups. The mission school first started by Simon Abbot in 1880 and then run by John Murdok in 1882. Under Murdok, a church was added and expanded the dormitory wings of the school and the addition of a gymnasium. On the property is a ceremonial Cherokee burial site, though there has not been any account found of any abuses to the native students at the school. The school served both white students and native students, with the majority of the student base being of mixed raced native/white students who already spoke some English. Many children who attended the school parents were settlers just coming into the territory working on farms nearby the school. The school seemed to have ceased operations by 1920, an article in The Daily Oklahoman in 1957 published a story of ex-students who remarked on having attended the school as children

=== 20th century ===
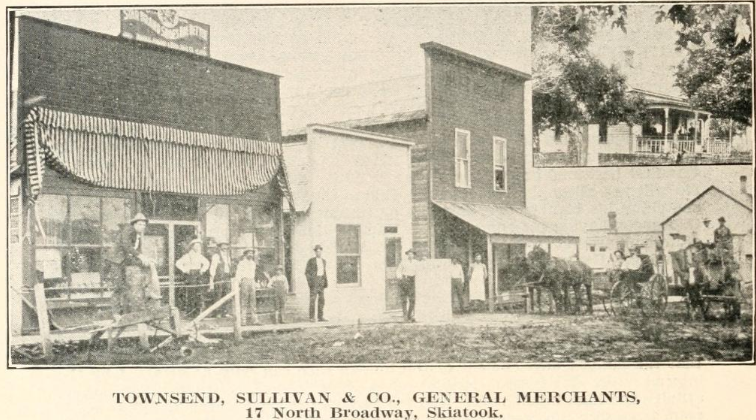
Skiatook's general store prior to statehood

1904 plats were laid out for business to build on and soon many businesses opened including the town bank by William C Rogers under the name "Skiatook Bank" and then changed later to "First National Bank". Starting in 1911 expansions for the bank marked the moment of significance to its commercial contribution to Skiatook for the early 20th century. going from $5,000 in stock 1905 to $10,000 in 1911. By 1921 stock amassed to $25,000. In 1930 owner ship of the bank was taken over by Alex Fox who renamed it to "Exchange Bank of Skiatook". in 1950 the bank was relocated to a different building and the original space served different commercial business until it became permanently vacant. The original building as September 2025 remains lists as an official historical site by the Oklahoma Historical Society

In March 1905 the Midland Valley Railroad was built through the town and the settlement expanded to include parts of Osage County and the Osage Nation. The route no longer exists, but has been converted from rail into the 14.5 mile Osage Prairie Trail linking Skiatook with Tulsa to the south.

Skiatook's first newspaper, the Skiatook Sentinel, began publication in April 1905, however publication ceased in 1912, and was replaced by the Skiatook Journal, which now resides under the Tulsa World. Skiatook's first school was also founded in 1905 and elected its first school board in 1907. The school was located in a house on the southeast corner of 4th and Broadway.

After Oklahoma Statehood in 1907, construction began on permanent roads and bridges. The first church building constructed in Skiatook was the First Christian Church in 1907. Cement sidewalks were constructed between 1909 and 1910, and in 1912 Skiatook received water, sewer and electric light improvements. By 1920, the town's population had increased to around 2000. A road to Tulsa was paved in the early 1920s, and with good roads leading out in all directions, Skiatook became known as the "Gateway to all points North, South, East and West". In the 1930s, Skiatook began purchasing water from Lake Spavinaw. The completion of Skiatook Lake in 1984 gave Skiatook its own water source.

=== 21st century ===
In the 2000s, Skiatook commissioned a "Main Street Program" in order to revitalize its downtown area.

== Geography ==
Skiatook is located in the northeastern part of the state, approximately 20 miles northwest of Tulsa. Due to its location on the border between Osage County and Tulsa County, Skiatook has been referred to as "The Gateway to the Osage." The town includes the junction of Oklahoma State Highway 11 and Oklahoma State Highway 20. State Highways 20 and 11 intersect on the east side of Skiatook's downtown, and State Highway 20 connects Skiatook with U.S. 75. The Skiatook Central Retail Corridor is a five-mile segment of State Highway 20 that runs through the center of the community and directs thousands of visitors each year to the area's main destination, Skiatook Lake.

=== Skiatook Lake ===
Skiatook Dam and Lake was authorized for construction by the Flood Control Act approved October 23, 1962 (87th Congress). It is one of five projects in the Bird Creek Basin plan recommended to meet the comprehensive water resources needs of the area. The Damsite ("Damsite") is located on Hominy Creek about 5 miles (8 km) west of Skiatook in Osage County, Oklahoma. The project serves the purposes of flood control, water quality improvement, municipal and industrial water supply, recreation, and fish and wildlife management. The total cost of the project was approximately $120 million. It was completed in 1984, and the lake elevated 714.0 feet (217.6 m) above sea level-has a surface area of about 10,500 acres (42 km^{2}) and 160 miles (260 km) of shoreline. Approximately 8,000 acres around the lake are open for public hunting.

Historical local sources describe significant public debate prior to its construction. According to community accounts, the Osage Indian Tribe and local oil and gas producers raised concerns in the 1960s about the impact the lake would have on active leases and properties in the Hominy Creek floodplain. Another proposal was the Candy Creek Lake project and it was abandoned after tribal opposition, which cleared the way for Skiatook Lake to be complete. Construction continued through the 1970s, and the lake was finally filled and dedicated in October 1984.

Skiatook Lake today has eight public boat launching ramps, seven courtesy docks, three designated camping areas, two picnic areas, one group shelter, two public swimming beaches, and one public concession area. The U.S. Army Corps of Engineers maintains a lake management office near the west end of the dam.

The Skiatook Lake Association was formed shortly after the lake's completion in 1985. Its primary focus has been to promote lake related activities and improve the lake and surrounding areas. The association hosts an annual Fourth of July celebration, which draws several thousand visitors to the area.

== Demographics ==
Historical population
Census	Pop.	Note	%±
1910	606		—
1920	1,653		172.8%
1930	1,789		8.2%
1940	1,496		−16.4%
1950	1,734		15.9%
1960	2,503		44.3%
1970	2,930		17.1%
1980	3,596		22.7%
1990	4,910		36.5%
2000	5,396		9.9%
2010	7,397		37.1%
2020	8,450		14.2%

=== 2020 census ===
As of the 2020 census, Skiatook had a population of 8,450. The median age was 36.4 years. 27.8% of residents were under the age of 18 and 14.8% of residents were 65 years of age or older. For every 100 females there were 93.7 males, and for every 100 females age 18 and over there were 90.0 males age 18 and over.

85.5% of residents lived in urban areas, while 14.5% lived in rural areas.

There were 3,117 households in Skiatook, of which 37.2% had children under the age of 18 living in them. Of all households, 50.2% were married-couple households, 16.3% were households with a male householder and no spouse or partner present, and 27.6% were households with a female householder and no spouse or partner present. About 25.3% of all households were made up of individuals and 12.2% had someone living alone who was 65 years of age or older.

There were 3,358 housing units, of which 7.2% were vacant. Among occupied housing units, 66.6% were owner-occupied and 33.4% were renter-occupied. The homeowner vacancy rate was 1.4% and the rental vacancy rate was 8.7%.

Racial composition as of the 2020 census
Race	Percent
White	69.5%
Black or African American	0.7%
American Indian and Alaska Native	15.3%
Asian	0.2%
Native Hawaiian and Other Pacific Islander	0.1%
Some other race	1.7%
Two or more races	12.5%
Hispanic or Latino (of any race)	4.4%

=== 2010 census ===
In the 2010 census, there were 7,397 people, 2,796 households, and 1,989 families residing in the town. The population density was 456.2 inhabitants per square mile (176.1/km^{2}). There were 2,125 housing units at an average density of 145.3 units per square mile (56.1 units/km^{2}). The racial makeup of the town was 73.3% White, 0.6% African American, 17.7% Native American, 0.6% Asian, 0.01% Pacific Islander, 0.6% from other races, and 8.86% from two or more races. Hispanic or Latino of any race were 2.9% of the population.

There were 2,796 households, out of which 36.1% had children under the age of 18 living with them, 49.6% were married couples living together, 15.0% had a female householder with no husband present, and 28.9% were non-families. 24.0% of all households were made up of individuals, and 10% had someone living alone who was 65 years of age or older. The average household size was 2.63 and the average family size was 3.11.

In the town, the population was spread out, with 31.0% under the age of 18, 9.3% from 18 to 24, 28.1% from 25 to 44, 18.2% from 45 to 64, and 13.3% who were 65 years of age or older. The median age was 32 years. For every 100 females, there were 85.9 males. For every 100 females age 18 and over, there were 81.9 males.

The median income for a household in the town was $39,617, and the median income for a family was $52,072. Males had a median income of $30,873 versus $21,419 for females. The per capita income for the town was $19,943. About 9.4% of families and 12.9% of the population were below the poverty line, including 17.7% of those under age 18 and 11.6% of those age 65 or over.

== Government ==
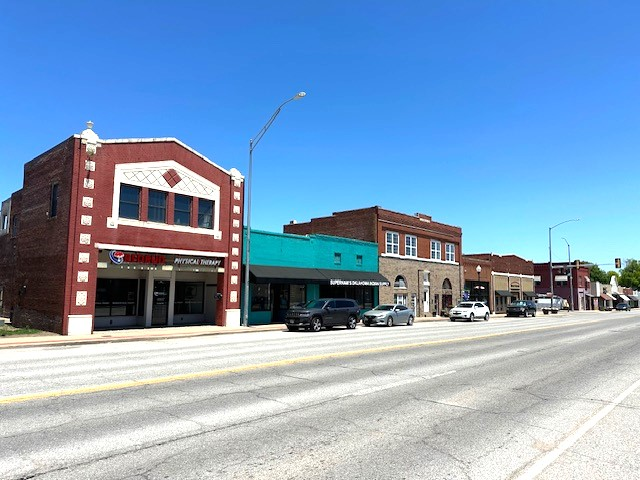
Downtown Skiatook in May 2025

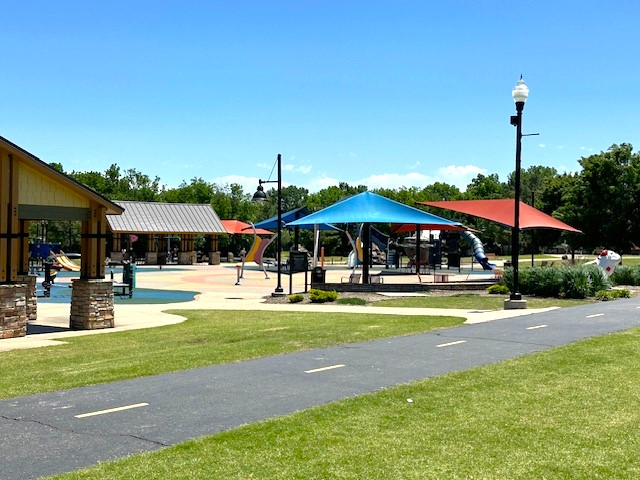
Central Park in Skiatook, May of 2025

Skiatook has a city government with a 7-member city council and a city manager. The city operates under the council-manager form of government, in which the elected council sets policy and the city manager oversees daily operations. The current mayor is Cody Fuentes (term ends April 2027) and the current vice-mayor is Scott Neighbors (2027). Other City Council Members include: Ryan Alonso (2027), Jim Bradshaw (2027), Matt Bragg (2029), and Jerald Freeman (2027), with seat 1 open for election in 2027. The city manager is Brad White, since 2021.

City Administrative offcies are located at 110 North Broadway, Skiatook, Oklahoma 74070, with the mailing address P.O. Box 399, Skiatook, Oklahoma 74070, and a main contact number of 918-396-2797.

The city public services include a full-time fire department, which provides fire suppression, technical rescue, and EMS transport coverage for around 85 square miles. There is a full-time police department with 24-hour E911 communications. Through the Public Works Department there is refuse service, sanitation, and sewage. The city also maintains online access to its municipal code, meeting agendas, and accounted minutes for the City Council and all of the boards and commissions.

=== Parks and recreation ===
In 2010, Skiatook opened a $2.3-million park, Central Park, which features splash pads, new playground equipment, and a pond and walking trails. On April 25, 2025, Phase Two of Central Park was completed, adding a bandstand with shade, Basketball Courts, a shelter and restroom facility, a trail bridge, expanded walking trails, and tennis/pickleball courts.

Completed in 2006, The Osage Prairie walking trail is 14.5 miles (23 km) long, starting in Skiatook. Skiatook residents enjoy multiple recreational opportunities, including Central Park, John Zink Park, Exchange Bank Park, the Skiatook Sports Park, soccer fields, tennis courts, a driving range, shooting range, and Skiatook Lake. There are also numerous little leagues that support football, baseball, softball, and soccer.

The Osage Prairie Trail was constructed with Vision 2025 funds, and this jogging and bike trail connects Skiatook to Tulsa's extensive trail system.The Skiatook community pool opened in the 1950s and provided swimming lessons to thousands of local children. Due to deteriorating conditions, the old pool closed in 2001. The new facility, the Skiatook Municipal Pool, opened to the public on June 2, 2007, and is a subfacility of Exchange Bank Park.

=== Public Schools ===
Skiatook Intermediate Elementary, September 2026

Most of Skiatook is served by the Skiatook Public Schools district. All of Skiatook in Osage County, and most of it in Tulsa County is in the district. The other Tulsa County part is in Collinsville Public Schools.

The first Skiatook Public Schools School Board was elected in 1907 after statehood. The district originally operated out of one building on the corner of 2nd and B streets. In 1908, a bond paid for a new school in the block between 3rd and 4th streets and Osage and B streets. An addition was added to this building in 1913 and an annex was built in 1920 on 3rd and Osage. In 1922, the town approved a new high school and junior high to be built. In 1929, the original school building burned down, leading to the building of a new elementary school in 1930. In the 1960s a new junior high school was built and in 1968 Marrs Elementary was built. In 1976, the current high school was built with a sports complex added in 1978, an auditorium added in 1979. A football stadium, baseball field, soccer field, and agriculture building were also built around the high school. In 1990, Newman Middle School was built and named after former Superintendent Jim Newman. In 2013 Skiatook Elementary was built.

Currently operating Skiatook Public Schools include:

- Joyce Jech Early Childhood Center
- Marrs Elementary
- Skiatook Elementary
- Skiatook Intermediate Elementary
- Newman Middle School
- Skiatook High School
- Skiatook Virtual Academy (virtual school for 6th-12th grades)

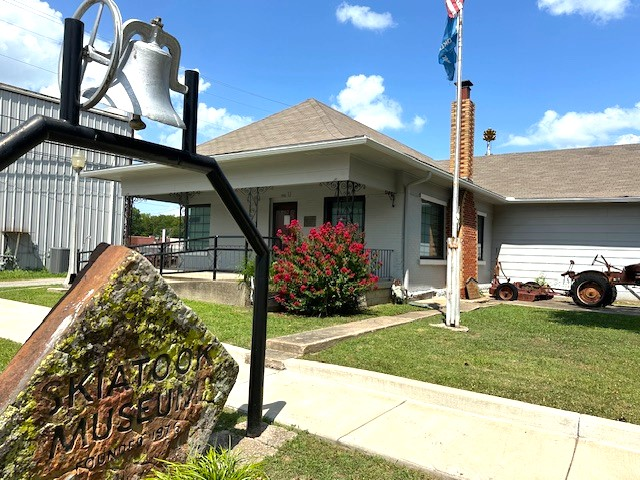
Skiatook Museum in July 2025

== Arts and culture ==
The Skiatook Museum was organized in April 1976. In the early 21st century, the Skiatook Museum partnered with the Oklahoma Historical Society, and moved into the former home of Doctor W. G. Phillips. The home, built in 1912, contained his office.

=== Kihe-kah-Steh Pow Wow ===
The Pow Wow started in 1969 was founded by William J. Supernaw Jr (Little Buffalo or Te-Zhika) who was the grandson to Tall Chief who was the hereditary chief of the Quapaw Tribe who died in 1918. William J Supernaw Jr started the pow wow club in honor of his grandfather and they would meet a few miles northwest of Skiatook every July. Founded by the Quapaw the event is multi-tribal bringing those from Osage, Cherokee, Winnebago, Pawnee and Mohawk members. The intention to honor ancestral culture and servicemen in Tall Chiefs name (Kihe-Kah-Steh is another name for Tall Chief). The Pow Wow is still an ongoing tradition and celebrated its 50-year anniversary in 2019. The Pow Wow hosts many craft and food vendors and holds events for Adults and Children.

== Media ==
Skiatook in film

- Parts of the 1983 film adaptation of S.E. Hinton's novel The Outsiders were filmed in locations around Skiatook, but it was called Windrixville.
- Parts of the 2020 film Minari were filmed in and around Skiatook.
- Parts of the 2025 film The Last Rodeo were filmed in and around locations in Skiatook.
- Parts of 2025 series The Lowdown were filmed in and around Skiatook.
