= LeRoy's post =

- LeRoy, Kansas

Site information
- Type: military post
- Controlled by: Kansas state troops

Site history
- Built: September 12, 1861
- In use: September 12, 1861 to ca. May 1864
- Materials: wood

Garrison information
- Garrison: same

LeRoy's post was an army post in LeRoy, Kansas. Established September 12, 1861 by U.S. Senator James H. Lane, when Fort Scott was threatened by advancing Confederate troops, the Union post was one of many established in eastern Kansas to guard against Confederate guerrilla attack. In spring 1862 a number of Native American refugees who had first camped at Fort Row were moved further north to Fort Belmont and the post at LeRoy.

In May 1862, two Native American regiments were organized at LeRoy from amongst the refugees. They were sent into Indian Territory to fight Confederates, who had occupied the lands from where they had fled. Union troops were stationed at LeRoy until at least May 1864. Since nothing was mentioned of the post after that time, it probably was closed in May 1864 or soon after.
