= Battle of Round Mountain =

Battle of the American Civil War

Coordinates: 36.13°N 96.286944°W

- Part of the Trans-Mississippi Theater of the American Civil War
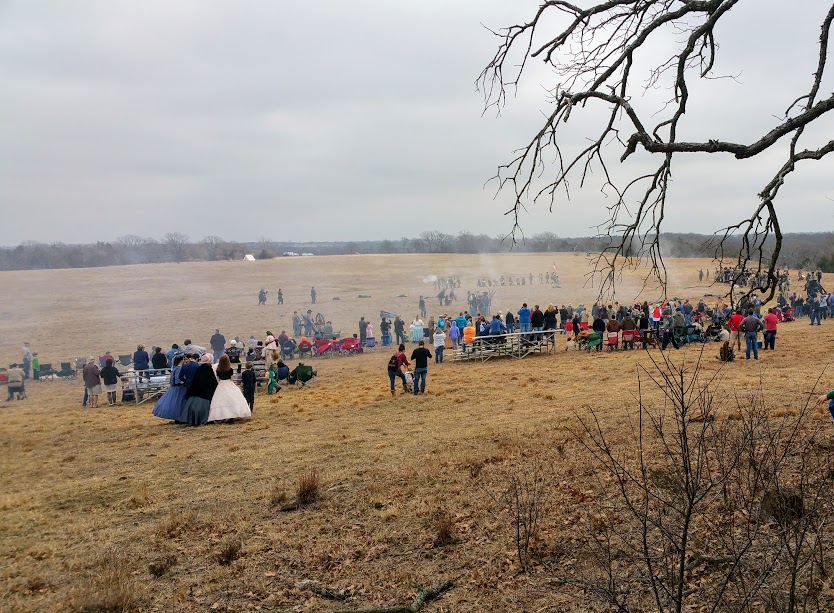
- 2017 re-enactment of the Battle of Round Mountain, at the disputed battle site near Yale, Oklahoma
Date	November 19, 1861
Location	Location disputed, near Keystone, or Yale, Oklahoma
Result	Confederate victory
Territorial changes	Indian Territory

Belligerents
Loyal Indians	Confederate States of America

Commanders and leaders
Opothleyahola	Douglas H. Cooper

Strength
Unknown	1,400 men

Casualties and losses
110 casualties	6 killed 4 wounded 1 missing

The Battle of Round Mountain was the first battle in the Trail of Blood on Ice campaign for the control of Indian Territory during the American Civil War that occurred on November 19, 1861. Its main purpose was to prevent Union supporters of the Creek Nation, led by Opothleyahola from fleeing Indian Territory to the protection of Union forces in Kansas. (Note: Some sources refer to Opothleyahola as Chief. However, one article pointed out that he was not a "...chief, counsellor or head man" in the Creek Nation in 1861. He had been in his younger years, but had resigned the position in 1842. He still retained a good deal of influence with many tribal members, and repeatedly cautioned the Creeks to try to remain neutral in "the white man's war.")

The physical location of the battle is in dispute. Some historians believe it to be near Keystone while others contend that it is near Yale, Oklahoma. The event is sometimes referred to as the Battle of Red Fork.

== Events ==
Col. Douglas H. Cooper, Confederate commander of the Indian Department, was unable to reconcile differences with Opothleyahola, commander of a band of Unionist Creeks and Seminoles. Opothleyahola's group was estimated to number about seventeen hundred people, and also included some Union supporters from the Comanches, Delawares, Kickapoos, Wichitas, and Shawnees. Cooper set out on November 15, 1861, with about 1,400 men either to compel Opothleyahola's submission or "drive him and his party from the country." Cooper's force rode up the Deep Fork of the Canadian River to find Opothleyahola's camp deserted. On November 19, Cooper learned from captured prisoners that part of Opothleyahola's band was erecting a fort at the Red Fork of the Arkansas River. (Note: Red Fork probably refers to the confluence of the Cimarron River and the Arkansas River.)

Cooper's men arrived there around 4:00 p.m. Charging cavalry discovered that Opothleyahola's followers had recently abandoned their camp. The Confederates located and followed stragglers; the 4th Texas blundered into Opothleyahola's warriors on the tree line at the foot of the Round Mountains. The Federal response chased the Confederate cavalry back to Cooper's main force. Darkness prevented Cooper's counterattack until the main enemy force was within 60 yards (55 m). After a short fight, Opothleyahola's men set fire to the prairie grass and retreated.

The following morning, Cooper advanced on Opothleyahola's new camp but found that the Federal forces had fled. The Confederates claimed victory because Opothleyahola had left the area. The Confederates captured abandoned supplies, such as Opothleyahola's carriage, a dozen wagons, food, cattle and ponies. The Confederate loss in the engagement was 1 captain and 5 men killed, 3 severely and 1 slightly wounded, and 1 missing. Opothleyahola lost about 110 killed and wounded.

This was the first of three encounters between Opothleyahola's Union bands and Confederate troops. The Unionists were forced to flee to Kansas after the Battle of Chustenahlah at the end of the year.

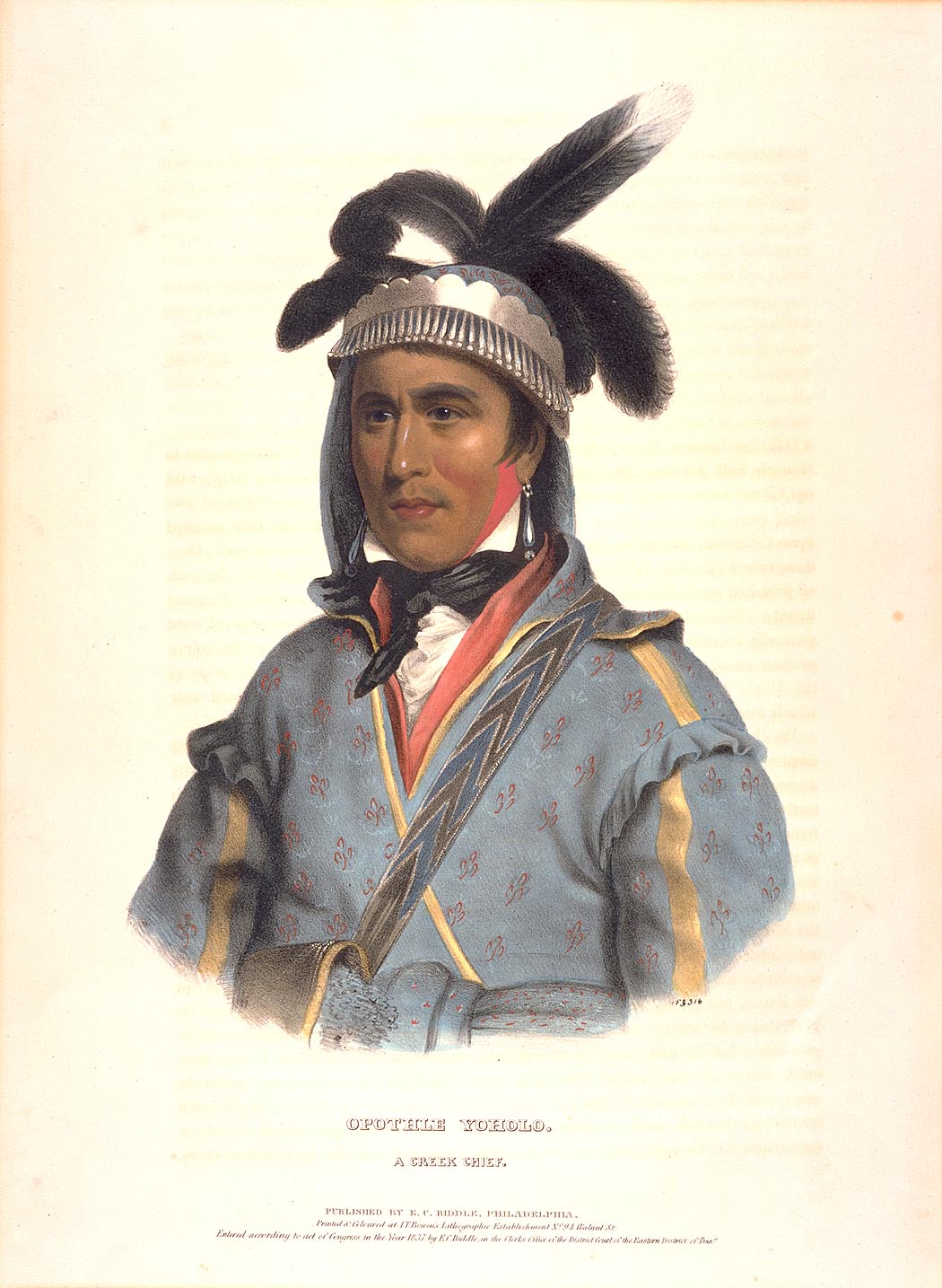
Opothleyahola as a young man

== Battle site controversy ==
The site of this event has been disputed for many years, with two locations emerging as the leading choices. One is near the present day town of Yale, Oklahoma. The other is close to the former site of Keystone (which is now submerged by the waters of Keystone Lake). Angie Debo, a noted Oklahoma historian, wrote an article describing the evidence for and against each site. She concluded that the evidence pointed more strongly to the Yale site.

== Order of battle ==
=== Confederate ===
Cooper's Brigade - Col. Douglas H. Cooper

- 6 companies, 1st Regiment Choctaw-Chickasaw Mounted Rifles - Maj. Mitchell Laflore
- Detachment, 1st Creek Mounted Rifles - Col. Daniel N. McIntosh
- Detachment, 2nd Creek Mounted Rifles - Lt. Col. Chilly McIntosh
- Detachment, Seminole Indians - Maj. John Jumper
- Detachment, 9th Texas Cavalry - Lt. Col. William Quayle

=== Union ===
Creek and Seminole Indians - Opothleyahola

- Lockapoka Creeks
- Muscogee Creeks
- Seminoles - Halleck Tustenuggee, Sonuk Mikko

== See also ==
- Trail of Blood on Ice
- List of battles fought in Oklahoma
