= Battle of Chustenahlah =

Battle of the American Civil War

Coordinates: 36.3878°N 96.0752°W

- Part of the Trans-Mississippi Theater of the American Civil War
Date	December 26, 1861
Location	Osage County, Oklahoma
Result	Confederate victory

Belligerents
Creeks; Seminoles	(Confederate States of America) CSA (Confederacy)

Commanders and leaders
Opothleyahola	Douglas H. Cooper; James M. McIntosh; Stand Watie

Strength
1,700 men	1,380 men

Casualties and losses
250 killed and wounded 180 people captured	9 killed 40 wounded

The Battle of Chustenahlah was fought in Osage County, Oklahoma, (then Indian Territory) on December 26, 1861, during the American Civil War. A band of 9,000 pro-Union Native Americans was forced to flee to Kansas in bitter cold and snow in what became known as the Trail of Blood on Ice.

== Background ==
Confederate States Army troops undertook a campaign to subdue the Native American Union (Northern / Federal) sympathizers in the federal Indian Territory (modern state of Oklahoma since 1907) and consolidate increasing Southern control. They attacked Chief Opothleyahola's band of Creek and Seminole (led by Chief Halek Tustenuggee) at the battles of Round Mountain and Chusto-Talasah. The Confederates wanted to finish off the Indians by attacking them in their camp at Chustenahlah (corruption of the Cherokee word "U-s-ta-la-na", meaning a shoal or sandbar in a stream or creek) in a well-protected cove on Bird Creek. Colonel James M. McIntosh and Col. Douglas H. Cooper (1815-1879), commanding the C.S. Army's Indian Department, planned a combined attack with each of their columns moving on the camp from different directions. McIntosh left nearby Fort Gibson in the eastern Indian Territory on December 22, with 1,380 men.

== Order of battle ==
McIntosh's Brigade (Confederate) – Col. James McQueen McIntosh

- 5 Companies, South Kansas-Texas Cavalry – Lt. Col. Walter P. Lane
- 6th Texas Cavalry Regiment – Lt. Col. John S. Griffith
- 7 Companies, 11th Texas Cavalry – Col. W. C. Young
- 4 Companies, 2nd Arkansas Mounted Rifles – Capt. William Gipson
- Bennett’s Texas Company – Captain Bennett
- Rock River Rangers Company - Captain George McGregor (was detached to control indians in the area of Esti Capcaki Valley, today north side of Skiatook Lake, Oklahoma.)

Principal Indian Commanders (Union) – Chief Opothleyahola (Creeks), Chief Halek Tustenuggee and Sonuk Mikko (Billy Bowlegs) (Seminoles)

== Battle ==
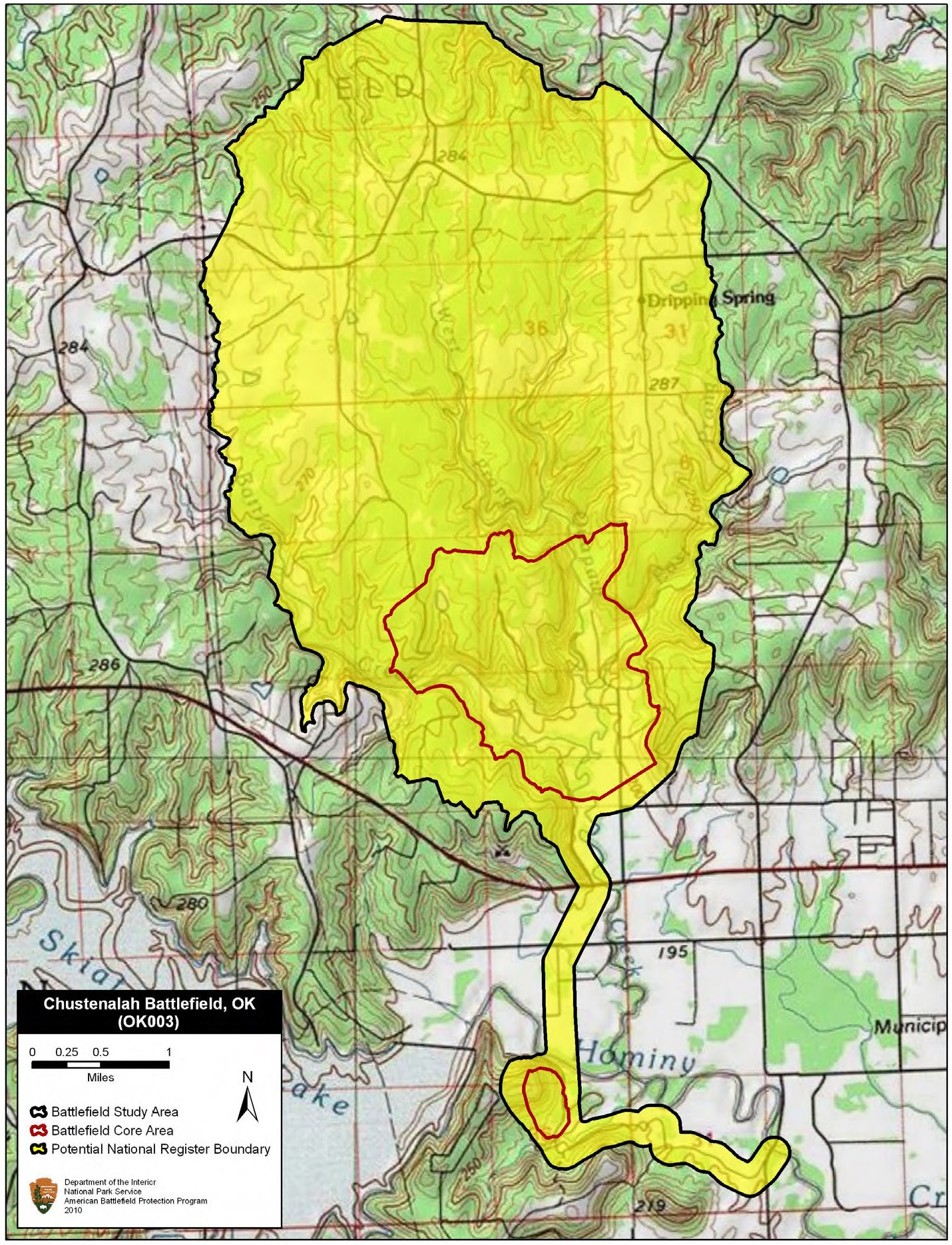
Map of Chustenahlah Battlefield core and study areas by the American Battlefield Protection Program.

On December 25, McIntosh was told that Cooper’s force could not join him for a while, but he decided to attack the next day, despite being outnumbered and facing severe cold weather conditions. McIntosh attacked the camp at noon. The 1,700 pro-Union defenders were secluded in the underbrush along the slope of a rugged hill. McIntosh devised a plan to converge on the crest, with the South Kansas-Texas Cavalry (also known as the 3rd Texas) ordered to charge directly up the steep bluff on foot. The 11th Texas advanced to their left using a defile for concealment, while the 6th Texas circled to the right. As the Confederate attack progressed, the Native Americans began to fall back, taking cover for a while and moving back. The retreat became a rout as the Federals reached their camp. The pro-Union Native Americans tried to defend their position but were forced away again by 4:00 p.m.

The survivors fled; many went all the way to Kansas where they found loyal Unionists. Col. Stand Watie, with 300 Cherokee fighting for the Confederacy, intercepted the fleeing Creek and Seminole, killing 15. Chief Opothleyahola’s band mounted no further resistance after this encounter. The Confederates followed no further. The remaining Union fighters and their families trekked to Fort Row, Kansas, deprived of many of their provisions due to their being forced to flee in haste. Nearly 2,000 died at or shortly after their arrival, due mostly to exposure and disease.

== Outcome ==
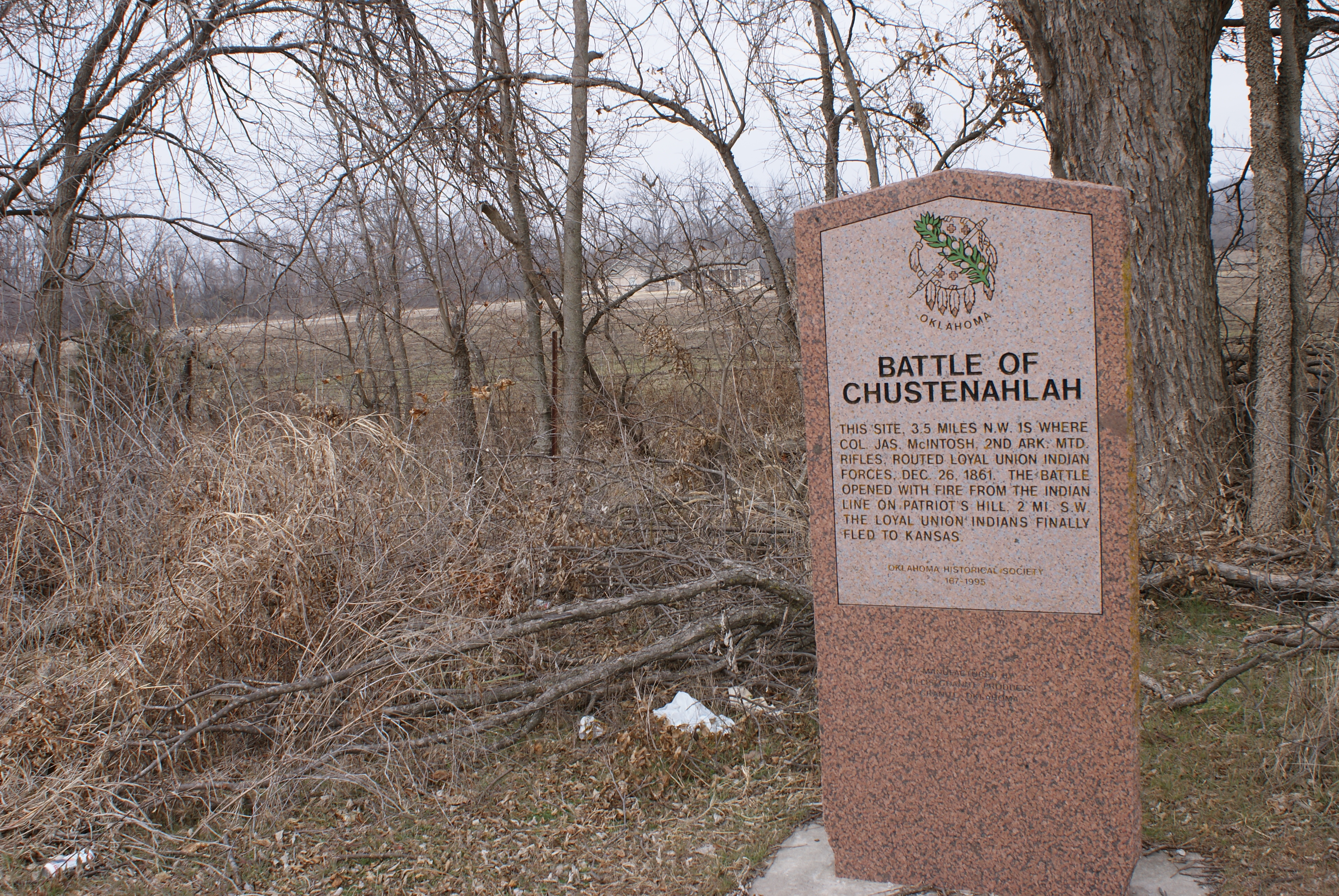
Osage County historical marker

The victorious Confederates captured 160 women and children, 20 blacks, 30 wagons, 70 yoke of oxen, about 500 Indian horses, several hundred head of cattle, 100 sheep, and large quantities of supplies. Casualties were 9 killed and 40 wounded for the Confederates. (Note: Another source gives Confederate losses as 3 killed and 32 wounded.) Col. McIntosh in his official report estimated the Union Indians' loss as 250.

== See also ==
- List of battles fought in Oklahoma
- Battle of Chusto-Talasah
- Trail of Blood on Ice

== Other sources ==
- U.S. War Department, The War of the Rebellion: A Compilation of the Official Records of the Union and Confederate Armies, 70 volumes in 4 series. Washington, D.C.: United States Government Printing Office, 1880-1901. Series 1, Volume 8, Part 1, pages 8–15.
- White, Christine Schultz and White, Benton R., Now The Wolf Has Come: The Creek Nation in the Civil War, Texas A & M University Press, 1996. ISBN 0-89096-689-3.
