= Confederate States Bureau of Indian Affairs =

The Confederate States Bureau of Indian Affairs was a subdivision of the Confederate States War Department established in 1861 to handle the duties the War Department was charged with regarding the Confederacy's relations with the various Indian Nations with which it interacted.

The Bureau was established on March 15, 1861. During the war it was led by David Hubbard, Sutton S. Scott, and Douglas H. Cooper.

== Commissioners of the Bureau ==
Image	Name	Took office	Left office
	David Hubbard	15 March 1861	7 April 1862
	Sutton S. Scott	8 April 1862	1863
	David Hubbard	1863	21 February 1865
	Brig. Gen. Douglas H. Cooper	21 February 1865	April 1865

== Commanders of the Department of the Indian Territory ==
Image	Name	Took office	Left office
	Brig. Gen. Albert Pike	16 March 1861	? 1862
	Brig. Gen. Benjamin McCulloch	?	7 March 1862
	Brig. Gen. Albert Pike	7 March 1862	5 November 1862
	Col. Douglas H. Cooper	5 November 1862	8 January 1863
	Brig. Gen. William Steele	8 January 1863	11 December 1863
	Brig. Gen. Samuel B. Maxey	11 December 1863	21 February 1865
	Brig. Gen. Douglas H. Cooper	21 February 1865	April 1865
