= Trail of Blood on Ice =

1861 American Civil War campaign

The Trail of Blood on Ice was a December 1861 campaign in the American Civil War in which pro-Union Native Americans, led by Upper Creek Chief Opothleyahola, fought their way north from Indian Territory (then under Confederate control) to Fort Row, Kansas. They faced continuing attacks from Confederate forces under Col. Douglas H. Cooper.

== Background ==
With the secession of eleven Southern states in 1861, both the Union and the Confederate States of America vied for control of the Indian Territory. Old tribal rivalries were renewed, with some aligning with the North and others with the South.

When a Confederate force under Col. Douglas H. Cooper attacked Unionist tribes in the Indian Territory, Upper Creek Chief Opothleyahola resisted and led Unionist Creek and Seminole from McIntosh County, Oklahoma north to Fort Row, Kansas. These Indian warriors fought Cooper in a series of battles in the winter of 1861–62. They withdrew to Kansas in a bitterly harsh trek known as the "Trail of Blood on Ice."

== Battle of Round Mountain ==
The first engagement, the Battle of Round Mountain occurred on November 19, 1861, near the Red Fork of the Arkansas River. The actual location is in dispute as some historians believe it to be near Keystone, while others believe it to be near Yale, Oklahoma. The evidence slightly favors the site near Yale, known as Twin Mounds.

Cooper's men arrived there around 4:00 p.m. Charging cavalry discovered that Opothleyahola's followers had recently abandoned their camp. The Confederates located and followed stragglers; the 4th Texas blundered into Opothleyahola's warriors on the tree line at the foot of the Round Mountains. The Federal response chased the Confederate cavalry back to Cooper's main force. Darkness prevented Cooper's counterattack until the main enemy force was within 60 yards. After a short fight, Opothleyahola's men set fire to the prairie grass and retreated.

== Battle of Chusto-Talasah ==
The second engagement, the Battle of Chusto-Talasah also known as "Caving Banks," was fought on December 9, 1861, near Sperry, Oklahoma. For almost four hours, Cooper attacked and attempted to outflank the Federals, finally driving them east across Bird Creek just before dark. Cooper camped there overnight but did not pursue the Federals because he was short of ammunition. The Confederates claimed victory. Chief Opothleyahola and his band moved off in search of security elsewhere. Their loss was estimated by Cooper as 500 (some accounts suggest 412). Confederate casualties were 15 killed and 37 wounded.

== Battle of Chustenahlah ==
The third and final engagement, the Battle of Chustenahlah occurred on December 26, 1861, near Skiatook, Oklahoma. Colonels James M. McIntosh and Cooper planned a combined attack with each of their columns moving on the camp from different directions. McIntosh left Fort Gibson on December 22, with 1,380 men. On December 25, he was informed that Cooper's force could not join him for a while, but he decided to attack the next day, despite being outnumbered and severe cold weather conditions. McIntosh assaulted the camp at noon. The 1,700 pro-Union defenders were secluded in the underbrush along the slope of a rugged hill. McIntosh devised a plan to converge on the crest, with the South Kansas-Texas Cavalry (also known as the 3rd Texas) ordered to charge directly up the steep bluff on foot. The 11th Texas advanced to their left using a defile for concealment, while the 6th Texas circled to the right. As the Confederate attack progressed, the Native Americans began to fall back, taking cover for a while and then moving back. The retreat became a rout as the Federals reached their camp. The Indians attempted to make a stand there but were forced away again by 4:00 p.m. The survivors fled; many went all the way to Kansas where they found loyal Unionists. Three hundred Cherokees under Col. Stand Watie intercepted the fleeing Creeks and Seminoles, killing 15 of them. Sonuk Mikko's band of Seminole Indians covered the rear after the battle against Cherokee chief Stand Watie.

== Aftermath ==
Chief Opothleyahola's band mounted no further resistance, and nearly 2,000 of them died on or shortly after the trek to Fort Row, Kansas, mostly due to exposure and disease. Survivors eventually settled near Fort Belmont, where more members died of exposure and starvation during the winter. Many made their way to other parts of eastern Kansas such as LeRoy's post and formed the First Indian Home Guard.
