= Skiatook Public Schools =

School district in Skiatook, Oklahoma

Skiatook Intermediate Elementary, September 2026

Skiatook Public Schools is a school district headquartered in Skiatook, Oklahoma.

It operates five schools: Marrs Elementary, Skiatook Elementary, Skiatook Intermediate Elementary, Newman Middle School, and Skiatook High School.

Skiatook Schools Field House, September 2026

Within Tulsa County, the district includes most of Skiatook. It also includes all of Skiatook in Osage County.

As of 2022, the school has Osage language as a class for world languages.

== History ==
Rick Thomas became the superintendent in 2011.

In 2019, the district enacted a strategic plan.

Rick Thomas was superintendent until July 1, 2022, when he retired. Melissa Bush became the new superintendent on July 1, 2022. Bush, who originated from Skiatook, continued the strategic plan.
