= Fort Belmont =

- southern Woodson County, Kansas

Site information
- Type: local militia fort
- Controlled by: Cos. C and G, 16th Kansas (all local militia)

Location
- Coordinates: 37°49′53″N 95°47′17″W

Site history
- Built: ca. 1860
- In use: ca. 1860 - October 1864 or later
- Materials: wood, earth

Garrison information
- Past commanders: Capt. Joseph Gunby
- Garrison: same

Fort Belmont, in southern Woodson County, Kansas, was built about 1860 near the town of Belmont. It was to protect the settlers there from attacks by Border Ruffians and Indians. The fort consisted of three or four officer cabins, a redoubt about a quarter of a mile to the north and a parade ground a mile to the east.

The redoubt was an earthwork and log structure. Historian Daniel C. Fitzgerald visited the ruins of the redoubt and reported it to be rectangular, 150 feet by 60 feet across. The earthworks were the base of the structure. On top of the earthworks were four layers of logs. The wall was said to be fairly high. A house was built in the center of the redoubt.

Fort Belmont was manned by local militia under the command of Capt. Joseph Gunby. A Federal agency for the Osage and Creek Indians was located at Fort Belmont until 1864, possibly until October. In 1861 Creek Indian leader Opothleyahola led around 10,000 followers to Kansas to escape the pursuit of Confederates in present-day Oklahoma. Little protection was offered to them at Fort Row in Wilson County, so the survivors were moved to Fort Belmont where more than 240 refugees died during the winter of 1861/62 when the Union army was unable to provide sufficient food and shelter; their unmarked graves, including those of Opotheleyahola and his daughter, are nearby. On October 30, 1864, Gov. Thomas Carney relieved the militia from duty and Fort Belmont was permanently closed. The town of Belmont was abandoned soon thereafter.

== See also ==
- Fort de la Montagne aka Fort Belmont
