= Fort Row =

- Fort Row
- Wilson County, Kansas, United States

Site information
- Type: fort

Site history
- In use: 1861–1862
- Events: Trail of Blood on Ice

Fort Row, located on the south bank of the Verdigris River and east of the present town of Coyville, Kansas, was built in the fall of 1861, probably in October. It was built by the local mounted militia for their use. However, the fort became associated with one of the worst human tragedies of the Civil War.

The militia was formed in summer 1861 to defend the area against raids by Confederate guerrillas who operated in eastern Kansas. John R. Row, for whom the fort was named, was chosen as the militia's captain. The militia had seventy to eighty men when it was organized.

Fort Row was built in a very flat area allowing for a good view of the surrounding land. The river provided a good barrier, as the bank was very steep. Three log blockhouses were built, measuring sixteen by twenty-four feet each. A six-foot log stockade surrounded three sides, with the river side being protected by the steep bank. An earthwork embankment was built along the stockade and rifle portholes were cut into the stockade walls. The stockade enclosed about a half acre of land.

The militia members stayed in the fort for the winter, keeping their horses inside the stockade. In the spring they abandoned Fort Row, when they joined the 9th Kansas Volunteers. Fort Row, however, is more well known for the fate of about 10,000 destitute Indians who arrived there in January 1862 seeking help to survive the harsh winter.

Creek Indian leader Opothleyahola had a following of 12,000 to 13,000 in Indian Territory. Confederate leaders hoped he would join them, but he sought to keep his people on neutral ground and avoid the conflict of the Civil War. His plan for neutrality failed and in late 1861 the Creeks under him (defections to the Confederates cut his followers to about 9,000) and at least 2,600 Indians of other tribes headed for Fort Row.

The Indians fought Confederate forces twice, on December 26 suffering a devastating defeat forcing Opothleyahola's people to flee with next to nothing. Many were shoeless and many were naked or nearly so. They had no food and were forced to march 100 to 150 miles through snow and bitter cold before reaching Fort Row. The Creeks lost 2,000 to 3,000 on the way and more would have died, had they not eaten some of their dogs and ponies. The Indians expected help, but their numbers completely overwhelmed all efforts to help them.

In the middle of January 1862 the first groups of Indians, more than 2,000, arrived at the fort. Twenty to sixty Indians arrived per day until approximately 10,000 had arrived. In late January or early February, William G. Coffin, the regional superintendent for Indian affairs, arrived to help. He spent $10,000 for supplies, which quickly ran out. He managed to use credit to get more supplies and he and his son Oliver, who was assisting him, used their salaries to buy more goods.

At first the Army helped feed the Indians, but Coffin inherited the task of feeding the Indians by February. He obtained some help, which was still completely inadequate. Physicians attempted to help the starving and Indians and had to amputate many frostbitten limbs. The Indians attempted to hunt game, which was quickly depleted. Thousands of ponies and dogs died from starvation and lack of shelter and many of the dogs and ponies were eaten. At least 1,000 Indians died, including Opthleyahola's daughter, who died at Belmont, Kansas.

Many of the dead Indians were placed into hollow logs and trees. Since the ground was frozen, those who were buried were put into shallow graves hacked out of the ground. Probably most of the human and animal dead were never buried. When the weather warmed, a terrible stench hung in the air.

To alleviate the suffering, the Indians were over time moved to Fort Belmont and a U.S. Army post at LeRoy, Kansas (see LeRoy's post). Conditions were still harsh at Fort Belmont. A number of young Indian men were enlisted to fight for the Union from all three posts.

By the time Fort Row was abandoned in the spring, all the Indians had been moved elsewhere. Fort Row was never again used and eventually the buildings were destroyed by floods. For many years human and animal bones littered the surrounding countryside.
