= Sonuk Mikko =

Seminole Union Army officer of the American Civil War (died 1863/1864)

Sonuk Mikko (unknown—ca. 1864), commonly known as Billy Bowlegs and also known as So-Nuk-Mek-Ko, was a Seminole who gained recognition as a captain in the American Civil War. Mikko adopted the name of Chief Billy Bowlegs from Holato Micco, who had fought in the Second and Third Seminole Wars, following Holato Micco's death in 1859.

== Civil War ==
With the secession of eleven Southern states in 1861, both the Union and Confederacy vied for control of the Indian Territory. Old tribal rivalries were renewed, with some aligning with the North and others with the South. Sonuk Mikko sided with the Union. When a Confederate force under Colonel Douglas H. Cooper attacked Unionist tribes in the Indian Territory, Mikko aligned his followers with Opothleyahola's Upper Creeks and resisted. Together, they fought Cooper in a series of losing battles in the winter of 1861–62 that led to the withdrawal of the Union sympathizers to Kansas in a bitter trek known as the "Trail of Blood on Ice." Mikko's band covered the rear after the Battle of Chustenahlah against Cherokee chief Stand Watie. They eventually settled near Fort Belmont, where a number of his Seminoles perished of exposure and starvation during the winter.

Mikko formally enlisted in the Union Army as a captain in May 1862 and was assigned command of Company A of the First Indian Home Guards. He saw action in a number of battles that year and was commended by Colonel William Cloud, commander of the Third Brigade, Army of the Frontier, for his actions at the Battle of Cane Hill in December. The First Indian Home Guards arrived on the battlefield, dismounted, and entered a patch of woods on the left-center, flanked by two white regiments from Kansas and Iowa. When the Iowans gave way under a heavy volley, the entire Union line wavered and fell back. Rallying, the Indians and Kansans pushed forward and gained the position. Colonel Cloud wrote, "Of the Indian officers, Captain Jon-neh, of the Uches, and Captain Billy Bowlegs, of the Seminoles, and Captain Tus-te-nup-chup-ko, of Company A (Creek), are deserving of the highest praise."

Eventually being reassigned to command of Company F, Billy Bowlegs remained prominent in the fighting in Kansas and Indian Territory. At a skirmish with Confederates at Rhea Mills, he lost two revolvers, saddle, bridle and his horse, but emerged unscathed. During another skirmish on June 17, 1863, on the Greenleaf Prairie, Mikko lead 75 men to flank the enemy Confederate force and was able to push them back until they ran out of ammunition and were forced to return to Fort Gibson, where they were garrisoned.

Mikko died sometime between September 1863 and March 1864 of smallpox and was buried in the Fort Gibson National Cemetery. Indian Agent G.C. Snow lamented, "His loss is very much regretted, as he was an influential man among (the Seminoles) and I believe generally beloved by all."

== See also ==
- Seminole tribe
