= Douglas H. Cooper =

American politician

Douglas Hancock Cooper
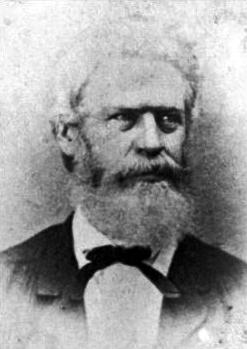
- Born: November 1, 1815; Amite County, Mississippi
- Died: April 29, 1879 (aged 63); Fort Washita, Indian Territory
- Burial place: Fort Washita Post Cemetery
- Military career
- Allegiance: United States of America; Confederate States of America
- Branch: United States Army; Confederate States Army
- Service years: 1846–48 (USA); 1861–65 (CSA)
- Rank: Captain (US Army); Brigadier General (CS Army)
- Units: Regiment of Mississippi Rifles, USV
- Commands: 1st Choctaw and Chickasaw Mounted Rifles; Indian Territory; Bureau of Indian Affairs
- Conflicts: Mexican–American War -Battle of Monterrey -Battle of Buena Vista; American Civil War: Battle of Round Mountain; Battle of Chusto-Talasah; Battle of Chustenahlah; Battle of Elkhorn Tavern; First Battle of Newtonia; Battle of Old Fort Wayne; Battle of Honey Springs; Battle of Fort Smith

Douglas Hancock Cooper (November 1, 1815 – April 29, 1879) was an American politician, soldier, Indian Agent in what is now Oklahoma, and Confederate general during the American Civil War.

== Early life and career ==
Cooper was born November 1, 1815, most likely in Amite County, Mississippi. (Note: The Encyclopedia of Oklahoma History and Culture says that Cooper was born in Wilkinson County, Mississippi) His father, David Cooper, was a medical doctor and Baptist minister. His mother was Sarah Davenport. Cooper attended the University of Virginia from 1832 until 1834; his classmates included future Civil War generals Carnot Posey, Lafayette McLaws, and John B. Magruder.

Cooper returned home to operate "Mon Clova", his plantation in Wilkinson County, Mississippi. It was in Cold Springs, a tiny village between Woodville and Natchez. He married Mary Collins of Natchez and they had 7 children together.

== Political career ==
Entering politics, Cooper represented Wilkinson County as a Whig in the Mississippi House of Representatives from 1842 to 1844.

Cooper supported the Mexican–American War; with many other Southerners, he believed that the US could gain territory for the expansion of slavery. He helped to raise a regiment, the 1st Mississippi Rifles. He served as a captain under the command of Colonel Jefferson Davis, participating in the battles of Monterrey and Buena Vista. He was cited for bravery and gallantry at the Battle of Monterrey.

In 1853, through the influence of Jefferson Davis, who had been appointed as Secretary of War, President Franklin Pierce appointed Cooper as the Federal Indian agent to the Choctaw tribe, most of whom had been removed to Indian Territory from 1831 to 1833. They settled in the Unassigned Lands. Three years later, he also was appointed as Indian agent to the Chickasaw tribe, also removed from Mississippi to Indian Territory. The Chickasaw respected and trusted Cooper, and officially adopted him into a family as a full member of the tribe.

In 1858, Cooper led a militia composed of Choctaw and Chickasaw volunteers against Comanche marauders in the territory.

Prior to the Civil War, General Cooper was also a slave owner, holding eleven enslaved people in 1860 when he resided in the Tishomingo area of the Chickasaw Nation. After the Treaty of 1866 was signed abolishing slavery in the Chickasaw Nation, the people General Cooper enslaved were granted their freedom. Their descendants are still in Oklahoma and have been hosting family reunions for over 140 years.

== Civil War ==
With the outbreak of the Civil War in 1861, Cooper pledged his allegiance to the Confederacy. In May, Secretary of War Leroy Pope Walker sent Cooper a letter authorizing him to "take measures to secure the protection of these tribes in their present country from the agrarian rapacity of the North." He raised a regiment known as the 1st Choctaw and Chickasaw Mounted Rifles and was commissioned as its colonel. Given brigade command, Cooper pursued the Creek Indian leader Opothleyahola in November and December, when the latter led his loyal Union followers toward Kansas. Cooper's brigade fought at the battles of Round Mountain and Chusto-Talasah, winning a decisive victory at Chustenahlah.

In 1862, Cooper led Confederate troops at the battles of Elkhorn Tavern, Newtonia and Honey Springs. He was promoted to brigadier general on May 2, 1862, and was named district commander of the Indian Territory on September 29, 1862. This promotion put him in command of all "... (Confederate) Indian troops in the Trans-Mississippi Department on the borders of Arkansas." Rumors circulated that the Indians were dissatisfied with Cooper. To refute this, letters of support from Indian leaders were sent to Richmond, Virginia, to President Jefferson Davis. Cooper commanded the "Indian Brigade" in Indian Territory during Maj. Gen. Sterling Price's second invasion of Missouri in 1864. In 1865, Cooper was appointed Superintendent of the Bureau of Indian Affairs.

The Confederacy's collapse accelerated after General Robert E. Lee's surrender at Appomattox in 1865. The Choctaw and Chickasaw tribes surrendered in April 1865, and their troops returned home immediately. Cooper ordered the surrender of all white Confederate troops in Indian Territory in June, 1865. Afterward, he swore allegiance to the United States government, and was formally pardoned in April, 1866.

== Postbellum activities ==
After the war, Cooper continued to live in the Indian Territory and was an ardent supporter of Choctaw and Chickasaw land claims against the Federal government. He died of pneumonia on April 29, 1879, at Fort Washita (in what is now Bryan County, Oklahoma) and was buried in the old fort cemetery in an unmarked grave.

== See also ==
- List of American Civil War generals (Confederate)
