= Opothleyahola =

Muscogee Creek chief (d. 1863)

Opothle Yahola
- Hopere Yahvlv
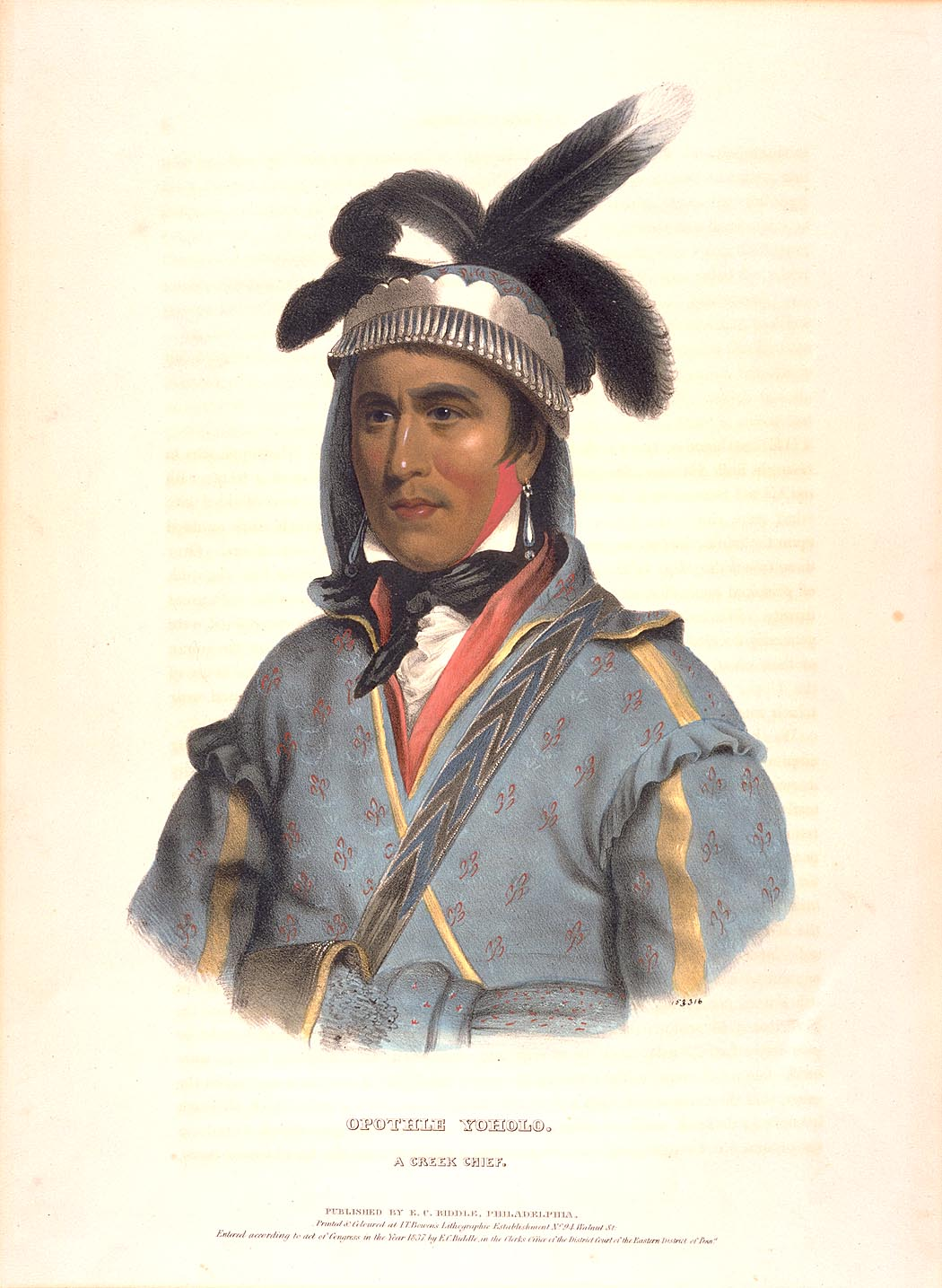
- Born: c. 1778; Tuckabatchee town (Elmore County, Alabama)
- Died: March 22, 1863 (aged 85); Quenemo in Osage County, Kansas
- Resting place: Near Fort Belmont in Woodson County, Kansas
- Other name: Laughing Fox
- Occupation: Mico/Diplomatic Chief

Opothleyahola (Creek: Hopere Yahvlv; c. 1778 – March 22, 1863) (Note: Also spelled Opothle Yohola, Opothleyoholo, Hu-pui-hilth Yahola, Hopoeitheyohola) was a Muscogee Creek Indian chief, noted as a brilliant orator. He was a Speaker of the Upper Creek Council and supported traditional culture.

Although known as a diplomatic chief, as a Red Stick traditionalist he led Creek forces against the United States government during the Creek Wars. Later he tried to overturn the Treaty of Indian Springs, but was forced to make a new treaty with the federal government in 1832. He was commissioned as a colonel and led forces against remaining Lower Creek and the Seminole in Florida in the first two wars of the US against them. Despite his efforts, he and his people were among the Seminole and others forced to remove to Indian Territory in 1836, where they settled in the Unassigned Lands.

During the American Civil War, Opothleyahola was among the minority of Creek in Indian Territory who supported the Union. Because of rising conflict within the tribe, he led his followers to Kansas as a refuge. They engaged in three battles against the opposition along the way. Their journey became known as the Trail of Blood on Ice, because the people suffered harsh conditions. Some people were housed at a federal fort, others in refugee camps in Kansas. All suffered from inadequate supplies, disease, and harsh winters. Opothleyahola died during the war at one of the refugee camps in Kansas.

== Early life and education ==
Opothleyahola was born circa 1780 at Tuckabatchee, the Creek capital of the Upper Creek Towns, located in present-day Elmore County, Alabama just below the falls of the Tallapoosa River below Tallassee. The Upper Creeks comprised the majority of the nation. His name literally translated means 'child', 'good', 'whooper' or 'good speaker'. Langguth says the name could be translated as "...good shouting child."

According to the Encyclopedia of Oklahoma History, his father was Davy Cornell, a mixed-blood Creek, and his mother was a full-blood Creek; her name is not known. The historian Angie Debo found evidence suggesting that the boy's father was David Evans, a trader of Welsh descent. He may have taught him English and literacy, or sent him to a European-American school.

While Opothleyahola was of European and Creek ancestry, he was born to a Creek mother, and thus considered part of her clan and the tribe by birth, and reared as Creek. The Creek had a matrilineal kinship system of property holding and descent, and the mother's family and clan determined the status of her children. Traditionally, her brothers were more important in rearing the children than was the biological father. For instance, a maternal uncle would teach a boy men's roles, and introduce him to men's societies.

== Politics ==
Under pressure from European Americans, Lower Creek leaders had made treaties with the state of Georgia to cede former hunting lands in 1790, 1802 and 1804. The Lower Creek had long had more interaction with European Americans, who had come as traders and settlers since the colonial period. The Creek had already lost use of the land for hunting because of settler encroachment. They began to adopt more farming practices in order to survive. Under pressure from Georgia and its settlers, they also had more relationship with Benjamin Hawkins, the US Indian agent of the Southeast.

The tensions between the Upper Creek and Lower Creek broke out into violence in 1812 in what was at first a civil war. The Red Sticks of the Upper Creek wanted to revive traditional culture and religion, and resisted assimilation, as well as the land cessions. Opothleyahola is believed to have allied with the British against the US forces as early as the War of 1812.

He was among the Red Sticks in the Creek War of 1813–1814. This ended with defeat by General Andrew Jackson, who commanded a large allied force, including Lower Creek, at the Battle of Horseshoe Bend. After the defeat, Opothleyahola swore his allegiance to the Federal government.

== Leader of the Creek ==
Later the young man developed as an influential and eloquent speaker. He was selected to the role as Speaker for the chiefs, which was a distinct position on the National Council. He later became a "diplomatic chief."

Opothleyahola also became a wealthy trader and owned a 2,000-acre (8 km^{2}) cotton plantation near North Fork Town. As did other Creek and members of the Five Civilized Tribes, he purchased and held enslaved African Americans as workers for his plantation. In other adaptations to European-American culture, Opothleyahola joined the Freemasons and accepted Christianity, becoming a Baptist.

Alarmed by the land cessions made by chiefs of the Lower Towns without tribal consensus, the National Council of the Creek Confederacy enacted a law that made further land cessions by tribal members a capital offense. In 1825, William McIntosh and several Lower Creek chiefs signed the second Treaty of Indian Springs with the US, by which they gave up most of the remaining Creek lands in Georgia in exchange for payment and removal to lands west of the Mississippi River. By then, McIntosh and others of the Treaty Party believed that removal was inevitable, given the increasing numbers of European-American settlers entering their region, and they wanted to get the best deal possible for the Creek Nation.

But the National Council had not given up on trying to resist United States encroachment. It passed a death sentence, supported by Opothleyahola, against McIntosh and other signatories of the 1825 Treaty. The chief Menawa led 200 warriors to attack McIntosh at his plantation. They killed him and another signatory chief, and burned down McIntosh's mansion.

The Creek elders realized that they would need experienced negotiators to present their case to Federal authorities. While Opothleyahola was a persuasive speaker, he was not fluent in the English language. They turned to the Cherokee for assistance. Major Ridge, a Cherokee leader, recommended that the Creek retain his son, John Ridge, and David Vann, who were well-educated young men fluent in English, to travel with Opothleyahola and help prepare his negotiating positions.

The Creek National Council, led by Opothleyahola, went to Washington, D.C., to protest the illegality of the 1825 treaty, saying its signatories did not have consensus of the council. President John Quincy Adams was sympathetic. The US government and the chiefs made a new treaty with more favorable terms, the Treaty of Washington (1826).

But Georgia officials began forcibly removing the Indians from lands it claimed under the 1825 treaty. In addition, the state ignored the 1832 US Supreme Court ruling in Worcester v. Georgia, which said that the state's legislation to regulate activities within American Indian territories was unconstitutional.

When the Alabama legislature also acted to abolish tribal governments and extend state laws over the Creek people, Opothleyahola appealed to the administration of President Andrew Jackson. But he had already signed the 1830 Indian Removal Act and wanted the Creek and other tribes to move west, to extinguish their land titles in the east. Given no relief, the Upper Creek signed the Treaty of Cusseta on March 24, 1832, which divided Creek lands into individual allotments. They could either sell their allotments and receive funds to remove to Indian Territory, or stay in Alabama as state and US citizens and submit to the state laws.

In 1834, Opothleyahola traveled to Nacogdoches, Texas, to try to purchase communal land for his people. After he had paid landowners $20,000, pressure from both the Mexican and American governments forced Opothleyahola to abandon the idea.

In 1836, Opothleyahola, commissioned as a colonel by the U.S. government, led 1,500 of his warriors against remaining rebellious Lower Creek, who had allied with Seminole in Florida in fighting European-American occupation. Soon after, the US Army rounded up the remaining Creek and other Southeast Indian peoples and forced their emigration to Indian Territory, on what was known as the "Trail of Tears."

In 1837, Opothleyahola led 8,000 of his people from Alabama to lands north of the Canadian River in the Indian Territory, what were then called Unassigned Lands. (It is now part of the state of Oklahoma). Over time, they began to specialize in stock raising and grain production there, as neither the land nor climate were suitable for subsistence farming.

== Civil War ==
At the outbreak of the American Civil War, Opothleyahola and Creek remained loyal to the federal government. They believed the Southern populations in Georgia and Alabama had forced their removal. The Lower Creek and some of the other of the Southeastern tribes, who had specialized in cotton production, held numerous slaves and had more cultural contacts with white settlers. They supported the Confederacy, which promised them an Indian-controlled state if they won the war. Tensions within the Creek Nation increased during this period because the Confederacy tried to convince it and other Indian nations to tighten slave codes in Indian Territory.

Those Creek with African ancestry resented the restrictions of proposed "black codes," and became more affiliated toward the Union. Refugee enslaved African Americans, free people of color, Chickasaw and Seminole Indians also began gathering at Opothleyahola's plantation. They hoped to remain neutral in the conflict between the North and South.

On August 15, 1861, Opothleyahola and tribal chief Micco Hutko contacted President Abraham Lincoln to request help for the loyalists. On September 10, they received a positive response, saying that the United States government would assist them. The letter directed Opothleyahola to move his people to Fort Row in Wilson County, Kansas, where they would receive asylum and aid.

On November 15, Confederate Col. Douglas H. Cooper, a former US Indian Agent, led 1,400 men, including pro-Confederate Indians, northward; he intended either to convince Opothleyahola and his followers to support the Confederacy or to "drive him and his party from the country." Believing Federal promises of assistance, Opothleyahola led his band (including Seminole under Halleck Tustenuggee) toward Kansas. Along the way, they had to fight three battles against their pursuers, and had lost many of their goods in their quick departure. At Round Mountain, Opothleyahola's forces drove back the Confederates to Fort Gibson.

In December, the loyalists suffered a tactical loss at Chusto-Talasah and a crushing defeat at the Battle of Chustenahlah. He lost an estimated 2,000 of his 9,000 followers from the battles, disease, and bitter winter blizzards during their ill-fated trek to Fort Row. The fort had been unable to get extra supplies, and lacked adequate medical support and supplies to care for the refugees. The Creek were forced to move to Fort Belmont, but conditions were still very poor. The majority of the Creek had only the clothes on their backs and lacked proper footwear and shelter, as they had left in a hurry. Many Creek died that winter, among them Opothleyahola's daughter.

Conditions for the Creek in Kansas continued to be very harsh. Opothleyahola died in the Creek refugee camp near the Sac and Fox Agency at Quenemo in Osage County, Kansas, on March 22, 1863. He was buried beside his daughter near Fort Belmont in Woodson County, Kansas.
