= William Bradford (soldier, born 1771) =

American politician

William Bradford (born in Virginia in 1771, died at Fort Towson, Oklahoma on October 20, 1826) was a commissioned officer in the United States Army during the War of 1812 and the period after the war. He is best known for having supervised the construction of the first Fort Smith on what was to become the western boundary of Arkansas Territory in 1817–1818. He served as commander of the new fort from 1818 until February 1822.

== Biography ==
William Bradford was born in Virginia in 1771. He moved to Kentucky at an unknown date. Settling in Muhlenberg County in 1799, he became a local leader. He won distinctions that included a commission as deputy sheriff, a captaincy in the county militia, and was elected four times to the Kentucky House of Representatives.

During the period of hostilities that immediately preceded the War of 1812, Bradford was commissioned in the U.S. Army as a captain. He fought against the British and Native Americans in Ohio, and was wounded at Fort Meigs. He continued his Army service after the war and was promoted to major.

As a major, Bradford was selected by General Andrew Jackson in fall 1817 to lead a column of rifle regulars up the Arkansas River to a strategic riverfront strongpoint, Belle Point, where the river crossed what was then the Osage Boundary. This location was deep, at that time, into frontier country.

Bradford and 64 men arrived at Belle Point on December 25, 1817, and began to raise a stockade. The fortification became the first Fort Smith on the banks of the Arkansas River. Major Bradford served as the fort commander, and thus as the senior U.S. military officer in what was to become western Arkansas Territory, from December 1817 until his relief in February 1822. Age 50, Major Bradford then entered a retirement-oriented career pathway. It included honors such as his brief appointment, in 1823, as brigadier general of the Arkansas territorial militia. He is usually referred to by his Regular Army rank of major. When he laid down his commissions in 1824, his pension was only $15 per month. The retired major followed the Army to Fort Towson in Indian Territory, a post on the Red River, where he served as a civilian post sutler. The Red River post was afflicted by wetland health conditions, and in October 1826 the sutler fell ill with yellow fever. He died on October 20, and was buried as one of the senior persons interred at Fort Smith National Cemetery.

== Today ==
The first Fort Smith was abandoned in 1824 in favor of Fort Gibson, Indian Territory. The foundations of the first Fort Smith survived, however, and are marked within the overall boundaries of the Fort Smith National Historic Site. National Park Service signage describes the work of Major Bradford and his men in their construction of the stockade.
