= Fort Smith National Cemetery =

Historic veterans cemetery in Sebastian County, Arkansas

- U.S. National Register of Historic Places
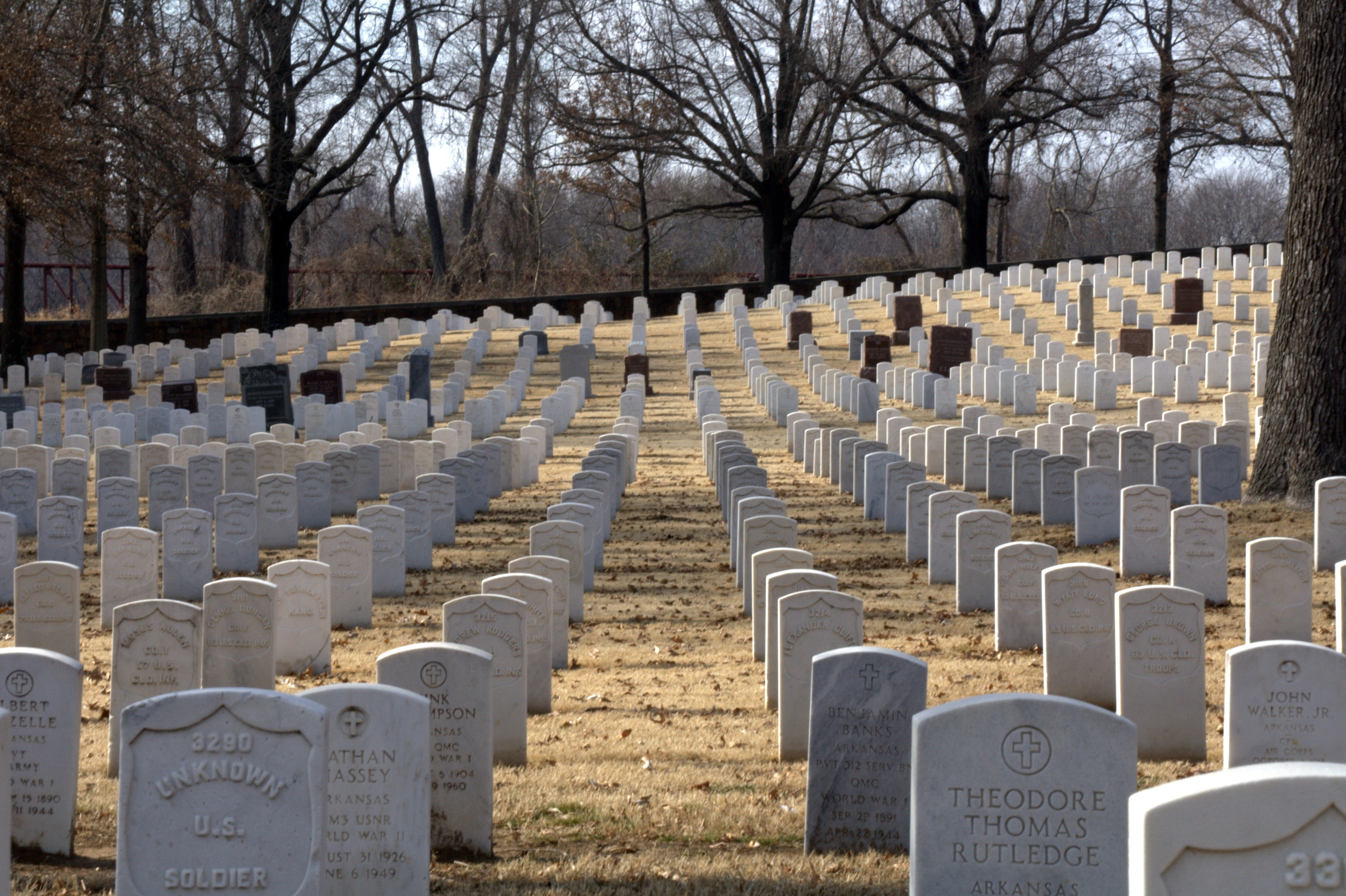
- Fort Smith National Cemetery in 2011

- Location within Arkansas Location within the United States
- Location: 522 Garland Ave. and S. 6th St., Fort Smith, Arkansas
- Coordinates: 35°22′57″N 94°25′43″W
- Area: 21.7 acres (8.8 ha)
- Built: 1867
- MPS: Civil War Era National Cemeteries MPS
- NRHP reference No.: 99000578
- Added to NRHP: May 20, 1999

Fort Smith National Cemetery is a United States National Cemetery located at Garland Avenue and Sixth Street in Fort Smith, Sebastian County, Arkansas. It encompasses 22.3 acres (9.0 ha), and as of the end of 2005, had 13,127 interments.

== History ==
Fort Smith was a frontier fort first established in 1817, by Maj. William Bradford as a post to prevent hostilities between the Cherokees and the Osage. Despite the strategic importance of the post, the army closed it after a severe outbreak of disease which had taken the lives of several of the men stationed there by 1824. The initial interments were made in the area during this time.

In 1838, a new fort was constructed on the site, including an officer's quarters where General Zachary Taylor lived from 1841 until 1845. At this time, the original post cemetery was repaired, expanded, and improved.

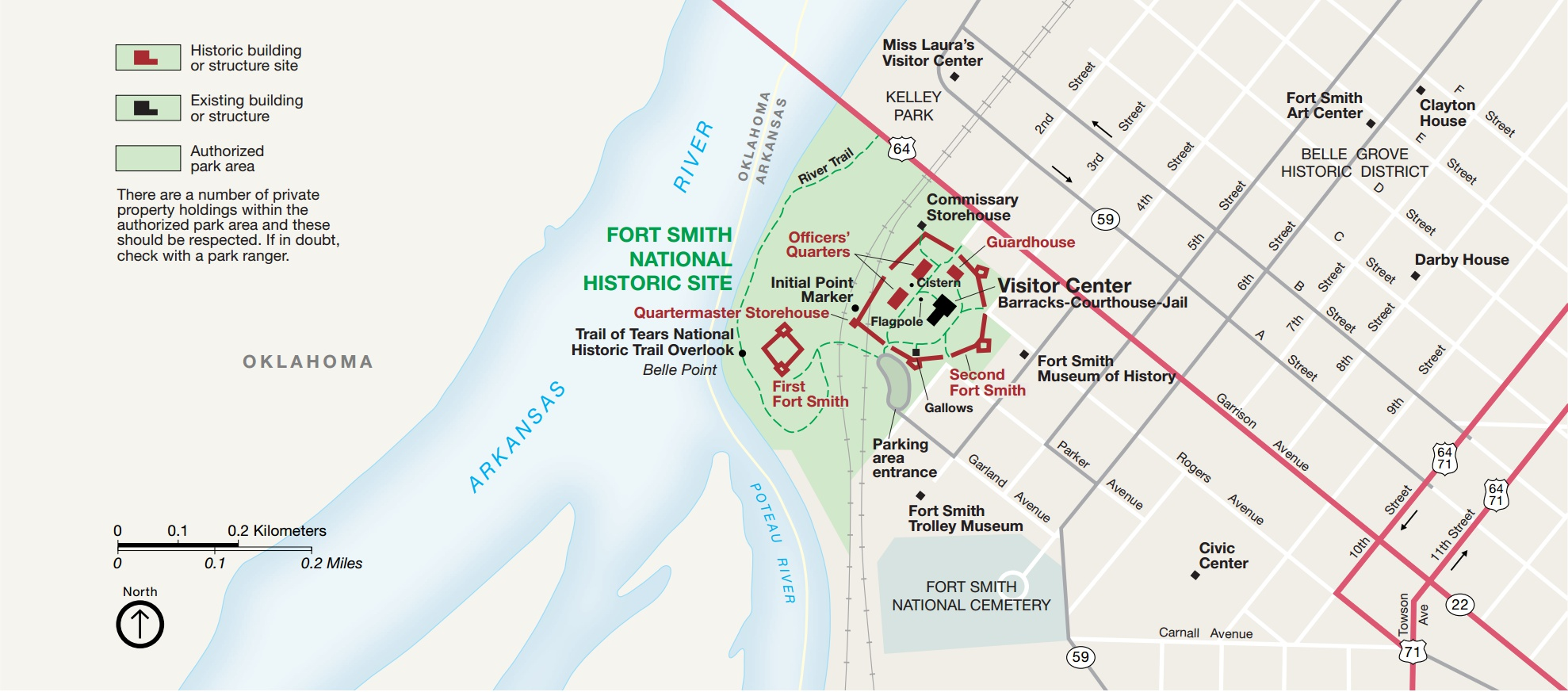
Fort Smith National Cemetery is in western Fort Smith, Arkansas, south of Fort Smith National Historic Site

On April 23, 1861, as the American Civil War was beginning, the post was abandoned by the U.S. Army forces stationed there; it was then subsequently occupied by a Confederate garrison. During this occupation, nearly 400 Confederate soldiers died and were buried at the fort's cemetery. On September 1, 1863, the fort was then retaken by Union forces. In 1867, the post cemetery officially became a National Cemetery when many of the remains from soldiers who had been interred on nearby battlefields were exhumed and reinterred at Fort Smith. The cemetery includes more than 1,400 unmarked graves, many of them of Union and Confederate soldiers.

== Noteworthy monuments ==
- A memorial to Unknown Confederate Dead, made of marble. It also commemorates Brigadier General James M. McIntosh, who died at the Battle of Pea Ridge and Brigadier General Alexander E. Steen, who was killed at the Battle of Prairie Grove.
- A Vietnam Veterans memorial, constructed of granite and bronze, erected in 1998.

== Notable interments ==
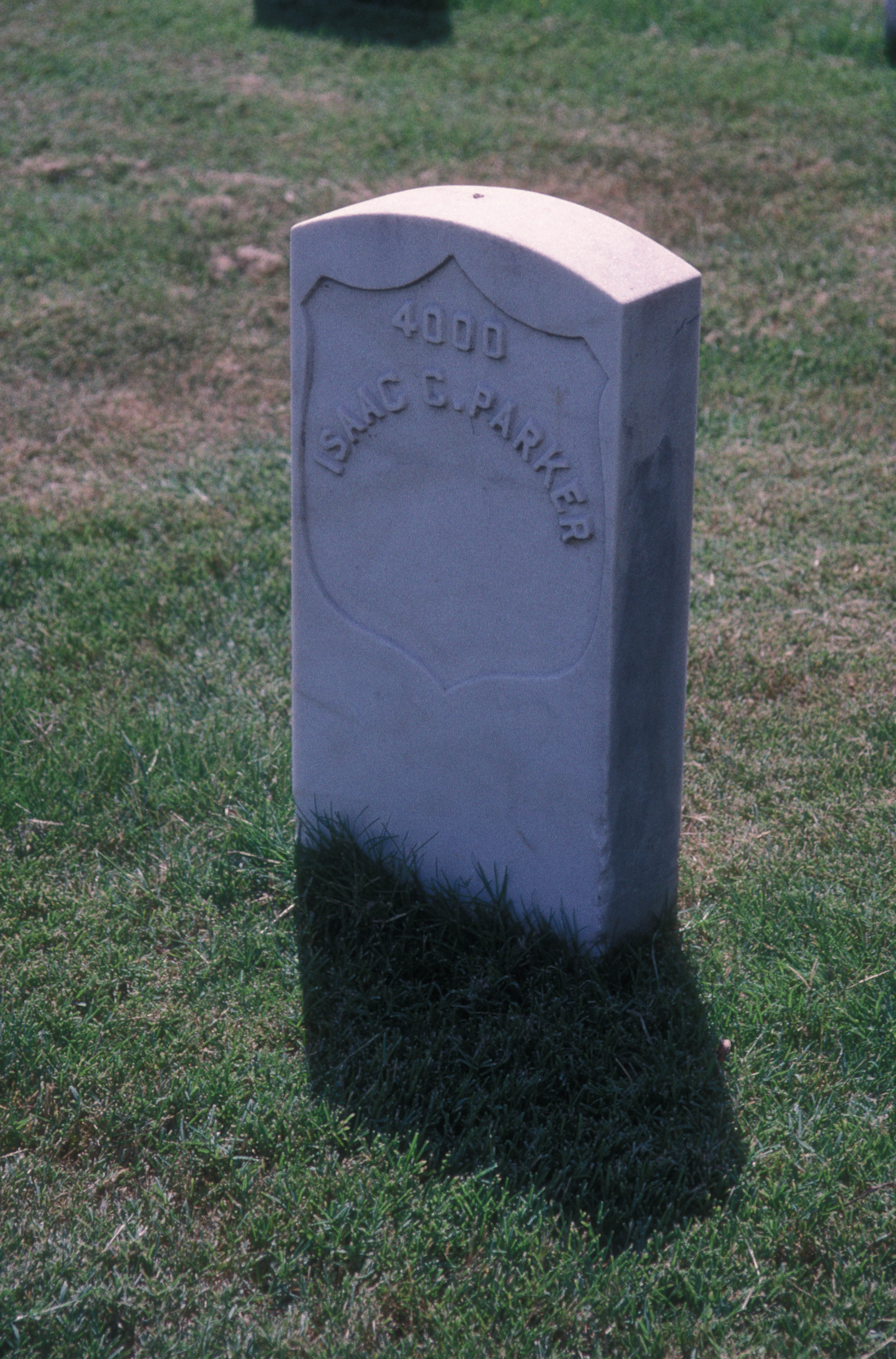
Grave of Isaac C. Parker, the "Hanging Judge"

- W. H. H. Clayton (1840–1920), lawyer and judge in post-Civil War Arkansas
- Brigadier General William Orlando Darby (1911–1945 †), World War II veteran, leader of Darby's Rangers
- Jack Fleck (1921–2014), World War II Navy veteran and professional golfer
- Richard C. Gatlin (1809–1896), Civil War Confederate general
- James M. McIntosh (1828–1862 †), Civil War Confederate brigadier general
- Isaac C. Parker (1838–1896), U.S. representative, frontier judge known as "The Hanging Judge"
- Hal Smith (1931–2014), United States Air Force veteran and MLB catcher
- Alexander E. Steen (1827–1862 †), Missouri State Guard (Confederate) general

== See also ==
- National Register of Historic Places listings in Sebastian County, Arkansas
- List of cemeteries in Arkansas
