= James M. McIntosh =

American soldier

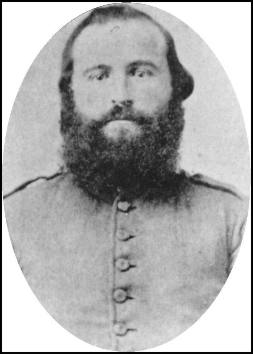
- James M. McIntosh
- Born: c. 1828; Fort Brooke, Florida Territory
- Died: March 7, 1862 (aged 33–34); Benton County, Arkansas
- Burial place: Fort Smith National Cemetery
- Relatives: Great-great-nephew of Lachlan McIntosh Union Army General John Baillie McIntosh
- Military career
- Allegiance: United States of America; Confederate States of America
- Branch: United States Army; Confederate States Army
- Service years: 1849–1861 (USA); 1861–1862 (CSA)
- Rank: Captain (USA); Brigadier General (CSA)
- Commands: McIntosh's Cavalry Brigade
- Conflicts: American Civil War: Wilson's Creek; Chustenahlah; Pea Ridge †

James McQueen McIntosh (c. 1828 – March 7, 1862) was a career American soldier who served as a brigadier general in the Confederate Army during the Civil War. Noted as an aggressive and popular leader of cavalry, he was killed in action at the Battle of Pea Ridge.

== Birth and early years ==
McIntosh was born at Fort Brooke (at today's Tampa), Florida Territory, while his Georgia-born father was on active duty in the U.S. Army. His younger brother was future Union general John Baillie McIntosh. They were descended from a Revolutionary War commander, and their great-great uncle was General Lachlan McIntosh. Their father, a colonel, was killed in action during the Battle of Molino del Rey.

== Military career ==
James McIntosh received an appointment in 1845 to the United States Military Academy on the Hudson River at West Point, New York, but proved to be a poor student and graduated last in his Class of 1849. He first served in the infantry as a second lieutenant before transferring to the cavalry and serving on the Western frontier. He was stationed at Fort Smith on the western border of Arkansas with the adjacent Indian Territory when several southern states, including his native Florida, began seceding from the Union in early 1861 and forming a separate government of the new Confederate States of America.

With the outbreak of the Civil War, McIntosh resigned his U.S. Army commission and joined the Confederate cause and the newly-formed Confederate States Army as colonel of the 2nd Arkansas Mounted Rifles. He first saw combat action in the August 1861 at the Battle of Wilson's Creek, further east near the state's third largest town of Springfield, Missouri, the first major conflict in the far-western Trans-Mississippi Theater of the War. Although he was courageous and daring, young Colonel McIntosh was also impulsive and reckless, preferring to lead his men from the front instead of concentrating on the duties of a brigade commander.

In the late autumn of 1861, Confederate troops undertook a campaign to subdue the Native American Union sympathizers in adjacent to the west of the Indian Territory and consolidate Southern control. Colonel Douglas H. Cooper (1815-1879), commanding the C.S. Army's Indian Department, planned a coordinated attack with McIntosh on the enemy camp at the Battle of Chustenahlah. McIntosh left Fort Gibson on December 22, with 1,380 men under arms. On Christmas Day, he learned that Col. Cooper’s force was delayed, but he decided to attack the next day anyway, despite being outnumbered. McIntosh assaulted the natives' camp at noon on the 26th, utterly routing Chief Opothleyahola’s band of Creeks and Seminoles. McIntosh received a subsequent promotion to the rank of brigadier general in January 1862.

== Death and burial ==
At the Battle of Pea Ridge, he commanded a brigade in the division of Ben McCulloch, who was killed by Union infantry fire. Shortly after assuming division command, McIntosh was leading an advance when he was struck and killed by a bullet, less than fifteen minutes after McCulloch's death.

He is buried in the Fort Smith National Cemetery. A memorial to Unknown Confederate Dead, made of marble, commemorates McIntosh, as well as Brigadier General Alexander E. Steen, a Missourian who was killed at the Battle of Prairie Grove.

== See also ==
- List of American Civil War generals (Confederate)
