= Maledon =

Maledon is a surname. Notable persons with that name include:

- George Maledon (1830-1911), American hangman
- Théo Maledon (born 2001), French basketball player
