= Alexander E. Steen =

Confederate States Army officer (c. 1827–1862)

- Born: Alexander Early Steen c. 1827; Missouri, U.S.
- Died: December 7, 1862 (aged 34–35); Washington County, Arkansas, C.S.
- Cause of death: Killed in action
- Burial place: Fort Smith National Cemetery
- Relatives: Lewis Henry Little (brother-in-law)
- Military career
- Allegiance: United States; Confederate States
- Branch: United States Army; Missouri State Guard; Confederate States Army
- Service years: 1847–1848, 1852–1861 (U.S.); 1861–1862 (C.S.)
- Rank: First Lieutenant (U.S.); Brigadier-General (Missouri); Colonel (C.S.)
- Commands: 5th Military District; 10th Missouri Infantry Regiment
- Battles: Mexican–American War; Battle of Contreras; Battle of Churubusco; American Civil War; Battle of Wilson's Creek; First Battle of Lexington; Battle of Prairie Grove †

Alexander Early Steen (c. 1827 – December 7, 1862) was a senior officer in the Confederate States Army. He commanded infantry in the Trans-Mississippi Theater of the American Civil War from 1861 until he was killed in action at the Battle of Prairie Grove in 1862.

== Mexican–American War ==
Steen was commissioned a second lieutenant in the 12th Infantry Regiment in early 1847. He served at Jefferson Barracks in St. Louis, Missouri, beginning in May 1847. By the mid-1850s, he was first lieutenant in the 3d Infantry Regiment and assigned to duty at Fort Union in the New Mexico Territory, where he led several lengthy reconnaissance patrols scouting for hostile Indians.

== American Civil War ==
With the outbreak of the American Civil War in 1861, many Missourians were forced to choose sides, especially after the state's neutrality came under test when pro-secessionist forces began organizing, and fighting between Unionists and secessionists became imminent. Steen returned to Missouri and was commissioned as the Lt Colonel of the Second Regiment, Missouri Volunteer Militia, a position he held concurrently with his commission in the U.S. Army. The Second Regiment, MVM, was composed primarily of members of the pro-secession "Minutemen" paramilitary organization. This unit was arrested by U.S. troops at Camp Jackson, on the outskirts of St. Louis on May 10, 1861, on suspicion of disloyal activities. Steen avoided arrest at Camp Jackson and reportedly submitted his resignation from the U.S. Army the same day.

On July 10, 1861, Steen was appointed as a brigadier general in the Missouri State Guard, serving as drillmaster at the State Guard encampment at Cowskin Prairie near the Arkansas border where he commanded the 5th Military District. On August 9, 1861, he accepted an appointment as a captain in the Confederate States Army to date to March 16, 1861. As a Missouri State Guard general, he led his brigade at the Battle of Wilson's Creek and the First Battle of Lexington.

When his Missouri State Guard brigade was sent to northern Mississippi in April 1862, he became ill at Memphis, Tennessee and returned to Missouri. On November 10, 1862, with the Missouri troops still east of the Mississippi River, Steen was appointed colonel, commanding the 10th Missouri Infantry Regiment. He was killed in action at the Battle of Prairie Grove on December 7, 1862. His body was recovered and reinterned in the Fort Smith. He is buried in the Fort Smith National Cemetery.

== Personal life ==
Steen was a brother-in-law of fellow Confederate general Lewis Henry Little. He was also a first cousin of Arkansas Governor Henry M. Rector.

== Honors ==
A memorial to Unknown Confederate Dead, made of marble, commemorates Steen, as well as Brigadier General James M. McIntosh, an Arkansan who was killed at the Battle of Pea Ridge.

== See also ==
- Acting Confederate generals

== Bibliography ==
- Allardice, Bruce S. More Generals in Gray. Baton Rouge: Louisiana State University Press, 1995. ISBN 978-0-8071-3148-0.
- Eicher, John H., and Eicher, David J., Civil War High Commands, Stanford University Press, 2001, ISBN 978-0-8047-3641-1.
- Journal of the Congress of the Confederate States of America, 1861-1865, Richmond, Virginia: Printer of the Confederate States Congress, 1861.
- "Missouri in the Civil War" adapted from Confederate Military History by Clement A. Evans, Confederate Publishing Company, Atlanta, Georgia, 1899.
