= Lewis Henry Little =

Confederate Army general

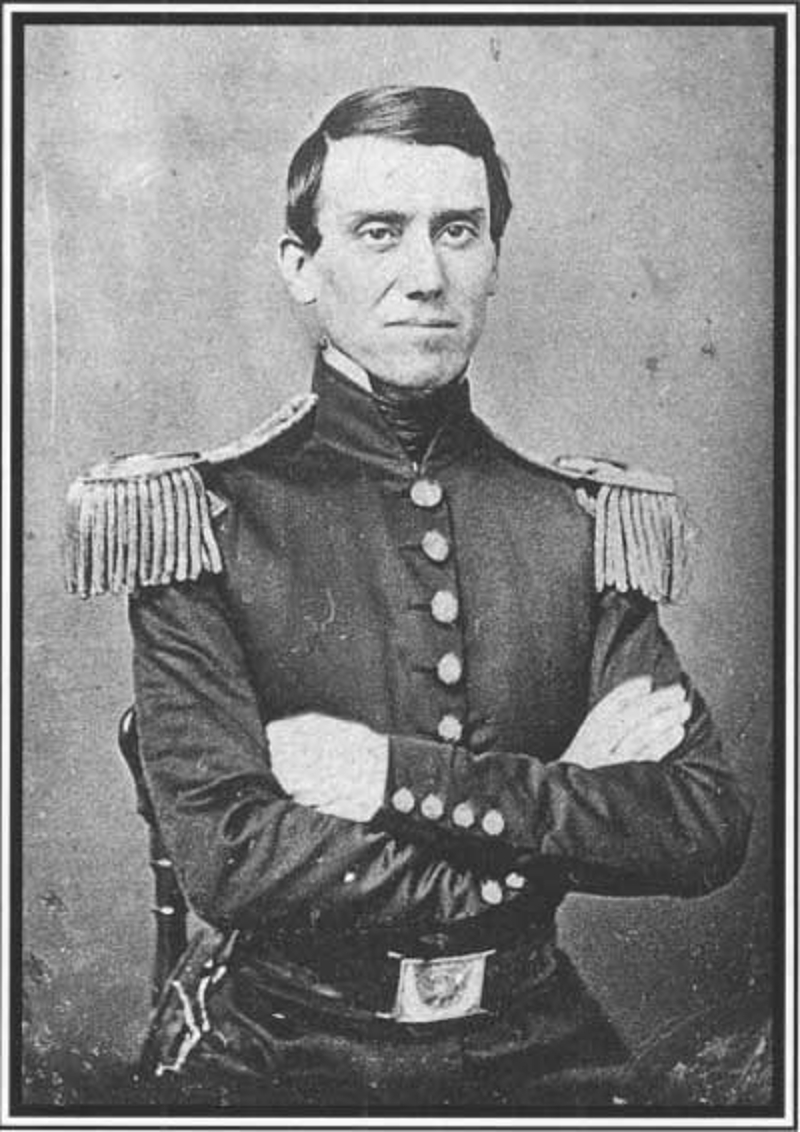
- Born: March 19, 1817; Baltimore, Maryland
- Died: September 19, 1862 (aged 45); Iuka, Mississippi
- Burial place: Green Mount Cemetery Baltimore, Maryland
- Relatives: brother-in-law of Alexander E. Steen
- Military career
- Allegiance: United States of America; Confederate States of America
- Branch: United States Army; Confederate States Army
- Service years: 1839–61 (USA); 1861–62 (CSA)
- Rank: Captain (USA); Brigadier General (CSA)
- Commands: 1st Missouri Brigade; 1st Division, Army of the West
- Conflicts: Mexican-American War: Battle of Monterrey; American Civil War: Battle of Pea Ridge; Battle of Iuka †

Lewis Henry Little (March 19, 1817 – September 19, 1862) was a career United States Army officer and a Confederate brigadier general during the American Civil War. He served mainly in the Western Theater and was killed in action during the Battle of Iuka.

== Early life and career ==
Little was born in Baltimore, Maryland to Peter Little and his wife Catherine on Mar. 19, 1817. He was a brother-in-law of Alexander E. Steen and son-in-law of Pitcairn Morrison. Little was commissioned a second lieutenant in the 5th U.S. Infantry in 1839 after graduating from West Point. He served in the Mexican War and was awarded a brevet promotion to captain for his service at the Battle of Monterrey in 1846. He was promoted to captain in the regular army on August 20, 1847.

== American Civil War ==
Little resigned his commission as a U.S. Army officer on May 7, 1861. He helped Sterling Price train the Missouri volunteers that soon joined the Southern armies. He entered the Confederate service as an infantry captain on March 16, 1861, but soon was made an artillery major that same month. Little was promoted to colonel on May 18 and served Price as his Adjutant General in the Missouri State Guard.

At the Battle of Pea Ridge on March 7, 1862, Little commanded the 1st Missouri Brigade in Price's division. In the thick of the first day's fighting near Elkhorn Tavern, he demonstrated competence and initiative. "During the course of the battle he gradually assumed more and more responsibility until he became the de facto commander of Price's division during the last hours that the Army of the West was on the field." His appointment to brigadier general occurred on April 12.

Little came east of the Mississippi River with Maj. Gen. Earl Van Dorn's army and served under Gen. P. G. T. Beauregard at Corinth. There, he caught malaria and was in poor health for the few remaining months of his life. Even so, he was regarded as "a thorough soldier and an excellent disciplinarian." At Corinth he was given command of the 1st Division in Price's Army of the West. His peers praised his division as well drilled and disciplined.

He led his division at the Battle of Iuka on September 19. At about 5:45 p.m., while sitting on his horse behind the front line and next to Sterling Price, he was struck in the head by a bullet and killed instantly. He is buried in Green Mount Cemetery in Baltimore.

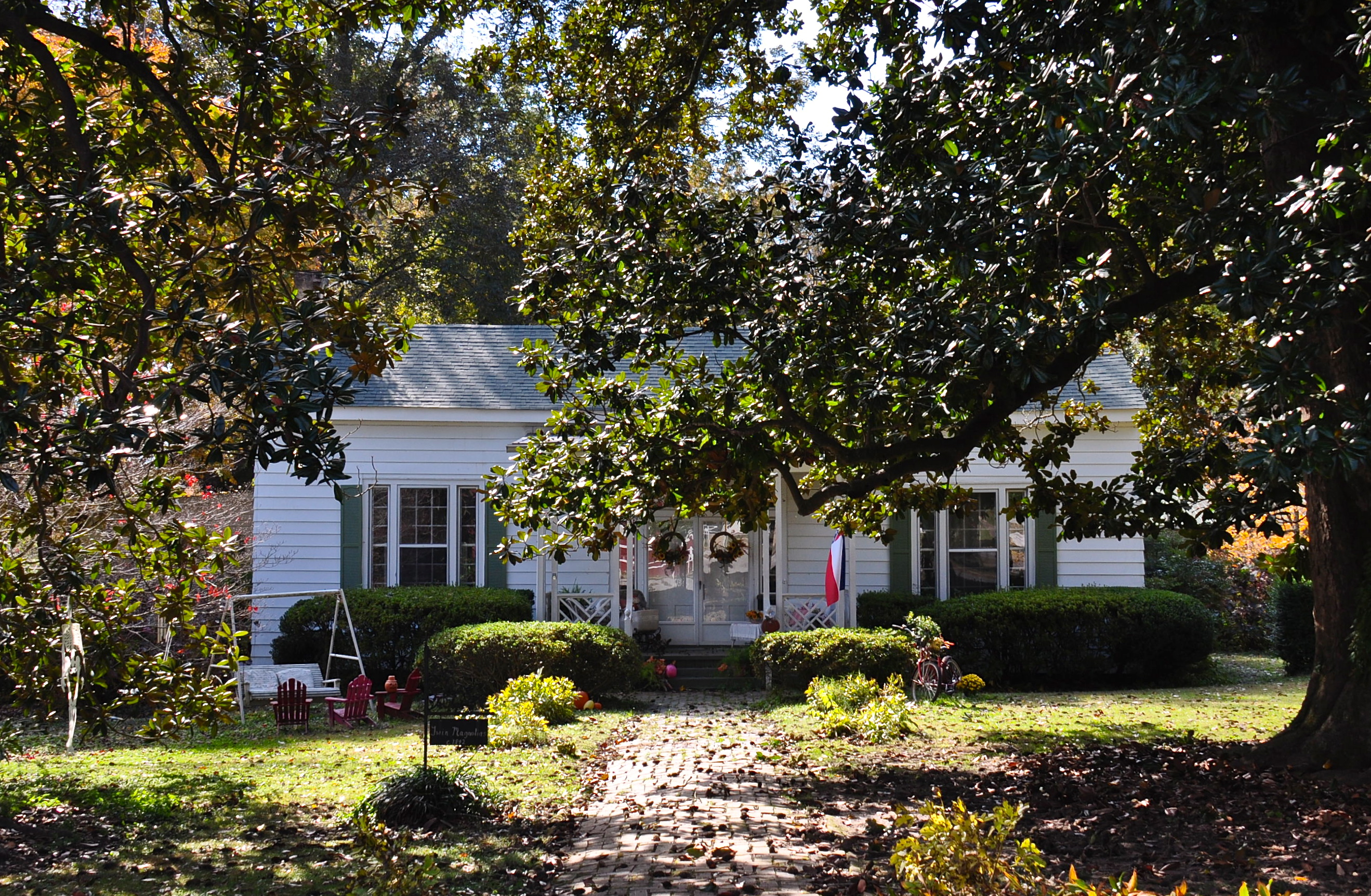
The J.M. Coman House, located at Iuka, MS, served as Little's headquarters during the Battle of Iuka and his body was brought here after he was killed. The house was listed on the National Register of Historic Places in 1991.

== See also ==
- List of American Civil War generals (Confederate)
