= Richard C. Gatlin =

Richard Caswell Gatlin
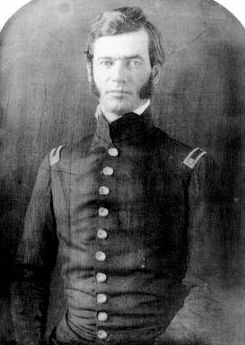
- Born: January 18, 1809; Kinston, North Carolina
- Died: September 8, 1896 (aged 87); Mount Nebo, Arkansas
- Burial place: Fort Smith National Cemetery
- Military career
- Allegiance: United States of America; Confederate States of America
- Branch: United States Army; Confederate States Army
- Service years: 1832–1861; 1861–1865
- Rank: Major (USA); Major General (N.C. Militia); Brigadier General (CSA)
- Units: 7th U.S. Infantry; 5th U.S. Infantry
- Commands: Department of North Carolina
- Conflicts: Seminole Wars; Utah War; Mexican–American War; American Civil War

Richard Caswell Gatlin (January 18, 1809 – September 8, 1896) was a Confederate general during the American Civil War.

== Early life ==
Gatlin was born in Kinston, North Carolina, the son of John Gatlin and Susannah Caswell Gatlin. His mother was the daughter of Richard Caswell, first governor of North Carolina. Gatlin was educated at the United States Military Academy, where he graduated 35th in his class in 1832, along with Philip St. George Cooke, Erasmus D. Keyes, George B. Crittenden, Randolph B. Marcy, and Humphrey Marshall.

== Personal life ==
Gatlin married Scioto Sandford. Scioto died after complications from childbirth in January 1852. Gatlin married Mary Ann Gibson of Arkansas on January 20, 1857.

== Military service ==
He was commissioned a second lieutenant in the 7th infantry, and served on frontier duty in Native American Territory, in the Seminole Wars from 1839 to 1842, and was then stationed in Louisiana until 1845, when he served in Texas, and was promoted to captain.

He served in the Mexican War, serving in the defense of Fort Brown in May 1846. Gatlin was wounded during an assault at the Battle of Monterey, and received the Brevet of major. In 1847 he was tendered the commission of colonel, First North Carolina volunteers, but declined it. He was an original member of the Aztec Club of 1847 - a military society for officers who were veterans of the Mexican War.

He then served in Missouri and Louisiana, took part in the Seminole Wars of 1849–50, and served on frontier duty in Kansas, Native American Territory, Arkansas and Dakota, until he marched with Albert Sidney Johnston to Utah, to take part in the Utah War. In 1860 he marched to New Mexico and was stationed at Fort Craig, and was promoted major of Fifth infantry in February 1861. While on a visit to Fort Smith, Arkansas, on April 23, 1861, he was captured by the Arkansas militia, and released on parole, after which he resigned his commission and offered his services to North Carolina.

== Civil War ==
Gatlin was appointed adjutant general of North Carolina, with the rank of major general of militia, and received the commission of colonel of infantry in the regular army of the Confederate States of America. He was then given command of the Southern department, coastal defense, with headquarters at Wilmington, North Carolina. He was promoted to brigadier general in August 1861 and was assigned to command the department of North Carolina and the coastal defenses of the State.

Soon after Gatlin was promoted to command, Fort Hatteras was captured by the Union. Gatlin then made preparations for the defense of New Bern. He made his headquarters at Goldsboro in September and there organized troops and prepared for the defense of the area. Upon his suggestion, an additional coastal district was formed and General Daniel H. Hill was made commander of the new district. Gatlin repeatedly requested reinforcements, but none were available and in March 1862, New Bern fell.

Gatlin was suffering from a severe illness and on March 19, 1862, he was relieved from duty. In his final report he stated that "we failed to make timely efforts to maintain the ascendancy on Pamlico sound, and thus admitted Burnside's fleet without a contest; we failed to put a proper force on Roanoke island, and thus lost the key to our interior coast, and we failed to furnish General Branch with a reasonable force, and thus lost the important town of New Bern. What I claim is that these failures do not by right rest with me."

Gatlin resigned in September 1862 but subsequently served as adjutant and inspector general of North Carolina.

== Post-war ==
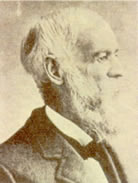
Gatlin in later years

After the end of the War, Gatlin moved to Sebastian County, Arkansas and farmed there until 1881. He then moved to Fort Smith. He died at Mount Nebo on September 8, 1896. He and his wife Mary Ann Gibson Gatlin are buried at Fort Smith National Cemetery.

== See also ==
- List of American Civil War generals (Confederate)
