= John Patten Story =

United States Army general

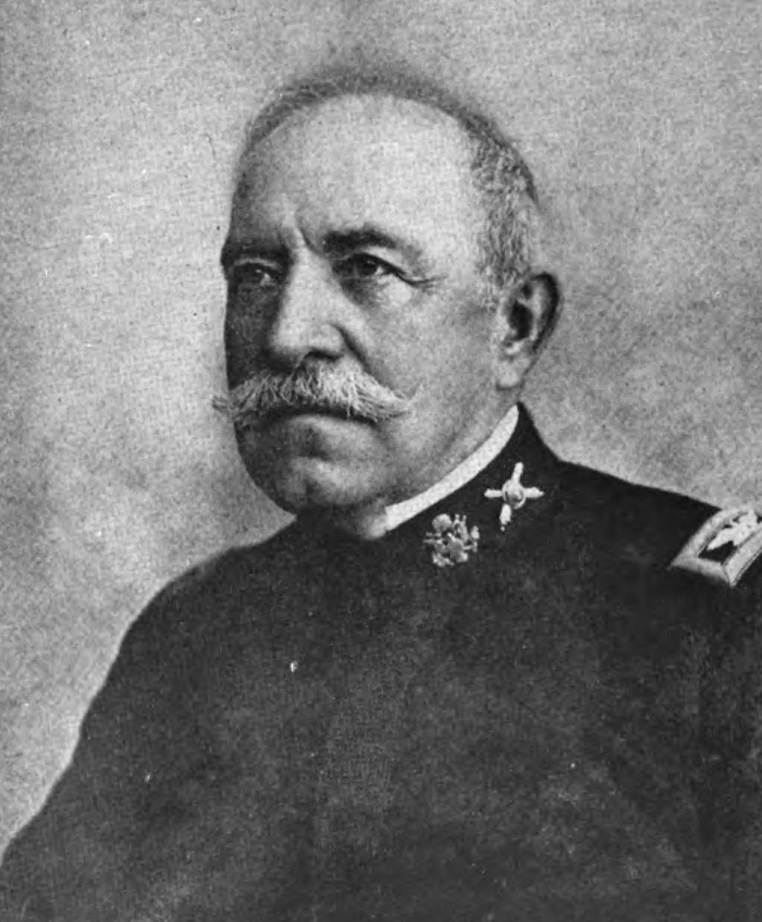
- From 1928's The Coast Artillery School, 1824–1927
- Born: August 25, 1841; Brookfield, Wisconsin, US
- Died: March 25, 1915 (aged 73); Pasadena, California, US
- Burial place: Arlington National Cemetery
- Spouse: Caroline Sherman (m. 1868–1915, her death)
- Children: 2
- Relatives: William Story (brother)
- Military career
- Allegiance: United States of America
- Branch: United States Army
- Service years: 1865–1905
- Rank: Major General
- Unit: United States Artillery Branch
- Commands: Battery H, 4th Artillery; Battery I, 4th Artillery; Fort Warren, Massachusetts; Harbor Defenses of Portland; U.S. Army Artillery School; U.S. Army Chief of Artillery
- Conflicts: Spanish–American War

John P. Story (August 25, 1841 – March 25, 1915) was a career officer in the United States Army who attained the rank of major general. An 1865 graduate of the United States Military Academy, he served from shortly after the end of the American Civil War until retiring in 1905. A specialist in the use of coastal artillery for harbor defense, he was most notable for his service as commandant of the Artillery School (1902–1904) and the Army's Chief of Artillery (1904–1905).

== Early life ==
John Patten Story was born in Brookfield, Wisconsin on August 25, 1841, the oldest of five children born to John P. Story (1806–1875) and Elizabeth (Quarles) Story (1816–1904). Story's family included several prominent individuals, including Joseph Story, who was his grand-uncle and William A. Barstow, who was an uncle by marriage. His siblings included William Story, who served as a federal judge and as lieutenant governor of Colorado. His brother Francis was a banker and businessman in California who served as president of the Los Angeles Area Chamber of Commerce. His sister Elizabeth was the first wife of Brigadier General Henry Albert Reed. His sister Anna was the wife of Judge Albert M. Stephens, who served on the probate court bench of Los Angeles County, California.

Story was educated in the schools of Waukesha, Wisconsin and received a Bachelor of Arts degree from Carroll College in 1858. He began to study law in preparation for a career as an attorney, but later decided on a military career and applied for admission to the United States Military Academy. Story was accepted, and began attendance at West Point in 1861. He graduated in 1865, ranked 20th in a class of 68. Among his classmates who became general officers were Charles W. Raymond, Alfred E. Bates, George H. Burton, and Samuel Meyers Mills Jr. Among his classmates who did not become general officers was Henry B. Ledyard Jr.

== Start of career ==
Story was commissioned as a second lieutenant in the 16th Infantry on June 23, 1865, and was promoted to first lieutenant on the same day. He served with his regiment at Madison Barracks, New York until August 1866, except for three months in Albany, New York as aide-de-camp to John C. Robinson, who commanded one of the districts of the Army's Department of the East.

From March to August 1866, Story served on post-war occupation duty in Nashville, Tennessee, first with the 16th Infantry, then with the 34th Infantry. He performed recruiting duty until April 1868, followed by special duty with the Signal Corps until August 1869. He was assigned to the 2nd Artillery Regiment in December 1870 and the 4th Artillery in January 1871. Story served on the West Point faculty from August 1869 to October 1874, first as assistant professor of mathematics, then as assistant professor of geography, history, and ethics, followed by service as principal assistant professor of mathematics.

Story joined a battery of the 4th Artillery at the Presidio of San Francisco in October 1874, and remained until December 1875. He served as quartermaster and commissary at San Diego Barracks, California from December 1875 until February 1876, followed by return to his battery in San Francisco. He attended the Artillery School at Fort Monroe, Virginia from May to August 1876, after which he was again assigned to special duty with the Signal Corps. The Signal Corps established the Weather Bureau in 1870, and Story made extensive studies in meteorology as part of his duties. He became adept at predicting the weather, and was recognized as one of the Army's foremost experts on how changes in weather affected military activities, including artillery fire.

== Continued career ==
In September 1883, Story was promoted to captain and in October he joined a battery of the 4th Artillery at Fort Warren, Massachusetts. While assigned to Fort Warren, Story's commands included Battery H, 4th Artillery and Battery I, 4th Artillery. In addition, he served as acting commander of the Fort Warren post on several occasions. Story remained at Fort Warren until April 1888, when he was assigned as an instructor at the Artillery School. He remained on the faculty at Fort Monroe until May 1898, and he was promoted to major in March 1898.

During the Spanish–American War, Story commanded the Harbor Defenses of Portland, Maine. From May 1898 to March 1902, Story was Inspector of Artillery for the Department of the East, and he was promoted to lieutenant colonel in May 1901. In March 1902, he was appointed commandant of the Artillery School, where he served until January 1904. He was promoted to colonel in October 1902.

In January 1904, Story was assigned as the Army's Chief of Artillery. He was promoted to major general on June 17, 1905, and he retired on June 19, 1905. As a specialist in the use of coastal artillery to defend harbors, Story was a member of the Army's Board of Ordnance and Fortifications from 1901 to 1902 and 1904 to 1905. He was a member of the Joint Army Navy Board from 1904 to 1905 and the National Coast Defense Board from 1905 to 1907.

After retiring, Story remained on duty to inspect coast artillery fortifications in California, which included San Francisco, San Pedro, and Fort Rosecrans. In 1906 he undertook a similar inspection tour in Hawaii, Guam, and the Philippines. In 1907 he served on a panel that observed the testing of new artillery at Sandy Hook Proving Ground and he later served on an Army board that considered the use of the Crozier and Brown wire-wound gun.

== Retirement and death ==
Deciding that the climate of southern California had a positive effect on his health, Story retired to Pasadena, California. He died at his home in Pasadena on March 25, 1915. Story was buried at Arlington National Cemetery.

== Family ==
In 1868, Story married Caroline Sherman (1848–1923) of Trenton, New Jersey. They were the parents of two children, John P. Story Jr. and Caroline Sherman Story.

John P. Story Jr. (1872–1966) was involved in the real estate and insurance businesses. He worked and lived primarily in Washington, D.C.

Caroline Story (1870–1914) was the wife of Belgian diplomat Count Conrad De Buisseret. When she died in December 1914 as the result of diphtheria contracted while working as a nurse near the front lines of World War I, her husband was serving as Minister to Russia in Petrograd. According to contemporary newspaper accounts, General Story's health declined rapidly after learning of his daughter's death in Belgium, and he died soon afterwards.

== Legacy ==
In 1887 he became a member of the Massachusetts Society of the Cincinnati by right of descent from Lieutenant Colonel John Story of the Continental Army. Story was the author of 1894's Elements of Elastic Strength of Guns. This technical work was used for several years as a textbook at the Artillery School. The Army's Fort Story, now Joint Expeditionary Base Fort Story, was named for Story. A U.S. Army mine planting ship, USAMP General John P. Story, was launched in 1919 and was named in Story's honor. The ship was later rechristened USCGC Acacia, and was used by the United States Lighthouse Service and United States Coast Guard until it was sunk during World War II.

== Sources ==
=== Books ===
- The History of Waukesha County, Wisconsin. Chicago: Western Historical Company. 1880 – via Internet Archive.
- Boyd's Directory of the District of Columbia. Vol. 56. Washington, DC: Southfield, MI. 1914. p. 647.
- Association of Graduates of the United States Military Academy (1915). Annual Reunion Proceedings. Vol. 46. Saginaw, Michigan: Seemann & Peters. pp. 52–55 – via Google Books.
- Cullum, George W.; Robinson, Wirt (1920). Biographical Register of the Officers and Graduates of the United States Military Academy. Vol. Supplement, Volume VI-A. Saginaw, Michigan: Seemann & Peters. p. 111 – via Google Books.
- Evans, Jesse Fant (1935). Hamburg, the Colonial Town that Became the Seat of the George Washington University. Washington, DC: General Alumni Association of the George Washington University. p. 25 – via Google Books.
- Evans-Hylton, Patrick (2005). Hampton Roads: The World War II Years. Charleston, South Carolina: Arcadia Publishing. p. 29. ISBN 978-0-7385-1766-7 – via Google Books.
- Massachusetts Society of the Cincinnati (1931). Memorials of the Massachusetts Society of the Cincinnati. Boston: Geo. H. Ellis Co. p. 444 – via HathiTrust.
- U.S. Army Adjutant General (1898). Sources of Information on Professional Military Subjects. Vol. XVII. U.S. Department of War: Washington, DC. p. 56 – via Google Books.
- U.S. Secretary of War (1881). Certain Papers Relating to Signal Service. Washington, DC: US Government Printing Office. p. 11 – via Google Books.

=== Newspapers ===
- "Local and Miscellaneous: John P. Story, Jr". Racine Daily Journal. Racine, Wisconsin. April 13, 1861. p. 1 – via Newspapers.com.
- "A Cold Day, But a Good Shot". The Boston Globe. Boston. December 2, 1887. p. 6 – via Newspapers.com.
- "The Following Transfers in the Fourth Artillery Have Been Made". Kansas City Times. Kansas City, Missouri. March 5, 1888. p. 1 – via Newspapers.com.
- "More Guns Coming". The Boston Globe. Boston. May 12, 1898. p. 7 – via Newspapers.com.
- "Children War Exiles". The Washington Post. Washington, DC. February 14, 1915. p. 3 – via Newspapers.com.
- "Grief Cause of Death". South Bend News-Times. South Bend, Indiana. March 26, 1915. p. 16 – via Newspapers.com.
- "Marriage Notice: Albert Miller Stephens and Anna Story". Los Angeles Times. Los Angeles. May 7, 1916. p. 42 – via Newspapers.com.

=== Internet ===
- "1860 United States Federal Census, Entry for John P. Story Family". Ancestry.com. Lehi, Utah: Ancestry.com, LLC.
- "USCGC Acacia (WAGL-200)". NavSource. Gary P. Priolo.
- Cullum, George W. (7 January 2014). "Register of Officers and Graduates of the United States Military Academy, Class of 1865". Bill Thayer's Web Site. Chicago: Bill Thayer.
