= Isaac C. Parker =

American politician (1838–1896)

Isaac Charles Parker
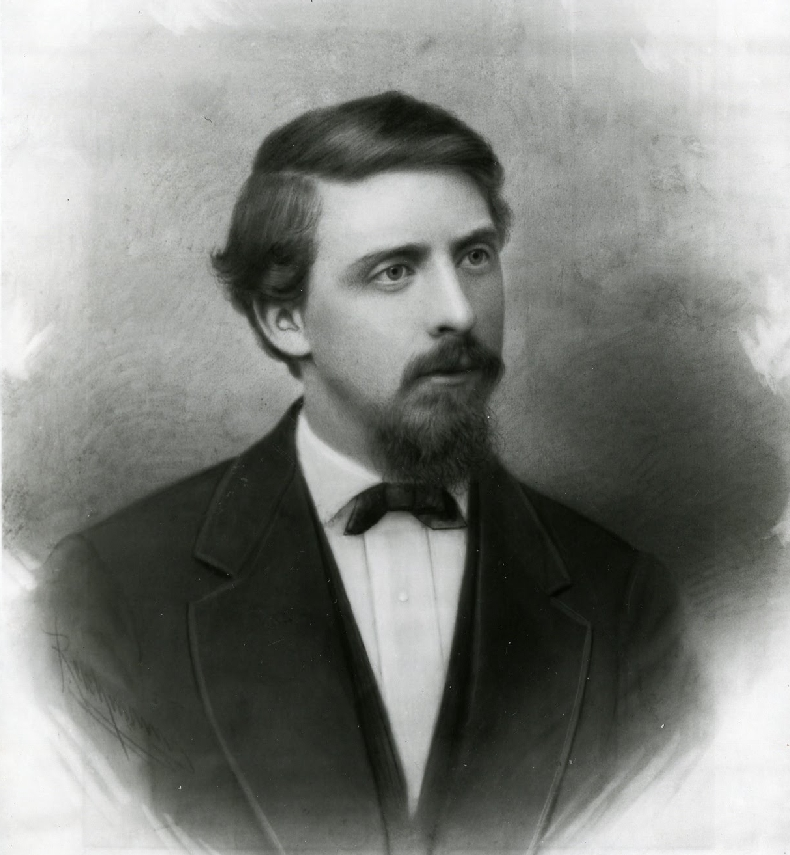
- Portrait of Isaac C. Parker, Fort Smith National Historic Site

Judge of the United States District Court for the Western District of Arkansas
- In office March 19, 1875 – November 17, 1896
- Appointed by: Ulysses S. Grant
- Preceded by: William Story
- Succeeded by: John Henry Rogers

Member of the U.S. House of Representatives from Missouri
- In office March 4, 1871 – March 3, 1875
- Preceded by: Joel Funk Asper
- Succeeded by: David Rea
- Constituency: 7th district (1871–1873); 9th district (1873–1875)

Personal details
- Born: Isaac Charles Parker; October 15, 1838 Barnesville, Ohio, U.S.
- Died: November 17, 1896 (aged 58) Fort Smith, Arkansas, U.S.
- Resting place: Fort Smith National Cemetery, Fort Smith, Arkansas
- Party: Democratic (until 1864); Republican (from 1864)
- Spouse(s): Mary O'Toole, 1861-1896 (his death)
- Children: 2 sons with O'Toole
- Education: Read law

Isaac Charles Parker (October 15, 1838 – November 17, 1896) was an American politician and jurist. He served as a United States representative in two separate congressional districts subsequently from Missouri and was appointed as the first United States district judge of the United States District Court for the Western District of Arkansas. His court was situated in Fort Smith, Arkansas on the border of Arkansas and Indian Territory. His jurisdiction also included the adjacent Indian Territory, future Oklahoma in 1907, to the west. He was appointed by President Ulysses S. Grant in 1875 and served in the federal judiciary until his death in 1896.

Parker became known as the "hanging judge" of the American frontier, because he sentenced numerous convicts to death. In serving 21 years on the federal bench, Judge Parker tried 13,490 cases. In more than 8,500 of these cases, the defendant either pleaded guilty or was convicted at trial. Parker sentenced 160 people to death; 79 were executed. The other 81 either died while incarcerated, were pardoned, or had their sentences commuted.

== Early life ==
Born in Ohio, Parker was the youngest son of Joseph Parker and his wife Jane Shannon. He was the great-nephew of Ohio Governor Wilson Shannon. He was raised on the family farm near Barnesville, Ohio. He attended Breeze Hill Primary School, followed by the Barnesville Classical Institute, a private school. He taught in a county primary school to pay for his secondary education. At 17, he began an apprenticeship in law, called "reading the law" with an established firm, and passed the Ohio bar examination in 1859 at the age of 21.

Parker moved to St. Joseph, Missouri between 1859 and 1861, where he joined his maternal uncle's law firm of Shannon and Branch. On December 12, 1861, Parker married Mary O'Toole, with whom he had sons Charles and James. By 1862, Parker had his own law firm. He represented clients in the municipal and county courts.

== Political career ==
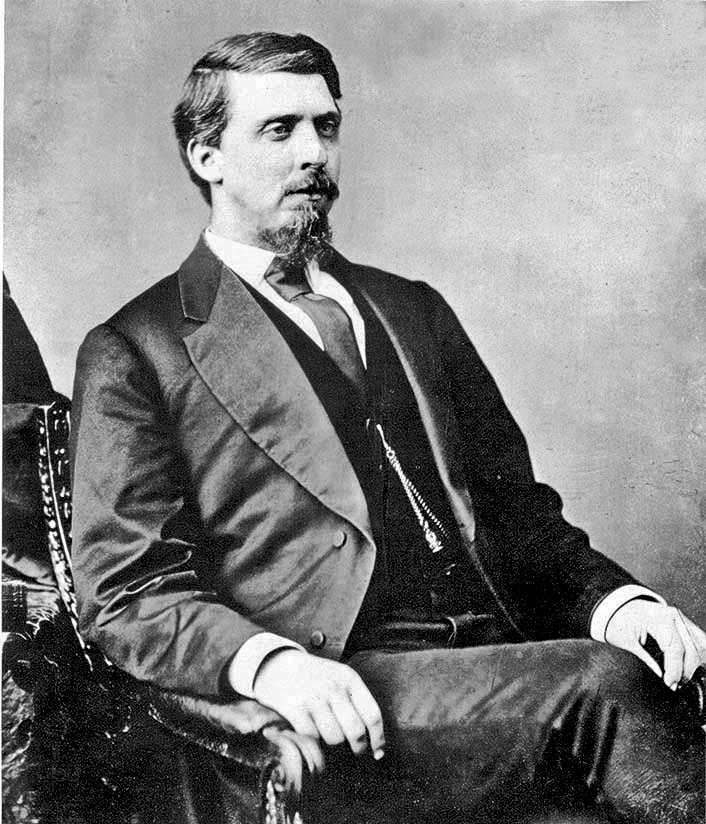
Photo of Isaac Parker taken between 1860 and 1865

In April 1861, Parker ran as a Democrat for part-time position of city attorney for St. Joseph. He served three one-year terms, from April 1861 to 1863. When the American Civil War broke out four days after Parker took office, he enlisted in a pro-Union home guard unit, the 61st Missouri Emergency Regiment. He had reached the rank of corporal by the end of the war.

During the 1860s, Parker continued both his legal and political careers. In 1864, he formally split from the Democratic Party over conflicting opinions on slavery. He ran as a Republican for county prosecutor of the Ninth Missouri Judicial District. By the fall of 1864, he was serving as a member of the Electoral College and voted for re-election of Abraham Lincoln. In 1868, Parker won a six-year term as judge of the Twelfth Missouri Circuit.

Parker was nominated for Missouri's 7th congressional district on September 13, 1870, backed by the Radical faction of the Republican Party. He resigned his judgeship and devoted his energy to his campaign. Parker won the election after his opponent withdrew two weeks prior to the vote. Parker was elected as a Republican to the U.S. House of Representatives of the 42nd and 43rd U.S. Congresses, serving from March 4, 1871, to March 3, 1875. He was the caucus nominee of his party for U.S. Senator in 1874.

The first session of the 42nd Congress convened on March 4, 1871. During his first term, Parker helped to secure pensions for veterans in his district and campaigned for a new federal building to be built in St. Joseph. He sponsored a failed bill designed to enfranchise women and allow them to hold public office in United States territories. He also sponsored legislation to organize the Indian Territory under a territorial government.

Parker was again elected to Missouri's 7th district in the 43rd U.S. Congress. A local paper wrote of him, "Missouri had no more trusted or influential representative in ... Congress during the past two years".

In his second term, Parker concentrated on Indian policy, including the fair treatment of the tribes residing in the Indian Territory. His speeches in support of the Bureau of Indian Affairs gained national attention.

In 1874, Parker was the caucus nominee of the Republican Party for a Missouri Senate seat. However, the political tide had shifted in Missouri; it seemed unlikely that the legislature would elect him to the Senate, so he sought a presidential appointment as judge for the Western District of Arkansas.

== Federal judicial service ==
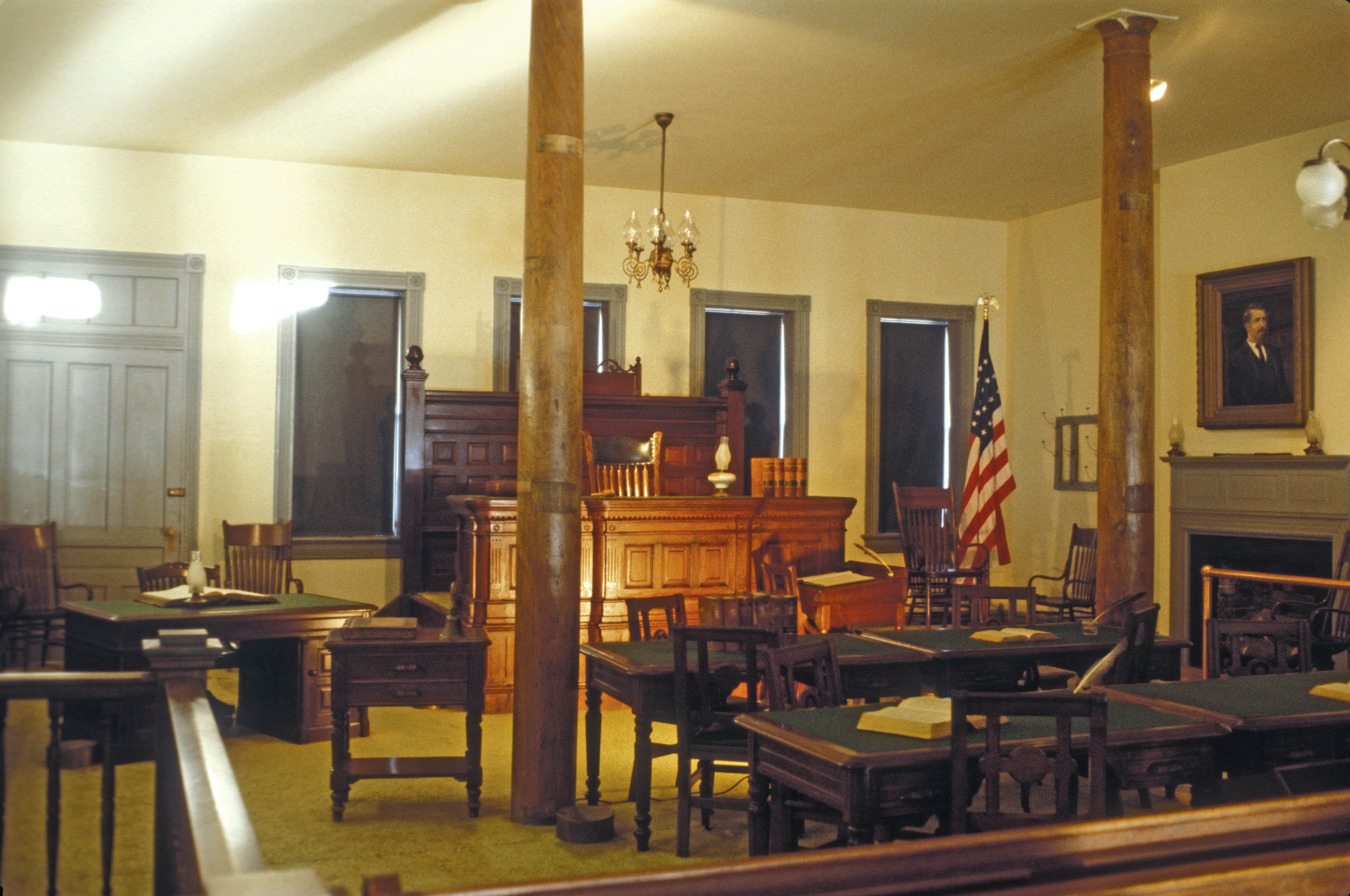
Photo of Parker's courtroom reconstructed at the Fort Smith National Historic Site, taken some 70 years later in 1966

On May 26, 1874, President Ulysses S. Grant nominated Parker as Chief Justice of the Utah Territory to replace James B. McKean. At his own request ten months later, Parker was instead nominated by President Grant on March 18, 1875, to a seat on the U.S. District Court for the Western District of Arkansas. It had been previously vacated by federal Judge William Story (1843–1921), who resigned under threat of impeachment by the Senate for allegations of corruption.

Parker was confirmed the next day by the U.S. Senate on March 19, 1875, and received his commission the same day. He served in this position until his death in office 21 years later, on November 17, 1896.

Parker arrived in Fort Smith, Arkansas, which sits on the western border between the 25th state of Arkansas and the Indian Territory, a month and a half later on May 4, 1875; initially without his family. Parker's first session sitting as the district judge was on May 10, 1875, with court prosecutor W. H. H. Clayton (1840–1920) present. Clayton subsequently served as the U.S. Attorney for the Western District of Arkansas for fourteen of Parker's twenty-one years tenure on the court.

On the same day of his first session in court, May 10, Parker commissioned Bass Reeves (1838–1910), whom U.S. Marshal Fagan had heard about, as a Deputy U.S. Marshal. Reeves knew the Indian Territory well and could speak several Native languages. Reeves became the first African American Deputy U.S. Marshal west of the Mississippi River.

In May 1875, Parker tried 18 men during his first session of court, all of whom were charged with murder; 15 were convicted in jury trials. Parker sentenced eight of them to a mandatory death penalty. He ordered six of the men to be executed at the same time on September 3, 1875. One of those sentenced to death was killed trying to escape. The Arkansas Governor commuted the sentence of another to life in prison due to his youth. In an interview shortly before his death later that November with the well-known daily newspaper with regional circulation The St. Louis Republic (1808–1919) on September 1, 1896, Parker said that he had really no say in whether a convict was to be hanged or not due to compulsory death sentences dictated by the law, and that he actually personally favored "the abolition of capital punishment".

Parker's court had final jurisdiction over federal crimes in the adjacent Indian Territory for 14 years from the time of his appointment in 1875 until 1889, as there was no other court available for appeals except to the President of the United States through his recently established (1870) United States Department of Justice. The Five Civilized Tribes and other Native American tribes assigned in the Indian Territory had jurisdiction over their own citizens through their semi-independent tribal legal systems and governments allowed by treaty. Federal law in the Indian Territory applied to non-Indian United States citizens.

According to the policies set up by the United States Congress, the federal court for the Western District of Arkansas was to meet in four separate terms each year, in February, May, August, and November. However, the court had such a heavy caseload and wide territorial jurisdiction that the four terms were run continuously. Parker's court sat for six days a week in order to ensure prosecuting as many cases as possible in each term, and often in session for up to ten hours each day. Finally eight years later, in 1883, the Congress reduced the jurisdiction and territory of the District Court, reassigning parts of the Indian Territory to the south and the north borderlands to federal courts in adjacent states of Texas and Kansas (admitted earlier to the Union in 1845 and 1861, respectively). However, the increasing number of European American settlers moving into Indian lands and increased strife and criminal activity in sparsely settled areas still increased Parker and the court's workload.

From May 1, 1889, because of the opening of the newly organized Oklahoma Territory further west and some parts of the Indian Territory to White settlers in the famous Oklahoma Land Rush of 1889 of that earlier April, Congress made changes to allow appeals of capital convictions to go instead to the U.S. Supreme Court in Washington, D.C. Forty-four cases in which Parker imposed the death penalty were appealed to the Supreme Court. It overturned and ordered a re-trial for 30 of them.

While serving as a federal district judge in Fort Smith, Parker also was active in the local community, serving on the Fort Smith School Board. He was the first president of St. John's Hospital, established by the local parish St. John's Episcopal Church. Today, this hospital still exists as a medical agency, although affiliated with a different Protestant denomination, as Baptist Health Fort Smith.

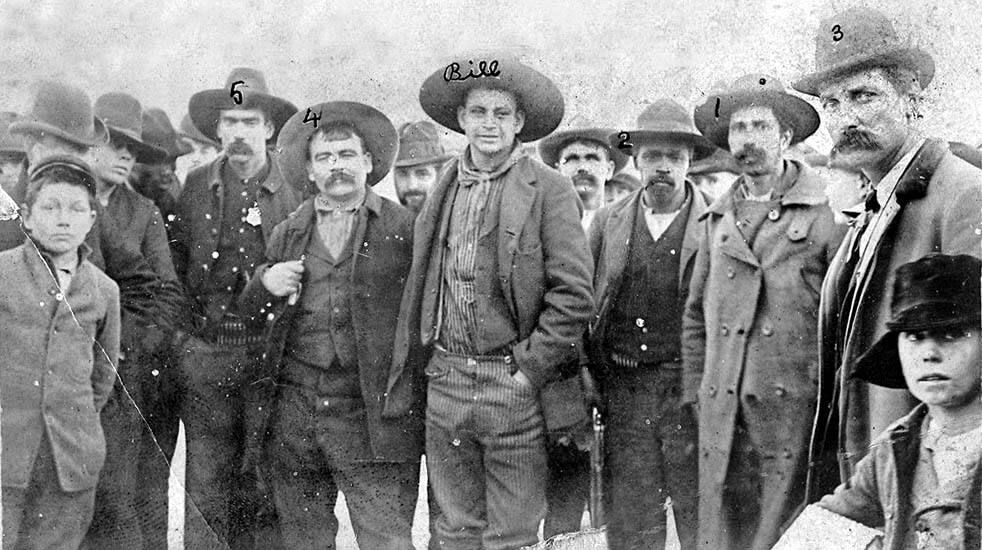
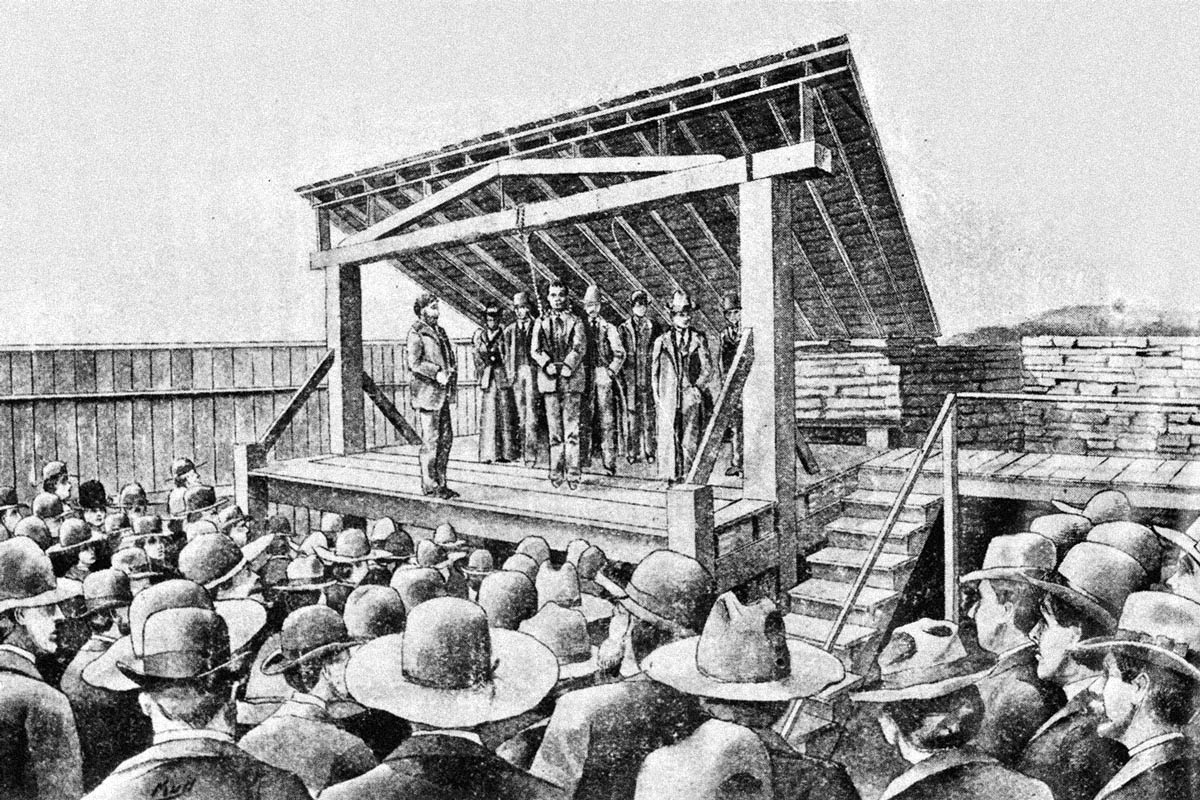
(Left): Cherokee Bill Goldsby posing with his captors during a stop by train to Nowata, 1895. Left to right are #5)Zeke Crittenden; #4)Dick Crittenden;Cherokee Bill; #2)Clint Scales, #1) Ike Rogers; #3) Deputy Marshall Bill Smith.;
(right): depiction of the hanging, as it was published by newspapers after his execution

In his time on the federal court, Parker presided over a number of high-profile cases, including the trial of Crawford Goldsby, famously known as "Cherokee Bill", and the "Oklahoma Boomer" case involving David L. Payne, a non-Indian who illegally settled on tribal lands in the Indian Territory. In 1895, Parker heard two cases involving Goldsby. In the first, Goldsby was charged with killing a bystander during a general-store robbery the year before in 1894.

He was convicted in that case that lasted from February 26 to June 25, 1895, and Parker sentenced him to death. While awaiting execution, Goldsby attempted to escape prison and killed a prison guard during the incident. He was tried again and convicted once again in Parker's court; the judge sentenced him to a second death penalty on December 2, 1895. Goldsby was subsequently hanged three months later on March 17, 1896.

=== Later years ===
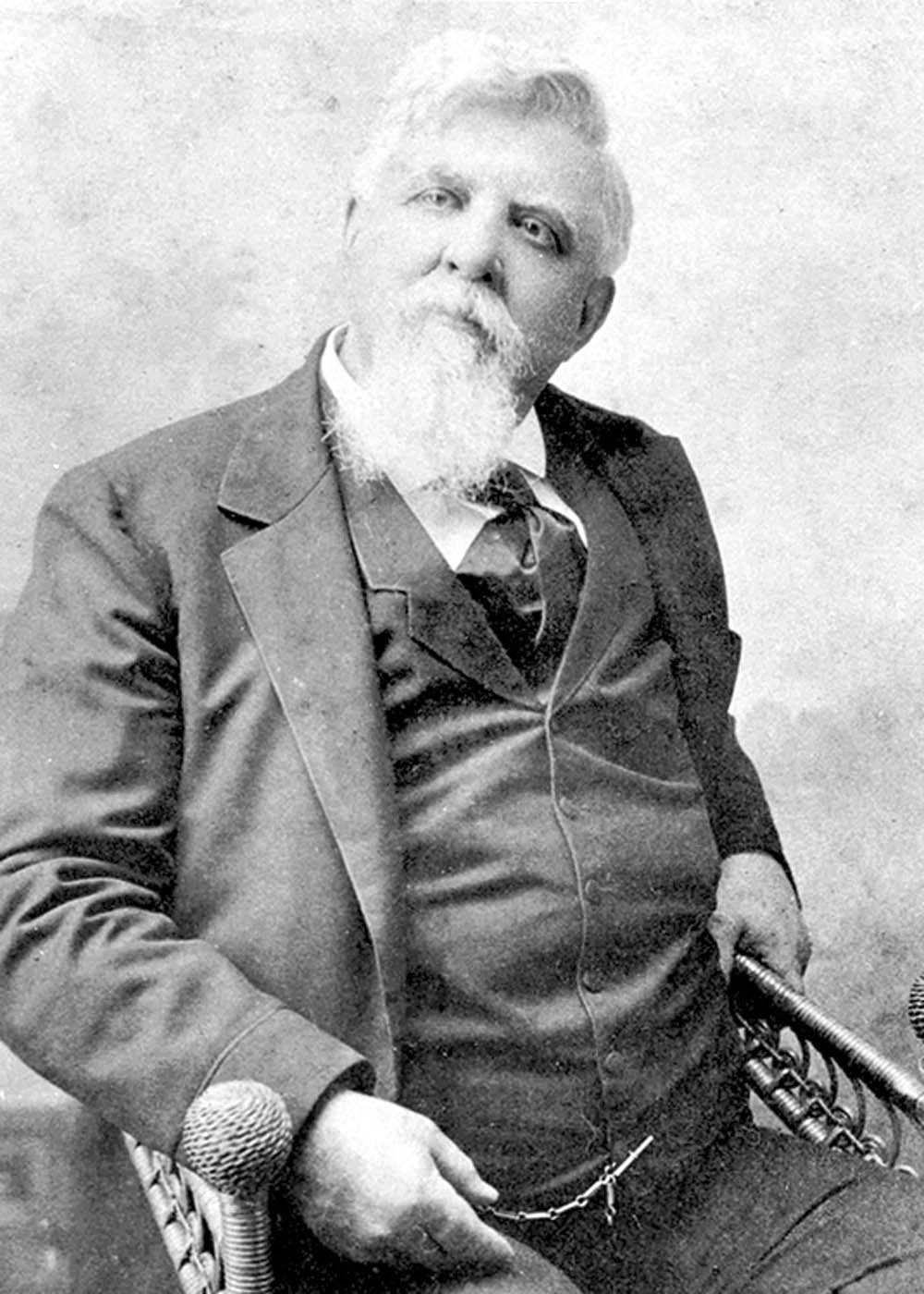
Parker in his later years

Keeping with continued settlement in the American West, the Courts Act of 1889 enacted by Congress finally established a federal court system in the Indian Territory. This decreased the span of jurisdiction of the Western District of Arkansas Federal Court at Fort Smith.

Parker clashed with the U.S. Supreme Court in far off Washington on a number of occasions. In around two-thirds of cases appealed to the Supreme Court from his District Court, before the authorization of the current intermediate United States Circuit Court of Appeals regional system in the Judiciary Act of 1891, his rulings were upheld. In 1894, Parker gained national attention in a dispute with the Supreme Court over the case of Lafayette Hudson.

Hudson was convicted of assault with intent to kill and sentenced to four years' imprisonment. He appealed to the Supreme Court and was granted bail. Judge Parker refused to release Hudson on the grounds that the statute law did not provide the Supreme Court with the authority to demand Hudson's release.

A year later in 1895, Congress itself addressed the issue in dispute by passing a Courts Act that removed the remaining Indian Territory jurisdiction of the Western District of Arkansas in Fort Smith and powers of Judge Parker, effective September 1, 1896.

== Death and legacy ==
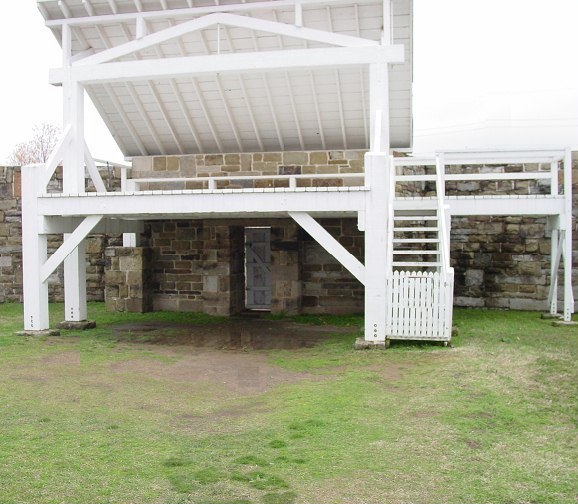
Present-day image of the reconstructed gallows now located at the Fort Smith National Historic Site, taken in 2008

When the August 1896 term began, Parker was at home, suffering from Bright's disease and too ill to preside over the court. The jurisdiction of the court over Indian Territory was ended on September 1, 1896. Reporters wanted to interview Parker about his career, but had to talk to him at his bedside. Parker died on November 17, 1896, aged 58, from a number of health conditions, including heart degeneration and Bright's disease. His funeral in Fort Smith had the highest number of attendees up to that point. He is buried at the Fort Smith National Cemetery.

In 2019, the city of Fort Smith unveiled a statue of Parker representing law and order.

== See also ==
- George Maledon, an American hangman aptly nicknamed "The Prince of Hangmen", who served in the federal court of Judge Isaac Parker
- Shannon Political Family

U.S. House of Representatives
Preceded by Joel Funk Asper	Member of the U.S. House of Representatives from Missouri's 7th congressional district 1871–1875	Succeeded by Thomas Theodore Crittenden
Legal offices
Preceded by William Story	Judge of the United States District Court for the Western District of Arkansas; 1875–1896	Succeeded by John Henry Rogers
