= Henry A. Reed =

US Army brigadier general (1844–1930)

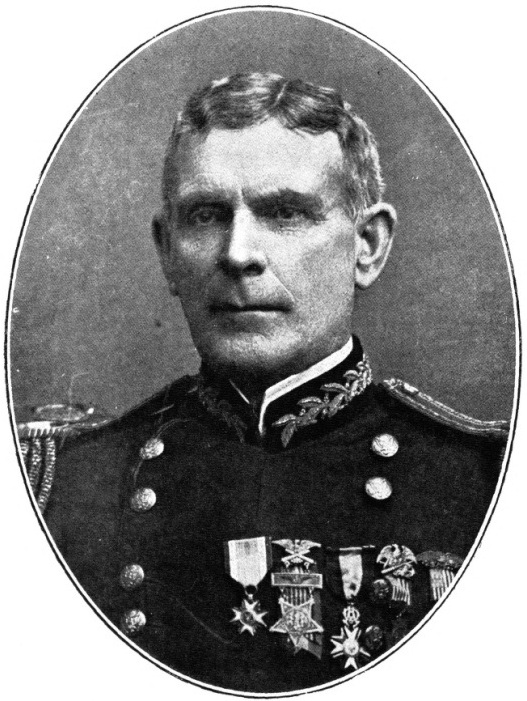
- From 1922's Crónica de La Guerra Hispano-Americana en Puerto Rico
- Born: 23 June 1844; Plattsburgh, New York, US
- Died: 30 November 1930 (aged 86); San Juan, Puerto Rico, US
- Burial place: Santa María Magdalena de Pazzis Cemetery, San Juan, Puerto Rico, US
- Education: United States Military Academy
- Spouse(s): Elizabeth Quarles Story (m. 1872–1897) Gertrudis Justa Asenjo Reed (m. 1899–1930)
- Children: 4
- Relatives: John Patten Story (Brother in law); William Story (Brother in law)
- Military career
- Allegiance: Union (American Civil War); United States
- Service: Union Army; United States Army
- Service years: 1862–1865 (Union Army); 1870–1906 (US Army)
- Rank: Brigadier General
- Units: US Army Infantry Branch; US Army Field Artillery Branch
- Commands: Company I, 24th Wisconsin Infantry Regiment; Heavy Field Battery, 5th Regiment of Artillery; Fort San Cristóbal; Fort Moultrie; Artillery District of San Juan; Fort Caswell; Artillery District of the Columbia
- Wars: American Civil War; American Indian Wars; Spanish–American War
- Awards: Gold Medal, Military Service Institution of the United States

Henry A. Reed (23 June 1844 – 30 November 1930) was a career officer in the United States Army. A Union Army veteran of the American Civil War, he went on to serve in the American Indian Wars and Spanish–American War. Reed served from 1862 to 1865 and 1870 to 1906, and attained the rank of brigadier general.

Reed was born in Plattsburgh, New York and raised and educated in Milwaukee. In 1862, he joined the Union Army for the American Civil War. Enlisting as a private in Company I, 24th Wisconsin Infantry Regiment, he took part in several battles in Kentucky and Tennessee, including: the Battle of Perryville and Battle of Stones River; the Chattanooga campaign including the Battle of Chickamauga, defense of Chattanooga, and Battle of Missionary Ridge; the Knoxville campaign including the pursuit from Knoxville; and the Battle of Nashville. He was wounded at Stones River and Chickamauga, and advanced through the ranks to first sergeant before receiving his commission in February 1865 as a first lieutenant of Infantry in Company I. He later commanded the company, and he remained in the army until he received his discharge in June 1865.

After the war, Reed attended the United States Military Academy at West Point, from which he graduated in 1870. Commissioned in the Field Artillery. Reed served briefly on frontier duty in Nevada during the American Indian Wars, then became a specialist in the emerging field of coast artillery, and served at harbor posts including Fort McHenry and Fort Foote in Maryland, Fort Schuyler in New York, and Fort Trumbull, Connecticut. From 1876 to 1880 and 1883 to 1888, he served on the West Point faculty.

During the Spanish–American War, Reed commanded a heavy battery in Puerto Rico, and he later commanded San Juan's Fort San Cristóbal. He later commanded the Artillery District of San Juan and the Artillery District of the Columbia in Oregon. In 1906, he was eligible for advancement to brigadier general and retirement based on laws permitting Civil War veterans to be promoted if they held a rank lower than brigadier general and retire before the mandatory age of 64 if they had served for over 40 years. In retirement, Reed lived in San Juan. He died there on 30 November 1930. Reed was buried at Santa María Magdalena de Pazzis Cemetery in San Juan.

== Early life ==
Henry Albert Reed was born in Plattsburgh, New York on 23 June 1844, the son of Paul Adam Reed and Charlotte Helena (Luther) Reed. He was raised and educated in Milwaukee, Wisconsin and as a teenager began work as a clerk in an insurance office. In August 1862, Reed enlisted in the Union Army for the American Civil War. He joined the 24th Wisconsin Infantry Regiment during its initial organization and was assigned as a private in Company I.

During the war, Reed advanced through the ranks to become a sergeant and first sergeant, and served in several battles and campaigns in Tennessee and Kentucky. These included the Battle of Perryville and Battle of Stones River, and he was wounded at Stones River. He went on to take part in the Chattanooga campaign, to include the Battle of Chickamauga, at which he was again wounded. He took part in the subsequent defense of Chattanooga and Battle of Missionary Ridge, which were followed by taking part in the Knoxville campaign, the pursuit of Confederate troops from Knoxville, and the Battle of Nashville. In February 1865, he received his commission as a first lieutenant of Infantry in Company I. He went on to command the company, and he continued his army service until he was discharged in June 1865.

== Early career ==
In 1866, Reed was appointed to the United States Military Academy at West Point. He graduated in 1870 ranked 12th of 59 and received his commission as a second lieutenant of Field Artillery. After receiving his commission, Reed served with the garrison at the Presidio of San Francisco, California from October 1870 to July 1871. He performed American Indian Wars frontier duty at Fort McDermit, Nevada, near the reservation of the Paiute and Shoshone people from July 1871 to March 1872. From March 1872 to January 1873, Reed was posted to Fort Alcatraz, California.

=== Family ===
In 1872, Reed married Elizabeth Quarles Story (1849–1922), the sister of Brigadier General John Patten Story and Judge William Story. They were married until their 1897 divorce, and were the parents of son Henry Paul Reed (b. 1875) and daughter Helen Elizabeth Reed (1882–1887). In 1899, he married Gertrudis Justa Asenjo (1880–1945). They were married until his death, and were the parents of sons Henry Frederick Reed (1900–1981) and Paul Adam Reed (b. 1901).

== Continued career ==
Reed began to specialize in coast artillery and served at Fort McHenry, Maryland from January to April 1873. From May 1873 to May 1874, he attended the Artillery School for Practice at Fort Monroe, Virginia. From May 1874 to November 1874, he was assigned to the garrison at Fort Foote, Maryland, after which he served again at Fort McHenry, this time until May 1875. Reed was promoted to first lieutenant in May 1875.

Reed performed temporary Signal duty at Fort Whipple, Virginia from May 1875 to August 1876. He served on the West Point faculty as principal assistant professor of drawing and assistant instructor of military signaling and telegraphy from August 1876 to August 1880. He served at Washington Barracks D.C. from August 1880 to Jan. 21, 1881. He was then assigned to Jackson Barracks, Louisiana, where he served until June 1881. He served in Atlanta, Georgia until October 9, 1881.

From October to November 1881, Reed served in Yorktown, Virginia during the celebration that commemorated the end of the American Revolutionary War, then served temporarily at Fort McHenry until December 1882. From December 1882 to July 1883, he served at Fort Leavenworth, Kansas. Reed the resumed his position on the West Point faculty, where he remained from August 1883 to August 1888.

== Later career ==
Reed was on a leave of absence from August to December 1888, during which he traveled extensively in Europe. From December 1888 to April 1889, he was with the garrison at Fort Wadsworth, New York. Reed was posted to Fort Leavenworth, Kansas from April 1889 to October 1891. In 1891, Reed's essay for the Journal of the Military Service Institution of the United States resulted in award of the institution's gold medal. He was then assigned to Fort Schuyler, New York, where he remained until April, 1892. From April 1892 to April 1897, he performed coast artillery duty at Fort Trumbull, Connecticut, Fort Adams, Rhode Island, and Fort Schuyler. From April 1897 to April 1898, Reed performed staff duty in the office of the Adjutant General of the United States Army, and he was promoted to captain in March 1898.

During the Spanish–American War, Reed served at Fort Monroe from April to June 1898. He was at the Tampa, Florida port of embarkation from June to August 1898. He then served in Puerto Rico as commander of the Heavy Field Battery of the 5th Regiment of Artillery, a post he held through October 1898. He was then assigned to command the former Spanish post at Fort San Cristóbal, where he remained until 1901. In August 1901, Reed received promotion to major. From 1901 to 1902, Reed commanded the post at Fort Moultrie, South Carolina. From 1902 to 1905, he commanded the Artillery District of San Juan and was a member of the Board on the Permanent Plan for the Post of San Juan. From 1905 to 1906, he commanded Fort Caswell, North Carolina. In September 1905, Reed was advanced to lieutenant colonel. In 1906, he was assigned to command the Artillery District of the Columbia in Oregon. On 17 February 1906, Reed was promoted to brigadier general under the provisions of laws permitting promotion and retirement before age 64 of Union Army veterans who had served for over 40 years. Reed then requested retirement, which was approved on 19 February 1906.

In retirement, Reed resided in San Juan. He was active in the Grand Army of the Republic, Military Order of the Loyal Legion of the United States, Society of the Army of the Cumberland, Sons of the American Revolution, San Juan's American Pioneers of 1898, and the Army and Navy Club of New York City. Reed died in San Juan on 30 November 1930. He was buried in San Juan's Santa María Magdalena de Pazzis Cemetery.

== Works by ==
- Topographical Drawing and Sketching, Including Applications of Photography. New York: John Wiley & Sons. 1886 – via HathiTrust.
- Photography Applied to Surveying. New York: John Wiley & Sons. 1888 – via HathiTrust.
- "Prize Essay: The Terrain In Its Relations To Military Operations". Journal of the Military Service Institution of the United States. Governor's Island, New York: Military Service Institution of the United States. January 1892. pp. 1–53 – via Google Books.
- "Historical Sketch of the Fortifications of San Juan, And The English Attack In 1797". Journal of the United States Artillery. Fort Monroe, Virginia: Artillery School Press. November–December 1901. pp. 229–246 – via Google Books.
- "A Trip To St. Thomas Island, Danish West Indies". Army and Navy Life and the United Service. New York: Army and Navy Press. December 1906. pp. 561–566 – via Google Books.
- "The Barcelona Riots of July, 1909". Journal of the Military Service Institution of the United States. Governor's Island, New York: Military Service Institution of the United States. November–December 1909. pp. 445–463 – via Google Books.
- Spanish Legends and Traditions; Translated from the Originals by Brig. Gen'l Henry A. Reed. Boston: Richard D. Badger. 1914 – via HathiTrust.

=== Legacy ===
In 1941, the army created coast artillery batteries to defend Puerto Rico during World War II. These included Battery Reed, a gun emplacement named for Reed that was located at Fort Amezquita on Isla de Cabras at the mouth of San Juan Bay. This site remained active through the end of the war, and was decommissioned in 1948. The cannons from Battery Reed were later removed, but the battery's casemates and underground passages remain and can be explored by visitors to Isla de Cabras.

== Dates of rank ==
Reed's dates of rank were:

- Private to First Sergeant (United States Volunteers), 14 August 1862 to 19 February 1865
- First Lieutenant (United States Volunteers), 19 February 1865 to 10 June 1865
- Cadet (United States Military Academy), 1 September 1866 to 15 June 1870
- Second Lieutenant, 15 June 1870
- First Lieutenant, 21 May 1875
- Captain, 8 March 1898
- Major, 22 August 1901
- Lieutenant Colonel, 16 September 1905
- Brigadier General, 17 February 1906
- Brigadier General (Retired), 19 February 1906
