= William Story (attorney) =

American judge (1843–1921)

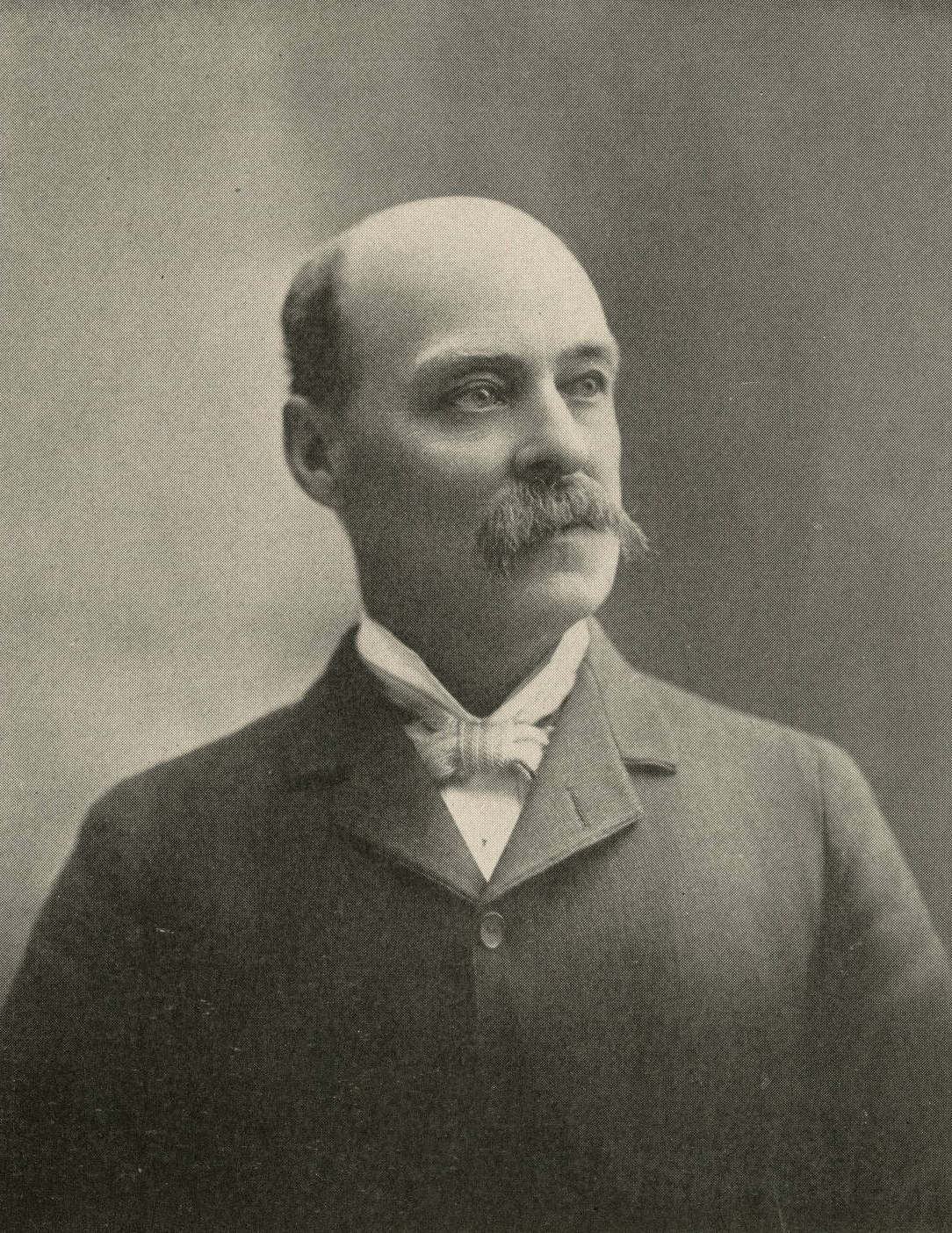

7th Lieutenant Governor of Colorado
- In office 1891–1893
- Governor: John Long Routt
- Preceded by: William Grover Smith
- Succeeded by: David H. Nichols

Judge of the United States District Court for the Western District of Arkansas
- In office March 3, 1871 – June 17, 1874
- Appointed by: Ulysses S. Grant
- Preceded by: Seat established by 16 Stat. 471
- Succeeded by: Isaac C. Parker

Personal details
- Born: William Story; April 4, 1843 Waukesha County, Territory of Wisconsin
- Died: June 20, 1921 (aged 78) Los Angeles, California, U.S.
- Relations: John Patten Story (brother); Henry A. Reed (brother in law)
- Education: University of Michigan

William Story (April 4, 1843 – June 20, 1921) was a United States district judge of the United States District Court for the Western District of Arkansas and later the seventh lieutenant governor of Colorado, serving from 1891 to 1893 under Governor of Colorado John Long Routt.

== Education and career ==
Born in Waukesha County, Wisconsin, Story graduated from the University of Michigan in 1864. He joined the 39th Wisconsin Infantry Regiment of the Union Army as a sergeant and served from 1864 to 1865. He was in private practice in Milwaukee, Wisconsin, from 1865 to 1866, and in Fayetteville, Arkansas, from 1866 to 1867. He was a judge of the Circuit Court of Arkansas for the Second Judicial Circuit Court of Arkansas from 1867 to 1871, sitting as a "special chief justice" of the Arkansas Supreme Court in 1869.

== Federal judicial service ==
Story was nominated by President Ulysses S. Grant on March 3, 1871, to the United States District Court for the Western District of Arkansas, to a new seat authorized by 16 Stat. 471. He was confirmed by the United States Senate on March 3, 1871, and received his commission the same day. His service terminated on June 17, 1874, due to his resignation.

=== Circumstances of his resignation ===
Congress investigated Story in 1874 for, among other things, inordinately large undocumented court expenditures and for allowing bail for persons convicted of capital crimes while they were awaiting sentence. (Note: The committee compared expenditures for the entire state for the three years before the Civil War with expenditures in the Western District for the three years after its creation in 1871, which corresponded with Story's stewardship as district judge. From 1858 through 1860, the average expenditure per year was $20,000 for the entire state. Under Story's tenure the expenditures for the Western District alone averaged more than $241,000 per year. Arkanasas Gazette, June 9, 1874.)

The House committee found that Story's testimony was “lame, disconnected and unsatisfactory.” Within the month after publication of the committee investigation and report in the Arkansas Gazette, Story resigned and moved to Denver, Colorado.

== Later career and death ==
Story then moved to Colorado, settling first in Denver in 1877, and then moving to Ouray. He built up a large law practice, and during his first ten years in practice he served as attorney for the City and County of Denver. He had other interests in mining, banking, building of roads and railroads (Rio Grande Southern). He served as the lieutenant governor of Colorado from 1891 to 1893. In 1913, he moved to Salt Lake City, Utah, where he established a law practice, Story & Steigmeyer. He then relocated to Los Angeles, California, where he died in 1921.

== Sources ==
Legal offices
Preceded by Seat established by 16 Stat. 471	Judge of the United States District Court for the Western District of Arkansas; 1871–1874	Succeeded by Isaac C. Parker
Political offices
Preceded by William Grover Smith	Lieutenant Governor of Colorado; 1891–1893	Succeeded by David H. Nichols
