= George Maledon =

American hangman

George Maledon (June 10, 1830 – June 5, 1911) was an American hangman nicknamed "The Prince of Hangmen", who served in the federal court of Judge Isaac C. Parker.

== Early life ==
Maledon was born on June 10, 1830, in Germany. His family migrated to Detroit, Michigan, while he was still a child. He moved to Fort Smith, Arkansas, soon after his 18th birthday, and began working as a police officer. He held this position for many years. At the outbreak of the Civil War, he enlisted in the Arkansas Light Artillery, serving in the 1st Battalion.

== Career ==
After the war's end, Maledon returned to Fort Smith, where he began working as a night guard in the federal jail. Records indicate that Maledon supervised executions from the mid-1880s until 1891, and then again in 1894. Maledon carried dual revolvers around and who ever tried to escape was killed by his gun. Maledon was not the only jailer who participated in the executions. Contemporary newspaper accounts mention other jailers as well.

== In popular culture ==
Remembered today as the "prince of Hangmen", Maledon's actual work at Fort Smith is much more difficult to document. He stopped working for the federal court in 1894, and began traveling the area with a tent display showing gallows relics, including nooses and photographs of the men who died on the gallows. The 1899 publication of "Hell on the Border" documented Maledon's ties to the executions of the Federal Court, and first bestowed the title of "prince of hangmen". Maledon is mentioned in the novel True Grit, by Charles Portis.

== Death ==
In 1905, in failing health, Maledon entered an "Old Soldiers Home" in Humboldt, Tennessee. Maledon died in 1911, just shy of his 81st birthday, of natural causes. He is buried in the Johnson City Cemetery.
