= Fort Smith National Historic Site =

US National Historic Site in Arkansas

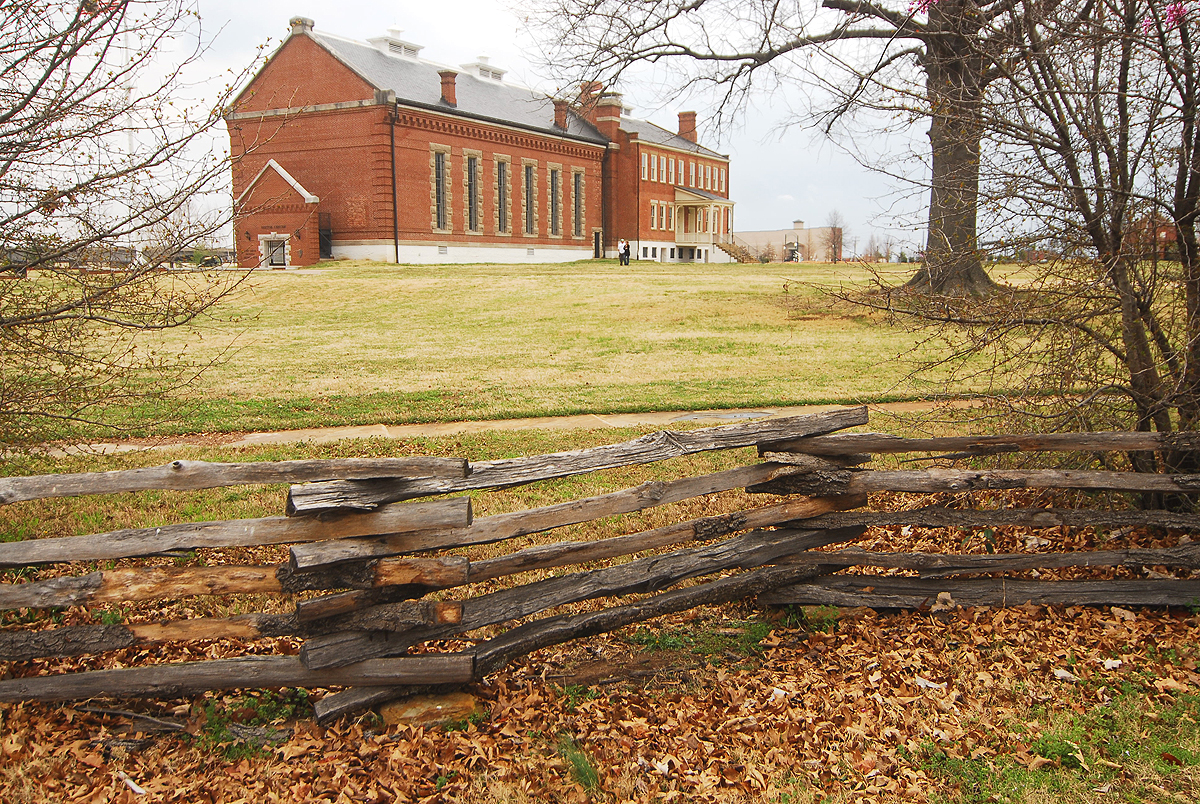
- Fort Smith National Historic Site in 2009

- Location within Arkansas Location within the United States
- Location: Sebastian County, Arkansas
- Nearest city: Fort Smith, Arkansas
- Coordinates: 35°23′18″N 94°25′47″W
- Area: 75 acres (30 ha)
- Established: September 13, 1961
- Visitors: 106,953 (in 2025)
- Governing body: National Park Service
- Website: Fort Smith National Historic Site

U.S. National Register of Historic Places
- Designated: October 15, 1966
- Reference no.: 66000202

U.S. National Historic Landmark District
- Designated: December 19, 1960

Fort Smith National Historic Site is a National Historic Site located in Fort Smith, Arkansas, along the Arkansas River. The first fort at this site was established by the United States in 1817, before this area was established as part of Indian Territory. It was later replaced and the second fort was operated by the US until 1871. This site was designated as a National Historic Landmark in 1961.

The fort was an early site of the United States District Court for the Western District of Arkansas, which had jurisdiction over western Arkansas and all of Indian Territory. Court operations began at the recently abandoned fort in November, 1872, Judge William Story, presiding. This court is best known for the two decade tenure of Judge Isaac C. Parker. The town of Fort Smith, Arkansas developed around the fort.

== Description ==
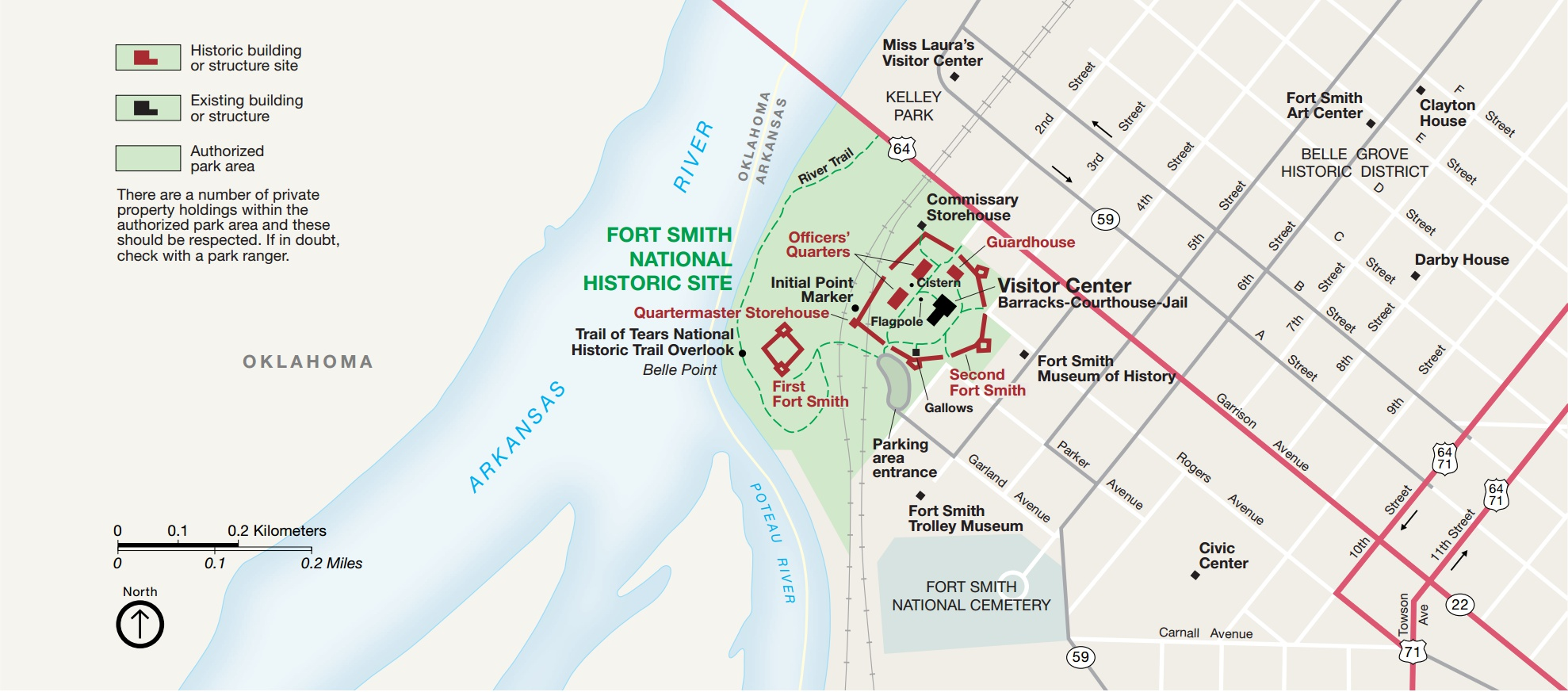
Fort Smith park map

The site includes the second historic fort constructed at this place. In addition, located on the grounds are the foundation remains of the first Fort Smith (1817–1824), the commissary building (c. 1838) and a reconstruction of the gallows used by the federal court. A walking trail along the Arkansas River includes wayside exhibits on the Trail of Tears.

Congress authorized acquisition of land on the Oklahoma bank of the Arkansas River to be included in the National Historic Site, in order to preserve a historic viewshed, but it has not been acquired.

The park visitor center is now located in the old Barracks/Courthouse/Jail building. Exhibits in the visitor center focus on Fort Smith's military history from 1817 to 1871, its role in the western expansion of the United States, Federal District Judge Isaac C. Parker and the federal courts' effects on justice in Indian Territory, the U.S. Deputy Marshals and outlaws, Federal Indian policy, and Indian Removal, including the Cherokee Trail of Tears.

== History ==
The site was established in 1961 in order to protect the remains of two 19th-century U.S. military forts, including a building that once housed the United States District Court for the Western District of Arkansas, which had jurisdiction over federal cases in Indian Territory. Fort Smith was also notable as a major stop for the Choctaw and Cherokee people along the "Trail of Tears." during the period of Indian Removal from the Southeast. It was designated a National Historic Landmark in 1961.

The original fort was established on December 25, 1817, by Major William Bradford in order to maintain harmony between the local Osage Indians, who had long been dominant in this territory, and a band of Cherokee who had migrated west, under pressure from European Americans, from their traditional territory in the Southeast. This time would later be historically referenced as the "First Fort." It ended in 1824 when the U.S. Army abandoned Fort Smith after constructing Fort Gibson further west.

Fort Smith, pictured about 1854, from Reports of explorations and surveys to ascertain the most practicable and economical route for a railroad from the Mississippi River to the Pacific Ocean, volume III

As a result of the increased tensions Indians following the Indian Removal Act of 1830, and local white settlers who encroached on their territory, the U.S. Army created a second Fort Smith in 1838 near the original's ruins. This is the beginning of the historical "Second Fort" period. During General Zachary Taylor's command of the fort in the 1840s, it became a supply depot for other forts within the Indian Territory. It was captured during the Civil War from Confederate forces in 1863 by Union troops. The majority of the Cherokee and other Five Civilized Tribes had initially allied with the Confederacy, and supplied warriors to its forces. The fort continued in use as a supply depot to other forts in the region until it was no longer occupied in an official capacity by 1871; historically the end of the "Second Fort" era.

== Site of the Federal Court ==
As often happened, a small town developed around the fort, with people attracted for business. In addition, Congress created the United States District Court for the Western District of Arkansas on March 3, 1851. Daniel Ringo was the first Judge appointed to the bench. Initial court operations were located in Van Buren, Arkansas. This court remained busy as it enforced federal law in both western Arkansas and Indian Territory. Additionally, it had jurisdiction in crimes involving United States citizens, whether they were the perpetrator or the victim. Court activity continued in this location until interrupted by the Civil War.

Following the Civil War, court operations were reestablished in Van Buren before moving to Fort Smith in 1872. Initially, court was held in the Rogers building in downtown Fort Smith. Judge William Story presided over the first day of court in Fort Smith on May 8, 1871.

After the destruction of the Rogers building in a fire, United States Marshal Logan Roots received permission to move onto the recently vacated military reservation in late 1872. Court was held for the first time on the fort property on November 18, 1872. 1873 and 1874 saw more change as Congress responded to the outcome of an 1872 gunfight in Goingsnake District of the Cherokee Nation, an investigation into the finances of U.S. Marshal Roots, and bribery charges against Judge Story. The attention given the district led to the resignations of both Roots and Story in 1873 and 1874, respectively.

United States Representative Isaac C. Parker, a Republican from Missouri, had a history of interest in the business of the federal court in Fort Smith. In 1874, President Ulysses H. Grant appointed Parker to be the chief justice for Utah Territory. Parker, seeing the events in Fort Smith, requested instead to be appointed to the bench in the Western District of Arkansas. Grant acquiesced to the request and Parker was confirmed by Congress, with his appointment effective on March 19, 1875.

The 36-year-old judge opened court on May 10, 1875, barely a week after his arrival in Fort Smith. His twenty years on the bench, most of it at "the Old Fort," cemented his name in Western history. There are a variety of stories regarding his actions on the bench and his control of the court and the district. Regardless of the truth in these stories, or lack thereof, his tenure from 1875 to 1896 is still part of the legend that has grown around him, "Parker's Ironmen," and Fort Smith.

== Image gallery ==
Arkansas in the American Civil War gallery

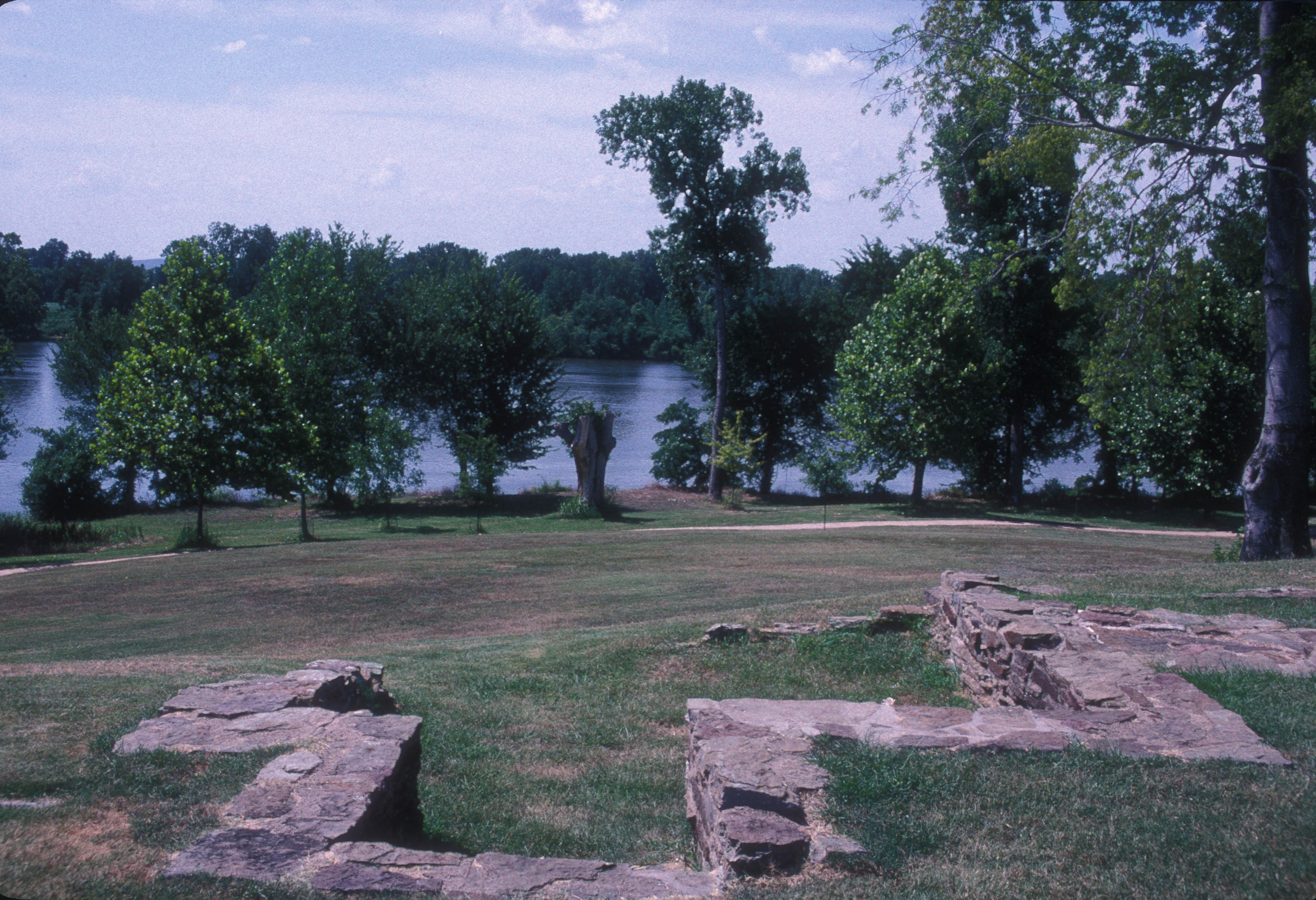
Site of the first fort erected in 1818

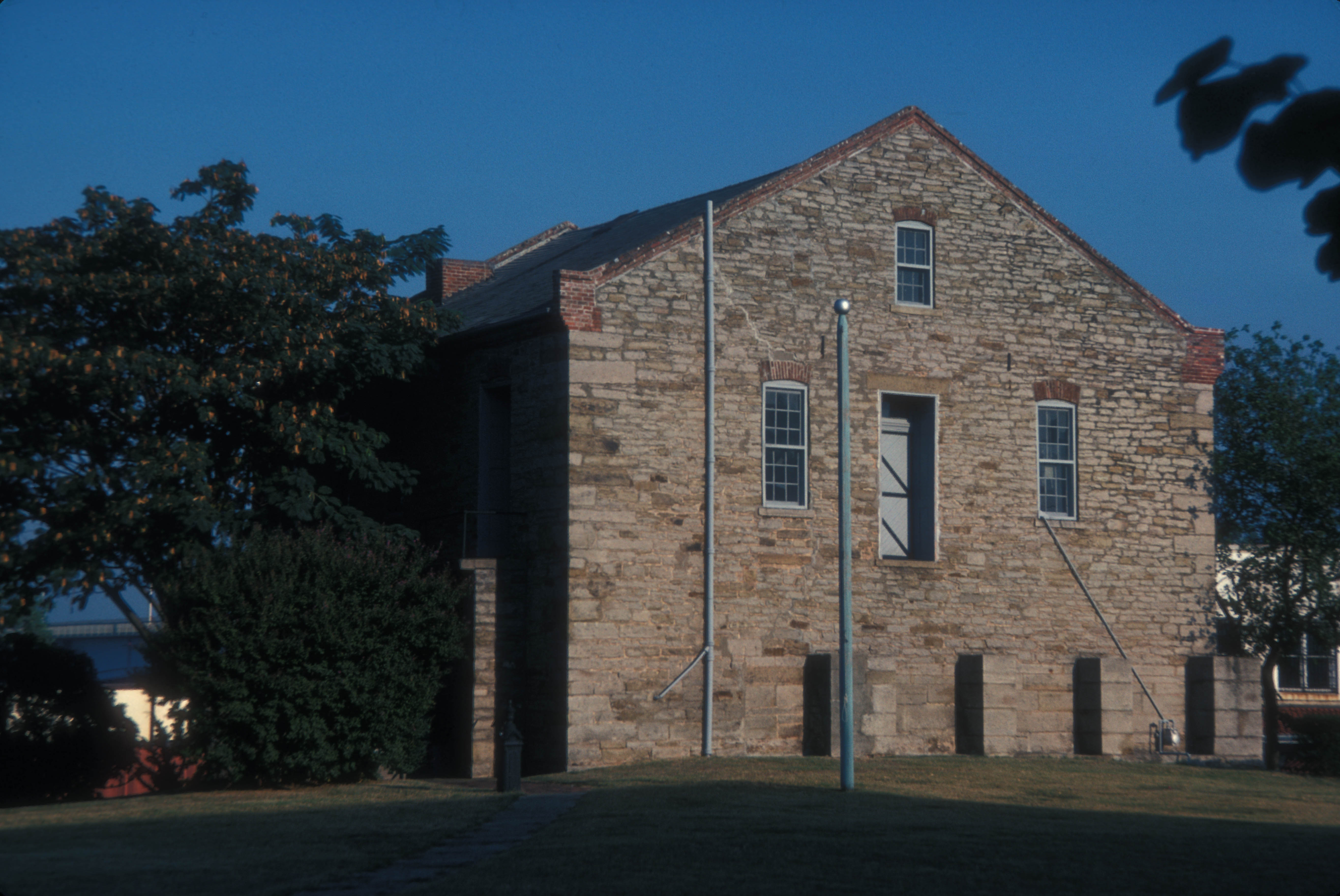
Commissary Building

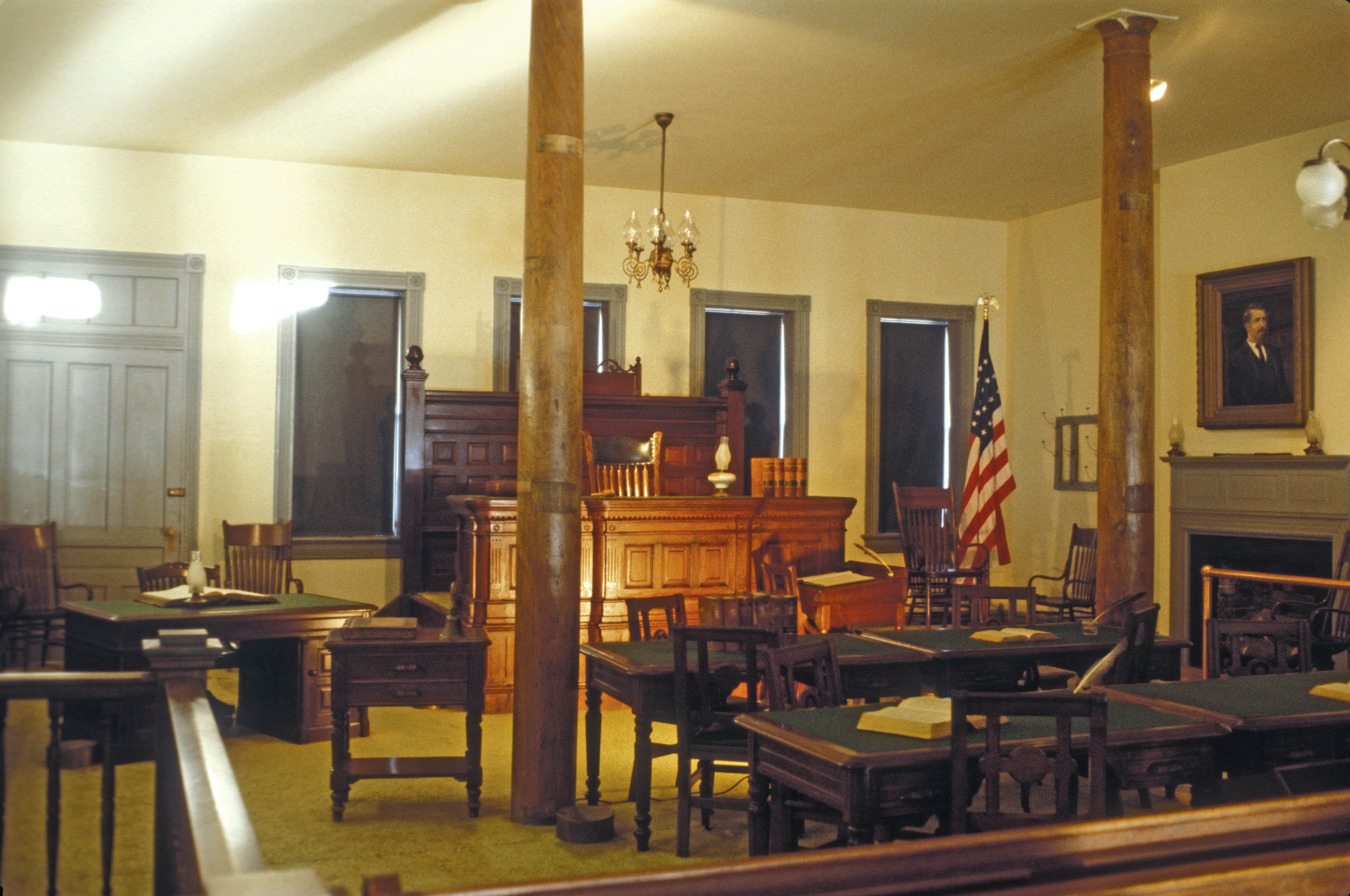
Judge Parker's courtroom

== See also ==
- Indian Council at Fort Smith
- List of National Historic Landmarks in Arkansas
- National Register of Historic Places listings in Sebastian County, Arkansas
