= Chester teapot =

Attraction in Chester, West Virginia, U.S.

Coordinates: 40.616119°N 80.557249°W

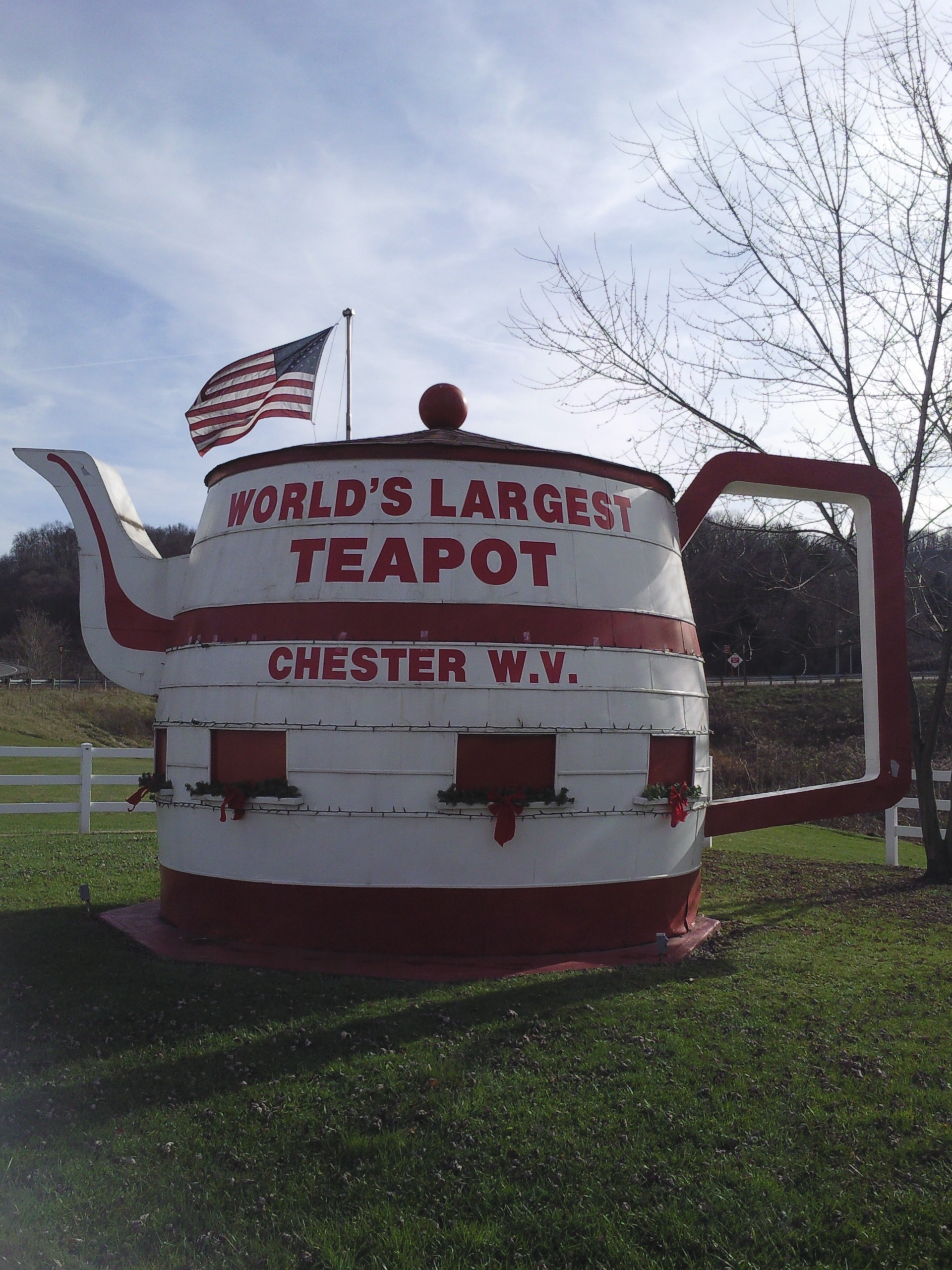
The Chester teapot

The Chester teapot is billed as the "World's Largest Teapot", which measures 14 feet (4.3 m) in height by 14 feet (4.3 m) in diameter. Its current location is on the former site of a popular amusement park, Rock Springs Park (1897–1970), off an onramp along U.S. Highway 30 in the City of Chester in Hancock County, West Virginia.

== History ==
It was originally brought to Chester in 1938 to represent the largest pottery industry in the world at that time. The teapot was originally a Hires Root Beer sign in the shape of a large barrel and was converted into a teapot upon its arrival in Chester. The teapot underwent restorations in 1990 and 2007 by the citizens of Chester. By coincidence Charles Elmer Hires' root beer may also have had its inspiration in a kind of herbal tea.

== Gallery ==
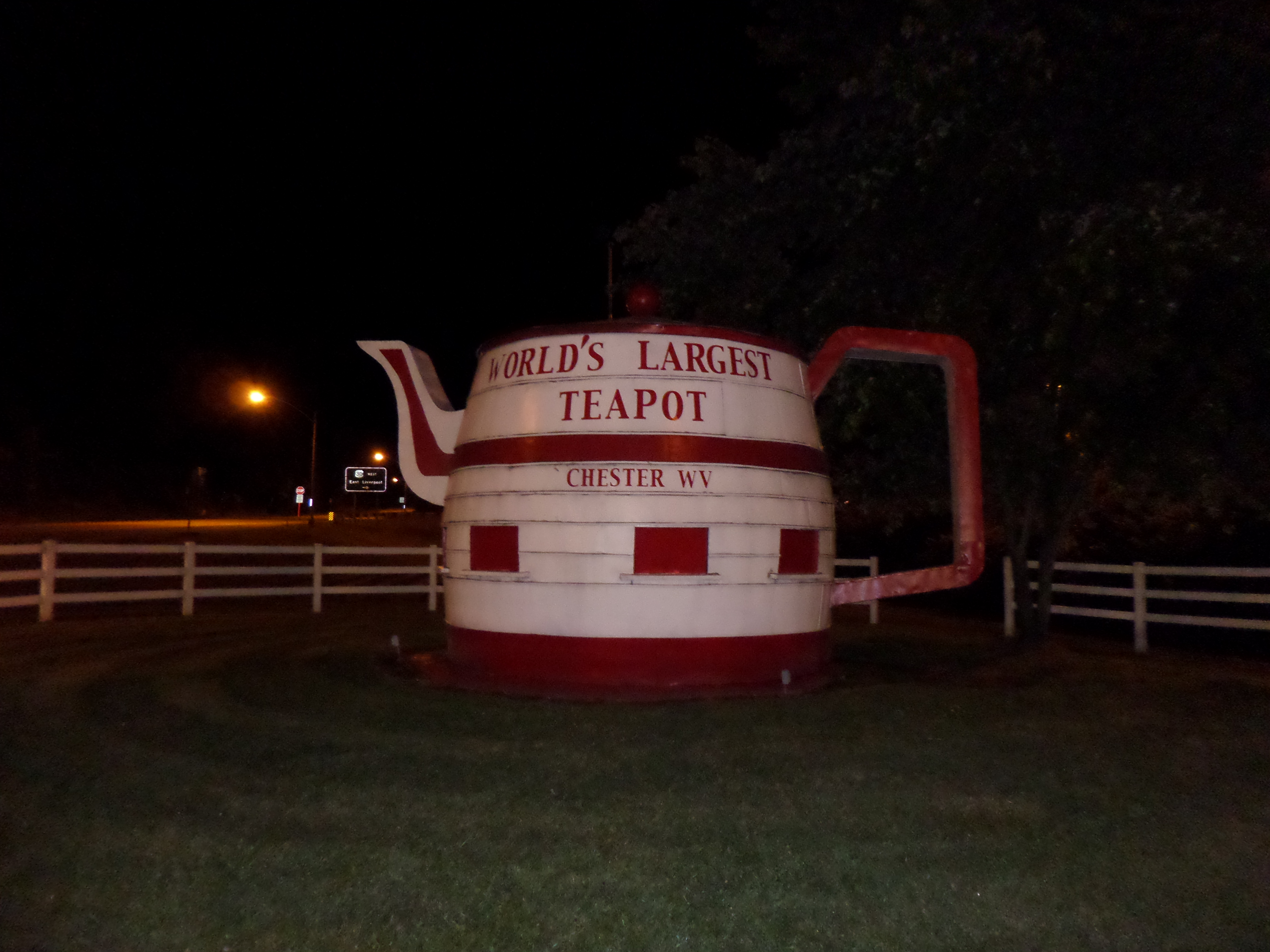
The Chester Teapot at night (2013)

== Popular culture ==
- The Chester teapot is a location in Fallout 76, as The Giant Teapot.

== See also ==
- American tea culture
- Teapot Dome Service Station
