= 1864 Arkansas gubernatorial election =

- March 14, 1864
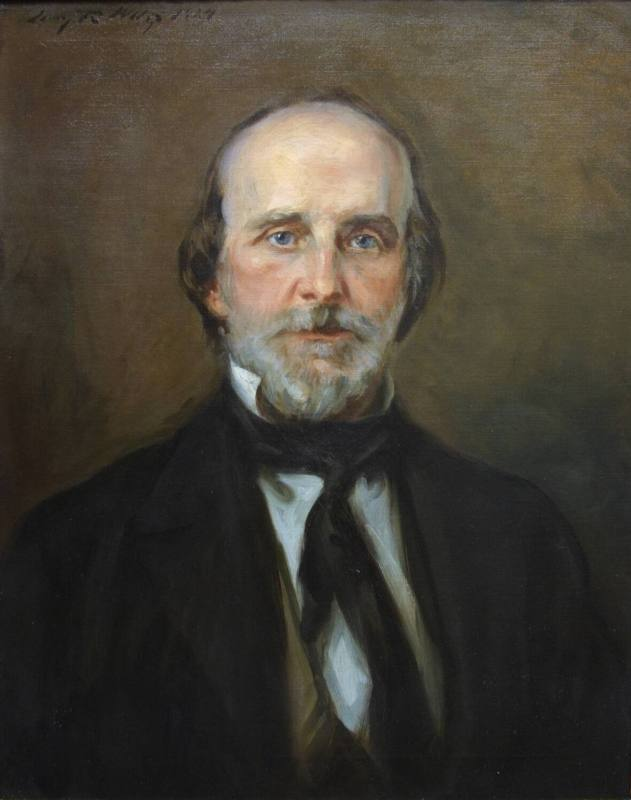
Candidate	Isaac Murphy
Party	Independent
Popular vote	12,418
Percentage	99.80%
Governor before election
Isaac Murphy (Provisional Governor)
Independent
Elected Governor
Isaac Murphy
Independent

The 1864 Arkansas gubernatorial election was held on March 14, 1864, in order to elect the Union governor of Arkansas. Independent nominee and incumbent Provisional Governor Isaac Murphy won the election as he ran unopposed.

== Civil War ==
Following the fall of Little Rock to Union forces on September 10, 1863, Confederate Governor Harris Flanagin established a Government in exile at Washington, Arkansas. Meanwhile, the occupation authorities of the Union Army, consisting of the Unionist constitutional convention, appointed former member of the Arkansas Senate Isaac Murphy as the Provisional Governor of Arkansas on January 20, 1864. However, Murphy refused to exercise his power as Governor, until the constitution was ratified and he was elected by popular vote. The popular vote election was held on March 14, 1864, with the approval of President Lincoln.

== General election ==
On election day, March 14, 1864, Independent nominee Isaac Murphy won the election unopposed with 12,418 votes, thereby retaining Independent control over the office of Governor. Murphy was sworn in for his first elected term on April 18, 1864.

=== Results ===
1864 Arkansas gubernatorial Union election
Party	Candidate	Votes	%
Independent	Isaac Murphy (incumbent)	12,418	99.80
	Scattering	25	0.20
Total votes		12,443	100.00
Independent hold			

== Bibliography ==
Sobel, Robert (1978). Biographical directory of the governors of the United States, 1789-1978, Vol. I. Meckler Books. ISBN 9780930466015.
