= Roadstown, New Jersey =

Populated place in Cumberland County, New Jersey, US

- Unincorporated community
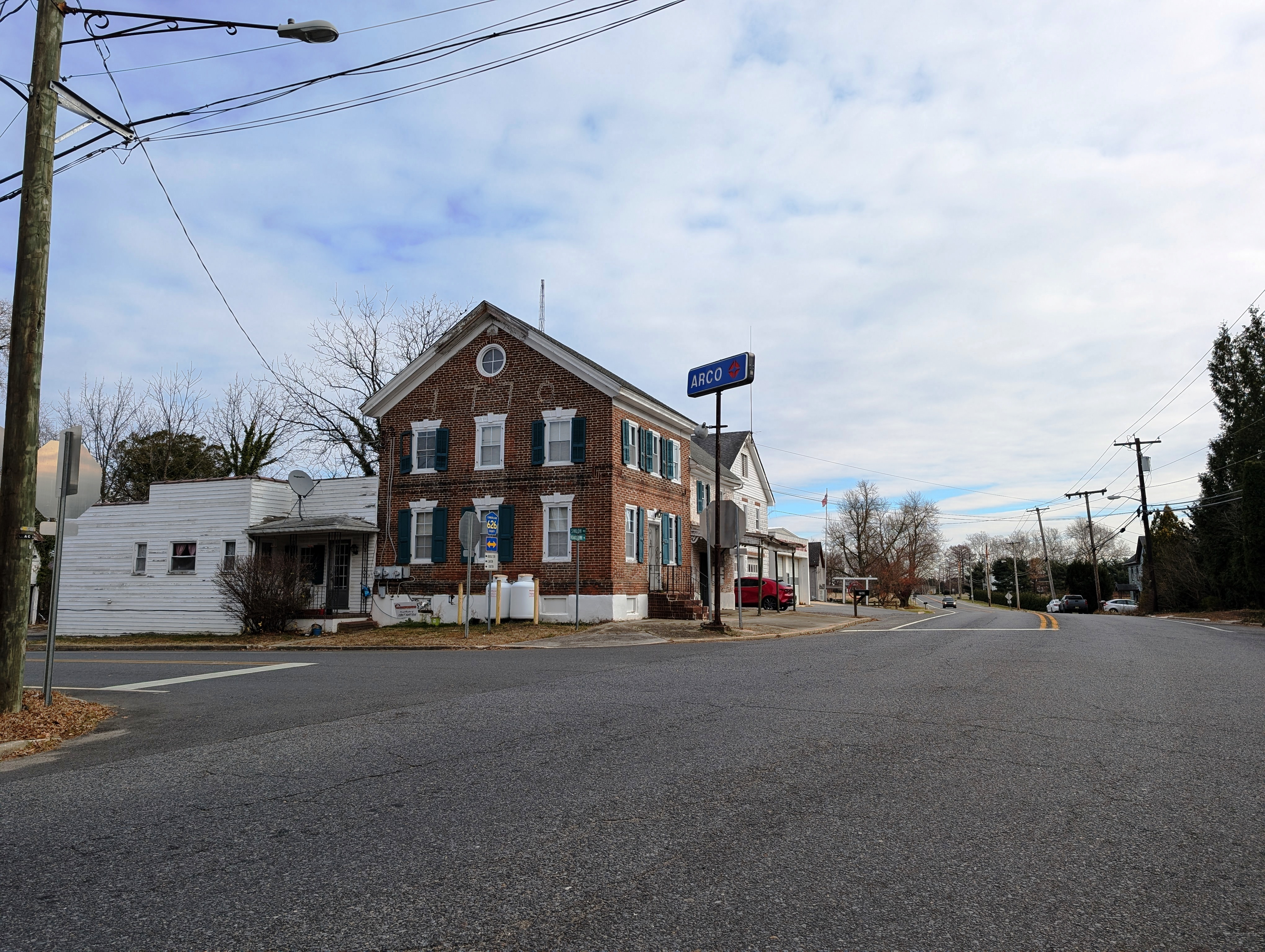
- Ananias Sayre House at the center of Roadstown

- Location in Cumberland County Location in New Jersey Location in the United States
- Coordinates: 39°26′27″N 75°19′06″W
- Country: United States
- State: New Jersey
- County: Cumberland
- Township: Stow Creek

Area
  - Total: 0.83 sq mi (2.16 km^{2})
  - Land: 0.83 sq mi (2.16 km^{2})
  - Water: 0 sq mi (0.00 km^{2})
- Elevation: 115 ft (35 m)

Population (2020)
  - Total: 155
  - Density: 185/sq mi (71.6/km^{2})
- Time zone: UTC−05:00 (Eastern (EST))
  - Summer (DST): UTC−04:00 (EDT)
- FIPS code: 34-63810
- GNIS feature ID: 879728

Roadstown is an unincorporated community located within Stow Creek Township, in Cumberland County, in the U.S. state of New Jersey.

As of the 2020 census, Roadstown had a population of 155.

Roadstown is located at the intersection of County Route 620 and 626, approximately 3 mi (4.8 km) southwest of Shiloh.

== Demographics ==
Historical population
Census	Pop.	Note	%±
2020	155		—
U.S. Decennial Census

Roadstown was first listed as a census designated place in the 2020 U.S. census.

Roadstown CDP, New Jersey – Racial and ethnic composition Note: the US Census treats Hispanic/Latino as an ethnic category. This table excludes Latinos from the racial categories and assigns them to a separate category. Hispanics/Latinos may be of any race.
Race / Ethnicity (NH = Non-Hispanic)	Pop 2020	2020
White alone (NH)	126	81.29%
Black or African American alone (NH)	1	0.65%
Native American or Alaska Native alone (NH)	8	5.16%
Asian alone (NH)	4	2.58%
Native Hawaiian or Pacific Islander alone (NH)	0	0.00%
Other race alone (NH)	0	0.00%
Mixed race or Multiracial (NH)	7	4.52%
Hispanic or Latino (any race)	9	5.81%
Total	155	100.00%

== History ==
Prior to the American Revolution, Roadstown was considered an important settlement in the region. Roadstown was then known as "Sayre's Cross-Roads" or "Sayre's Corners", named for Ananias Sayre, "a leading citizen" and county sheriff. Maskell Ware settled in Roadstown in 1789, where he worked as a farmer and manufacturer of hand-made chairs. Ware chairs are today considered collector's items.

The Cohansey Baptist Church relocated to Roadstown in 1802. Established in 1683, it is today the third oldest Baptist church in New Jersey. A post office was established in 1803. In 1834, Roadstown had a tavern, two stores, 20 dwellings, and "was peopled principally by the cultivators of the soil". By 1882, the population had grown to 200.

== Education ==
For elementary school, Hopewell Township students are zoned to Hopewell Township School District, while Stow Creek Township students are zoned to Stow Creek Township School District. All students are in the Cumberland Regional School District (for high school).

The Stow Creek school district and the Greenwich Township School District have a cooperative agreement in which all students in grade levels Kindergarten through 4 in both school districts attend the Greenwich Township school facility, Morris Goodwin School, while all students in grades 5–8 in both school districts attend the Stow Creek school facility, Stow Creek School.

== Notable people ==
People who were born in, residents of, or otherwise closely associated with Roadstown include:

- Harris Flanagin (1817–1874), politician and lawyer who served as the 7th governor of Arkansas
- Charles Elmer Hires (1851–1937), inventor of root beer and namesake of Hires Root Beer
