= Arkansas Peace Society =

Defunct organization based in Arkansas, Confederate States

- Counties with a Peace Society presence
- Founded: probably spring 1861
- Dissolved: 1861
- Type: Secret society
- Location: Confederate States
- Origins: Arkansas’s secession
- Region served: Northern Arkansas
- Members: ~1,700

The Arkansas Peace Society, or the Peace Society, was a secret society that formed in Northern Arkansas in 1861 in response to the secession of Arkansas from the Union. The Peace Society was organized as a mutual aid society and to prevent the war from affecting Northern Arkansas, although members gave conflicting testimony as to what exactly it was organized to protect. Fearing that the society constituted a rebellious pact, it was quickly targeted by law enforcement and apparently ceased operations by the end of the year. Many arrested members agreed to join the Confederate States Army to avoid punishment. One unit formed from Peace Society members had an abnormal amount of desertions.

== Background ==
The only vote against the secession of Arkansas was Isaac Murphy's mountainous Fayetteville based district. While the majority of residents of the mountains supported secession, a strong minority held Union loyalties. Up to 90% of the 8,000 Arkansans who joined the Union Army came from the mountains.

== Origin ==
It is not known who created the Peace Society and when, but it may have been operating slightly before the Arkansas secession convention in May 1861. That summer, several members of a society called Pro Bono Publico were arrested and investigated in Northern Arkansas. Their organization, like the Peace Society, had a constitution, but members were cleared of potential charges of treason. The Peace Society was operating in Izard County "forty or fifty days" before 21 November. Some members believed that it had a headquarters, although no such thing was ever identified. Their oaths and rules were orally transmitted; the only documentation of it came from Confederate authorities, who assembled several slightly different oaths taken by members. Despite accusations in the Southern press of Northern or abolitionist origin, that claim was unsubstantiated.

240 members are known by name, with 1,700 estimated to have existed. Contemporary Southern press postulated that there were 2,200 members. Its members were mostly poor and all were slaveless. It had six preacher members (four United Missionary Baptist, two Methodist Episcopal) who were active promoters of membership. The principal purpose of the organization was protection from feared incursion from the Confederate government. The Peace Society was active in Van Buren, Izard, Carroll, Fulton, Marion, and Searcy counties.

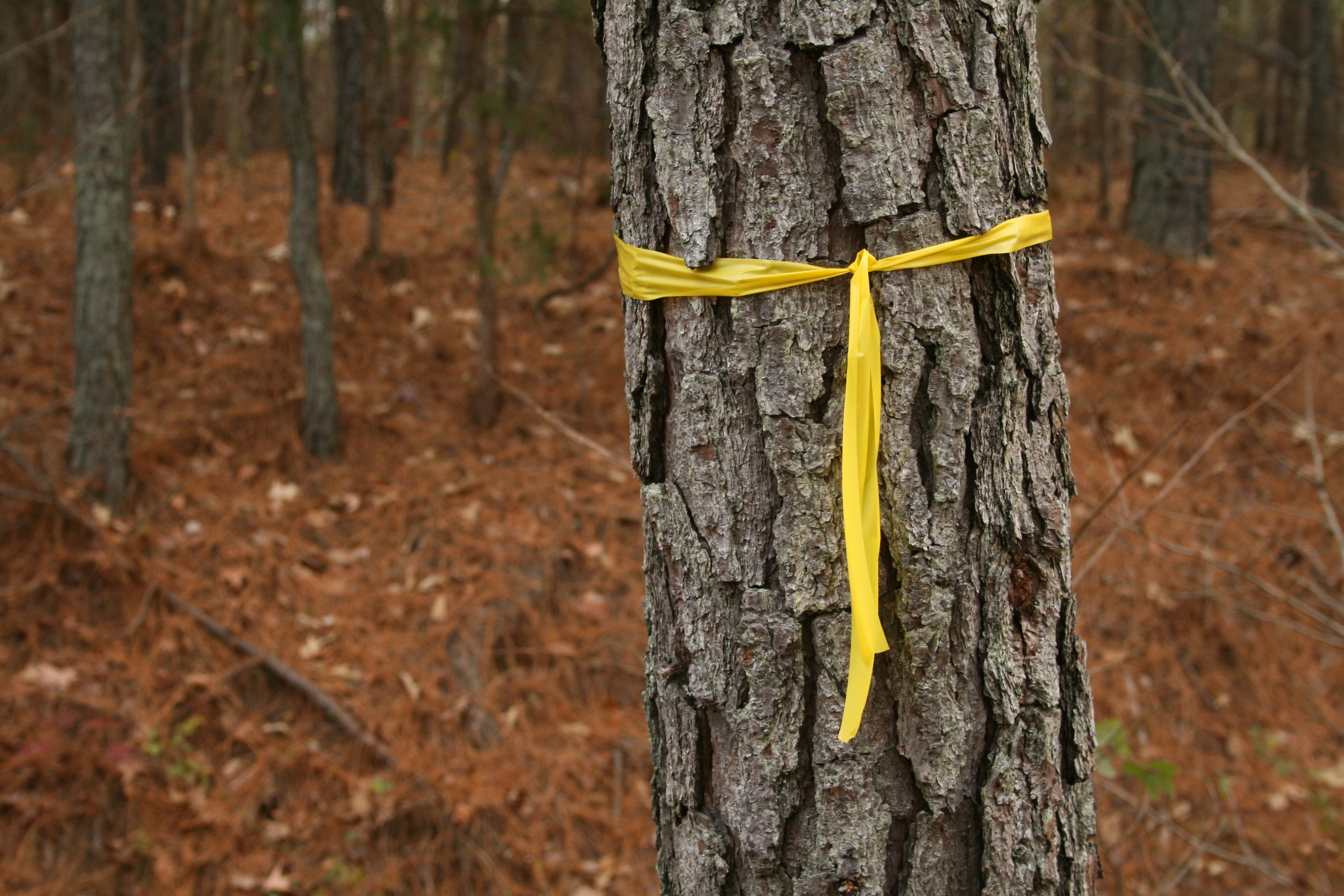
Members of the Peace Society used yellow ribbons on their houses to signal membership.

=== Secret signs ===
Members communicated with secret signs. They placed a yellow ribbon or rag on a member's house during meetings or to signal membership when the occupant was away. Signs performed with the hands included one in which the three fingers of the left hand were placed across the nose. This sign was answered by feeling the underside of the chin with the hand. Another sign was to place one finger in the shirt collar, which was answered by putting the right hand on the left breast. The third sign was to raise the back of one's hat with one hand and place that hand on the back of the head. This sign was answered by turning one's back to that person.

Spoken signs included call and response. One was: "It was a very dark night" which was to be responded, "Not so dark as it will be in the morning." "Secession" was answered "in the Southern Confederacy."

=== Oath ===
One version of the oath taken read,

I do Solemnly Swear before almity god and these witnesses that I will and truly keep all the secrets of this Society that I will ever hole and all ways conceal and never Reveal anything in connexion there with and that I will on the Shortest notice go to the assistance of any Brother at the peril of my life so help me god second as it is a matter of life and death who shall betray to our Enemies the Existance of this Society he shall forfeit his life and it shall be the duty [of] this society having Received knowledge of such traitor to inform the Brethern Each of whose duty it shall be to procure such Traitor and take his life at the peril of his own. [sic]

== Persecution ==
Throughout 1861, Unionist societies had been growing across the South. They were not viewed as a threat until acts of sabotage began. After a bridge in Tennessee was burned on 8 November, Unionists in Arkansas were suddenly suspect to scrutiny. On 17 November 1861, vigilantes began arresting alleged Unionists in Clinton. The Van Buren county militia of 100 men was called in to continue arrests. 27 arrests were made. On learning that the society was discovered, a member involved in state politics, Jehoiada J. Ware of Fulton County, took 39 society members from Lunenburg (then Rocky Bayou) with him to Rolla, Missouri to join the Union Army, a path taken by other members throughout the duration of their prosecution into December. Ware's flight to Missouri was noticed by locals, and members of the public began arrests in Izard County on either 18 or 19 November, arresting 57.

Commander of the Searcy County militia, Colonel Samuel Leslie, had recently written to governor Rector assuring him of the loyalty of Searcy County. He was shocked to find the presence of what was alleged to be an anti-Confederate society. On 22 November he ordered his militia to join with locals performing arrests. After arresting 50 members, they told him about the details of the society, and that they estimated that there were 1,700 members. He and other Confederate authorities were disturbed by the clause in the oath pertaining to the swearing to secrecy on pain of death, finding it indicative of an imminent rebellion. John Rice Homer Scott, commander of the Pope County Volunteer Cavalry, rode along the Missouri border and arrested more members, sending his prisoners to the same jail Colonel Leslie held his prisoners. A measles outbreak, as well as orders from governor Rector for the prisoners to be tried in Little Rock, prompted Leslie to order a chain to be cast for prisoners to walk as a single file chain gang to Little Rock for trial. Dozens were excluded from the trip because they had caught measles, and 77 made the journey. They were guarded on the way by 100 soldiers.

== Trial and aftermath ==
There is no definitive count of how many members of the Peace Society were tried across the state and what their names were. 117 were tried in Little Rock. All but 15 agreed to join the Confederate Army instead of going to trial, mostly serving in the same company of the 2nd Arkansas Infantry Regiment. They were given officers who were tasked with preventing desertions, although by war's end the company had an abnormally high rate of desertion. The 15 who did not join, then subjected to a trial, were found innocent of treason despite the jurors being prosperous merchants and planters from central and southern Arkansas. It was determined that the society was not actually a threat, nor was it intending to be one. Testimony from members gave diverse accounts of their reasons for joining. Members variously stated that they joined to support the Union, the Confederacy, or to avoid service in either. Its constitution made no actual mention of government, and stated its cause as self-preservation and mutual protection. To the extent that the Peace Society was abolitionist, it was because of its dislike of the planter class.

Testimony from members showed that many members were ignorant, misinformed, or forgetful of essential details about the society, including the oath, the details of the secret signs, and especially the purpose of the organization. Peace Society members who got off without punishment remained unmolested by their neighbors throughout the war. In the 1890s, some veterans of the Peace Society asked for pensions from the federal government, claiming to have been pro-Union partisan fighters.

== Bibliography ==
- Johnston, James J. (2018). Mountain Feds: Arkansas Unionists and the Peace Society. Little Rock: Butler Center Books.
