= 1862 Arkansas gubernatorial election =

- October 6, 1862
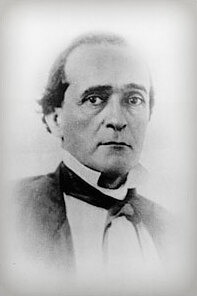

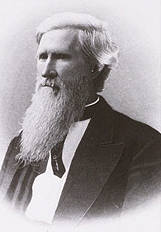
Candidate	Harris Flanagin	Henry M. Rector
Party	Independent	Independent Democrat
Alliance	Democratic
Popular vote	18,149 (Note: Flanagin is stated as having received 18,139 votes, however, the number of votes in each county adds up to 18,149.)	7,419
Percentage	68.06%	27.82%
- Flanagin: 40%-50% 50%-60% 60%-70% 70%-80% 80%-90% 90%-100% Rector: 40%-50% 50%-60% 60%-70% 80%-90% Patterson: 30%-40% No votes
Governor before election
Henry M. Rector
Independent Democrat
Elected Governor
Harris Flanagin
Independent

The 1862 Arkansas gubernatorial election was the ninth gubernatorial election, held on Monday, October 6, 1862. In the midst of the American Civil War, Colonel Harris Flanagin easily defeated incumbent Governor Henry M. Rector and Independent candidate John S. H. Rainey with 68.06% of the vote. Flanagin took office as the seventh governor on November 15, 1862.

It was the only gubernatorial election conducted following the adoption of Arkansas's second constitution. The Democratic Party did not field a candidate and endorsed Flanagin. A new state constitution had been adopted, cutting two years off Rector's term.

== Background ==
Arkansas politics had been dominated by members of the powerful Conway-Johnson family (known as "The Family") since the territorial period. Henry Rector was a member of this family, and owed his ascent in politics to family connections, but The Family passed over him as a candidate in the 1860 Arkansas gubernatorial election. Rector then ran as an outsider candidate, with the support of the anti-Family faction. Rector's election coincided with the secession crisis, and Arkansas left the Union in May, 1861, joining the Confederate States of America shortly thereafter. However, Rector proved an incompetent and unpopular governor, and he failed to manage the military situation in Arkansas effectively. The Family then focused their efforts on supporting Harris Flanagin in an effort to unseat Rector.

Flanagin won by an overwhelming margin. Bitter at being defeated, Rector then resigned from office, leaving Thomas Fletcher to serve the remaining two weeks of his term.

== Results ==
1862 Arkansas gubernatorial election
Party	Candidate	Votes	%
Independent	Harris Flanagin	18,149	68.06
Independent Democrat	Henry M. Rector (incumbent)	7,419	27.82
Independent	John S. H. Rainey	738 (Note: Rainey is stated as receiving 708 votes, however, the number of votes in each county adds up to 738.)	2.77
Write-in	William K. Patterson	248	0.93%
Write-in	Scattering	112	0.42%
Total votes		26,666	100.0

=== Results by county ===
Results by county
County	Flanagin		Rector		Rainey		Patterson		Scattering		Total
County	Votes	%	Votes	%	Votes	%	Votes	%	Votes	%	Total
Arkansas	333	80.63%	80	19.37%	0	0.00%	0	0.00%	0	0.00%	413
Ashley	455	73.03%	125	20.06%	43	6.90%	0	0.00%	0	0.00%	623
Benton	235	53.05%	102	23.02%	0	0.00%	0	0.00%	106	23.93%	443
Bradley	259	36.89%	438	62.39%	5	0.71%	0	0.00%	0	0.00%	702
Calhoun	178	60.75%	104	35.49%	11	3.75%	0	0.00%	0	0.00%	293
Carroll	414	83.30%	81	16.30%	2	0.40%	0	0.00%	0	0.00%	497
Chicot	139	59.15%	92	39.15%	4	1.70%	0	0.00%	0	0.00%	235
Clark	737	92.59%	46	5.78%	13	1.63%	0	0.00%	0	0.00%	796
Columbia	293	34.63%	536	63.36%	17	2.01%	0	0.00%	0	0.00%	846
Conway	278	58.77%	169	35.73%	26	5.50%	0	0.00%	0	0.00%	473
Craighead	177	57.10%	54	17.42%	0	0.00%	79	25.48%	0	0.00%	310
Crawford	413	78.37%	67	12.71%	47	8.92%	0	0.00%	0	0.00%	527
Crittenden	No votes										
Dallas	446	89.74%	48	9.66%	3	0.60%	0	0.00%	0	0.00%	497
Desha	187	64.48%	102	35.17%	1	0.34%	0	0.00%	0	0.00%	290
Drew	377	52.43%	321	44.65%	21	2.92%	0	0.00%	0	0.00%	719
Franklin	311	84.97%	48	13.11%	7	1.91%	0	0.00%	0	0.00%	366
Fulton	153	61.45%	96	38.55%	0	0.00%	0	0.00%	0	0.00%	249
Greene	No votes										
Hempstead	549	70.47%	223	28.63%	7	0.90%	0	0.00%	0	0.00%	779
Hot Spring	424	88.70%	53	11.09%	1	0.21%	0	0.00%	0	0.00%	478
Independence	589	84.14%	111	15.86%	0	0.00%	0	0.00%	0	0.00%	700
Izard	316	78.22%	88	21.78%	0	0.00%	0	0.00%	0	0.00%	404
Jackson	609	82.52%	127	17.21%	2	0.27%	0	0.00%	0	0.00%	738
Jefferson	422	48.73%	431	49.77%	12	1.39%	0	0.00%	1	0.12%	866
Johnson	281	53.32%	244	46.30%	2	0.38%	0	0.00%	0	0.00%	527
Lafayette	263	56.32%	178	38.12%	25	5.35%	0	0.00%	1	0.21%	467
Lawrence	436	76.22%	121	21.15%	9	1.57%	6	1.05%	0	0.00%	572
Madison	289	83.77%	56	16.23%	0	0.00%	0	0.00%	0	0.00%	345
Marion	344	72.73%	129	27.27%	0	0.00%	0	0.00%	0	0.00%	473
Mississippi	No votes										
Monroe	No votes										
Montgomery	256	94.12%	14	5.15%	2	0.74%	0	0.00%	0	0.00%	272
Newton	148	60.16%	98	39.84%	0	0.00%	0	0.00%	0	0.00%	246
Ouachita	284	31.31%	434	47.85%	189	20.84%	0	0.00%	0	0.00%	907
Perry	77	64.71%	32	26.89%	10	8.40%	0	0.00%	0	0.00%	119
Phillips	No votes										
Pike	195	68.90%	64	22.61%	24	8.48%	0	0.00%	0	0.00%	283
Poinsett	27	11.34%	209	87.82%	0	0.00%	0	0.00%	2	0.84%	238
Polk	241	73.70%	85	25.99%	1	0.31%	0	0.00%	0	0.00%	327
Pope	447	83.55%	64	11.96%	24	4.49%	0	0.00%	0	0.00%	535
Prairie	892	79.36%	175	15.57%	57	5.07%	0	0.00%	0	0.00%	1,124
Pulaski	581	69.33%	229	27.33%	27	3.22%	0	0.00%	1	0.12%	838
Randolph	122	29.61%	127	30.83%	0	0.00%	163	39.56%	0	0.00%	412
Saline	423	75.27%	123	21.89%	16	2.85%	0	0.00%	0	0.00%	562
Scott	370	76.60%	85	17.60%	28	5.80%	0	0.00%	0	0.00%	483
Searcy	191	68.21%	88	31.43%	0	0.00%	0	0.00%	1	0.36%	280
Sebastian	500	70.32%	193	27.14%	18	2.53%	0	0.00%	0	0.00%	711
Sevier	360	49.38%	347	47.60%	22	3.02%	0	0.00%	0	0.00%	729
St. Francis	175	41.97%	242	58.03%	0	0.00%	0	0.00%	0	0.00%	417
Union	387	59.91%	222	34.37%	37	5.73%	0	0.00%	0	0.00%	646
Van Buren	389	86.25%	62	13.75%	0	0.00%	0	0.00%	0	0.00%	451
Washington	1,189	97.38%	27	2.21%	5	0.41%	0	0.00%	0	0.00%	1,221
White	672	92.82%	52	7.18%	0	0.00%	0	0.00%	0	0.00%	724
Yell	316	61.60%	177	34.50%	20	3.90%	0	0.00%	0	0.00%	513
Total	18,149	68.06%	7,419	27.82%	738	2.77%	248	0.93%	112	0.42%	26,666
