= Governor Fletcher =

Governor Fletcher may refer to:

- Allen M. Fletcher (1853–1922), 54th Governor of Vermont
- Benjamin Fletcher (1640–1703), Colonial Governor of New York from 1692 to 1697
- Ernie Fletcher (born 1952), 60th Governor of Kentucky
- Murchison Fletcher (1878–1954), Acting Governor of British Ceylon from 1927 to 1928, Governor of Fiji from 1929 to 1936, and Governor of Trinidad and Tobago from 1936 to 1938
- Reginald Fletcher, 1st Baron Winster (1885–1961), Governor of Cyprus from 1946 to 1949
- Ryland Fletcher (1799–1885), 24th Governor of Vermont
- Thomas Fletcher (Arkansas politician) (1817–1880), Acting Governor of Arkansas in 1862
- Thomas Clement Fletcher (1827–1899), 18th Governor of Missouri
