= Harris Flanagin =

Governor of Arkansas from 1862 to 1864, and in exile from 1864 to 1865

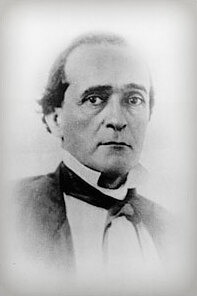

7th Governor of Arkansas
- In office November 15, 1862 – April 18, 1864; In exile April 18, 1864 – June 1, 1865 (Note: Flanagin's last official act as governor was to preside over the Arkansas Military Board during its final meeting at Washington, Arkansas, on June 1, 1865; six days after the Trans-Mississippi Department was surrendered to U.S. authorities at New Orleans.)
- Preceded by: Thomas Fletcher (acting)
- Succeeded by: Isaac Murphy

Member of the Arkansas Senate from Ouachita and Clark counties
- In office November 6, 1848 – November 4, 1850
- Preceded by: B. W. Pearce
- Succeeded by: Constituency abolished

Member of the Arkansas House of Representatives from Clark County
- In office November 7, 1842 – November 4, 1844 Serving with Joshua D. Stewart
- Preceded by: Simeon Buckner; Archibald H. Rutherford
- Succeeded by: Joseph Gray; William Owens

Personal details
- Born: November 3, 1817 Roadstown, New Jersey, U.S.
- Died: October 23, 1874 (aged 56) Arkadelphia, Arkansas, U.S.
- Resting place: Rose Hill Cemetery, Arkadelphia, Arkansas, U.S. 34°7′8.3″N 93°3′42.6″W
- Party: Democratic (from 1856)
- Other political affiliations: Whig (until 1856)
- Spouse: Martha Eliza Flanagin (m. 1851)
- Children: 3

Military service
- Allegiance: Confederate States
- Branch: Army
- Years of service: 1861–1862
- Rank: Colonel
- Commands: 2nd Arkansas Mounted Rifles
- Battles: American Civil War; Battle of Wilson's Creek; Battle of Pea Ridge; Battle of Richmond

Harris Flanagin (November 3, 1817 – October 23, 1874) was an American politician, slaveowner, and lawyer who served as the seventh governor of Arkansas from 1862 to 1864, and in exile until 1865. Prior to this he was a Confederate States Army officer who commanded infantry in the Western Theater of the American Civil War.

== Early life and education ==
Flanagin was born in the Roadstown section of Hopewell Township, Cumberland County, New Jersey, to James, a farmer and cabinetmaker, and Mary (née Harris) Flanagin. He was educated at a Quaker school in New Jersey and then went on to teach at Clermont Seminary in Frankford (present-day Philadelphia). Soon after he moved to Illinois, where he again tried teaching and while at this work studied law.

In 1838 Flanagin moved to Arkansas, settling first at Pine Bluff, then Little Rock, then Clark County in 1839, and Arkadelphia in 1842. In his new home state he made money through land speculation and by 1853 he was wealthy, owning thousands of acres of land and 6 slaves. He served in the Arkansas House of Representatives from 1842 to 1844 and the Arkansas Senate from 1848 to 1850. As a Whig, Flanigan stepped down from state politics in 1850 when support for his party began to collapse.

He was married on July 3, 1851, to Miss Martha Eliza Nash of Lafayette County.

During the secession crisis in 1861, Flanagin was elected as a delegate to the state secession convention. During the American Civil War Flanagin joined the 2nd Arkansas Mounted Rifles, fighting at Wilson's Creek and Pea Ridge. After his unit's commander was killed at Pea Ridge in March 1862, Flanigan was elected as colonel of the regiment.

== Governor of Arkansas ==
Arkansas politics had been dominated by members of the powerful Conway-Johnson family (known as "The Family") since the territorial period. Incumbent Governor Henry Rector was a member of this family, and owed his ascent in politics to family connections. Following Arkansas's secession, Rector proved to be an incompetent and unpopular administrator, and he failed to manage the military situation. The Family then focused their efforts on supporting Flanagin in an effort to unseat Rector.

Despite being a Northern-born "Yankee", Flanagin had the support of The Family's political machine and loyal press in the 1862 Arkansas gubernatorial election, and he won by an overwhelming margin. Bitter at being defeated, Rector then resigned from office, leaving Thomas Fletcher to serve the remaining two weeks of Rector's term. Flanigan left the army and was sworn in on November 15, 1862 as the 7th Governor of Arkansas.

His administration dealt primarily with war related measures and maintaining order and continuing government while undergoing an invasion. The government was faced with shortages of critical items, rising prices, care of fallen soldier's families, and related problems. During the American Civil War, the state government was forced to suspend the collection of taxes and financed the war with paper "war bonds".

Coordination of Confederate military efforts among the states was a problem Flanigan inherited from the previous Rector administration. In contrast to 1861 & 1862 when Governor Rector had insisted on personal control of Arkansas's troops, by the time Flanigan took office Confederate officers had arrived and were managing the war without much input from the Governor. Union forces captured a strategic point along the Mississippi River at the Battle of Arkansas Post in January 1863, and the Confederates failed to halt Union General Ulysses S. Grant's advances along the river. After the fall of Vicksburg on July 4, the Trans-Mississippi theater was cut off from the rest of the Confederacy and left to fend for itself.

When on September 10, 1863, the capital of Little Rock fell to Union forces and Arkansas's state government fled the city, Flanagin seized as many government documents as he could and reestablished the capital at Washington, Arkansas. While governor Flanagin remained in Confederate controlled southwest Arkansas, a Union administration under provisional governor Isaac Murphy was inaugurated April 18, 1864, in the Arkansas State House at Little Rock.

== Later life and death ==
After the American Civil War, Flanagin returned the state archives and resumed his law practice in Arkadelphia. He died and is buried at Rose Hill Cemetery, Arkadelphia.

== Electoral history ==
1862 Arkansas gubernatorial election
Party	Candidate	Votes	%
Independent	Harris Flanagin	18,139	69.06
Independent Democrat	Henry M. Rector (incumbent)	7,419	28.25
Independent	John S. H. Rainey	708	2.7
Total votes		26,266	100.0

== See also ==
- List of Freemasons
- List of governors of Arkansas
- List of people from New Jersey

== Notes ==
Arkansas House of Representatives
Preceded by Simeon Buckner; Archibald H. Rutherford	Member of the Arkansas House of Representatives from Clark County; 1842 – 1844; With: Joshua D. Stewart	Succeeded by Joseph Gray; William Owens
Arkansas Senate
Preceded by B. W. Pearce	Member of the Arkansas Senate from Ouachita and Clark counties 1848 – 1850	Constituency abolished
Military offices
Preceded by Colonel Ben T. Embry	Commanding officer of the 2nd Arkansas Mounted Rifles; 1862	Succeeded by Colonel James A. Williamson
Political offices
Preceded by Thomas Fletcher; Acting	Governor of Arkansas; 1862 – 1864; In exile 1864 – 1865	Succeeded by Isaac Murphy
