= Herb Coleman (center) =

American football player (1923–1985)

No. 25, 31, 22
- Positions: Center, guard

Personal information
- Born: June 18, 1923; Chester, West Virginia, U.S.
- Died: July 7, 1985 (aged 62); Southfield, Michigan, U.S.
- Listed height: 6 ft 0 in (1.83 m)
- Listed weight: 200 lb (91 kg)

Career information
- High school: Chester
- College: Notre Dame (1942–1943)
- NFL draft: 1945: 12th round, 113th overall pick

Career history
- Chicago Rockets (1946–1948); Baltimore Colts (1948)

Awards and highlights
- National champion (1943); Second-team All-American (1943)

Career AAFC statistics
- Games played: 37
- Games started: 24
- Interceptions: 1
- Stats at Pro Football Reference

Herbert Edward Coleman (June 18, 1923 – July 7, 1985) was an American professional football center who played three seasons in the All-America Football Conference (AAFC) with the Chicago Rockets and Baltimore Colts. He was drafted by the Boston Yanks in the twelfth round of the 1945 NFL draft. He played college football at the University of Notre Dame.

== Early life ==
Coleman was captain of his high school football and basketball teams at Chester High School in Chester, West Virginia.

== College career ==
Coleman played for the Notre Dame Fighting Irish. He earned United Press International second-team All-American honors in 1943.

== Professional career ==
Coleman was selected by the Boston Yanks in the 12th round with the 113th overall pick in the 1943 NFL draft.

Coleman played in 36 games, starting 24, for the Chicago Rockets of the AAFC from 1946 to 1948.

Coleman played in one game for the Baltimore Colts of the AAFC in 1948.

== Perosnal life ==
Coleman died on July 7, 1985, in Southfield, Michigan.
