= Isaac Murphy =

8th governor of Arkansas

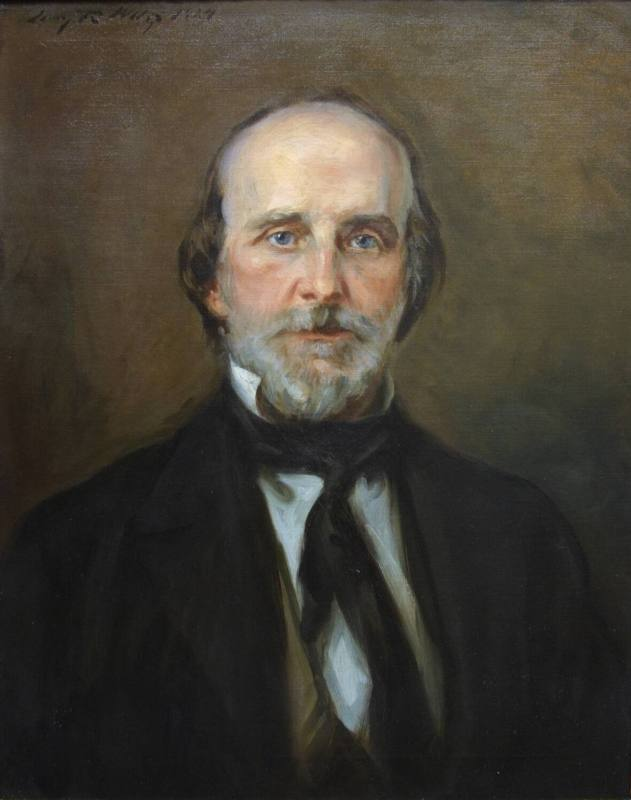

8th Governor of Arkansas
- In office April 18, 1864 – July 2, 1868
- Lieutenant: Calvin C. Bliss
- Preceded by: Harris Flanagin
- Succeeded by: Powell Clayton

Personal details
- Born: October 16, 1799 or 1802 Near Pittsburgh, Pennsylvania, U.S.
- Died: September 8, 1882 (aged 82) aged 79 or 82 Huntsville, Arkansas, U.S.
- Resting place: Huntsville Cemetery; Huntsville, Arkansas, U.S.
- Party: Unionist
- Spouse: Angelina A. Lockhart Murphy (died February 15,1860)

Isaac Murphy (October 16, 1799 or 1802 – September 8, 1882) was a native of Pennsylvania, a teacher and lawyer who moved to Fayetteville, Arkansas with his wife and child in 1834. He continued to teach and also became active in politics. Murphy is best known as the only delegate to have repeatedly voted against secession at the second Arkansas Secession Convention in 1861.

Having served in local offices and the State House, Murphy was elected as governor in a special election after the US Army occupied Arkansas in 1863 under President Abraham Lincoln. He is considered the first Reconstruction governor of Arkansas, as he was allowed to stay in office after the Reconstruction Acts were passed by Congress in 1867. Murphy was known for his fiscal restraint and a conciliatory attitude toward former Confederates.

== Early life and education ==
Murphy was born near Pittsburgh, Pennsylvania to a wealthy paper manufacturer and his wife. He was educated locally and at Washington College (now Washington & Jefferson College) in Washington, Pennsylvania. He was admitted to the bar in Allegheny County, Pennsylvania on April 29, 1825.

In 1830, Murphy moved to Clarksville, Tennessee, where he taught school. There he met and wed Angelina Lockhart on July 31, 1830. Her father so opposed the marriage when he learned that Murphy favored the abolition of slavery that he disinherited Angelina.

In 1834, the Murphys, with their newborn daughter, moved west to Fayetteville in the Arkansas Territory. In Fayetteville, Murphy established himself as a school teacher, surveyor, and lawyer. The territory was admitted as a state in 1836.

== Career ==
Murphy became active in politics, elected as the first county treasurer of Washington County in 1836, and serving for two years. He was appointed as a master in chancery in 1841. From 1837 to 1838, Murphy ran the original government land lines for Franklin County, Arkansas.

On November 30, 1844, the noted Indian Missionary Cephas Washburn, along with Murphy and other leaders, secured a charter for a college known as the Far West Seminary. Murphy taught both whites and Indians at the seminary, intended for young men. Murphy taught here until the building was destroyed by fire on February 17, 1845, putting him in debt, as he had invested in the school.

In 1846 Murphy was elected to the Arkansas House of Representatives for Washington County, and re-elected in 1848. With assignment to the Banking Committee, he attempted to introduce reforms but was stymied by the powerful political cabal known as "The Family".

Murphy ran into financial difficulties about 1849 and left for California to seek wealth in the California Gold Rush. Among the many who did not succeed, he returned to Arkansas in 1854 with nothing to show for his efforts.

Upon his return he moved to Huntsville in Madison County, Arkansas. His daughter Mrs. Mary Lowe Pierson of Washington County had been hired to teach at a new female seminary in Huntsville, the Pleasant View Female Seminary. Murphy and two more daughters were hired to assist in its operations.

In 1856, Murphy was elected to the State Senate representing Madison and Benton counties, to succeed the late senator John Berry. Murphy's eldest daughter Malilla married James R. Berry, one of the senator's sons. Northwest Arkansas was a Unionist stronghold in the years before the Civil War.

== American Civil War ==
=== Secession convention ===
When the secession crisis swept the State in February 1861, Murphy was elected by 85% on a Unionist platform to represent Madison County at the Secession Convention; his county voted to remain in the Union. When Fort Sumter, South Carolina, was fired on and President Abraham Lincoln called for troops from Arkansas, the delegates of the Secession Convention were recalled, before the planned statewide referendum on secession could be held. The convention voted to take Arkansas out of the Union, but Murphy and four other delegates opposed this step. The convention chair called on the five to switch their votes. All four of the other "nay" delegates changed their votes, but Murphy refused. Initially his position was popular in Huntsville, but as the war went on, Confederate sentiment increased.

=== Governorship ===
As war broke out, Murphy fled his home in Huntsville; he spent much of the war traveling with the Union army in northwestern Arkansas. Following the fall of the capital city of Little Rock to the Union in 1863, Arkansas' Confederate government, led by Governor Harris Flanagin, went into exile. Murphy was appointed as provisional governor on January 20, 1864, but requested that an election be held to establish his legitimacy. In the 1864 Arkansas gubernatorial election, held in March with the approval of President Lincoln, Isaac Murphy ran unopposed and was confirmed by the voters as governor of Arkansas.

== Reconstruction era ==
Murphy worked to try to heal the war wounds in Arkansas, even as the war continued in the southern parts of the state. He worked for balance and said publicly that "We have all done wrong." The 4th of July celebrations in Little Rock were led by pro-Union speakers who refrained from anti-Southern speeches or actions.

After Lincoln's assassination and the actions of numerous state legislatures to control freedmen and limit their rights, Republicans in Congress began advocating stricter Reconstruction for the former Confederate states. In 1866, pro-Confederate legislators won majorities in several southern states. That same year, white violence against former slaves broke out in several states.

In response, Republicans in Congress pushed through the 14th Amendment, granting full citizenship, rights and due process to freedmen, and the Reconstruction Acts of 1867. The rebel states were divided into military districts, to be controlled by US Army forces until the states passed new state constitutions protecting the civil rights of former slaves and accepting the 14th Amendment. Murphy was allowed to stay in office, but he was criticized by both sides.

When Murphy left office, his administration had a budget surplus. It had started with no funds. With no initiatives passed by the Reconstruction legislature to provide for public welfare and education, as well as investment in infrastructure, this surplus was diverted to public projects.

== Death and legacy ==
Murphy returned to Huntsville and took up farming and practicing law. He lived a quiet life with his family. On September 8, 1882, Murphy died unexpectedly at his home. He is buried in Huntsville Cemetery in Huntsville.

In 1974, historian John I. Smith published several articles about what he called the Huntsville Massacre, an execution of prisoners of war in 1862. He said that Murphy had been implicated in those deaths. A memorial to those murdered in Huntsville was erected, dedicated on September 30, 2006.

Political offices
Preceded by Harris Flanagin	Governor of Arkansas; 1864–1868	Succeeded by Powell Clayton
