= Arkansas secession =

1861 US state secession from the Union

The U.S. state of Arkansas seceded from the Union on May 6, 1861. The ninth state to join the Confederacy, it was admitted on May 18, 1861.

== Background ==
The presidential election of 1860 was an important inflection point in Arkansas politics. Given the distasteful policies of Abraham Lincoln and the Republican Party to many southerners, the election became a three-horse race: Southern Democratic candidate 14th Vice President of the United States John C. Breckinridge of Kentucky, Constitutional Union candidate Senator John Bell of Tennessee, and Democratic candidate Senator Stephen A. Douglas of Illinois, who was the favorite of the northern wing of the national Democratic party. In the 1860 gubernatorial race between two members of the politically dominant Conway-Johnson family (known as "The Family") devolved into a political "fratricidal war", a campaign based on personalities that largely agreed on the importance of southern rights and the expansion of slavery. The "outsider" candidate Henry Rector's key campaign surrogate Thomas C. Hindman sought to "out-southern" The Family on every issue, viewing secession as imperative and a positive good, in contrast to the Family's position that disunion would be a regrettable, but possible, option.

On election day, the Southern Democrats won Arkansas's electoral votes, but Lincoln took the White House. Rector was elected governor and Hindman was re-elected to Congress. Newspapers in Arkansas urged restraint and caution pending Lincoln's inaugural address. Elsewhere, South Carolina declared its secession from the Union. By February 1861, six more Southern states made similar declarations. On February 7, the seven states adopted a provisional constitution and established their temporary capital at Montgomery, Alabama. A pre-war February Peace Conference of 1861 met in Washington in a failed attempt at resolving the crisis.

As the secession movement grew, people in Arkansas became greatly concerned. In January 1861 the General Assembly called an election for the people to vote on whether Arkansas should hold a convention to consider secession. At the same time the voters were to elect delegates to the convention in case the vote should be favorable. On February 18, 1861, Arkansans voted to call a secession convention, but elected mostly Unionist delegates.

== Rector and the arsenal crisis ==
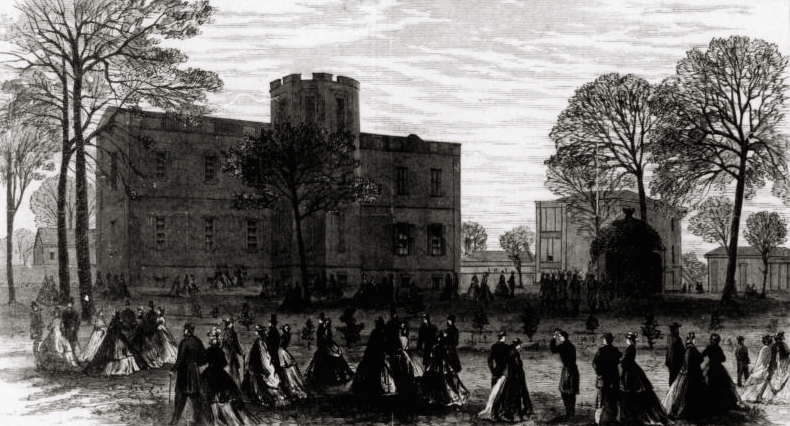
The Arsenal Grounds at Little Rock

Secessionist forces began calling for the seizure of the Federal Arsenal in Little Rock. When rumors were circulated that the Federal Government intended to reinforce the troops at the Little Rock Arsenal, the leading citizens of Helena sent Governor Henry M. Rector a telegram volunteering 500 men to assist in its seizure. Edmund Burgevin, adjutant general of Arkansas, carried the message to the Governor. Burgevin complained of the impropriety of a direct offer of volunteers to the governor of a State which had not seceded, and might not secede. Governor Rector's response was:

The governor has no authority to summon you to take possession of a Federal post, whether threatened to be reinforced or not. Should the people assemble in their defense, the governor will interpose his official position in their behalf.

In response to the Governor's message, militia companies began assembling in Little Rock by February 5, 1861, and they made their intention to seize the Arsenal known to its commander, Captain James Totten. Eventually more than a thousand militiamen would assemble, representing Phillips, Jefferson, Prairie, White, Saline, Hot Spring, Montgomery, Monroe, and St. Francis counties. Although generally opposed to secession, the Little Rock City Council feared that a battle might ensue within the city itself and passed an ordinance requesting the Governor assume control of the assembling volunteer forces and to seize the Arsenal "to prevent the effusion of blood".

Governor Rector, now armed with the city council's request, took control of the military situation. With militia forces now surrounding the arsenal grounds, Governor Rector dispatched General Thomas D. Merrick, commander of the First Division, Arkansas Militia, with a formal demand for the Arsenal's surrender. Captain Totten, Arsenal commander, agreed to evacuate the Arsenal in return for safe passage out of the state. Governor Rector agreed and the Militia took control of the Arsenal on February 8, 1861. Later, artillery batteries were set up at Helena on the Mississippi River and Pine Bluff on the Arkansas to prevent reinforcement of Federal military posts.

== Arkansas Secession Convention ==
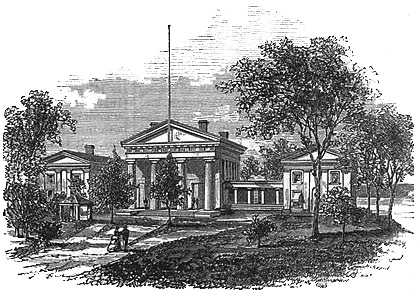
The State House, seat of the State Convention

On March 4, 1861, Lincoln was sworn in as president. In his inaugural address, he argued that the Constitution was a "more perfect union" than the earlier Articles of Confederation and Perpetual Union, that it was a binding contract, and called any secession "legally void". He stated he had no intent to invade the Southern states, nor did he intend to end slavery where it existed, but that he would use force to maintain possession of federal property belonging to the United States. His speech closed with a plea for restoration of the bonds of union.

The next day, the Arkansas Secession Convention convened at the State House in Little Rock. Judge David Walker, who opposed secession, was elected its president. The convention continued in session for two and a half weeks. Feelings ran high and many fiery speeches were made. Governor Rector addressed the convention in an oratory urging the extension of slavery:

The area of slavery must be extended correlative with its antagonism, or it will be put speedily in the "course of ultimate extinction." ... The extension of slavery is the vital point of the whole controversy between the North and the South ... Amendments to the federal constitution are urged by some as a panacea for all the ills that beset us. That instrument is amply sufficient as it now stands, for the protection of Southern rights, if it was only enforced. The South wants practical evidence of good faith from the North, not mere paper agreements and compromises. They believe slavery a sin, we do not, and there lies the trouble.

— Henry M. Rector, Arkansas Secession Convention (March 2, 1861), emphasis added.

But it soon became evident that a majority of the delegates to the convention did not think that the situation at that time called for secession. The convention voted down a resolution condemning Lincoln's inaugural address, and defeated a conditional ordinance of secession. The opinion seemed to prevail that Arkansas should secede only if the United States' government made war on the Southern states. Still hoping for a compromise settlement that would avoid war, the delegates agreed to go adjourn, subject to recall by the president of the convention, until after the people had voted on the secession question at a special election to be held in August.

== Capture of Fort Smith arsenal ==
Under orders from Confederate President Jefferson Davis, troops controlled by the Confederate government under P. G. T. Beauregard bombarded Fort Sumter in Charleston harbor on April 12, forcing the capitulation of its Federal garrison. In response, President Lincoln called upon the "militia of the several states" to provide 75,000 troops to put down the rebellion. In spite of the fact that Arkansas had yet to officially secede, Governor Rector sensed that the move toward open war would shift public opinion into the secessionist camp and he quickly organized a militia battalion under the command of Solon Borland. The militia was dispatched to seize the Federal Arsenal at Fort Smith on April 23, 1861. Governor Rector's response to President Lincoln's request for troops was: "The people of this Commonwealth are freemen, not slaves, and will defend to the last extremity their honor, lives, and property, against Northern mendacity and usurpation."

== The Ordinance of Secession ==
The first Arkansas secession convention had pledged the state to "Resist to the last extremity any attempt on the part of such power (President Lincoln) to coerce any state that had succeeded from the old Union". Now, faced with President Lincoln's demand for troops, the convention reconvened in Little Rock and, on May 6, 1861, passed the ordinance of secession by a vote of 69 to 1. Future Governor Isaac Murphy was the only "No" vote. The convention adopted several resolutions explaining why the state was declaring secession. They stated that the primary reason for Arkansas' secession was "hostility to the institution of African slavery" from the free states. The free states' support for "equality with negroes" was another reason. Three years later, one Arkansas man, supporting the view of the secession convention regarding slavery, stated that if the Union were to win the war, his "sister, wife, and mother are to be given up to the embraces of their present dusky male servitors."

Text of Ordinance:

AN ORDINANCE to dissolve the union now existing between the State of Arkansas and the other states united with her under the compact entitled "The Constitution of the United States of America".

Whereas, In addition to the well founded causes of complaint set forth by this convention, in resolutions adopted on the 11th March, A. D. 1861, against the sectional party now in power at Washington City, headed by Abraham Lincoln, he has, in the face of resolutions passed by this convention, pledging the State of Arkansas to resist to the last extremity any attempt on the part of such power to coerce any state that had seceded from the old Union, proclaimed to the world that war should be waged against such states, until they should be compelled to submit to their rule, and large forces to accomplish this, have by this same power been called out, and are now being marshalled to carry out this inhuman design, and to longer submit to such rule or remain in the old Union of the United States, would be disgraceful and ruinous to the State of Arkansas.

Therefore, we the people of the State of Arkansas, in convention assembled, do hereby declare and ordain, and it is hereby declared and ordained, that the "ordinance and acceptance of compact," passed and approved by the General Assembly of the State of Arkansas, on the 18th day of October, A. D., 1836, whereby it was by said General Assembly ordained that, by virtue of the authority vested in said General Assembly, by the provisions of the ordinance adopted by the convention of delegates assembled at Little Rock, for the purpose of forming a constitution and system of government for said state, the propositions set forth in "an act supplementary to an act entitled an act for the admission of the State of Arkansas into the Union, and to provide for the due execution of the laws of the United States within the same, and for other purposes, were freely accepted, ratified and irrevocably confirmed articles of compact and union between the State of Arkansas and the United States," and all other laws and every other law and ordinance, whereby the State of Arkansas became a member of the Federal Union, be, and the same are hereby in all respects and for every purpose herewith consistent, repealed, abrogated and fully set aside; and the union now subsisting between the State of Arkansas and the other states, under the name of the United States of America, is hereby forever dissolved.

And we do further hereby declare and ordain, that the State of Arkansas hereby resumes to herself all rights and powers heretofore delegated to the government of the United Stales of America—that her citizens are absolved from all allegiance to said government of the United States, and that she is in full possession and exercise of all the rights and sovereignty which appertain to a free and independent state.

We do further ordain and declare, that all rights acquired and vested under the constitution of the United States of America, or of any act or acts of Congress, or treaty, or under any law of this state, and not incompatible with this ordinance, shall remain in full force and effect, in no wise altered or impaired, and have the same effect as if this ordinance had not been passed.

Adopted and passed in open convention, on the sixth day of May, Anno Domini, 1861.
