= Rose Hill Cemetery (Arkadelphia, Arkansas) =

Historic cemetery in Arkansas, United States

- U.S. National Register of Historic Places
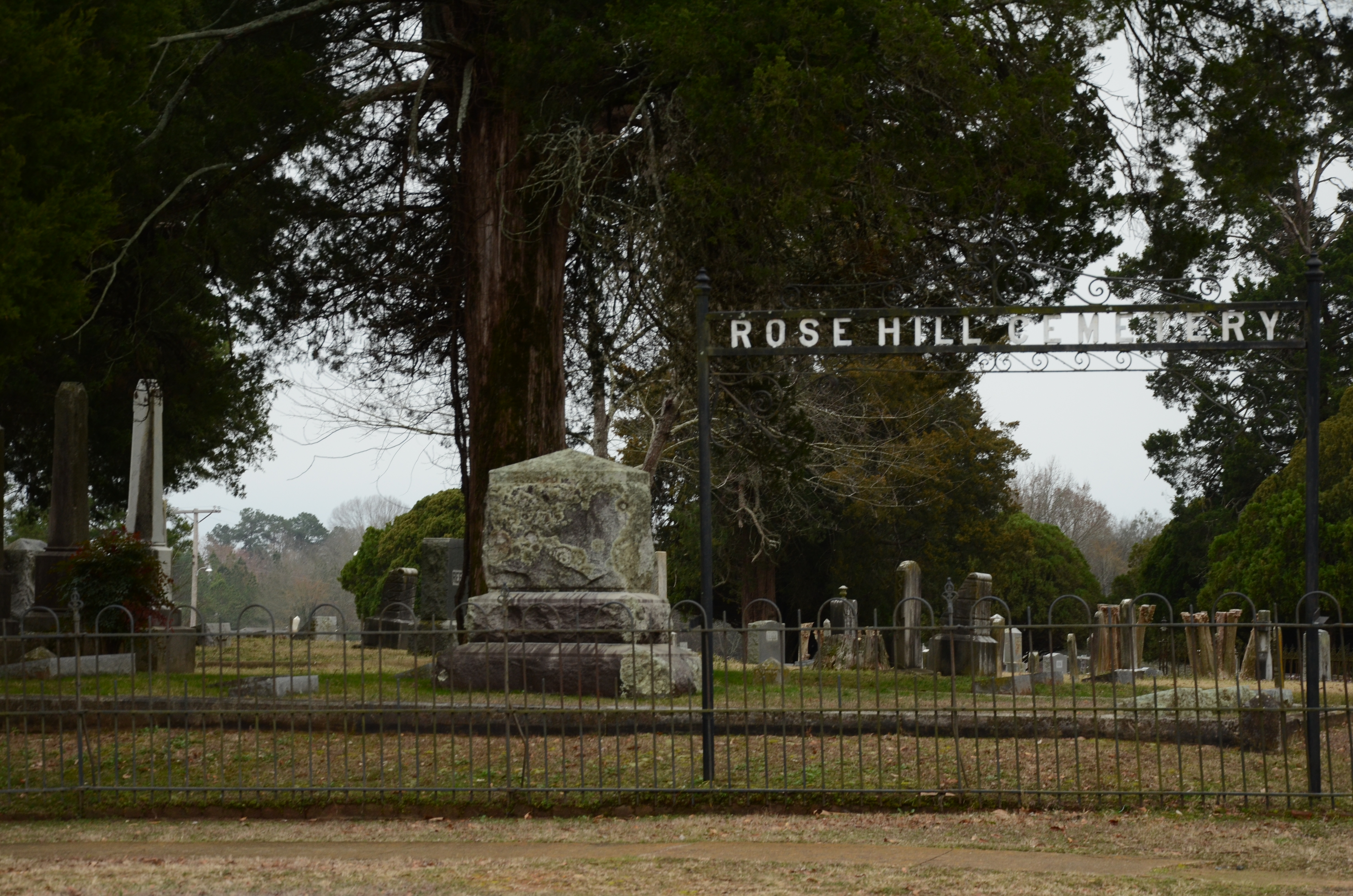

- Location within Arkansas Location within the United States
- Location: 1200 Block of Main St., Arkadelphia, Arkansas
- Coordinates: 34°7′7″N 93°3′41″W
- Area: 12 acres (4.9 ha)
- NRHP reference No.: 98000613
- Added to NRHP: February 1, 1999

Rose Hill Cemetery is the second oldest cemetery (established 1876) in Arkadelphia, Arkansas. The cemetery, whose entrance is located on the 1200 block of Main Street, is 12 acres (4.9 ha) in size, with more than 2,000 burials.

== History ==
Originally called Maddox Cemetery, it was renamed Rose Hill Cemetery in 1880. Its prominent burials include leading citizens of the county, as well as the 7th Governor of Arkansas, Harris Flanagin (1817–18974).

The cemetery was listed on the National Register of Historic Places in 1999.

== See also ==
- National Register of Historic Places listings in Clark County, Arkansas
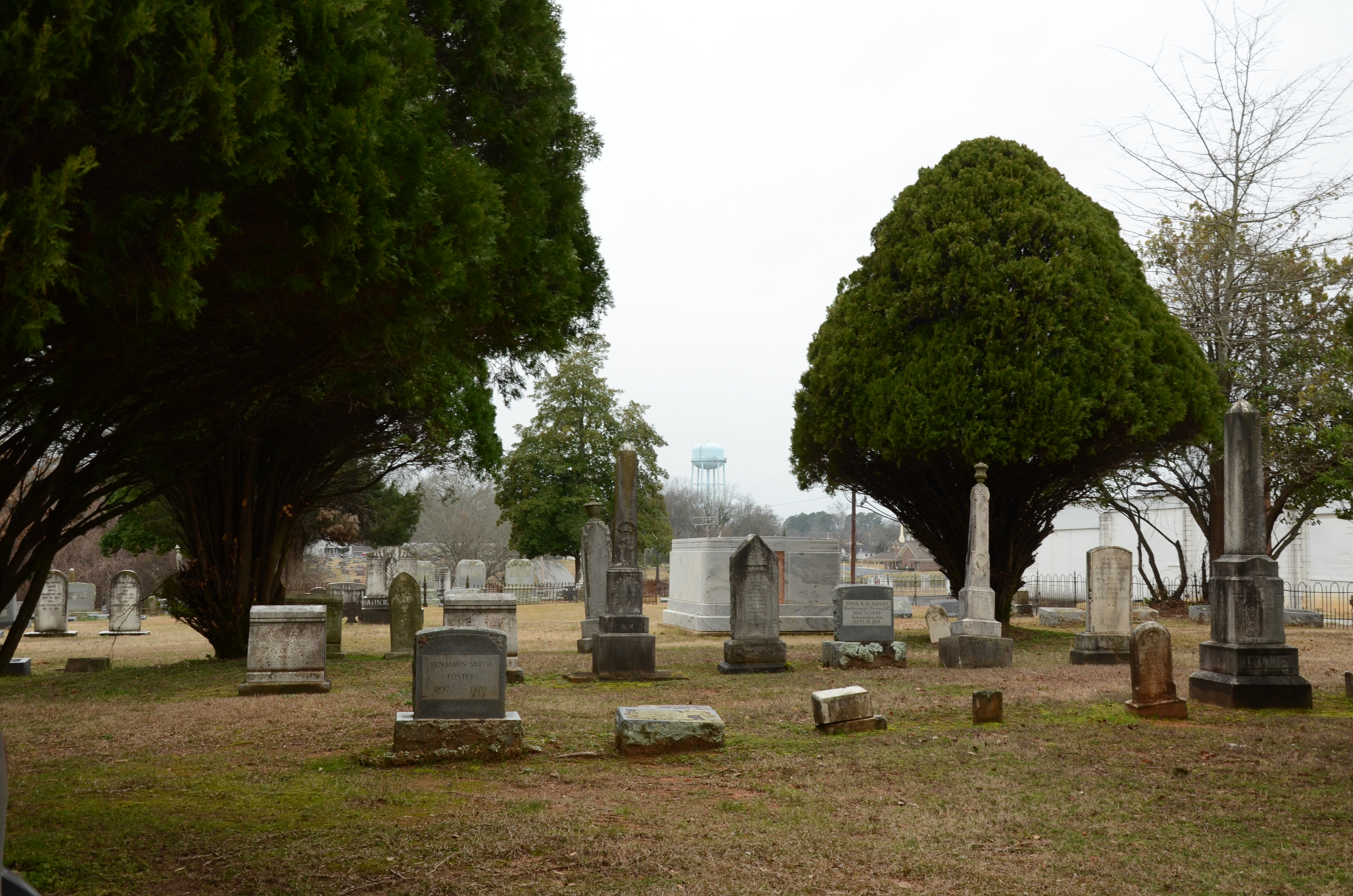
2016

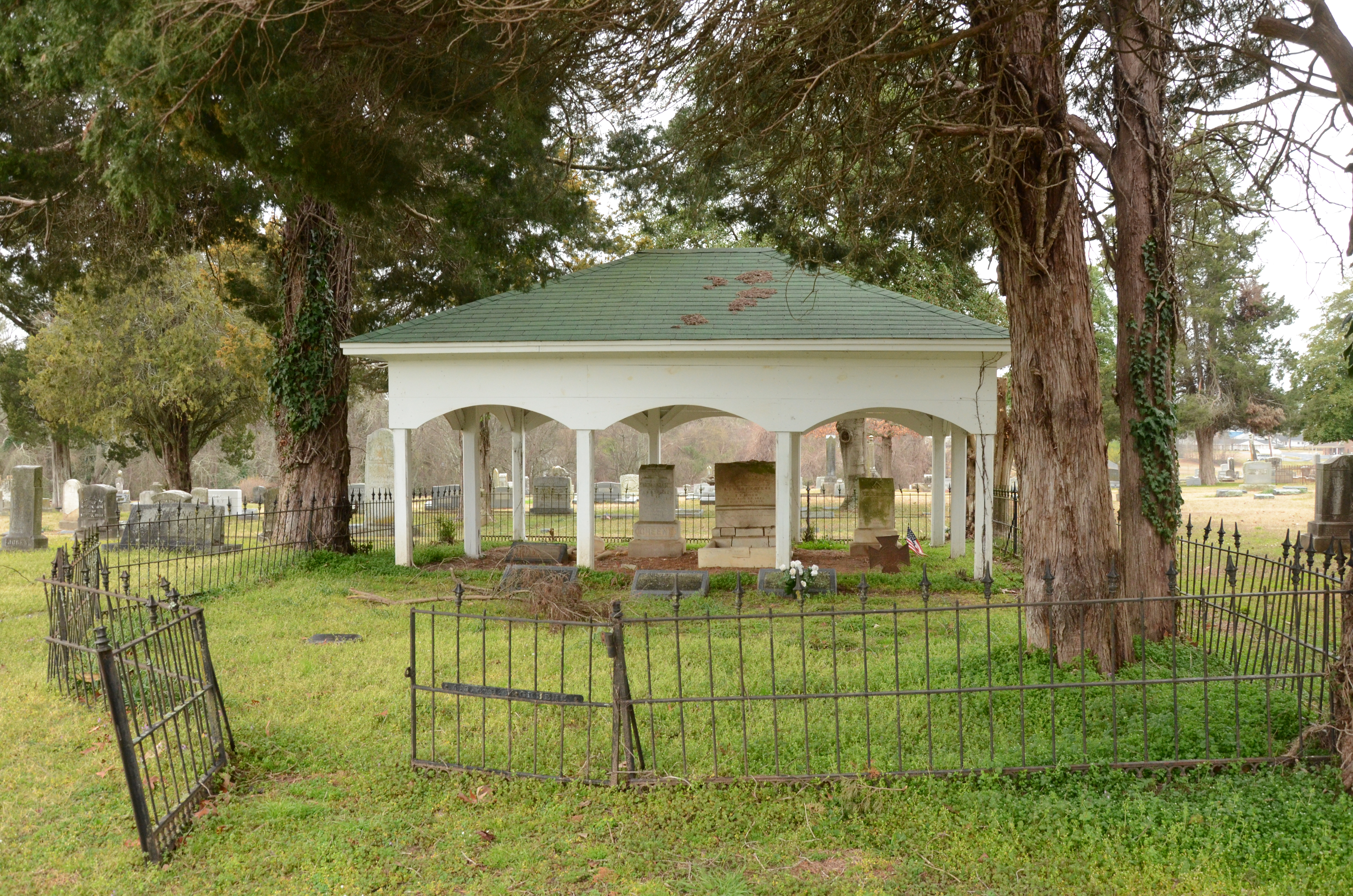
2016

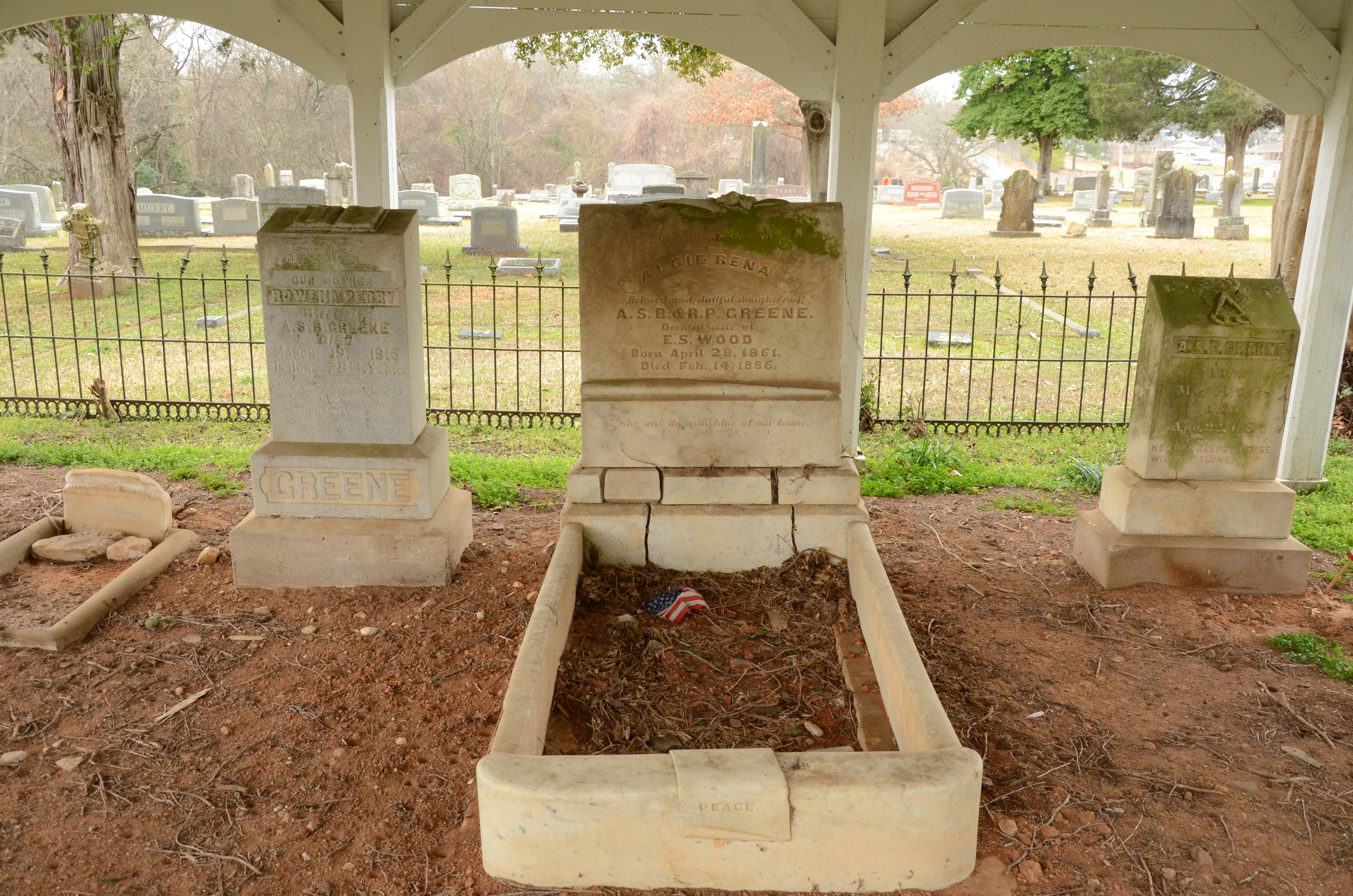
2016

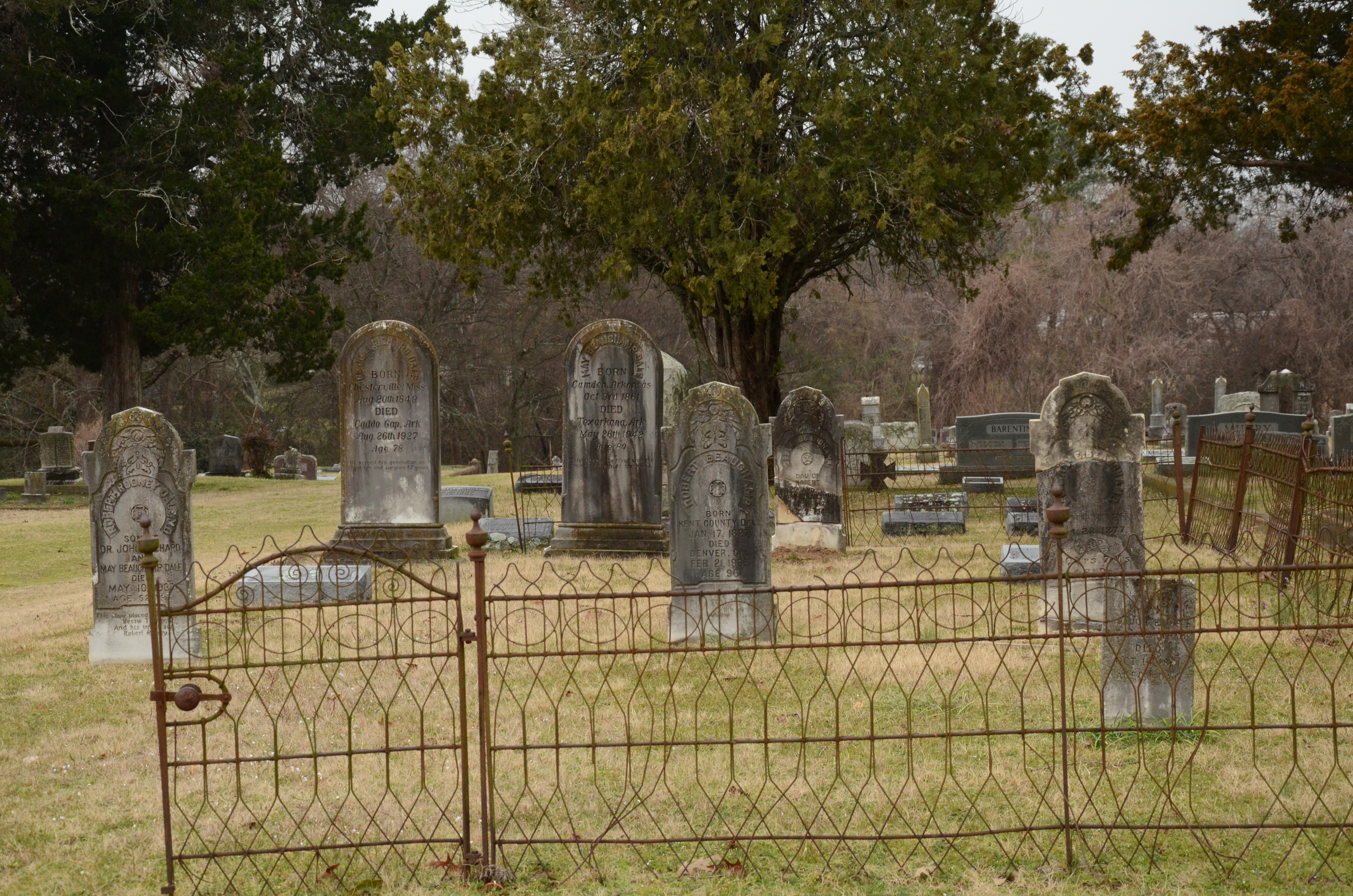
2016
