= Chester, West Virginia =

City in West Virginia, US

- City
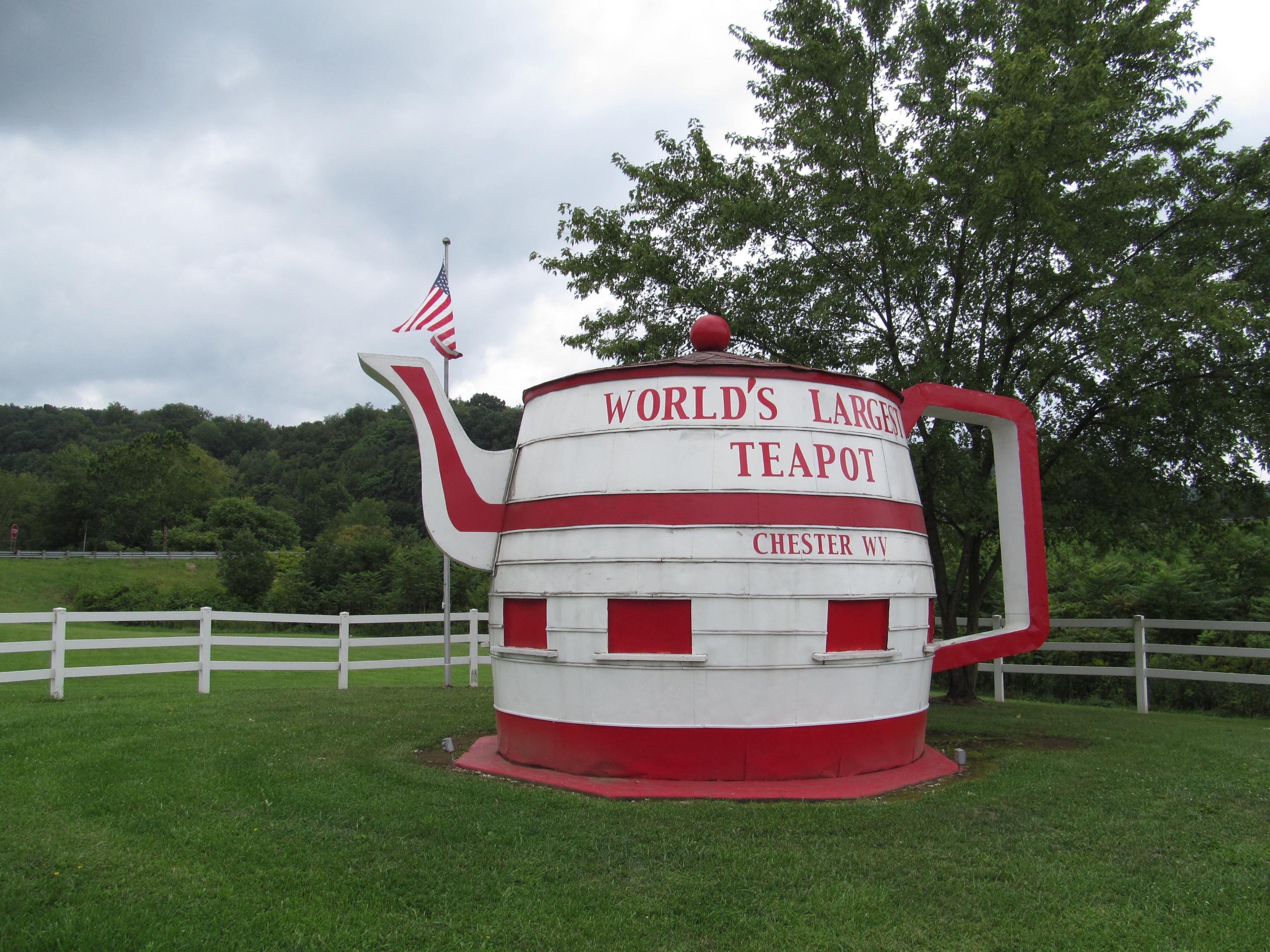
- Chester teapot
- Interactive map of Chester, West Virginia
- Location within West Virginia Location within the United States
- Coordinates: 40°36′46″N 80°33′46″W
- Country: United States
- State: West Virginia
- County: Hancock

Government
  - Mayor: Ed Wedgewood

Area
  - Total: 1.00 sq mi (2.59 km^{2})
  - Land: 1.00 sq mi (2.59 km^{2})
  - Water: 0 sq mi (0.00 km^{2})
- Elevation: 705 ft (215 m)

Population (2020)
  - Total: 2,208
  - Estimate (2021): 2,173
  - Density: 2,371.2/sq mi (915.53/km^{2})
- Time zone: UTC-5 (Eastern (EST))
  - Summer (DST): UTC-4 (EDT)
- ZIP code: 26034
- Area codes: 304, 681
- FIPS code: 54-15076
- GNIS feature ID: 1537260
- Website: https://www.chesterwv.org/

Chester is a city in Hancock County, West Virginia, United States. The population was 2,214 at the 2020 census. It is located along the Ohio River in the state's northern panhandle and is the northernmost city in West Virginia. Chester is considered part of the Weirton–Steubenville metropolitan area and is home to the Chester teapot attraction, dubbed the "world's largest teapot".

== History ==
Chester was founded in 1896 and incorporated in 1907. The town was established by lawyer J.E. McDonald from neighboring East Liverpool, Ohio. The origin of the name Chester is uncertain, although it may be a transfer from Chester County, Pennsylvania.

The town grew in the early 20th century, led primarily by the pottery industry founded in nearby East Liverpool. The Taylor, Smith & Taylor Company was the leading manufacturer in Chester, employing over 800 people at one time. Another large employer was the steel-manufacturing Chester Rolling Mill Company.

Rock Springs Park was a small amusement park founded by McDonald in 1897 and home to various rides, a swimming pool, a lake, a small zoo, and live performances. It closed in 1970 for the expansion of U.S. Route 30 through Chester.

The Chester teapot attraction was purchased by Wilford Devon in 1938 and moved to Chester from Carnegie, Pennsylvania. It served as a barrel-shaped food stand with soft serve ice cream, hot dogs, and soft drinks until it was moved and remodeled to its current location in 1990. The attraction is billed as the "world's largest teapot". The teapot has been featured in depictions of West Virginia, such as the 2018 video game Fallout 76.

== Geography ==
Chester is located at 40°36′46″N 80°33′46″W (40.612792, -80.562771). At the outbreak of hostilities of the Civil War in April 1861, this location was part of Virginia and was the northernmost point in any slave state. Chester remains the northernmost point in the Southern United States, as defined by the United States Census Bureau.

According to the United States Census Bureau, the city has a total area of 1.00 square mile (2.59 km^{2}), all land.

== Demographics ==
Historical population
Census	Pop.	Note	%±
1910	3,184		—
1920	3,283		3.1%
1930	3,701		12.7%
1940	3,805		2.8%
1950	3,758		−1.2%
1960	3,787		0.8%
1970	3,614		−4.6%
1980	3,297		−8.8%
1990	2,905		−11.9%
2000	2,592		−10.8%
2010	2,585		−0.3%
2020	2,208		−14.6%
2021 (est.)	2,173		−1.6%
U.S. Decennial Census

=== 2020 census ===
As of the 2020 census, Chester had a population of 2,208. The median age was 45.8 years. 18.7% of residents were under the age of 18 and 23.6% of residents were 65 years of age or older. For every 100 females there were 95.4 males, and for every 100 females age 18 and over there were 93.1 males age 18 and over.

100.0% of residents lived in urban areas, while 0.0% lived in rural areas.

There were 1,043 households in Chester, of which 22.9% had children under the age of 18 living in them. Of all households, 36.2% were married-couple households, 23.5% were households with a male householder and no spouse or partner present, and 34.1% were households with a female householder and no spouse or partner present. About 38.5% of all households were made up of individuals and 20.2% had someone living alone who was 65 years of age or older.

There were 1,259 housing units, of which 17.2% were vacant. The homeowner vacancy rate was 2.7% and the rental vacancy rate was 16.8%.

Racial composition as of the 2020 census
Race	Number	Percent
White	2,102	95.2%
Black or African American	12	0.5%
American Indian and Alaska Native	1	0.0%
Asian	13	0.6%
Native Hawaiian and Other Pacific Islander	1	0.0%
Some other race	5	0.2%
Two or more races	74	3.4%
Hispanic or Latino (of any race)	27	1.2%

=== 2010 census ===
As of the census of 2010, there were 2,585 people, 1,209 households, and 696 families living in the city. The population density was 2,585.0 inhabitants per square mile (998.1/km^{2}). There were 1,381 housing units at an average density of 1,381.0 per square mile (533.2/km^{2}). The racial makeup of the city was 98.0% White, 0.4% African American, 0.3% Asian, 0.6% from other races, and 0.6% from two or more races. Hispanic or Latino of any race were 1.4% of the population.

There were 1,209 households, of which 26.5% had children under the age of 18 living with them, 40.4% were married couples living together, 12.1% had a female householder with no husband present, 5.0% had a male householder with no wife present, and 42.4% were non-families. 38.3% of all households were made up of individuals, and 19.1% had someone living alone who was 65 years of age or older. The average household size was 2.14 and the average family size was 2.81.

The median age in the city was 43.2 years. 21.9% of residents were under the age of 18; 6.2% were between the ages of 18 and 24; 23.9% were from 25 to 44; 27.7% were from 45 to 64; and 20.2% were 65 years of age or older. The gender makeup of the city was 46.7% male and 53.3% female.

=== 2000 census ===
As of the census of 2000, there were 2,592 people, 1,160 households, and 725 families living in the city. The population density was 2,705.1 people per square mile (1,042.5/km^{2}). There were 1,289 housing units at an average density of 1,345.2 per square mile (518.4/km^{2}). The racial makeup of the city was 98.77% White, 0.15% African American, 0.23% Asian, 0.31% from other races, and 0.54% from two or more races. Hispanic or Latino of any race were 1.12% of the population.

There were 1,160 households, out of which 25.8% had children under the age of 18 living with them, 46.4% were married couples living together, 11.5% had a female householder with no husband present, and 37.5% were non-families. 33.8% of all households were made up of individuals, and 16.8% had someone living alone who was 65 years of age or older. The average household size was 2.23 and the average family size was 2.85.

In the city, the population was spread out, with 22.0% under the age of 18, 8.0% from 18 to 24, 27.2% from 25 to 44, 23.1% from 45 to 64, and 19.8% who were 65 years of age or older. The median age was 40 years. For every 100 females, there were 88.0 males. For every 100 females age 18 and over, there were 87.0 males.

The median income for a household in the city was $28,550, and the median income for a family was $37,672. Males had a median income of $30,625 versus $18,724 for females. The per capita income for the city was $17,137. About 8.1% of families and 10.8% of the population were below the poverty line, including 11.3% of those under age 18 and 11.6% of those age 65 or over.

== Education ==
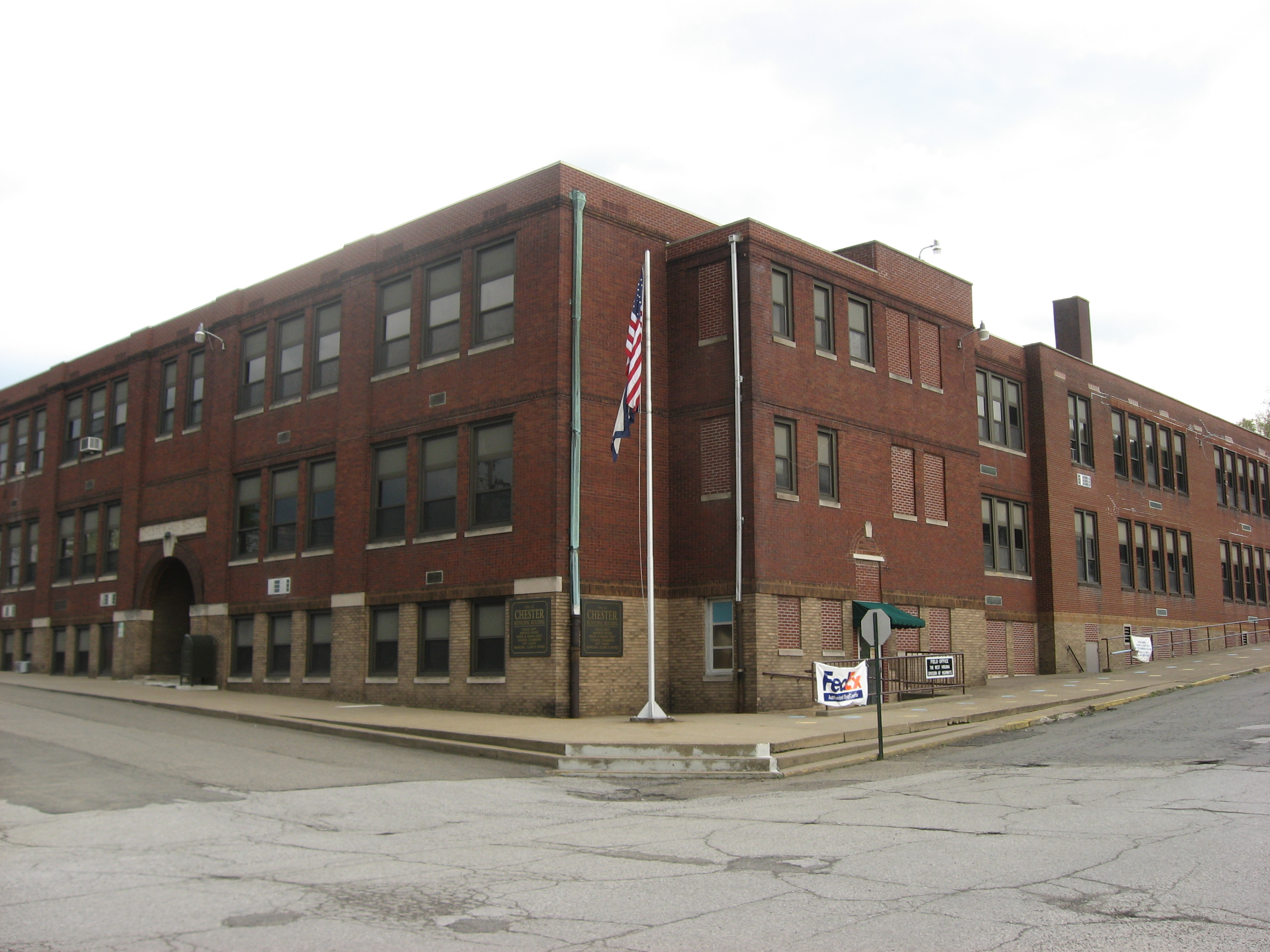
Chester Municipal Building, originally Chester High School

Children in Chester are served by the Hancock County Schools. There is one elementary school in the city, Allen T. Allison Elementary School, with students attending middle school and Oak Glen High School outside the city. The former Chester High School opened in 1926 and is currently used as the city's municipal building.

== Transportation ==
U.S. Route 30 enters Chester via the Jennings Randolph Bridge, which carries the route across the Ohio River from East Liverpool, Ohio. After about 0.4 miles (0.64 km), the highway has an interchange with West Virginia Route 2 before exiting the city towards Pennsylvania. WV 2 marks the city's main street, Carolina Avenue, and travels westward to Newell.

== Notable people ==
- Dale Baird, American thoroughbred horse racing trainer, 15 time U.S. Champion Thoroughbred Trainer by wins
- Herb Coleman, American football player
- Daniel Johnston, significant outsider and lo-fi music singer and songwriter, artist
- Jim Jordan, basketball player
- Win Mercer, Major League Baseball pitcher
- Michael Paris, WWE Wrestler
- Scott Paulsen, radio personality, former host of The DVE Morning Show and columnist
- Randy Swartzmiller, member of the West Virginia House of Delegates from the 1st district

== See also ==
- List of cities and towns along the Ohio River
- Jennings Randolph Bridge
- Rock Springs Park
