= Rock Springs Park =

Defunct amusement park once located in Chester, West Virginia

- Previously known as Rock Springs Grove
- Interactive map of Rock Springs Park
- Location: Chester, West Virginia, U.S.
- Coordinates: 40°36′46″N 80°33′46″W
- Opened: 1897
- Closed: 1970
- Owner: J. E. McDonald (1897–1899); C. A. Smith (1900–1925); C. C. & Grace Macdonald (1926–1934); Robert & Virginia Hand (1935–1970)

Rock Springs Park is a defunct amusement park once located in Chester, West Virginia, Hancock County. The park officially began operation in 1897, and closed in 1970 after the death of its final owner, Robert Hand. After four years of disuse, the land was bought by the state of West Virginia for the rerouting of U.S. Route 30 and the construction of the Jennings Randolph Bridge over the Ohio River.

== History ==
=== Pre-opening: Up to 1896 ===
The area that would become Rock Springs Park had been attracting people as early as 4,000 years ago. The Archaic Indians once thought of the spot as a sacred hunting ground. Interest in the area came about again during the years of Colonial America, when George Washington visited the vicinity on two separate occasions. In July 1758, his journal states that he was on Babb's Island, just across from the site on the Ohio River. Later, in October 1770, he reportedly camped near the park entrance and drank from the mineral waters of Rock Springs.

The park itself marks its earliest beginnings in 1857, when Rock Springs Grove (as it was known at the time) was donated by the Marks Farm for church picnics. Wharfmaster Patsy Kernan then leased the property and arranged for his ferryboat, the Ollie Neville, to carry picnickers from East Liverpool, Ohio across the Ohio River to the grove. Then, the park merely consisted of hiking trails, picnic pavilions, and a small dancing platform. As time went on, a lunchroom, baseball diamond, roller rink, and merry-go-round were added. Kernan ended his management in 1893 and was followed by L. J. McGhie, who changed little with the park.

In 1890, East Liverpool attorney James "J. E." McDonald bought 170 acres (0.69 km^{2}) of the A. E. Marks Estate for $170,000 with plans of expanding the hilly pottery town of East Liverpool to the flat headlands of the "Southside." Eleven of those acres were Rock Springs Grove. In 1893, McDonald announced plans to erect a new bridge over the Ohio River, open up a streetcar line, and turn Rock Springs into a full-blown amusement park. However, it took three years to obtain enough investors for the $250,000 project because of the financial panic of 1893. By the time construction was underway in 1896, there were less than a dozen homes along the unpaved Carolina Avenue in the community that would become Chester, West Virginia. Rock Springs Park officially opened in 1897.

=== Under J. E. McDonald: 1897-1899 ===
Rock Springs Park officially opened on May 26, 1897, when the first trolley of the East Liverpool Street Railway Company crossed the new Chester Bridge and traveled to the park. New structures included a main pavilion, a midway, a new merry-go-round, and bathhouses.

=== Under C. A. Smith: 1900-1925 ===
Charles "C. A." Smith's Steubenville, East Liverpool, and Beaver Valley Traction Company purchased Rock Springs Park in 1900. Under him, the park grew to include another new merry-go-round, the Casino dance hall, an outdoor amphitheatre, the Old Mill, the World's Greatest Scenic Railway (an early roller coaster), grandstands for the baseball field, boating and bathhouse facilities, a swimming pool, and a three and a half acre lake. This great expansion brought great success.

C. A. Smith also made it possible for new ways to get to Rock Springs. The Kenilworth line was extended into Chester and train and boat excursions made it possible for people from Wheeling, West Virginia and Pittsburgh, Pennsylvania to attend the park.

However, it wasn't all prosperity. In the years of 1914, 1915, and 1917, fires destroyed the Casino, the Old Mill, and structures near the lower gate entrance, respectively. A third dance hall opened in 1918, but this didn't help the ongoing decline in business. Smith left as park owner after the 1925 season.

=== Under C. C. and Grace Macdonald: 1926-1934 ===
Success at Rock Springs Park returned under the ownership of Charles Clinton "C. C." and Grace Macdonald. Among their notable additions were a Dentzel carousel (1927) and the Cyclone roller coaster (1928). They also erected a log cabin in 1927 that served as their home.

C. C. Macdonald, along with Richard B. Mellon, bought Idlewild Park in Ligonier, Pennsylvania. Macdonald moved him and is family there, but spent the next four years traveling between Idlewild and Rock Springs. Finally, in 1934, the Macdonalds turned over ownership of Rock Springs to their daughter and son-in-law.

=== Under Robert and Virginia Hand: 1935-1970 ===
During the ownership of Robert and Virginia Hand (son-in-law and daughter of the MacDonalds, respectively), there were no major additions to the park except for the coming and going of various flat rides. The biggest additions were the band shell and the circle swing ride. The Hands raised their two sons in the park, living in the log cabin home built by Virginia's parents.

By 1970, the Hands' boys were grown up, on their own, and parents themselves. Having spent their entire married life operating Rock Springs, Robert and Virginia were looking forward to spending retirement in Florida. Sadly, Robert Hand died after the 1970 season in October, and Rock Springs Park never reopened.

=== Disuse, demolition, and U.S. Route 30: 1971-1974 ===
After Robert Hand's death, many of the portable flat rides were sold and removed; however, the Cyclone roller coaster, Aeroplane circle swing, carousel, and kiddie rides remained along with empty buildings as a reminder of what once was.

On June 26, 1974, the Last Dance at Virginia Gardens (the park's dance hall) was held as the final event at Rock Springs Park before the rerouting of U.S. Route 30 began (the project would take the highway straight through the old park). More than 1,000 people attended the Last Dance, bringing life to the park one last time.

By the end of July 1974, the 21 structures still remaining were auctioned off. Once the site was clear and the lake drained, earthmovers came in and cut the mountain into two, effectively wiping out almost any recognizable trait of what once Rock Springs Park. Soon, the project was complete and the new Jennings Randolph Bridge crossed the Ohio River, replacing the old Chester Bridge that once brought in park patrons.

=== Reminders of Rock Springs: 1975-present ===
While most traces of Rock Springs Park are gone, a few still remain around Chester. The log cabin built by the Macdonalds and lived in by them and the Hands still stands, having been moved from its original location but still visible from U.S. 30. Owner C. A. Smith's home still stands nearby as well. The Virginia Gardens Memorial Park can also be found not too far from the Chester exit of U.S. 30. A historical marker stands along Carolina avenue near 30, but incorrectly reads "Rock Spring Park." The old Rock Springs themselves still exist too, but the waters are carried by pipe into a drainage ditch.

In June 2010, the first comprehensive work on the park, Images of America: Rock Springs Park by Joseph A. Comm, was published by Arcadia Publishing.
