= Thomas Fletcher (Arkansas politician) =

American politician

Member of the Arkansas Senate from the 16th district
- In office November 10, 1874 – January 8, 1877
- Preceded by: New constituency
- Succeeded by: M. M. Duffie

11th President of the Arkansas Senate
- In office November 1, 1858 – March 14, 1864; In exile March 14, 1864 – June 1, 1865
- Preceded by: John R. Hampton
- Succeeded by: C. C. Bliss

Member of the Arkansas Senate from the 18th district
- In office November 1, 1858 – March 14, 1864; In exile March 14, 1864 – June 1, 1865
- Preceded by: A. H. Ferguson
- Succeeded by: I. C. Mills

acting Governor of Arkansas
- In office November 4, 1862 – November 15, 1862
- Preceded by: Henry M. Rector
- Succeeded by: Harris Flanagin

Personal details
- Born: April 8, 1817 Nashville, Tennessee, U.S.
- Died: February 26, 1880 (aged 62) Little Rock, Arkansas, U.S.
- Cause of death: Pneumonia
- Resting place: Mount Holly Cemetery, Little Rock, Arkansas, U.S. 34°44′15.3″N 92°16′42.5″W
- Party: Democratic
- Spouse: Harriett C. Cage (m. 1841, died)
- Parents: Thomas H. Fletcher; Sarah G. Fletcher
- Relatives: Read Fletcher (brother)
- Education: University of Nashville

Thomas Fletcher (April 8, 1817 – February 26, 1880) was an American politician and lawyer who served as acting governor of Arkansas from November 4 to 15, 1862, following the resignation of Henry M. Rector. He was president of the Arkansas Senate from 1858 to 1864, and in exile at Washington, Arkansas until 1865.

== Early life ==
Fletcher was born on April 8, 1817, at Nashville, Tennessee. He became prominent in the profession of law and, during the Polk administration, was appointed a United States marshal. An attorney in Hinds County, Mississippi in 1850, he later moved to Arkansas County, Arkansas. Turning to elective politics, he represented the 18th district in the Arkansas Senate from 1858 to 1864, and in the State government in exile at Washington, Arkansas until the end of the American Civil War.

== Acting governor of Arkansas ==
Fletcher's two weeks as acting governor of Arkansas were initiated by the November 4, 1862 resignation of Henry M. Rector, who had lost his bid for reelection in the general election held on October 6, 1862. Fletcher, as president of the Arkansas Senate became the acting governor until the winner of the election, Harris Flanagin, took office on November 15.

== Later life and death ==
After the reconstruction period ended in Arkansas, he represented the 16th district in the Arkansas Senate. In 1878 he began the practice of the law at Little Rock, Arkansas, but his career was soon afterward terminated by his death at age 62, on February 26, 1880, at Little Rock, due to complications from pneumonia.

== See also ==
- List of burials at Mount Holly Cemetery
- List of Freemasons
- List of governors of Arkansas
- List of people from Nashville, Tennessee

Arkansas Senate
Preceded by A. H. Ferguson	Member of the Arkansas Senate from the 18th district 1858–1864; In exile 1864–1865	Succeeded by I. C. Mills
Preceded by John R. Hampton	President of the Arkansas Senate; 1858–1864; In exile 1864–1865	Succeeded by C. C. Bliss
New constituency	Member of the Arkansas Senate from the 16th district 1874–1877	Succeeded by M. M. Duffie
Political offices
Preceded by Henry M. Rector	Governor of Arkansas; Acting; 1862	Succeeded by Harris Flanagin
