= Hires Root Beer =

Root beer flavored soft drink

Hires
- Type: Root Beer
- Manufacturer: Keurig Dr Pepper
- Origin: 117-119 Arch Street, Philadelphia, Pennsylvania, U.S.
- Introduced: 1876
- Color: Caramel
- Related products: A&W Root Beer, Dad's Root Beer, Mug Root Beer, Barq's
- Website: www.drpeppersnapplegroup.com/brands/hires

Hires Root Beer is an American brand of root beer that was most recently manufactured by Keurig Dr Pepper. Introduced in 1876, it was one of the longest continuously made soft drinks in the United States.

== History ==
=== 19th century ===
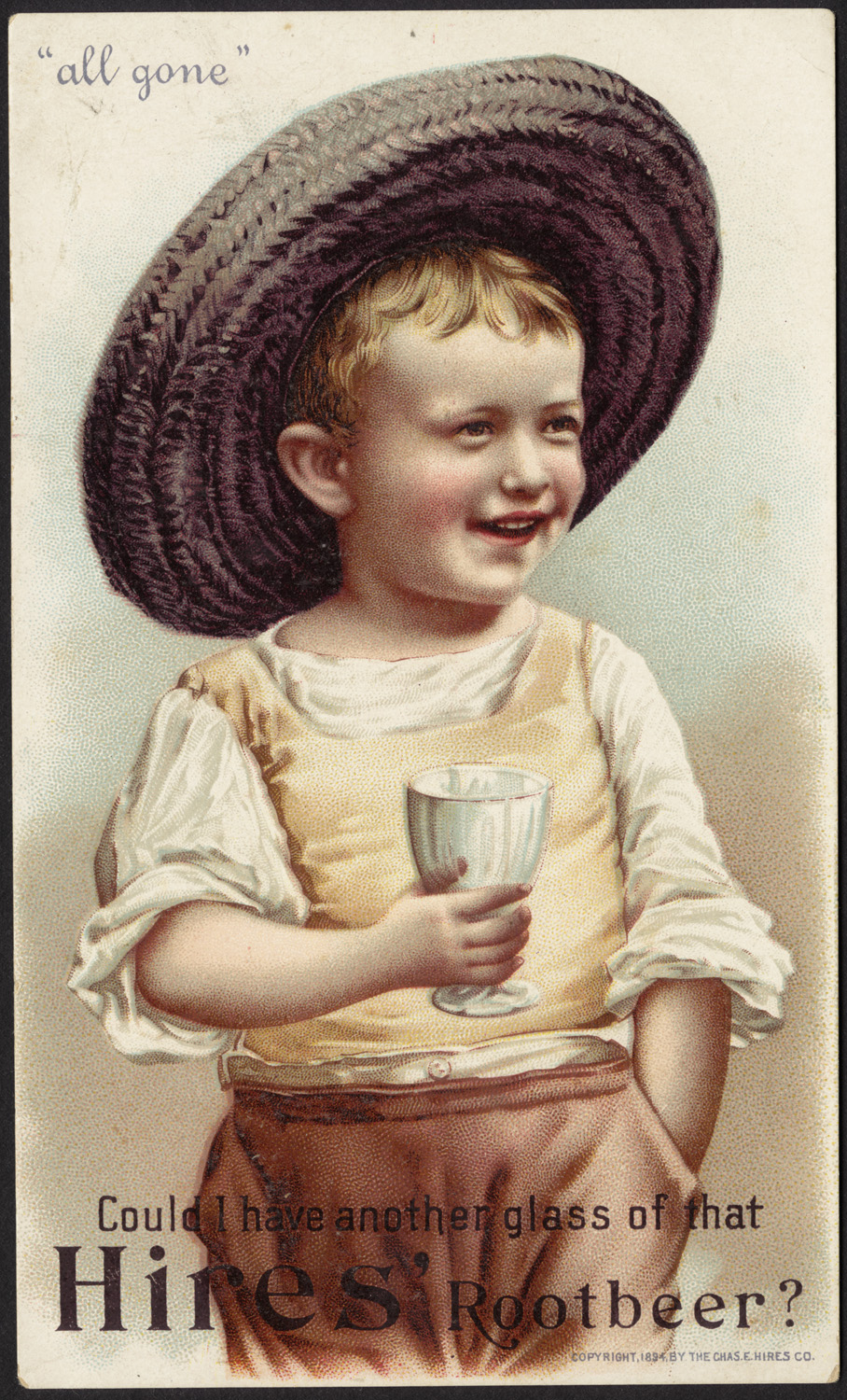
An 1894 American Trade Card for Hires Root Beer

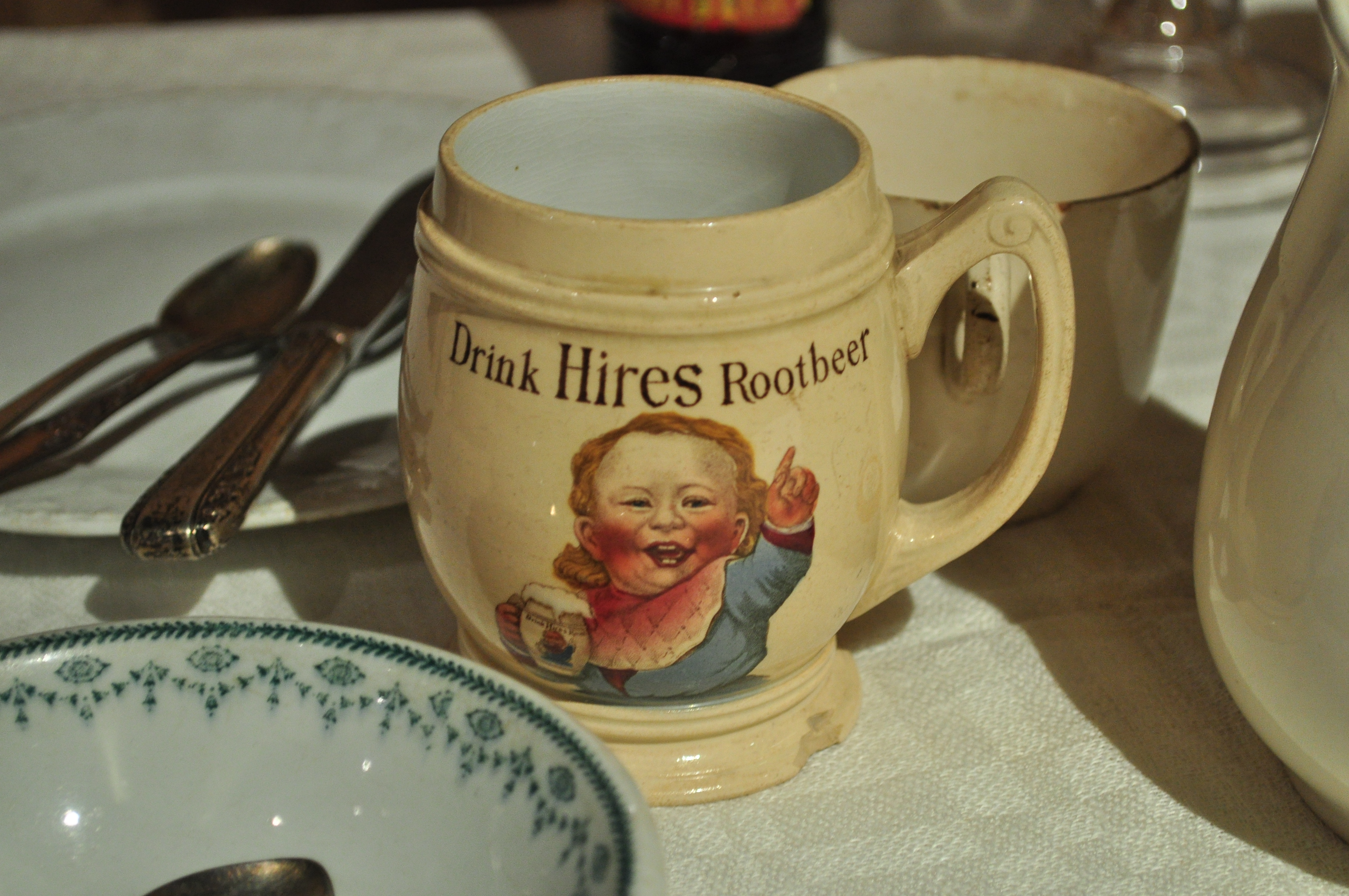
A Hires Root Beer mug from the 1930s or earlier

Hires Root Beer was created by Philadelphia, Pennsylvania, pharmacist Charles Elmer Hires. The official story is that Hires first tasted root beer, a traditional American beverage dating back to the colonial era, while on his honeymoon in 1875. However, historical accounts vary and the actual time and place of the discovery may never be known.

By 1876, Hires had developed his own recipe and was marketing 25-cent packets of powder which each yielded one US gallon (3.8 L) of root beer. At Philadelphia's Centennial Exposition in 1876, he cultivated new customers by giving away free glasses of it. Hires marketed it as a solid concentrate of 16 wild roots and berries. It claimed to purify the blood and make rosy cheeks.

In 1884, he began producing a liquid extract and a syrup for use in soda fountains, and was soon shipping root beer in kegs and producing a special fountain dispenser called the "Hires Automatic Munimaker." In 1890, the Charles E. Hires Company incorporated and began supplying Hires root beer in small bottles claiming over a million bottles sold by 1891.

Hires Root Beer was promoted as "The Temperance Drink" and "the Greatest Health-Giving Beverage in the World". Hires advertised aggressively, believing "doing business without advertising is like winking at a girl in the dark. You know what you are doing, but nobody else does."

One of the major ingredients of root beer was sassafras oil, a plant root extract used in beverages for its flavor and presumed medicinal properties. The medicinal properties of root beer are emphasized in the advertising slogan, "Join Health and Cheer; Drink Hires Rootbeer". The U.S. Food and Drug Administration banned sassafras oil in 1960 because it contains the carcinogen and liver-damaging chemical safrol. However, a process was later discovered by which the harmful chemical could be removed from sassafras oil while preserving the flavor.

Prior to the move to "natural and artificial flavors", Hires ingredients included carbonated water, sugar, dextrose, caramel, plant extracts of birch, sassafras, licorice, vanilla, spikenard, sarsaparilla, hops, wintergreen, pipsissewa, ginger and flavor.

=== 20th century ===
Hires Root Beer kits, available in the United States and Canada from the early 1900s through the 1980s allowed consumers to mix an extract with water, sugar and yeast to brew their own root beer. However, most consumption was of bottled root beer.

A mid-1960s' advertising campaign featured jingles by jazz singer Blossom Dearie, wherein she sang in a Betty-Boop voice: "Hires Root Beer! Hires Rootin' Tootin' Root Beer! Hires Rootin'-Tootin' Rabble-Rousin', lion-roarin', Roman-candle-lightin' Root Beer!"

Consolidated Foods bought the company from the Hires family in 1960, and sold it two years later to Crush International. Procter & Gamble bought Crush in 1980, and sold it to Cadbury Schweppes in 1989. Cadbury divested its soft drinks arm in 2008, and the beverage company renamed itself Dr Pepper Snapple Group.

In Canada, the Hires brand is no longer sold by Keurig Dr Pepper; retailers and vending machines have replaced it with Pepsi-owned Mug Root Beer since the 1990s and DPSG markets Stewarts Root Beer in Canada. The Hires brand is now offered by Canada Dry Motts as an alcoholic drink, Hires Root Beer and vodka.

Hires' availability in the U.S. was phased out as other Dr. Pepper owned brands like A&W Root Beer were promoted on behalf of the same company.

=== 21st century ===
As of 2023, the Keurig Dr. Pepper web page no longer lists Hires among its list of brands on the all products listing search on its website. Hires was last canned by the American Bottling Company in Ottumwa, Iowa. The last producer of Hires root beer flavored syrup for use in soda fountains, Kalil Bottling Company of Tucson, Arizona, sold their operations to Keurig Dr. Pepper on August 9, 2024.

== See also ==
- Chester teapot, a large teapot made from a former giant Hires Root Beer barrel sign
