= Jennings Randolph Bridge =

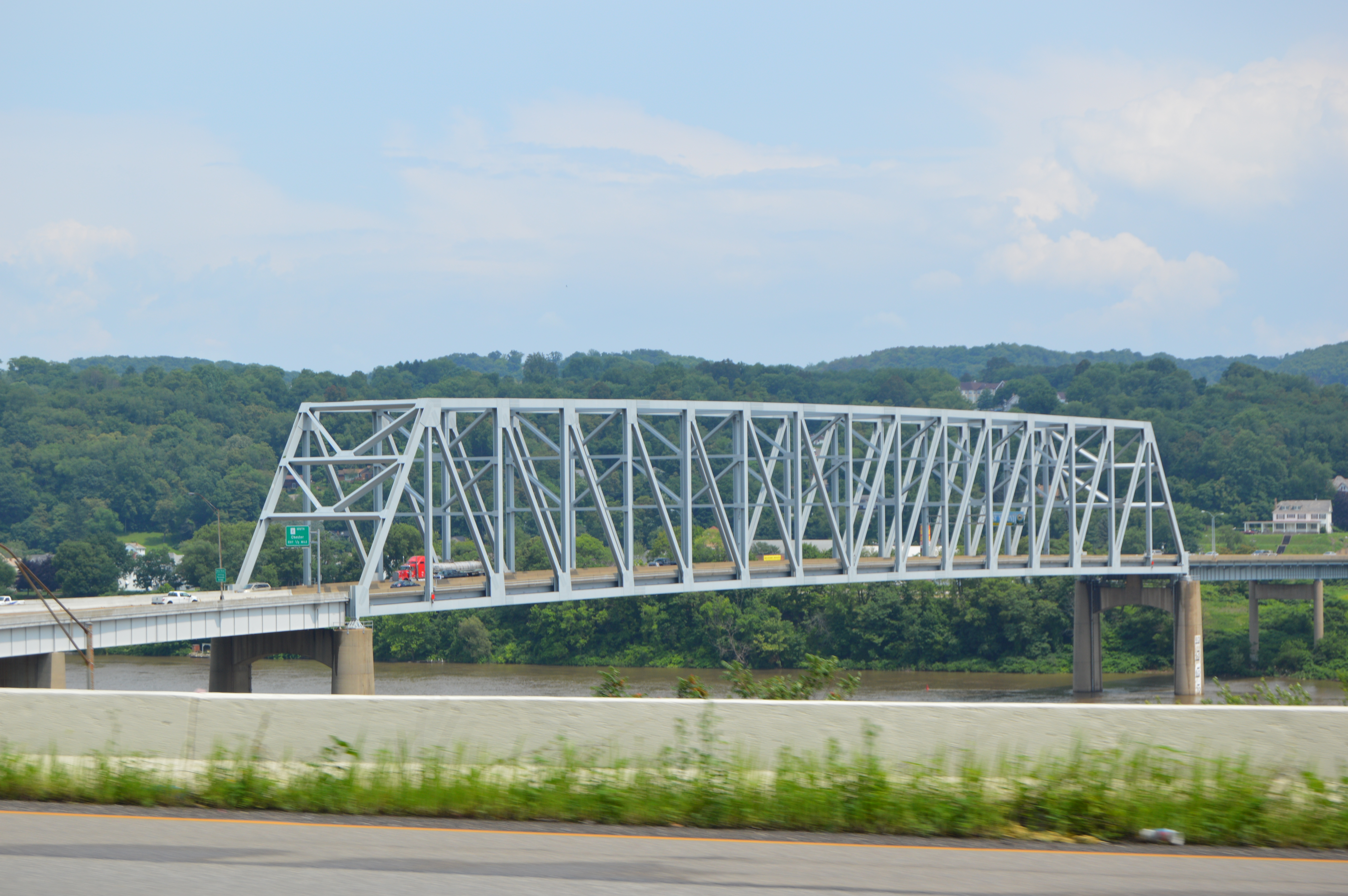
- Western side and northern portal
- Coordinates: 40°37′09″N 80°33′42″W
- Carries: 4 lanes of US 30
- Crosses: Ohio River
- Locale: East Liverpool, Ohio and Chester, West Virginia
- Named for: Jennings Randolph
- Owner: West Virginia Department of Transportation

Characteristics
- Design: Continuous Truss Bridge
- Longest span: 745 feet (227 m)

History
- Construction end: 1977
- Replaces: Chester Bridge

The Jennings Randolph Bridge, built in 1977, is the largest Pratt truss bridge in North America. It spans ~3,400 feet (1,000 m) over the Ohio River between Chester, West Virginia and East Liverpool, Ohio, with the main span of 745 feet (227 m). The bridge is located on U.S. Route 30 and is named after U.S. Senator Jennings Randolph (D-WV). The bridge replaced the 1897 Chester Bridge, and is West Virginia's northernmost crossing from its northern panhandle.

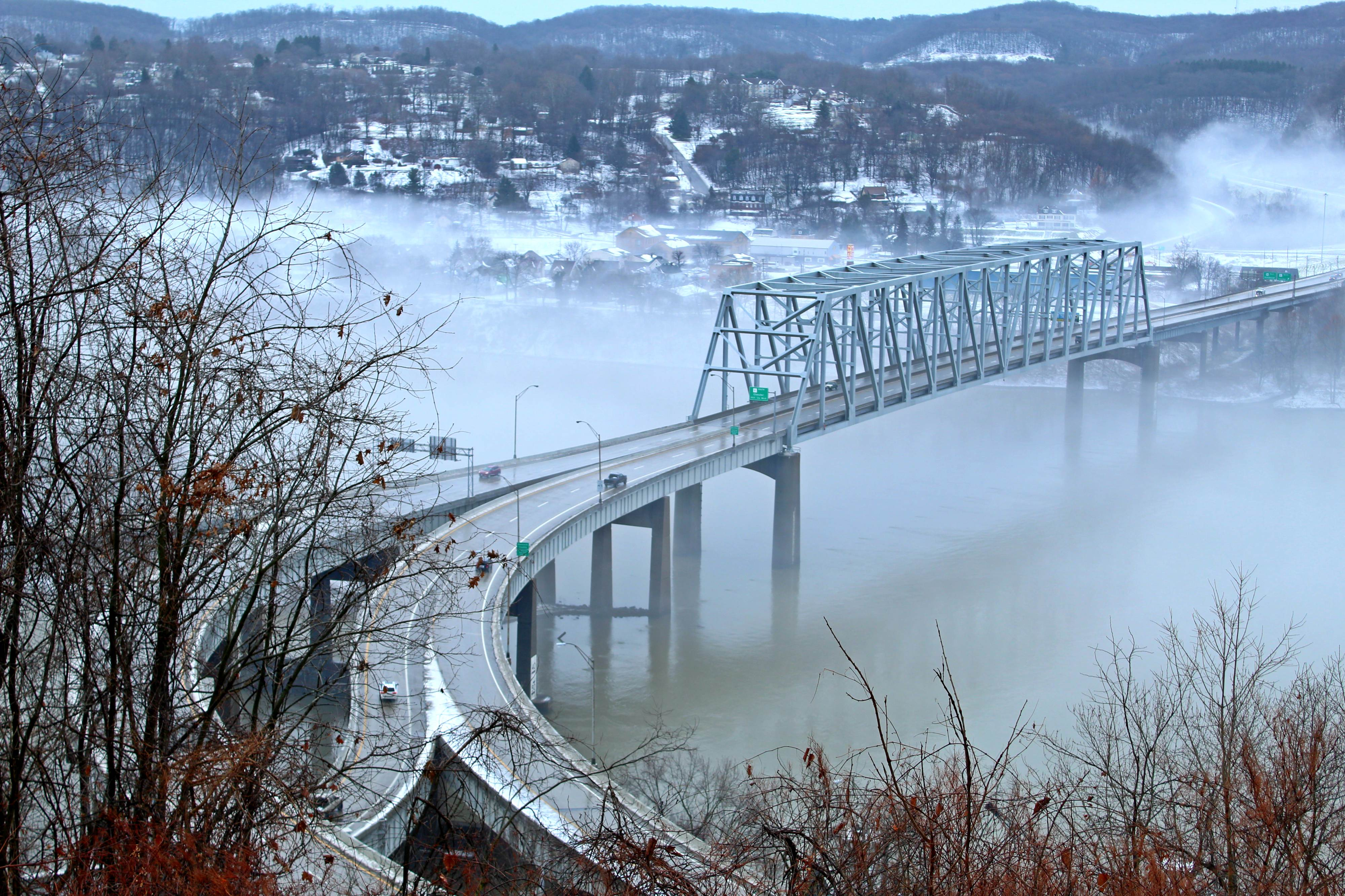
Route 30 and the Jennings Randolph Bridge as it crosses the Ohio River, January 2019.

On December 11, 2023, the West Virginia Division of Highways (WVDOH) closed the bridge after a federally mandated inspection discovered cracking in two welds on the steel bridge structure. In the end, 20 defects were found in the T-1 steel welds used to build the bridge. The bridge was reopened on January 8, 2024.
