= Henry Rector =

6th governor of Arkansas

Henry Massie Rector
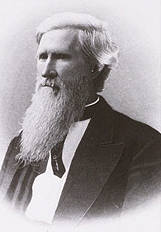

6th Governor of Arkansas
- In office November 15, 1860 – November 4, 1862
- Preceded by: Elias Conway
- Succeeded by: Thomas Fletcher (acting)

Associate Justice of the Arkansas Supreme Court
- In office February 5, 1859 – May 1860
- Preceded by: Christopher C. Scott
- Succeeded by: Hulbert F. Fairchild

Member of the Arkansas House of Representatives from Pulaski County
- In office November 6, 1854 – November 3, 1856 Serving with Joseph Stillwell
- Preceded by: William E. Ashley; Benjamin F. Danley
- Succeeded by: Lorenzo Gibson; Samuel W. Williams

Member of the Arkansas Senate from Saline and Perry counties
- In office November 4, 1848 – November 1, 1852
- Preceded by: New constituency
- Succeeded by: Constituency abolished

Personal details
- Born: May 1, 1816 Louisville, Kentucky, U.S.
- Died: August 12, 1899 (aged 83) Little Rock, Arkansas, U.S.
- Resting place: Mount Holly Cemetery, Little Rock, Arkansas, U.S. 34°44′15.3″N 92°16′42.5″W
- Party: Democratic
- Spouses: Jane Elizabeth Field (m. 1838; died 1857) Ernestine Flora Linde (m. 1859)
- Children: Elias W. Rector (son); James Rector (grandson)

Military service
- Allegiance: Confederate States
- Service: Arkansas Militia
- Years of service: 1862–1865
- Rank: Private
- Wars: American Civil War

Henry Massie Rector (May 1, 1816 – August 12, 1899) was an American politician, slaveowner, and lawyer who served as the sixth governor of Arkansas from 1860 to 1862. Rising in his political career through family connections, Rector led his state to secede from the Union during the American Civil War, but his administration proved unpopular and he lost his bid for reelection in 1862.

== Early life and education ==
Henry Massie Rector was born in Louisville, Kentucky, the son of Fannie Bardella (Thruston) and Elias Rector. His Rector family descended from the German-speaking families of Germanna in the Colony of Virginia, though both parents were also of English descent. He was educated by his mother and attended two years of school in Louisville. He moved to Arkansas in 1835, where he was later appointed U.S. Marshal. By the 1850s, he held over 1000 acres of land in Pulaski County, and owned 21 slaves. Rector studied law and was admitted to the bar in 1854.

== Political career ==
At the time Rector moved to Arkansas, local Democratic politics and state government was dominated by the Conway and Sevier families, a group he was related to known as "The Family" or "The Dynasty". Rector's cousin Ambrose H. Sevier was one of Arkansas's US senators, one cousin was Governor James Sevier Conway (in office 1836–1840), and another cousin was Governor Elias N. Conway (in office 1852–1860).

Rector's family connections served him well and advanced his political career through nepotistic appointments and support for his electoral campaigns. He was elected to the Arkansas Senate and served in that body from 1848 to 1850. From 1853 to 1857, he was appointed by his cousin Governor Elias Conway as U.S. Surveyor-General of Arkansas for several years. From 1855 to 1859, he served in the Arkansas House of Representatives and spent one term as a justice of the Arkansas Supreme Court. He proved incompetent as a judge and resigned from office after only a few months, as one contemporary writer put it: "to save himself in a manner from public disgrace."

=== Governor of Arkansas ===
The Family passed over Rector as a candidate for the 1860 Arkansas gubernatorial election, choosing instead Richard H. Johnson, a newspaper editor. Rector then gathered support from those opposed to The Family's dominance over state politics (even though he owed his political career to The Family), running as an outsider candidate. Though Johnson and Rector largely agreed on the issues, the race was mainly a matter of Family vs. anti-Family factions. Rector was portrayed as a friend to the common man, "a poor honest farmer...who toils at the plow", despite the fact that he was a wealthy slaveowner. Rector won by a narrow margin and became Governor of Arkansas on November 15, 1860, a few days after the Presidential election elevated Abraham Lincoln to office and set off the secession crisis in the South.

=== Secession crisis ===
Governor Rector immediately called for secession from the Union, and the state legislature voted in January 1861 to convene a state secession convention to vote on the matter. That same month, groups of pro-secession armed men began to assemble in Little Rock, surrounding the Federal arsenal that was guarded by a garrison of US Army soldiers. Rector did not want to make the first move that could spark war, but gave his tacit support to any militia who might attack the arsenal, proclaiming: "The governor has no authority to summon you to take possession of a Federal post, whether threatened to be reinforced or not. Should the people assemble in their defense, the governor will interpose his official position in their behalf." Absent any reinforcements or orders from Washington, the commander of the arsenal agreed to abandon the post in exchange for safe passage out of the state, and on February 8 a triumphant Rector led a march to seize the arsenal.

The Arkansas secession convention was held in March 1861, convening the day after Abraham Lincoln was inaugurated as president. Rector addressed the convention in an oratory urging the extension of slavery:

The area of slavery must be extended correlative with its antagonism, or it will be put speedily in the 'course of ultimate extinction.' ... The extension of slavery is the vital point of the whole controversy between the North and the South ... Amendments to the federal constitution are urged by some as a panacea for all the ills that beset us. That instrument is amply sufficient as it now stands, for the protection of Southern rights, if it was only enforced. The South wants practical evidence of good faith from the North, not mere paper agreements and compromises. They believe slavery a sin, we do not, and there lies the trouble.

— Henry Massey Rector, Arkansas Secession Convention (March 2, 1861).

However, the aggressive nature of the arsenal standoff had made Rector and the secessionist position unpopular, and the vote to secede failed, with the convention adjourning while still leaving Arkansas in the Union. Regardless, events elsewhere pushed Arkansas closer towards secession as other states began to leave the Union and form a Confederacy. After the capture of Fort Sumter in April 1861, President Lincoln asked Rector to supply troops for the Union cause, and Rector refused. The Governor then moved to capture another Federal arsenal at Fort Smith. The secession convention reconvened as war was breaking out, and on May 6 voted 69 to 1 in favor of leaving the Union.

=== Wartime governor and downfall ===
Rector's antics during the secession crisis made him unpopular with conservatives supported by The Family. In retribution, the secession convention delegates drafted a new state constitution that shifted power from the Governor to other offices, creating a three-man military board (including the Governor) to control the state's military forces.

One member of the state military board travelled to Richmond, Virginia, seeking to transfer Arkansas's volunteer regiments to the Confederate Army, but Rector and another military board member opposed the measure, aiming to keep the troops under Rector's control. An extreme advocate of states' rights, Rector envisioned a quasi-independent status for Arkansas, severely criticized Confederate President Jefferson Davis, and failed to coordinate his efforts with the other Confederate states. Arkansas contributed troops to aid Confederate forces at the Battle of Wilson's Creek in Missouri in August, 1861, but afterwards they returned home and many of the units disbanded. Most of the state's soldiers under Rector's command stayed at home awaiting a Union invasion while other Confederate states were forwarding their volunteers to battlefields elsewhere. Without Arkansas's support, the Confederate forces were unable to follow up on their victory at Wilson's Creek and failed to obtain control of Missouri.

Economic conditions worsened through the winter, and Rector's call to muster the state militia in January 1862 was largely ignored. Increasingly unpopular and totally failing to provide a useful contribution to the Southern war effort, a newspaper called the Governor "a miserable apology for a high public functionary". In March, Union troops moved into Northwest Arkansas and clashed with Confederate forces led by General Earl Van Dorn. The Confederates were defeated and Van Dorn retreated across the Mississippi River, leaving Arkansas undefended. Facing invasion by Union forces, the Confederate Army sent General Thomas C. Hindman to take control of the situation in Arkansas, commanding the local troops and issuing orders without consulting with Governor Rector.

Having lost support from both the population and elites, Rector was easily defeated in the 1862 Arkansas gubernatorial election by the Family-endorsed candidate Harris Flanagin. Bitter at being forced from office, Rector resigned on November 4, 1862, leaving two weeks of his remaining term to be filled by acting Governor Thomas Fletcher.

Rector left office in 1862 and served as a private in the state militia for the rest of the war. He participated in the 1874 Arkansas Constitutional Convention.

== Personal life ==
Rector's son, Elias, ran for Governor of Arkansas twice and served in the Arkansas House of Representatives for several terms, served as Speaker of the House, and married the daughter of Senator James Alcorn of Mississippi. His grandson, James, was the first Arkansan to participate in the Olympic Games.

== Death ==
Rector died in Little Rock and is buried in Mount Holly Cemetery there.

== Memorials ==
Rector Street in Little Rock is named after him. The north-bound frontage road along Interstate 30 bears his name. The northeast Arkansas town of Rector is also named after him.

== See also ==
- List of governors of Arkansas
- The Family (Arkansas politics)

Arkansas Senate
New constituency	Member of the Arkansas Senate from Saline and Perry counties 1848–1852	Constituency abolished
Arkansas House of Representatives
Preceded by William E. Ashley; Benjamin F. Danley	Member of the Arkansas House of Representatives from Pulaski County; 1854–1856; With: Joseph Stillwell	Succeeded by Lorenzo Gibson; Samuel W. Williams
Legal offices
Preceded by Christopher C. Scott	Associate Justice of the Arkansas Supreme Court; 1859–1860	Succeeded by Hulbert F. Fairchild
Political offices
Preceded by Elias Conway	Governor of Arkansas; 1860–1862	Succeeded by Thomas Fletcher; Acting
