= Charles Elmer Hires =

American businessman (1851–1937)

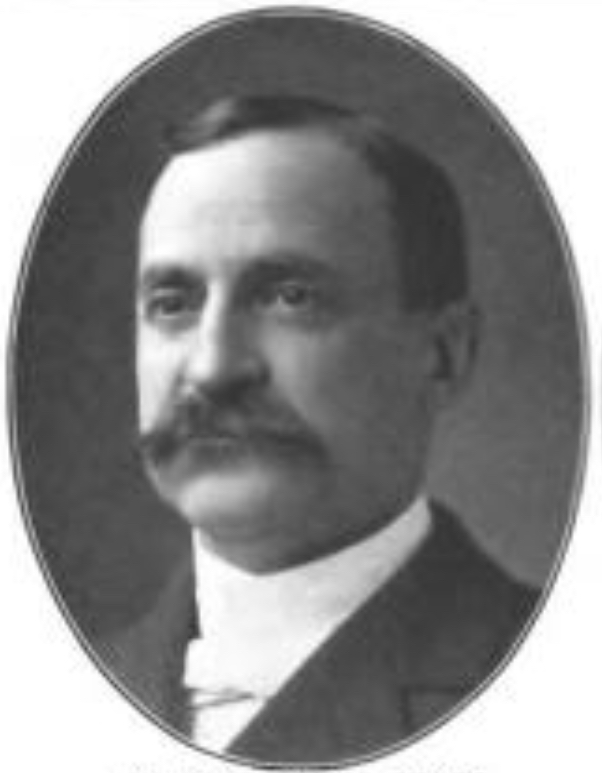
Hires in 1902

Charles Elmer Hires (August 19, 1851 – July 31, 1937) was an American pharmacist and an early promoter of commercially prepared root beer. He founded the Charles E. Hires Co., which manufactured and distributed Hires Root Beer.

== Early life ==
Hires was born on August 19, 1851, to John and Mary Hires in the Roadstown section of Hopewell Township, New Jersey. At age 12, his parents sent him to work as an apprentice at a drugstore owned by his brothers-in-law. When he was 16, he moved to Philadelphia, where he worked in a pharmacy. He saved until he had nearly $400, when he started his own drugstore.

== Career ==
Hires reportedly learned about root beer on his honeymoon in New Jersey, where the woman who ran the hotel served an herbal tea made from roots known as "root tea". His friend Russell Conwell, who went on to found Temple University, suggested that "root beer" would be more appealing to the working class. Hires packaged a dry mixture in boxes and sold it to housewives and proprietors of soda fountains. They needed to mix in water, sugar, and yeast.

The drink was slow to catch on, but Conwell persuaded Hires to present his product at the 1876 U.S. Centennial Exposition in Philadelphia. To make it stand out, he called his drink "the temperance drink" and "the greatest health-giving beverage in the world." Soon after, business flourished and Hires opened a factory at 117-119 Arch Street in Philadelphia.

Hires did not drink and marketed root beer as an alternative to alcohol. Following an analysis that suggested there was alcohol in root beer, the Woman's Christian Temperance Union launched a boycott of his product. Hires ran his own analysis and advertised heavily that the amount of alcohol was about the same as in a half loaf of bread.

== Personal life ==
Hires married Clara Kate Smith in 1875. After her death in 1910, he married Emma Waln.

== Death ==
Hires died of a stroke on July 31, 1937, at his home in Haverford, Pennsylvania, at the age of 85. Melrose, the family's estate in Merion Station, Pennsylvania, is now the site of Temple Adath Israel of the Main Line.
