= 1860 Arkansas gubernatorial election =

- August 6, 1860
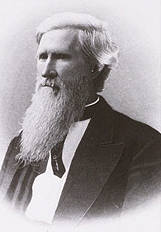

Candidate	Henry Rector	Richard H. Johnson
Party	Independent Democrat	Democratic
Popular vote	32,048	28,969
Percentage	52.32%	47.29%
- Rector: 50%-60% 60%-70% 70%-80% 80%-90% 90%-100% Johnson: 40%-50% 50%-60% 60%-70% 70%-80%
Governor before election
Elias Nelson Conway
Democratic
Elected Governor
Henry Massey Rector
Independent Democrat

The 1860 Arkansas gubernatorial election was held on August 6, 1860, in order to elect the Governor of Arkansas.

Incumbent two-term governor Elias Conway, member of the powerful Conway-Johnson family (known as "The Family") which had controlled Arkansas politics since creation of Arkansaw Territory, decided to retire from politics. His chosen successor, Richard H. Johnson, won a Democratic nomination heavily influenced by The Family. But Conway's first cousin and former Associate Justice of the Arkansas Supreme Court Henry Rector challenged Johnson as an Independent Democrat and an "outsider" to the Family. Though the candidates largely agreed on the issues, Johnson's defeat signaled the end of Family control of state politics.

== Democratic convention ==
The Democratic Party of Arkansas was controlled by the Conway-Johnson family, which had dominated antebellum politics in the state. A state convention in the Arkansas House of Representatives began on April 2, 1860. After five days of heated debate, Richard H. Johnson was nominated. Johnson was editor of the True Democrat newspaper, which had supported the Conway administration. Johnson also had the support of his elder brother, Robert W. Johnson, who Conway had appointed as United States Senator in 1855. Opponents resented the perpetuation of the Conway-Johnson dynasty. The family was a crucial part in all of Arkansas's politics as they were the leading force, and people had to "obey" them as if it were an oligarchy in Arkansas itself.

== American party convention ==
On April 30, the American Party (successors to the Know Nothing movement), as well as a remaining group of Whigs met in Helena, Arkansas. The group passed resolutions opposing secession, endorsing the nominees to be announced at the 1860 Constitutional Union Convention, and nominating Thomas Hubbard, circuit court judge from Hempstead County, as the party's candidate for governor. Given the division created at the Democratic convention, many were optimistic about Hubbard's chances.

== Rector enters the race ==
Thomas C. Hindman, United States Representative from the Arkansas 1st and an opponent of the Family, urged Rector to enter the race. In May 1860, associate justice of the Arkansas Supreme Court Henry Rector resigned his seat on the court to run for governor. Despite being a first cousin the incumbent governor Conway, Rector was viewed as an outsider to the Family.

Hindman committed his political operation to assist Rector, including newspapers and voting turnout organization, and giving speeches.

== General election ==
The election was described as "fratricidal war". Hindman's machine painted Rector, an aristocratic lawyer and planter, as the friend of the common man, usurping the position the Family had successfully adopted since Andrew Jackson and Jacksonian democracy. Campaign events and debates across the state provided a lively campaign to a voting public accustomed to the Family dictating winners. Hubbard was often left out of the debates. Johnson was a poor speaker, and there was little daylight between the candidates on the issues. Instead, the campaign was largely focused on personalities, the Family's highhanded selection of Johnson, and mudslinging. Both candidates agreed on the expansion of slavery into new territories, and both left Arkansas's secession from the United States on the table if necessary.

The election took place on August 6, 1860, but it took two weeks to tabulate the final results. Independent Democratic candidate Henry Massey Rector won the election by a margin of 3,079 votes against his opponent Democratic nominee Richard H. Johnson, thereby gaining Independent Democratic control over the office of Governor. Rector was sworn in as the 6th Governor of Arkansas on November 15, 1860. The election marked the beginning of the end of Family influence in Arkansas politics.

=== Results ===
1860 Arkansas gubernatorial election
Party	Candidate	Votes	%
Independent Democrat	Henry Rector	32,048	52.32
Democratic	Richard H. Johnson	28,969	47.29
Know Nothing	Thomas Hubbard	220	0.36
Write-in	Scattering	18	0.03
Total votes		61,017	100.00
Independent Democrat gain from Democratic			

==== Results by county ====
Results by county
County	Henry Massey Rector		Richard H. Johnson		Thomas Hubbard		Scattering		Total
County	Votes	%	Votes	%	Votes	%	Votes	%	Total
Arkansas	469	57.76%	343	42.24%	0	0.00%	0	0.00%	812
Ashley	411	41.81%	563	57.27%	9	0.92%	0	0.00%	983
Benton	914	56.04%	717	43.96%	0	0.00%	0	0.00%	1631
Bradley	750	62.45%	451	37.55%	0	0.00%	0	0.00%	1201
Calhoun	325	52.00%	298	47.68%	2	0.32%	0	0.00%	625
Carroll	711	49.34%	730	50.66%	0	0.00%	0	0.00%	1441
Chicot	126	28.44%	316	71.33%	0	0.00%	1	0.23%	443
Clark	665	43.89%	847	55.91%	3	0.20%	0	0.00%	1515
Columbia	881	51.49%	830	48.51%	0	0.00%	0	0.00%	1711
Conway	725	62.55%	434	37.45%	0	0.00%	0	0.00%	1159
Craighead	494	78.04%	139	21.96%	0	0.00%	0	0.00%	633
Crawford	531	45.85%	626	54.06%	0	0.00%	1	0.09%	1158
Crittenden	219	34.98%	407	65.02%	0	0.00%	0	0.00%	626
Dallas	508	52.70%	456	47.30%	0	0.00%	0	0.00%	964
Desha	447	62.78%	265	37.22%	0	0.00%	0	0.00%	712
Drew	865	64.75%	471	35.25%	0	0.00%	0	0.00%	1336
Franklin	726	66.67%	355	32.60%	0	0.00%	8	0.73%	1089
Fulton	337	51.85%	313	48.15%	0	0.00%	0	0.00%	650
Greene	827	86.96%	124	13.04%	0	0.00%	0	0.00%	951
Hempstead	800	46.08%	886	51.04%	50	2.88%	0	0.00%	1736
Hot Spring	348	37.26%	586	62.74%	0	0.00%	0	0.00%	934
Independence	1169	57.47%	862	42.38%	3	0.15%	0	0.00%	2034
Izard	440	37.01%	749	62.99%	0	0.00%	0	0.00%	1189
Jackson	1120	73.59%	397	26.08%	0	0.00%	5	0.33%	1522
Jefferson	918	53.59%	789	46.06%	3	0.18%	3	0.18%	1713
Johnson	574	48.44%	611	51.56%	0	0.00%	0	0.00%	1185
Lafayette	203	26.68%	505	66.36%	53	6.96%	0	0.00%	761
Lawrence	612	37.45%	1019	62.36%	3	0.18%	0	0.00%	1634
Madison	861	71.57%	342	28.43%	0	0.00%	0	0.00%	1203
Marion	525	56.94%	392	42.52%	5	0.54%	0	0.00%	922
Mississippi	235	59.64%	159	40.36%	0	0.00%	0	0.00%	394
Monroe	371	48.43%	380	49.61%	15	1.96%	0	0.00%	766
Montgomery	164	26.84%	447	73.16%	0	0.00%	0	0.00%	611
Newton	401	70.85%	165	29.15%	0	0.00%	0	0.00%	566
Ouachita	820	50.74%	796	49.26%	0	0.00%	0	0.00%	1616
Perry	94	25.20%	279	74.80%	0	0.00%	0	0.00%	373
Phillips	624	46.60%	715	53.40%	0	0.00%	0	0.00%	1339
Pike	372	57.50%	272	42.04%	3	0.46%	0	0.00%	647
Poinsett	448	94.12%	28	5.88%	0	0.00%	0	0.00%	476
Polk	229	36.64%	396	63.36%	0	0.00%	0	0.00%	625
Pope	494	41.65%	692	58.35%	0	0.00%	0	0.00%	1186
Prairie	854	60.70%	553	39.30%	0	0.00%	0	0.00%	1407
Pulaski	756	48.03%	818	51.97%	0	0.00%	0	0.00%	1574
Randolph	530	52.89%	472	47.11%	0	0.00%	0	0.00%	1002
Saline	572	48.72%	602	51.28%	0	0.00%	0	0.00%	1174
Scott	556	61.71%	345	38.29%	0	0.00%	0	0.00%	901
Searcy	492	61.35%	310	38.65%	0	0.00%	0	0.00%	802
Sebastian	1038	61.06%	662	38.94%	0	0.00%	0	0.00%	1700
Sevier	563	40.80%	806	58.41%	11	0.80%	0	0.00%	1380
St. Francis	691	56.09%	541	43.91%	0	0.00%	0	0.00%	1232
Union	482	37.48%	744	57.85%	60	4.67%	0	0.00%	1286
Van Buren	428	46.72%	488	53.28%	0	0.00%	0	0.00%	916
Washington	1305	57.39%	969	42.61%	0	0.00%	0	0.00%	2274
White	753	50.67%	733	49.33%	0	0.00%	0	0.00%	1486
Yell	275	26.22%	774	73.78%	0	0.00%	0	0.00%	1049
Total	32048	52.32%	28969	47.29%	220	0.36%	18	0.03%	61255
