= History of slavery in the United States by state =

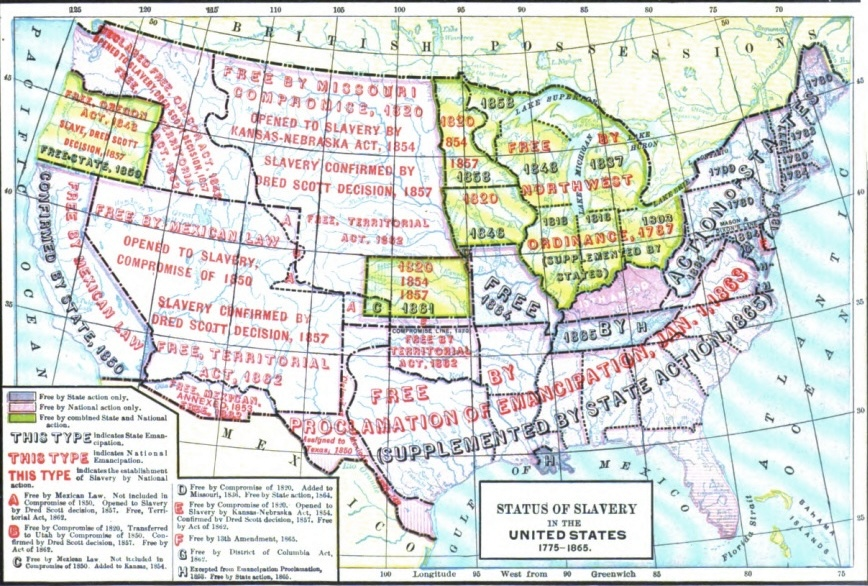
Status of slavery in the United States, 1776–1865

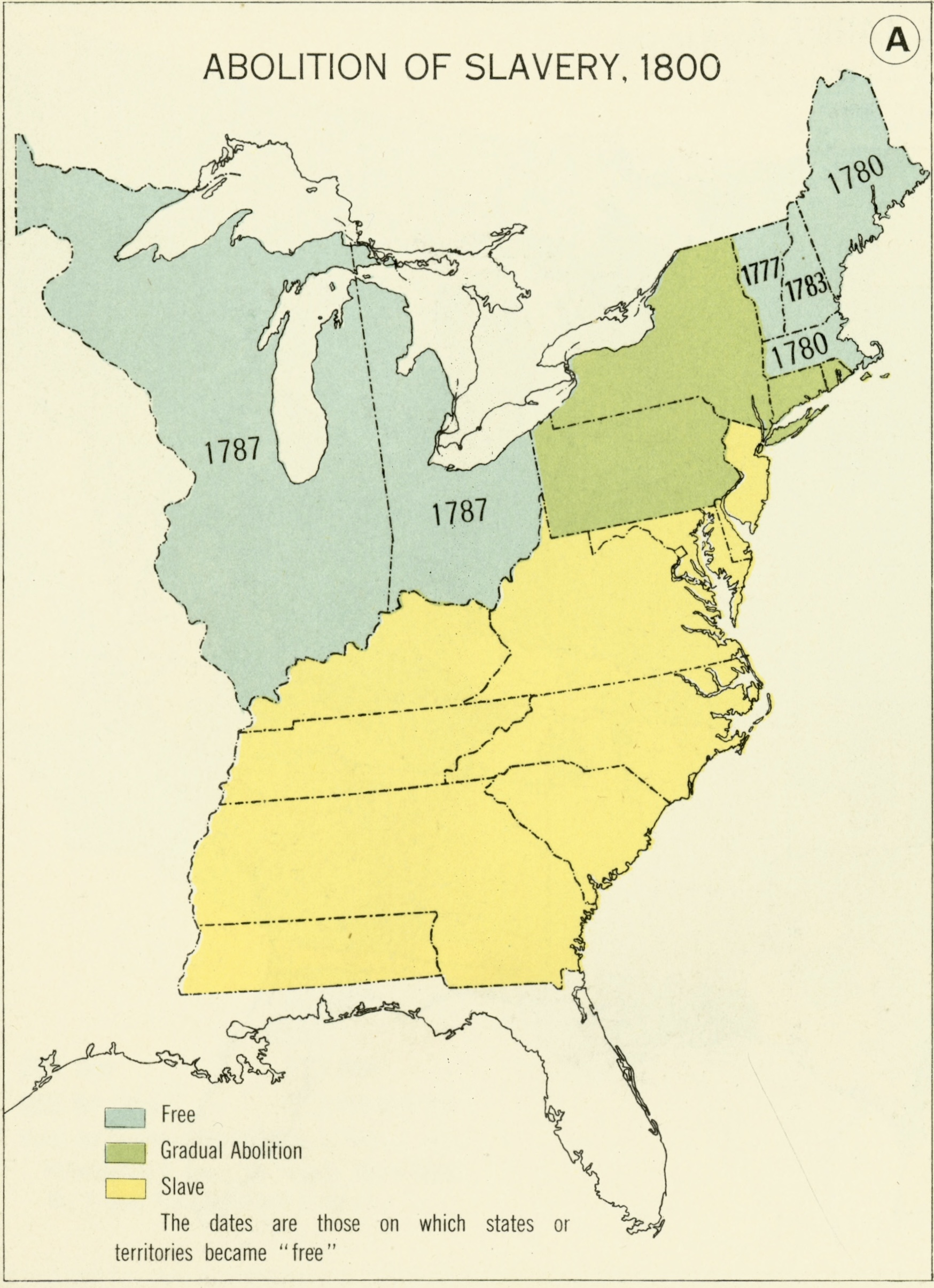
Map of abolition of slavery in the United States as of 1800

Evolution of the enslaved population of the United States as a percentage of the population of each state, 1790–1860

Following the creation of the United States in 1776 and the ratification of the U.S. Constitution in 1789, the legal status of slavery was generally a matter for individual U.S. state legislatures and judiciaries (outside of several historically significant exceptions including the Northwest Ordinance of 1787, the 1808 Act Prohibiting Importation of Slaves, the 1820 Missouri Compromise, the Fugitive Slave Act of 1850, the Dred Scott v. Sandford decision of 1857, et al.)

As such, slavery flourished in some states (mostly southern), and withered on the vine in others (mostly northern). On the whole, the former Thirteen Colonies abolished slavery relatively slowly, if at all, with several Northern states using gradual emancipation systems in which freedom would be granted after so many years of life or service. (Vermont and New York had clear and absolute freedom dates; Massachusetts and New Hampshire were de facto free states with total abolition from the American Revolution forward.)

For many years after the establishment of the republic, new states were admitted in pairs, so-called free state–slave state twins, so that some states entered the Union with guaranteed "free soil" while their twin permitted the continuation and expansion of America's peculiar institution. Fifteen states (in order of admission, Delaware, Georgia, Maryland, South Carolina, Virginia, North Carolina, Kentucky, Tennessee, Louisiana, Mississippi, Alabama, Missouri, Arkansas, Florida, and Texas) never sought to end slavery, and thus bondage and the slave trade continued in those places, and there was even a movement to reopen the transatlantic slave trade. One historian who studied "340 individuals who owned at least 250 slaves during the decade of the 1850s" found that "slightly more than two-thirds of these elite slaveholders resided in the three great plantation states of South Carolina, Mississippi, and Louisiana. There were significant but lesser numbers in states like Georgia, Alabama, and North Carolina, but only a handful in such peripheral states as Arkansas, Florida, Maryland, and Texas."

With the admission of California, Oregon, and Iowa as free states, and the prospective admission of Kansas Territory (likely as a free state), with the commensurate increasing political power of free-state legislators in the United States Congress, the political status quo began to disintegrate. This shift convinced the Slave Power's most influential and vocal leaders that secession was the only way to retain long-term control of both their wealth held in slaves and their political power. (Under the Three-Fifths Compromise brokered at the 1787 Constitutional Convention, enslaved people were considered additional population for purposes of apportionment. The prospective end of slavery would have thus deprived slave owners of the disproportionate representation of their interests in the national legislature, relative not just the people they enslaved but to free white male voters in other states.) Ultimately, a massive and devastating four-year-long war resolved the interstate conflict over slavery, and when rebel state governments were finally overwhelmed by force of arms, various civilian and military representatives of the U.S. government emancipated those people who remained legally enslaved. Slavery in the United States was legally abolished nationwide within the 36 newly reunited states under the Thirteenth Amendment to the United States Constitution, effective December 18, 1865.

Slavery in the Indian Territory was abolished in 1866 by a series of treaties made with each of the Five Civilized Tribes in series, agreements known today as the Reconstruction Treaties.

The federal district, which is legally part of no state and under the sole jurisdiction of the U.S. Congress, permitted slavery until the American Civil War. For the history of the abolition of the slave trade in the district and the federal government's one and only compensated emancipation program, see slavery in the District of Columbia.

Color key:
United States allegiance during the American Civil War
Confederate States allegiance during the American Civil War
Dual allegiance, disputed allegiance, or new state during the American Civil War

States admitted prior to 1865
State	Civil War allegiance	Date ratified 13th Amendment	Prior state-wide abolition	Notes
Alabama Main article: History of slavery in Alabama	CSA	December 2, 1865		
Arkansas Main article: History of slavery in Arkansas	CSA	April 14, 1865		
California Main articles: History of slavery in California and Forced labor in California	USA	December 20, 1865	September 9, 1850 (statehood)	
Connecticut Main article: History of slavery in Connecticut	USA	May 4, 1865	1784 (gradual); 1848 (full)	Connecticut passed partial abolition laws and time-delayed manumission laws beginning in 1784.
Delaware Main article: History of slavery in Delaware	USA	February 19, 1901		Delaware was a slave state but did not secede to the Confederacy.
Florida Main article: History of slavery in Florida	CSA	December 28, 1865		
Georgia Main article: History of slavery in Georgia	CSA	December 6, 1865		
Illinois Main article: History of slavery in Illinois	USA	February 1, 1865	April 1, 1848	Chattel slavery was prohibited in Illinois at statehood under the terms of the Northwest Ordinance; indentured servitude was not prohibited until the Second Illinois Constitution of 1848.
Indiana Main article: History of slavery in Indiana	USA	February 6, 1865	December 11, 1816 (statehood)	
Iowa Main article: History of slavery in Iowa	USA	January 17, 1866	December 28, 1846 (statehood)	
Kansas Main articles: History of slavery in Kansas and Bleeding Kansas	USA	February 7, 1865	January 29, 1861 (statehood)	
Kentucky Main article: History of slavery in Kentucky	Dual government	March 18, 1976		
Louisiana Main article: History of slavery in Louisiana	CSA	February 1865		Louisiana ratified the Thirteenth Amendment on either Feb. 15 or 16.
Maryland Main article: History of slavery in Maryland	USA	February 3, 1865	November 1, 1864	
Massachusetts Main article: History of slavery in Massachusetts	USA	February 7, 1865	1783 (supreme court)	Massachusetts was for intents and purposes a free state with total abolition from the American Revolution forward.
Maine	USA	February 7, 1865	March 15, 1820 (statehood)	The pre-statehood District of Maine was legally a part of Massachusetts; Maine was admitted as Missouri's free-state "twin" under the Missouri Compromise.
Michigan Main article: History of slavery in Michigan	USA	February 2, 1865	January 26, 1837 (statehood)	
Minnesota Main article: History of slavery in Minnesota	USA	February 23, 1865	May 11, 1858 (statehood)	
Missouri Main articles: History of slavery in Missouri and Missouri Compromise	Dual government	February 6, 1865		
Mississippi Main article: History of slavery in Mississippi	CSA	February 7, 2013		
Nevada	USA	February 16, 1865	October 31, 1864 (statehood) (Note: Abolition ordinance passed July 1864, and abolition clause included in original state constitution)	Nevada was admitted to the Union during the Civil War, thus its state nickname is Battle-Born.
New Hampshire Main article: History of New Hampshire § Slavery in New Hampshire	USA	June 30, 1865		The legal status of slavery in New Hampshire has been described as "ambiguous," and abolition legislation was minimal or non-existent. New Hampshire never passed a state law abolishing slavery. That said, New Hampshire was a free state with no slavery to speak of from the American Revolution forward.
New Jersey Main article: History of slavery in New Jersey	USA	January 23, 1866	1804 (gradual); April 18, 1846	New Jersey had some gradual manumission laws prior to 1846, resulting in a "continuum" of servitude statuses that persisted until the Civil War.
New York Main article: History of slavery in New York (state)	USA	February 3, 1865	1799 (gradual); July 4, 1827 (full)	
North Carolina Main article: History of slavery in North Carolina	CSA	December 4, 1865		
Ohio Main articles: Slavery in New France, Northwest Ordinance § Prohibition of slavery, and Black Laws of 1804 and 1807	USA	February 10, 1865	February 19, 1803 (statehood)	
Oregon Main article: History of African Americans in Oregon	USA	December 11, 1865	February 14, 1859 (statehood) (Note: Only free state admitted with an "exclusionary clause"; see Oregon black exclusion laws)	
Pennsylvania Main article: History of slavery in Pennsylvania	USA	February 8, 1865	March 1, 1780 (gradual); 1847 (full)	Pennsylvania's gradual emancipation system meant that enslavement and indentured servitude continued until 1847.
Rhode Island Main article: History of Rhode Island § Slavery in Rhode Island	USA	February 2, 1865	1784 (gradual); 1843 (full)	Rhode Island passed gradual emancipation laws after the American Revolution.
South Carolina Main article: History of slavery in South Carolina	CSA	November 13, 1865		
Tennessee Main article: History of slavery in Tennessee	CSA	April 7, 1865	October 24, 1864 (Moses speech declaration by military governor of Tennessee Andrew Johnson), and state constitutional amendment certified February 27, 1865	
Texas Main article: History of slavery in Texas	CSA	February 17, 1870	June 19, 1865 (Juneteenth declaration by U.S. Army)	
Vermont Main article: History of slavery in Vermont	USA	March 9, 1865	March 4, 1791 (statehood)	Constitution of the Vermont Republic abolished slavery effective July 2, 1777.
Virginia Main article: History of slavery in Virginia	CSA	February 9, 1865		
West Virginia Main article: History of slavery in West Virginia	Dual government	February 3, 1865		The Appalachian counties of Virginia separated from the rest of the state during the Civil War. Gradual emancipation was written in West Virginia state constitution of 1863.
Wisconsin	USA	February 24, 1865	May 29, 1848 (statehood)	

== Slavery in states admitted after 1865 ==
- History of slavery in Alaska
- History of slavery in Colorado
- History of slavery in Montana
- History of slavery in Nebraska
- History of slavery in New Mexico
- History of slavery in Oklahoma
- History of slavery in South Dakota
- History of slavery in Utah

== See also ==
- 1860 United States census § Population of U.S. states and territories
- Border states (American Civil War)
- Slavery in the United States § Geography and demography
- Emancipation Day § United States
- End of slavery in the United States
- History of unfree labor in the United States
