= Arkansas in the American Civil War =

Coordinates: 34.8°N 92.2°W

Arkansas
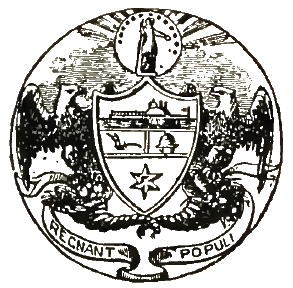
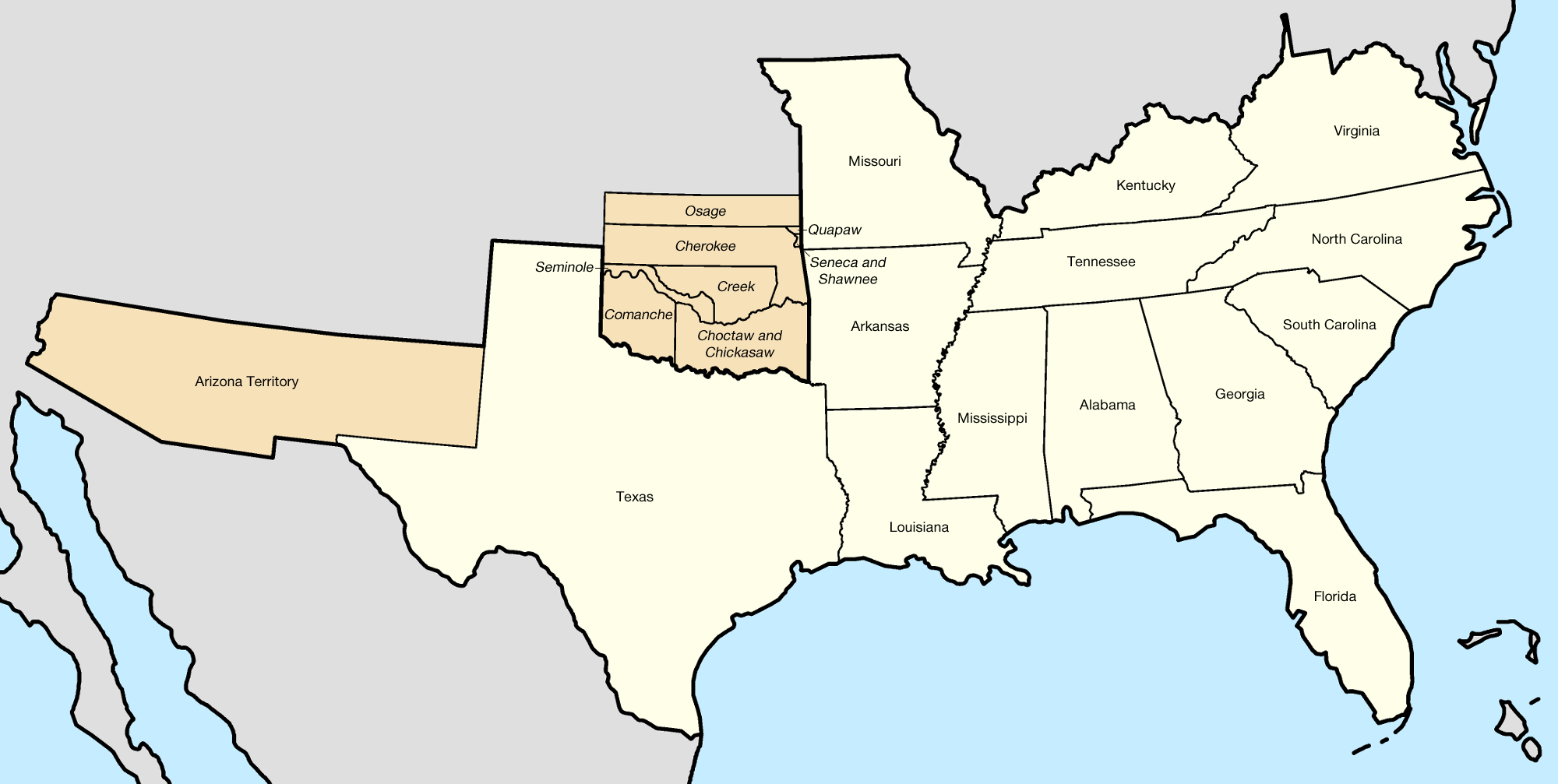
- Flag of the Confederate; States (May 18, 1861) (Note: "Neither Arkansas nor Missouri enacted legislation to adopt an official State flag" (Cannon 1994, p. 48).) Seal (1861 design) Map of the Confederate States
- Capital: 1861–1863 Little Rock; 1863–1865 Washington
- Largest city: Little Rock
- Admitted to the Confederacy: May 18, 1861 (9th)
- Population: 435,450 total; • 324,335 (74.48%) free; • 111,115 (25.52%) slave
- Forces supplied: 73,901 Confederate soldiers, 9,236 Union soldiers, and 5,526 U.S. Colored Troops total
- Major garrisons/armories: Fort Smith; Little Rock Arsenal
- Governor: 1861–1862 Henry M. Rector; 1862 Thomas Fletcher (acting); 1862–1865 Harris Flanagin (surrendered)
- Senators: 1862–1865 Robert W. Johnson; 1862–1864 Charles B. Mitchel; 1864–1865 Augustus H. Garland
- Representatives: List
- Restored to the Union: June 22, 1868

During the American Civil War, Arkansas was a Confederate state, though it had initially voted to remain in the Union. Following the capture of Fort Sumter in April 1861, Abraham Lincoln called for troops from every Union state to put down the rebellion, and Arkansas along with several other southern states seceded. For the rest of the civil war, Arkansas played a major role in controlling the Mississippi River, a major waterway.

Arkansas raised 48 infantry regiments, 20 artillery batteries, and over 20 cavalry regiments for the Confederacy, mostly serving in the Western Theater, though the Third Arkansas served with distinction in the Army of Northern Virginia. Major-General Patrick Cleburne was the state's most notable military leader. The state also supplied four infantry regiments, four cavalry regiments and one artillery battery of white troops for the Union and six infantry regiments and one artillery battery of "U.S. Colored Troops."

Numerous skirmishes as well as several significant battles were fought in Arkansas, including the Battle of Elkhorn Tavern in March 1862, a decisive one for the Trans-Mississippi Theater which ensured Union control of northern Arkansas. The state capitol at Little Rock was captured in 1863. By the end of the war, programs such as the draft, high taxes, and martial law had led to a decline in enthusiasm for the Confederate cause. Arkansas was officially readmitted to the Union in 1865.

== Background ==
Arkansas was a member of the Confederacy during the war, and provided troops, supplies, and military and political leaders. Arkansas became the 25th state of the United States on June 15, 1836, entering as a slave state.

Antebellum Arkansas was still a wilderness in most areas, rural and sparsely populated. Slavery had existed in the area since French/Spanish colonial times, but had been limited in scale until after statehood. Plantation style agriculture had taken hold in the areas of the state that had easy access to water transportation for moving cash crops, like cotton, to market. Counties bordering the Mississippi, Arkansas, White, Saline, and Ouachita rivers had the highest slave populations. Slavery existed but on a much smaller scale in the mountainous northwest and north central parts of the state. The 1850s had seen rapid economic growth in the state.

News of John Brown's Raid in Virginia in 1859 had spurred a renewed interest in the state's militia system which had been virtually dormant since the end of the War with Mexico. Like most of the United States, Arkansas had an organized militia system before the Civil War. State law required military service of most male inhabitants of a certain age. By August 1860 the state's militia consisted of 62 regiments divided into eight brigades, which comprised an eastern division and a western division. New regiments were added as the militia organization developed. Additionally, many counties and cities raised uniformed volunteer companies, which drilled more often and were better equipped than the un-uniformed militia. These volunteer companies were instrumental in the seizure of federal installations at Little Rock and Fort Smith, beginning in February 1861 before Arkansas actually seceded.

During the Presidential Election of 1860, the state voted for Southern Democratic Party candidate John C. Breckinridge, of Kentucky.

== The secession crisis ==
Abraham Lincoln's victory in the presidential election of 1860 triggered South Carolina's declaration of secession from the Union. By February 1861, six more Southern states made similar declarations. On February 7, the seven states adopted a provisional constitution and established their temporary capital at Montgomery, Alabama. A pre-war February Peace Conference of 1861 met in Washington in a failed attempt at resolving the crisis.

As the secession movement grew, people in Arkansas became greatly concerned. In January 1861 the General Assembly called an election for the people to vote on whether Arkansas should hold a convention to consider secession. At the same time the voters were to elect delegates to the convention in case the vote should be favorable. Shortly before the vote, a rump element of the Arkansas militia insubordinately and pre-emptively demanded surrender of the Federal Arsenal in Little Rock on February 8, 1861. On February 18, 1861, Arkansans voted to call a secession convention, but elected mostly Unionist delegates.

The March 1861 meeting held a strong union sentiment and voted to adjourn, subject to recall by the president of the convention, until after the people had voted on the secession question at a special election to be held in August. But attitudes changed toward secession following President Lincoln's call for 75,000 troops to put down the rebellion at Fort Sumter. Governor Rector sensed that the move toward open war would shift public opinion into the secessionist camp and he quickly organized a militia battalion to seize the Federal Arsenal at Fort Smith on April 23, 1861. Now faced with President Lincoln's demand for troops, the convention reconvened in Little Rock and, on May 6, 1861, passed the ordinance of secession by a vote of 69 to 1.

=== Organizing for war ===
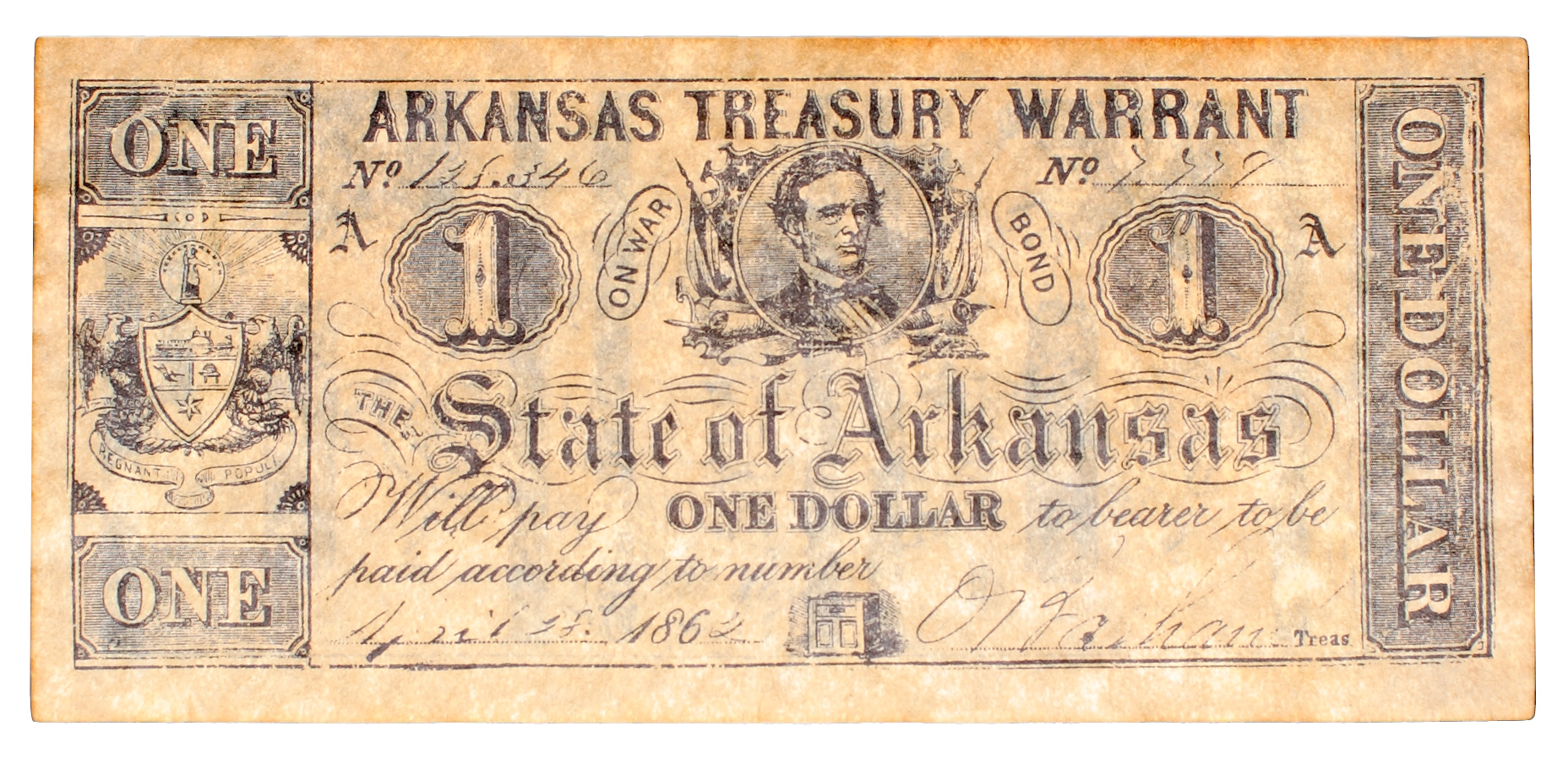
Modern reproduction of a 1862 $1 Arkansas Treasury Warrant.

The Secession Convention continued to meet and began the process of drafting a new state constitution and ordering the state's military affairs. Many in the convention were angry with the way Governor Rector utilized the militia to move the state closer to war by seizing Federal installations. As a result, the constitution sought to limit the power of the Governor by limiting his term to two years, rather than four, and vesting authority for military matters in a three-person board chaired by the Governor. The Military Board was to oversee the organization of a state army; to arm, feed, and clothe the troops; and to call out the forces for such military expeditions as might be necessary to defend the state.

The Secession Convention also adopted an ordinance providing for the organization of an "Army of Arkansas". The Army was to consist of two divisions: the 1st Division in the western portion of the state and the 2nd Division in the eastern portion of the state. Each division was to be commanded by a brigadier general.

The Convention elected three of its members as commanders of the new army: Major General James Yell of Jefferson County (overall commander) Nicholas B. Pearce, a graduate of West Point and resident of Benton County (commander of the First Division), and Thomas H. Bradley of Crittenden County (commander of the Second Division).

The Secession Convention enacted an ordinance on May 30, 1861, that called upon all the counties in the State to appoint a "home guard of minute men" for local defense, until regular military regiments could be raised and deployed. These Home Guard units were made up of old men and boys who were not eligible for normal military service. Like the militia, the Home Guard units were organized at the county level, with companies being supplied by each township.

== Confederate units ==
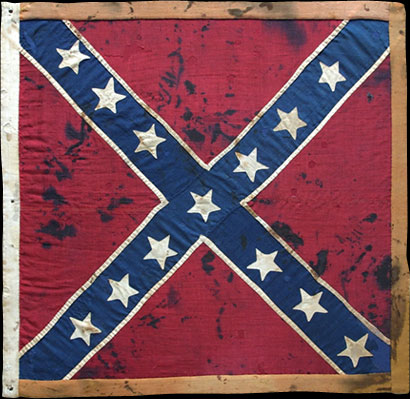
Regimental colors of the Third Arkansas (1862–63)

Arkansas formed 48 infantry regiments and over 20 cavalry regiments and 20 artillery batteries for the Confederate States Army. Most of the troops raised in Arkansas before May 1862 were transferred east of the Mississippi River and would eventually comprise a division in the Army of Tennessee. All but one infantry regiment and all of the cavalry and artillery units served most of the war in what was known as the "Western Theater", where there were few battles that were on the scale of those in the "Eastern Theater". Beginning in 1862, the Confederate States west of the Mississippi River were assigned to the Department of the Trans-Mississippi. All of the new units raised and organized after May 1862 would remain in the Trans-Mississippi for the remainder of the war.

One infantry regiment, the Third Arkansas, served in the eastern theater for the duration of the war, thus making it the state's most celebrated Confederate military unit. Attached to General Robert E. Lee's Army of Northern Virginia, the Third Arkansas would take part in almost every major Eastern battle, including the Seven Pines, Seven Days, Harper's Ferry, Antietam, Fredericksburg, Gettysburg, Chickamauga, Wilderness, and the Appomattox Campaign.

=== 1861 ===
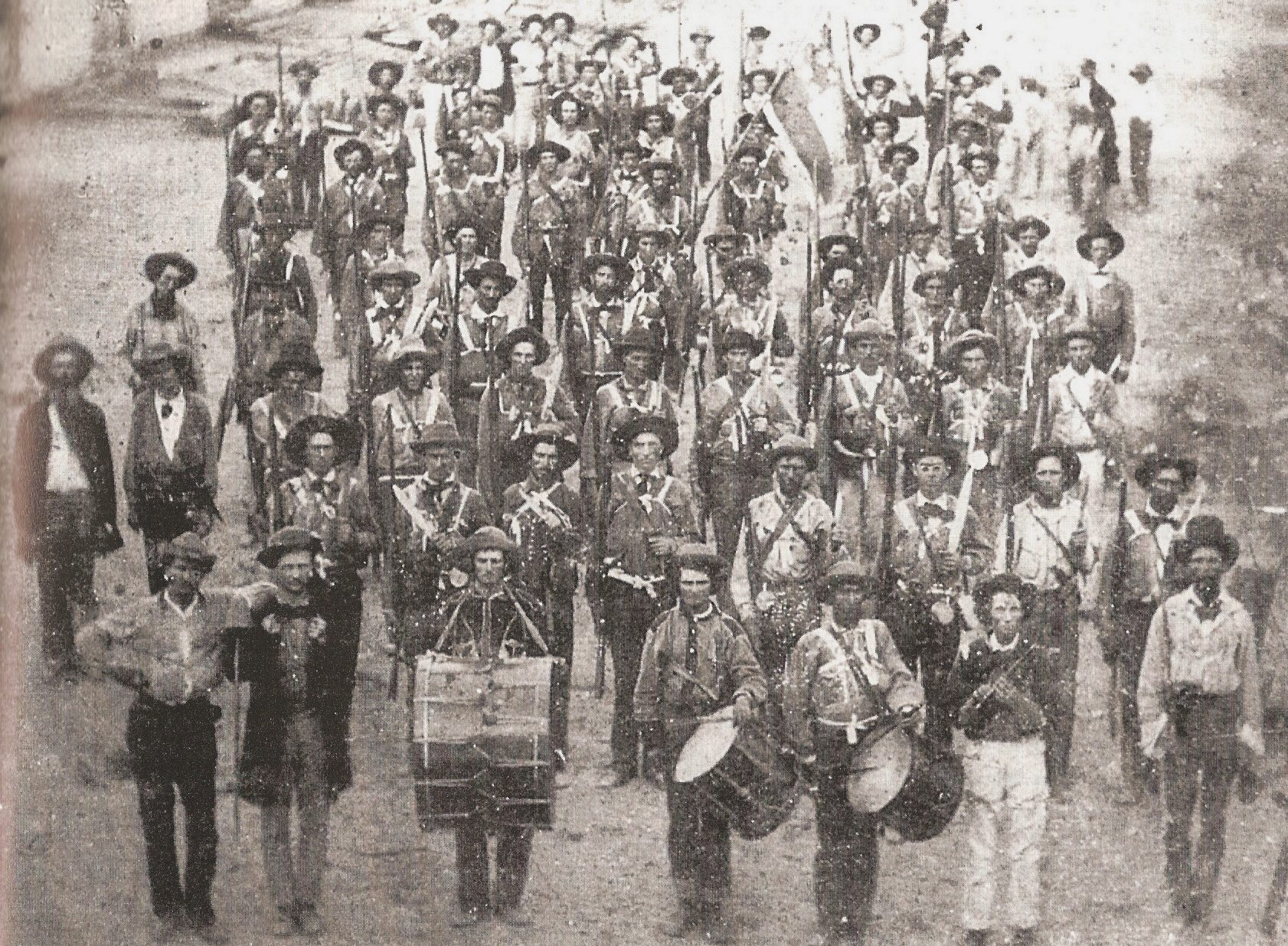
Mustering in the "Hempstead Rifles," Arkansas Volunteers, at Arkadelphia, Arkansas, in 1861.

Once Arkansas left the Union in May 1861, the existing volunteer militia companies were among the first mustered into state service and formed into new volunteer infantry regiments, also referred to as "State Troops". These new regiments comprised the Provisional Army of Arkansas. In July 1861 an agreement was reached to transfer the existing state forces into the Confederate army. The Second Division of the Army of Arkansas was transferred to the Confederate Army under the command of General William J. Hardee, but before the First Division of the Army of Arkansas could be transferred, it participated in the second major battle of the war near Springfield, Missouri, in August 1861. Arkansas "State Troops" provided the bulk of forces for the Battle of Wilson's Creek. Although the battle was a victory for the Confederacy, the Arkansas State Troops moved back to Arkansas and, after a dispute over transfer to Confederate authority, were disbanded. Most remaining Confederate forces in Arkansas were transferred east of the Mississippi River in the fall of 1861 and spent the remainder of the war serving in that theater.

In November 1861, Colonel Solon S. Borland, commanding Confederate forces at Pittman's Ferry received information regarding an impending invasion of Northeast Arkansas and issued an immediate call for militia forces to reinforce his position. The State Military Board authorized the activation of Eighth Brigade of Militia, and one company from the militia regiments of Prairie, Monroe, Poinsett, Saint Francis, and Craighead counties. The units that responded to this call were formed into three regiments of 30 Day Volunteers. Some of these companies later enrolled in regular Confederate service.

The Secession Convention's and Military Board's fears of Arkansas troops being transferred east of the Mississippi quickly became a reality. By the end of September 1861 Brigadier General William J. Hardee had transferred his new command of Arkansas troops east of the Mississippi to join what would become the Confederate Army of Tennessee. Arkansas soon found itself virtually defenseless. Governor Rector's newspaper charged: "The Confederate government has abandoned Arkansas to her fate." By November 1861 Governor Rector reported that 21 regiments had been raised for the war effort, a total of 16,000 men, and an additional 6,000 men were soon to be in the ranks.

=== 1862 ===
Many of the Arkansas regiments organized in the summer of 1861 would serve under General Albert Sidney Johnston at the Battle of Shiloh in April 1862 and would eventually be assigned to Patrick Cleburne's division of the Army of Tennessee, and the remnants would surrender with that army in North Carolina at the close of the war.

In January 1862 Major General Earl Van Dorn was dispatched to Arkansas to build a new force. He immediately issued a call to Governor Rector for the raising of additional companies. In a proclamation dated January 31, 1862, Governor Rector called for the formation of 100 new companies and four batteries, while noting:

From the best data in possession of the State authorities it is estimated that Arkansas has now 22,000 men in the Confederate Army, which is equal to 37 per cent, of her population fit or subject to military duty—the 8,500 called for making 30,500 out of 60,000, being one-half, or 50 per cent, of her entire military force.

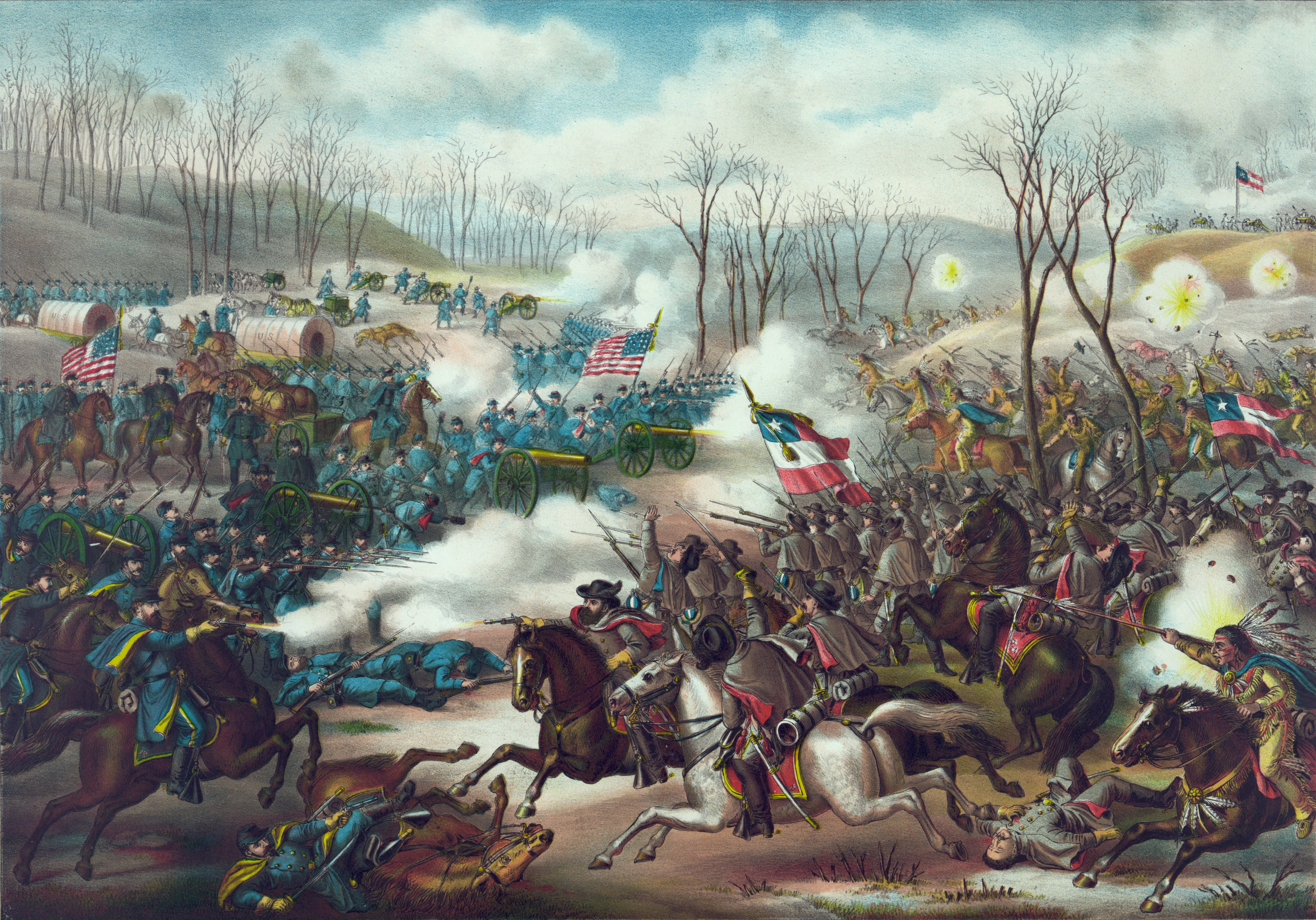
Battle of Pea Ridge in March 1862

General Van Dorn led his new Army of the West into the Battle of Pea Ridge, March 6–8, 1862. The battle was a major defeat for Southern forces in the Trans-Mississippi Theater and led to the loss of northwest Arkansas. Immediately following the battle of Pea Ridge, Van Dorn was ordered to transfer his forces east of the Mississippi River to reinforce Confederate forces in northern Mississippi, near Corinth. Van Dorn's forces were heavily engaged in operations around Corinth in the summer and fall of 1862. Brigadier General Evander McNair's Arkansas brigade of the Army of the West would eventually find itself assigned to the Army of Tennessee, and its remnants would finally surrender with that army in North Carolina at the close of the war. Other parts of the Army of the West and several Arkansas regiments which had previously served at Fort Donelson and Island No. 10 would find themselves trapped in the Siege of Vicksburg and the Siege of Port Hudson in the summer of 1863.

As Van Dorn was leaving the state, Major General Samuel Curtis, the victor of the battle of Pea Ridge, began an invasion of Arkansas in early April. He moved his 17,000-man army back into Missouri to take advantage of better transportation routes and headed east. He established his base of supply at Rolla, Missouri. Curtis reached West Plains, Missouri, on April 29 and turned southwards into Arkansas. During the first part of May, Curtis and Steele encountered numerous logistical difficulties. Poor weather, difficult terrain, and lack of consistent resupply slowed their progress. But by May 9, Curtis' large, but ill-supplied, force had emerged from the Ozark foothills onto flat ground at Searcy. It was poised to strike deep into central Arkansas and seize Little Rock itself as soon as supplies were gathered.

Major General Van Dorn left the state, but Brigadier General John S. Roane refused to go with him, declaring that Arkansas troops should be left to defend their state. Van Dorn detached Roane and left him in command of the Arkansas military, but with virtually no organized forces for the defense of the state. Roane approached Governor Rector for assistance in raising new forces. Rector told Roane to stop any troops passing through the state and use them for the state's defense. General Roane set to work immediately in cobbling together a defense to meet the approaching Union Army. Roane stopped elements of the 12th Texas Cavalry that were bound for the eastern theaters and ordered troops who had made it as far as Memphis, Tennessee, to turn around. Some attempts at recruiting local volunteers were made, but with little success. On May 10, Roane sent Texas cavalry as scouts to determine the federal position. The scouts encountered numerous refugees fleeing the Union Army. The refugees reported that the Union forces numbered about 30,000, mostly German immigrants. Hindman had approximately 1,200 Texas horsemen to confront this force. He ordered cotton stores near Searcy destroyed, and Governor Rector prepared government offices for evacuation. Meanwhile, small advance parties from the Union Army clashed with the Texas scouts between Searcy and Little Rock. On May 19, several companies of the Texas cavalry and a few local Arkansas companies achieved a small, but psychologically important victory over General Curtis's foraging parties at the Battle of Whitney's Lane.

On May 1, 1862, Governor Rector, realizing that Major General Samuel Curtis' army was on the way to capture Little Rock, abandoned the city and moved the state government to Hot Springs, Arkansas. For the first three weeks of May 1862, there was no military or state government in Little Rock. Roane traveled to Pine Bluff and enlisted the help of Arkansas Militia Major General James Yell in recruiting a new Army of the Southwest in the Department of Arkansas. Yell was a "States Defense first" advocate and lent his power to aiding Roane along with Senator Robert W. Johnson, also of Pine Bluff. These three men were the backbone of the newly reconstituted army of the Trans-Mississippi Department. In the meantime, Governor Rector sent dispatches to President Jefferson Davis threatening to secede from the Confederacy unless Davis sent some sort of support. Davis' answer came in the form of the CSS Pontchartrain and CSS Maurepas, which were dispatched to Little Rock. The state government did not return to Little Rock until the Pontchartrain arrived. A week later, on May 31, 1862, Major General Thomas C. Hindman arrived to take command from Roane and ordered all troops in Pine Bluff to Little Rock.

Hindman was dispatched to take command of what had been designated as the Confederate Department of the Trans-Mississippi. When Hindman arrived, Union forces were still moving south from Batesville and threatening the state capitol of Little Rock. Hindman found that his command was "bare of soldiers, penniless, defenseless, and dreadfully exposed" to the Federal Army that was approaching dangerously from the northwest. He set to work and issued a series of harsh military edicts, instituting conscription, authorizing guerrilla warfare and requisitioning supplies for the defense of the State. With the assistance of the Texas troops diverted by General Roane, Hindman commenced a campaign of misinformation designed to mislead Federal authorities about the strength of the state's defenses. Hindman sent a combined force of Texas troops and newly formed and hastily cobbled together Arkansas units to confront Curtis at the Battle of Cotton Plant, on July 7, 1862. This series of events, combined with harassing tactics, confused the Federal authorities, causing them to fear that they did not have an adequate supply line to conquer the state and they soon diverted from a course towards the capital and instead moved to Helena to reestablish a solid supply line.

Through rigorous enforcement of new Confederate conscription laws, Hindman was able to raise a new army in Arkansas in the summer of 1862. Hindman's tactics had questionable legal authority. The Confederate Conscription Act of April 1862 had expressly forbid the raising of new units through conscription. The intent of the law had been to provide replacements to the existing Confederate regiments in the field for the losses that they had already experienced through disease, desertion and battlefield loss. Hindman's problem was that General Van Dorn had taken virtually every organized regiment in the state with him to Mississippi. Hindman turned a blind eye to this legal challenge and began aggressively recruiting. To encourage volunteers, Hindman announced that volunteer companies raised before a certain date would be allowed to elect their own officers, as was the custom, while conscript companies would have their officers appointed. Hindman did have a ready supply of experienced officers to help him in his reorganization. In early May 1862, Confederate forces in northern Mississippi underwent an army-wide reorganization due to the passage of the Conscription Act by the Confederate Congress in April 1862. All twelve-month regiments had to re-muster and enlist for two additional years or the duration of the war; a new election of officers was ordered; and men who were exempted from service by age or other reasons under the Conscription Act were allowed to take a discharge and go home. Officers who did not choose to stand for re-election were also offered a discharge. The reorganization was accomplished among all the Arkansas regiments in and around Corinth, Mississippi, in May 1862. During its reorganization, a number of senior officers from the Arkansas regiments east of the Mississippi, such as Colonels James Fleming Fagan, Robert G. Shaver, Simon P. Hughes, and Alexander T. Hawthorn resigned their original commands and returned to Arkansas and assisted Hindman in organizing new units in the summer of 1862.

Hindman sent numerous requests for arms back across the Mississippi River. Many weapons were transferred to the Trans Mississippi District from Vicksburg in what became known as the "Fairplay Affair." A shipment of 18,000 arms were dispatched to Pine Bluff from Vicksburg, Miss. by way of Monroe, La., but 5,000 of those 18,000 were captured on the steamer Fair Play by Union forces, and 2,500 arms were redirected to Major-General Richard Taylor's army in Louisiana. Only 11,000 arms made it to Pine Bluff. These weapons had come from the arsenal of eastern Confederate states that had been returned to the state arsenals as the Confederates had re-equipped themselves with the better captured Union arms. Most of the guns were castoffs and unusable weapons from the various state armories which had been returned to the armories after the Confederate armies east of the Mississippi had been re-equipped from the "Battlefield Quartermaster" of Seven Days Battles, Second Manassas and Harper Ferry.

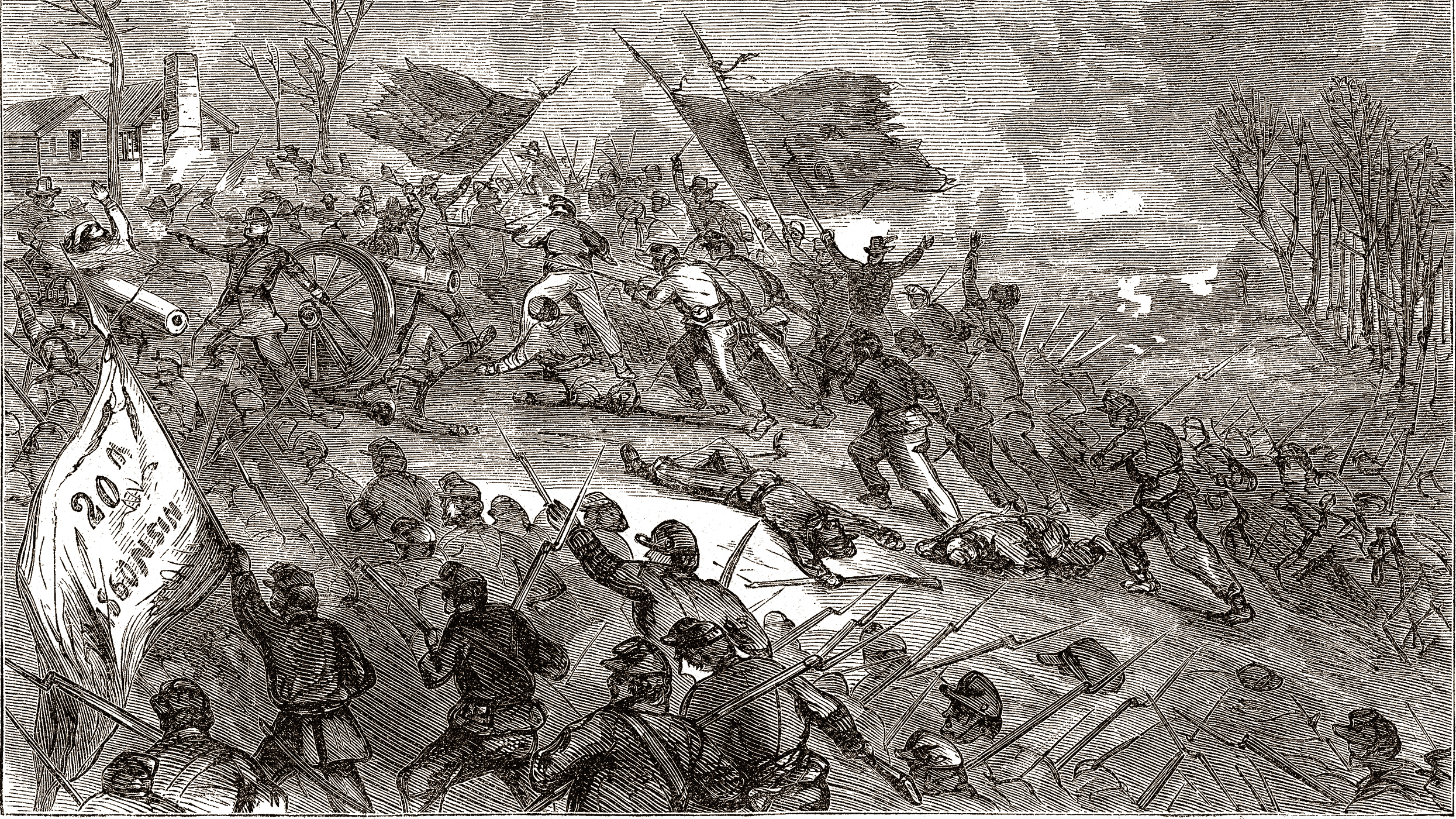
Battle of Prairie Grove in December 1862

The Arkansas secession convention, while drafting the new state constitution in 1861, had shortened the term of office for the governor from four years to two years. This necessitated an election in the fall of 1862. Colonel Harris Flanagin of the 2nd Arkansas Mounted Rifles was elected governor of Arkansas. After he was recalled from active duty to take office, his administration dealt primarily with war-related measures and maintaining order and continuing government while undergoing an invasion. His administration was faced with shortages of critical items, rising prices, care of fallen soldiers' families, and related problems.

Hindman's aggressive tactics caused complaints that he was ruling by martial law, which led the Confederate government to send Lieutenant-General Theophilus H. Holmes to assume command of the newly established Trans-Mississippi Department. Hindman was retained as commander of the 1st Corps, Trans-Mississippi Army, and led this new force, composed largely of conscripts, in an attempt to clear northwest Arkansas of Union forces. Hindman's offensive ended in defeat at Prairie Grove on December 7, 1862.

=== 1863 ===
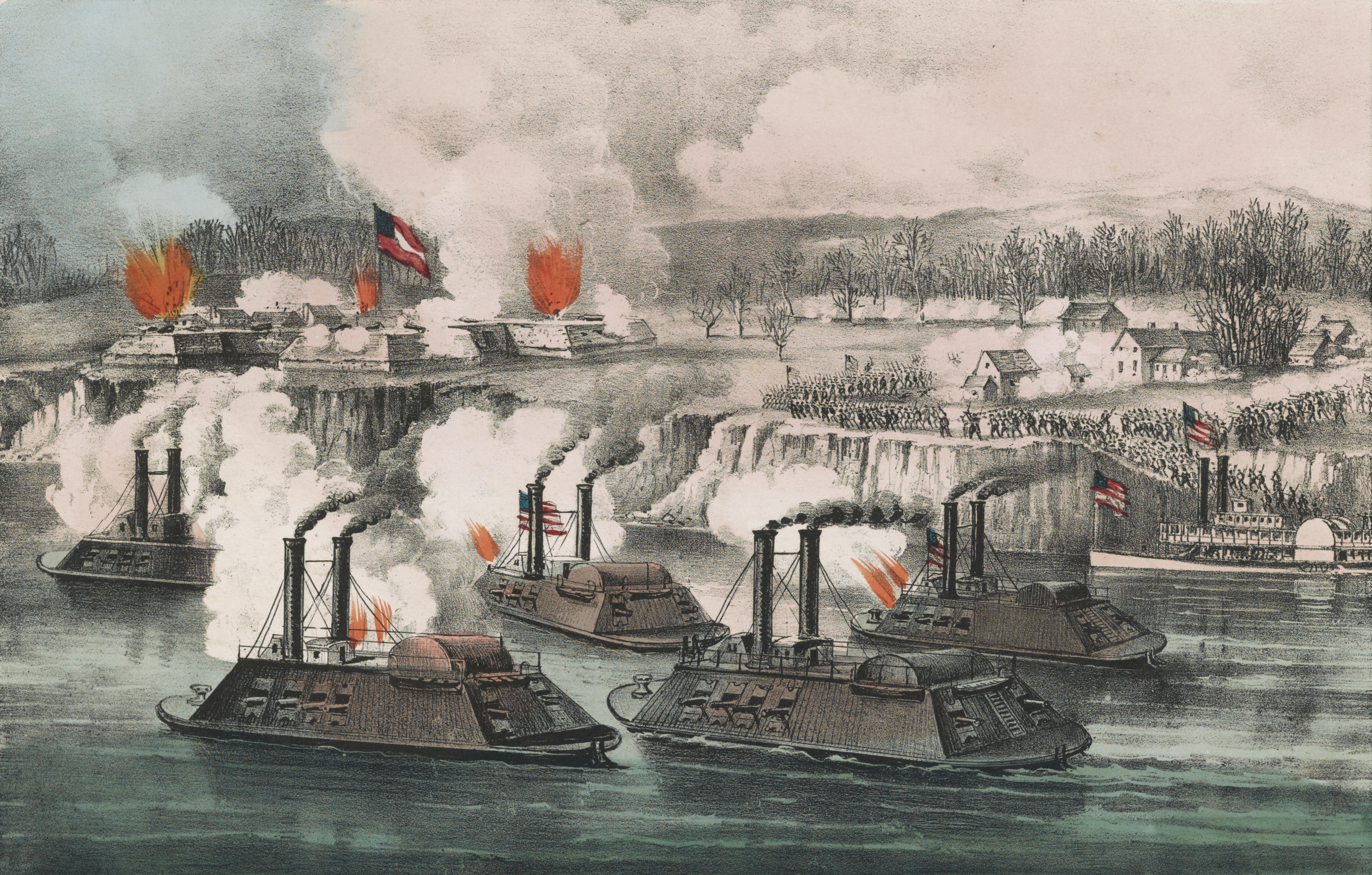
Bombardment and capture of Fort Hindman at Arkansas Post in 1863

The new year did not bring good news to Confederates in Arkansas. When the Emancipation Proclamation went into effect on January 1, 1863, Union forces occupied northwestern Arkansas. Local Union commanders, who had been aggressively enforcing the Confiscation Acts to grant freedom to slaves of rebel owners, put the Proclamation into effect immediately, freeing many slaves in the area. In 1862, the Confederate Army had constructed a massive defensive earthwork at Arkansas Post, on the Mississippi River, known as Fort Hindman. It was located on a bluff 25 feet above the river on the north bank, with a mile view up and downriver. It was designed to prevent Union forces from going upriver to Little Rock, and to disrupt Union movement on the Mississippi. On January 9–11 of 1863, Union forces conducted an amphibious assault on the fortress backed by ironclad gunboats as part of the Vicksburg Campaign. Union forces outnumbered the defenders (33,000 to 5,500) and won an easy victory in capturing the post, with most of the Confederate garrison surrendering.

The Battle of Fayetteville occurred on April 18, 1863, when Confederate General William Cabell attacked the federal outpost in Northwest Arkansas. It was a battle between Arkansas Confederates and Arkansas Unionists, a true civil war struggle. The attack was unsuccessful, and the Union forces under Colonial M. LaRue Harrison held the field at the end of the day. However, the attack exposed the weakness of the post, and the Union troops were withdrawn to Missouri a week later.

General Hindman was transferred to a new command back east of the Mississippi in the Army of the Tennessee, leaving Holmes and Major General Sterling Price of Missouri in command in Arkansas. Arkansas troops spent much of the winter and spring in camp near Little Rock. Under pressure from Richmond to attempt to relieve federal pressure on Vicksburg, Mississippi, General Holmes moved his army across the state and attacked the Union supply depot at Helena. The Confederate attack was repulsed at the Battle of Helena on July 3, 1863, which was the same day that Vicksburg fell to Union forces. In late August, 1863, Union forces from Indian Territory moved on Fort Smith and captured the city on September 1, 1863. In July 1862, Lincoln installed Colonel John S. Phelps as Military Governor of Arkansas, though he resigned soon after due to poor health.

External video
- Book TV interview with Mark Christ on Civil War Arkansas 1863, March 7, 2012, C-SPAN

With the Union base at Helena now secure, Major-General Frederick Steele decided it was time to seize the state capitol at Little Rock. Price, commanding the District of Arkansas in place of Holmes, opposed Steele's advance with his cavalry forces while strengthening the northern approaches to the city. Clashes occurred at Brownsville, West Point, Harrison's Landing, Reed's Bridge, and Ashley's Mills (or Ferry Landing). Steele ultimately outflanked Price's defensive preparations by crossing the Arkansas River and attacking from the south side of the river. Confederate forces opposed this attack at the Battle of Bayou Fourche, near the current Clinton National Airport on September 10, 1863. Ultimately, Price decided to abandon the city rather than risk being trapped in a siege operation. Confederate forces retreated to southwestern Arkansas and established winter quarters. Governor Flanagin took the state archives and moved first to Arkadelphia, and then on to Washington in Hempstead County where he set up a new capitol.

After the fall of Little Rock, Governor Flanagin ordered out the militia regiments of Clark, Hempstead, Sevier, Pike, Polk, Montgomery, La Fayette, Ouachita, Union, and Columbia counties and directed them to supply mounted companies for new regiments of state troops. This recruiting method succeeded in supplying several new mounted companies that participated in resisting Union General Steele's Camden Expedition in the spring of 1864. The fall of Little Rock provided the opportunity to create a new pro-Union state government.

=== 1864 ===
The fall of the capitol at Little Rock to Union troops in 1863 opened the door to the establishment of a new Union government under Isaac Murphy on April 18, 1864. The Murphy government struggled to gain recognition from Union authorities as the legitimate state government as President Lincoln and radical republicans in congress were battling over terms to be imposed on seceded states. With the state capital and Fort Smith in Union control, Union leaders withdrew many Union forces from Arkansas to reinforce armies operating east of the Mississippi river, leaving the Murphy government powerless in areas beyond the reach of Union garrisons along the Arkansas river valley. Intense guerrilla warfare ensued in the virtual no-mans land north of the Arkansas River and into southern Missouri.

The next major military action in Arkansas was the Camden Expedition (March 23 – May 2, 1864). Steele and his United States Army troops stationed at Little Rock and Fort Smith were ordered to march to Shreveport, Louisiana. There, Steele was supposed to link up with a separate Federal amphibious expedition which was advancing up the Red River Valley. The combined Union force was then to strike into Texas. However, the two pincers never converged, and Steele's columns suffered terrible losses in a series of battles with Confederates led by Sterling Price and General E. Kirby Smith at the Battle of Marks' Mills, Battle of Poison Spring and the Battle of Jenkins' Ferry. Ultimately Union forces managed to escape back to Little Rock where they basically remained for the duration of the war.

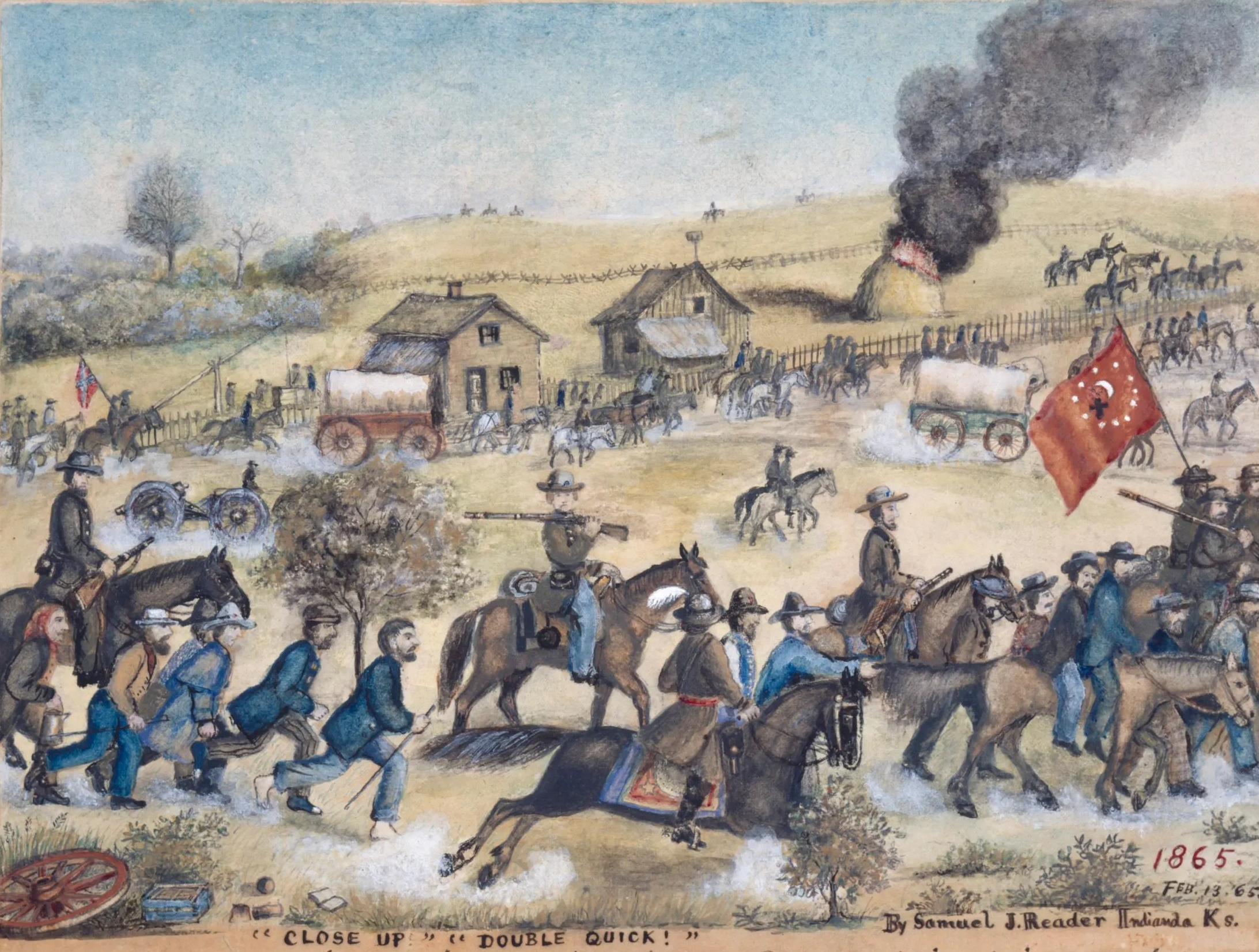
Price's Missouri Raid in October 1864

The victory by Confederates in the Red River Campaign and its Arkansas segment, the Camden Expedition, opened a brief window of opportunity for Arkansas Confederates. Brigadier General Joseph O. Shelby was dispatched to northeast Arkansas with his cavalry brigade and began recruiting anew. Throughout the summer of 1864, Confederate strength in northeast Arkansas steadily grew with many men who had either deserted or become separated from their previous commands returning to Confederate service. The last formation of new Confederate units occurred during this time with the formation of the 45th through the 48th Arkansas Mounted Infantry units. Several existing Arkansas units were converted to mounted infantry and dispatched to northeast Arkansas.

With these strengthened units, Shelby was able to seriously threaten vital Union lines of communication along the Arkansas River between Helena and Little Rock, and for a time it appeared that the Confederates would mount a serious attempt to retake the Federal held state capitol. However, Confederate authorities in Richmond pressured Smith to dispatch some of his infantry to reinforce Confederate armies east of the Mississippi. This caused an uproar among the Arkansas Confederate infantry and, as a compromise, Smith approved a plan by Price to organize a large-scale cavalry raid into Missouri that would coincide with the U.S. presidential election. Arkansas cavalry played a major part in the Trans-Mississippi Department's offensive operation into Union controlled territory, which lasted from August 29 to December 2, 1864. Following Price's disastrous defeat at Westport on October 23, all Arkansas cavalry units returned to the state where a majority were furloughed for the rest of the Civil War.

=== 1865 ===
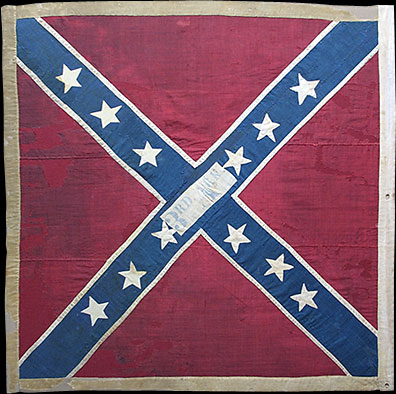
Regimental Color of the Third Arkansas (1863–65)

On April 9, 1865, the Third Arkansas was among the regiments that surrendered with the Army of Northern Virginia at Appomattox. The remnants of Patrick Cleburne's division of Arkansas troops surrendered with the Army of Tennessee at Bennett Place near Durham Station, North Carolina, on April 26, 1865. The Jackson Light Artillery was among the last of the Confederate troops east of the Mississippi to surrender. The remnants of the Jackson Light Artillery aided in the defense of Mobile and surrendered with the Department of Alabama, Mississippi, and East Louisiana. The battery spiked its guns and surrendered at Meridian, Mississippi, on May 11, 1865.

The Arkansas infantry regiments assigned to the Department of the Trans-Mississippi were surrendered on May 26, 1865. When the Trans-Mississippi Department surrendered, all of the Arkansas infantry regiments were encamped in and around Marshall, Texas, since war-ravaged Arkansas was no longer able to provide adequate sustenance to the army. The regiments were ordered to report to Shreveport, Louisiana, to be paroled. None of them did so. Some soldiers went to Shreveport on their own to be paroled, but the regiments simply disbanded without formally surrendering.

Most of the Arkansas cavalry units were surrendered by Brigadier General M. Jeff Thompson, Commander of the Army of the Northern Sub-District of Arkansas. General Thompson agreed to surrender his command at Chalk Bluff on May 11, 1865, and agreed to have his men assemble at Wittsburg and Jacksonport to lay down their arms and receive their paroles. The cavalry units formally surrendered and were paroled at either Wittsburg on May 25 or at Jacksonport on June 5. Ultimately Thompson surrendered about seventy-five hundred men all total that were under his command consisting of 1,964 enlisted men with 193 officers paroled at Wittsburg in May 1865 and 4,854 enlisted men with 443 officers paroled at Jacksonport on June 6, 1865. Many smaller commands surrendered at various Union posts, including Fort Smith, Pine Bluff and Little Rock in May and June 1865.

The United States government organized the Fort Smith Council at Fort Smith in September 1865. The purpose of the series of meetings was to discuss the future treaties and land allocations following the close of the American Civil War and involved Indian tribes east of the Rockies. Under the Military Reconstruction Act, Congress readmitted Arkansas to the Union in June 1868.

== Battles in Arkansas ==
The following is a list of American Civil War engagements fought in Arkansas between 1862 and 1865:

Battle	Start	End
Skirmish at Adam's Bluff	June 30, 1862	June 30, 1862
Battle of Arkansas Post	January 9, 1863	January 11, 1863
Action at Ashley's Station	August 24, 1864	August 24, 1864
Skirmish at Ashley's Mills	September 7, 1863	September 7, 1863
Engagement at Bayou Fourche	September 10, 1863	September 10, 1863
Skirmish at Brownsville	August 25, 1863	August 25, 1863
Battle of Cane Hill	November 28, 1862	November 28, 1862
Battle of Chalk Bluff	May 1, 1863	May 2, 1863
Battle of Dardanelle	January 14, 1865	January 14, 1865
Battle of Devil's Backbone	September 1, 1863	September 1, 1863
Battle of Dunagin's Farm	February 17, 1862	February 17, 1862
Battle of Elkin's Ferry	April 3, 1864	April 4, 1864
Action at Fayetteville	April 18, 1863	April 18, 1863
Action at Fitzhugh's Woods	April 1, 1864	April 1, 1864
Action at Fort Smith	July 31, 1864	July 31, 1864
Battle of Helena	July 4, 1863	July 4, 1863
Battle of Hill's Plantation	July 7, 1862	July 7, 1862
Battle of Ivey's Ford	January 17, 1865	January 17, 1865
Engagement at Jenkins' Ferry	April 30, 1864	April 30, 1864
Skirmish at Jonesboro	August 2, 1862	August 2, 1862
Skirmish at L' Anguille Ferry	August 3, 1862	August 3, 1862
Battle of Marks' Mills	April 25, 1864	April 25, 1864
Action at Massard Prairie	July 27, 1864	July 27, 1864
Battle of McGuire's Store	October 28, 1862	October 28, 1862
Battle of Mount Elba	March 30, 1864	March 30, 1864
Battle of Old River Lake	June 5, 1864	June 6, 1864
Battle of Elkhorn Tavern	March 6, 1862	March 8, 1862
Action at Pine Bluff	October 25, 1863	October 25, 1863
Skirmish at Pitman's Ferry	October 27, 1862	October 27, 1862
Battle of Poison Spring	April 18, 1864	April 18, 1864
Action at Pott's Hill	February 16, 1862	February 16, 1862
Battle of Prairie D' Ane	April 9, 1864	April 14, 1864
Battle of Prairie Grove	December 7, 1862	December 7, 1862
Battle of Reed's Bridge	August 27, 1863	August 27, 1863
Battle of Saint Charles	June 17, 1862	June 17, 1862
Battle of Salem	March 13, 1862	March 13, 1862
Skirmishes at Taylor's Creek and Mount Vernon	May 11, 1863	May 11, 1863
Skirmish at Terre Noire Creek	April 2, 1864	April 2, 1864
Battle of Van Buren	December 28, 1862	December 28, 1862
Action at Wallace's Ferry	July 26, 1864	July 26, 1864
Battle of Whitney's Lane	May 19, 1862	May 19, 1862

== Notable Confederate leaders from Arkansas ==
Arkansans of note during the American Civil War include Confederate Major-General Patrick Cleburne. Considered by many to be one of the most brilliant Confederate division commanders of the war, Cleburne is often referred to as "The Stonewall of the West." Also of note is Major-General Thomas C. Hindman, a former United States Representative, who commanded Confederate forces at the Battle of Cane Hill and Battle of Prairie Grove.

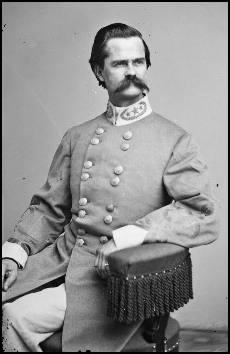
Brigadier General
William N. R. Beall

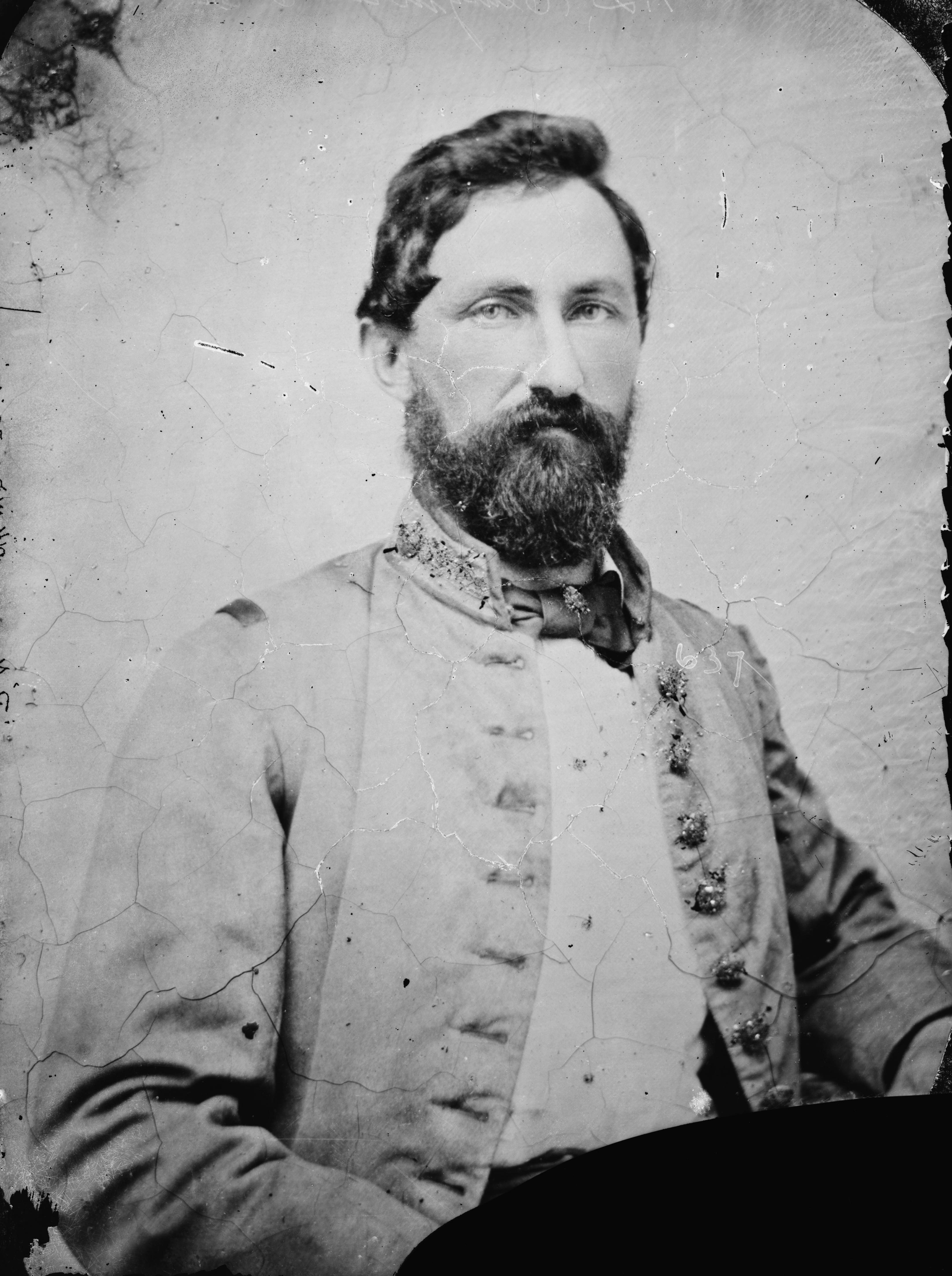
Brigadier General
William L. Cabell

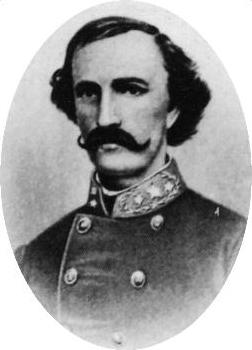
Major General
Thomas J. Churchill

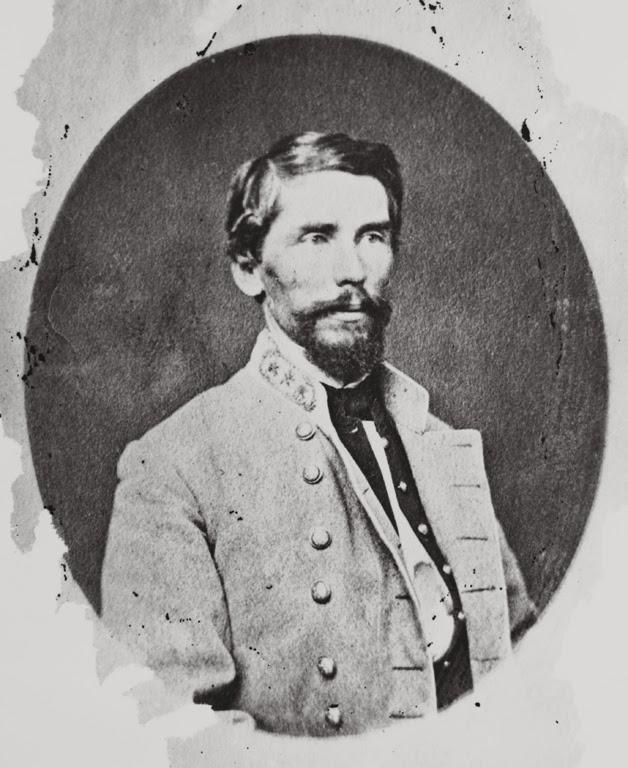
Major General
Patrick Cleburne

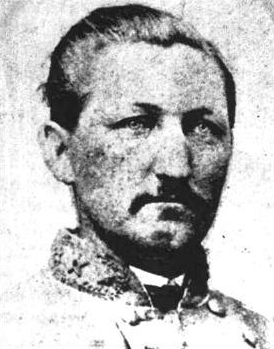
Brigadier General
Thomas P. Dockery

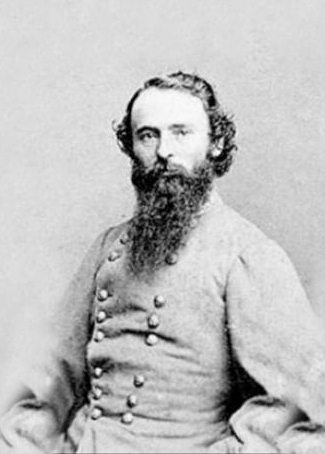
Major General
James F. Fagan

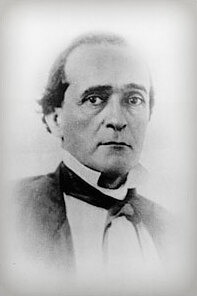
Governor
Harris Flanagin

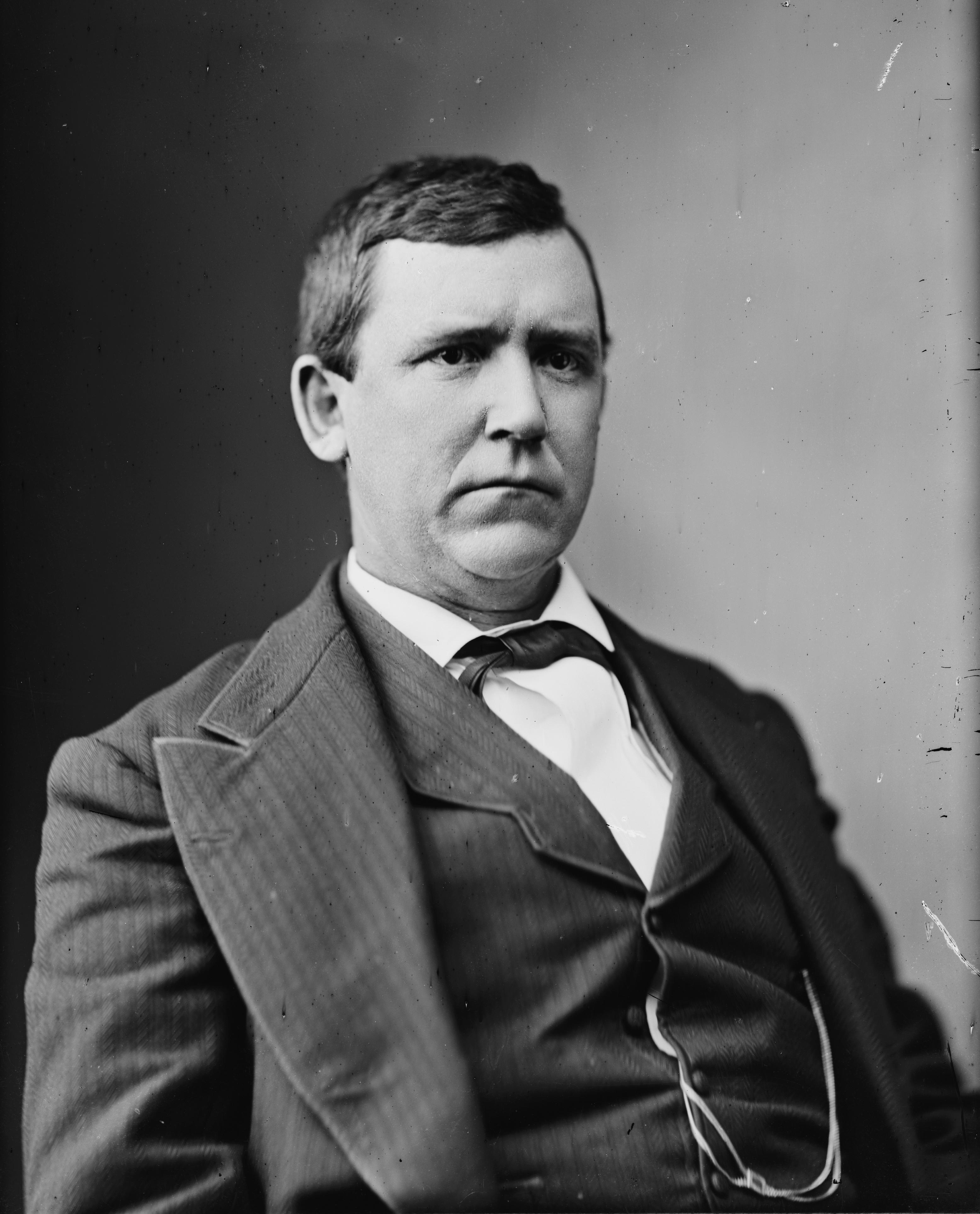
Senator
Augustus H. Garland

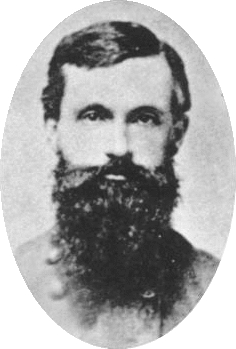
Brigadier General
Daniel C. Govan

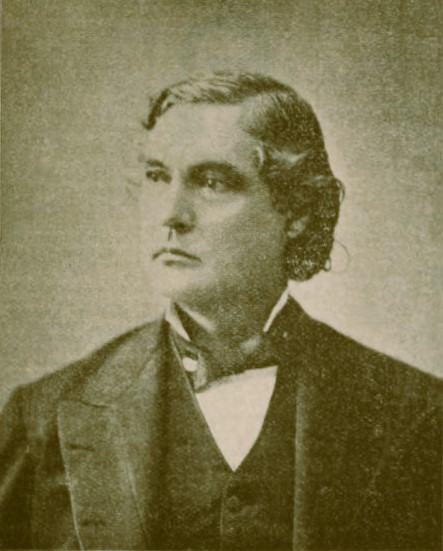
Brigadier General
Alexander T. Hawthorn

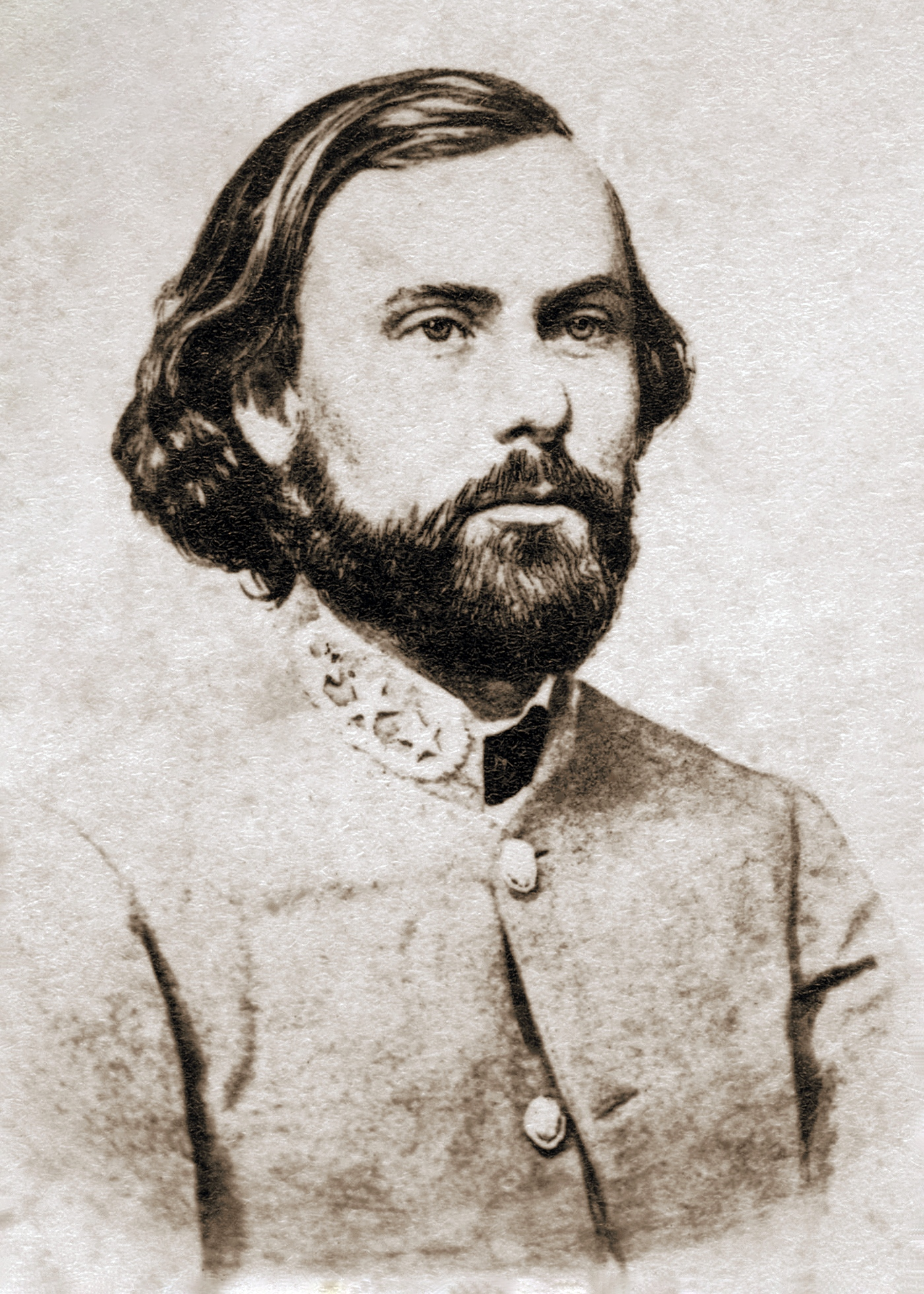
Major General
Thomas C. Hindman

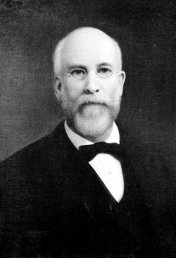
Governor
Simon P. Hughes

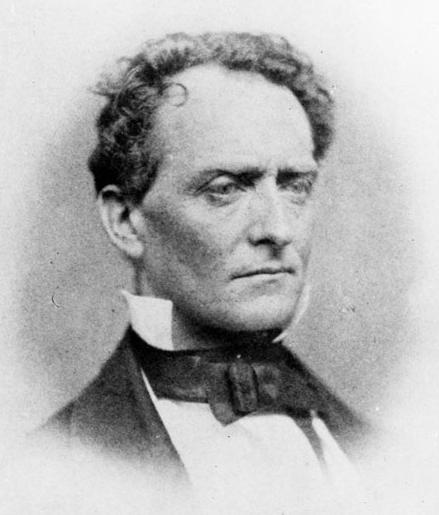
Senator
Robert W. Johnson

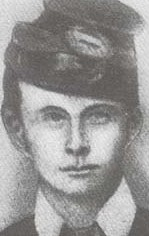
Brigadier General
John H. Kelly

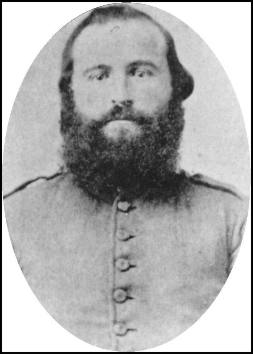
Brigadier General
James M. McIntosh

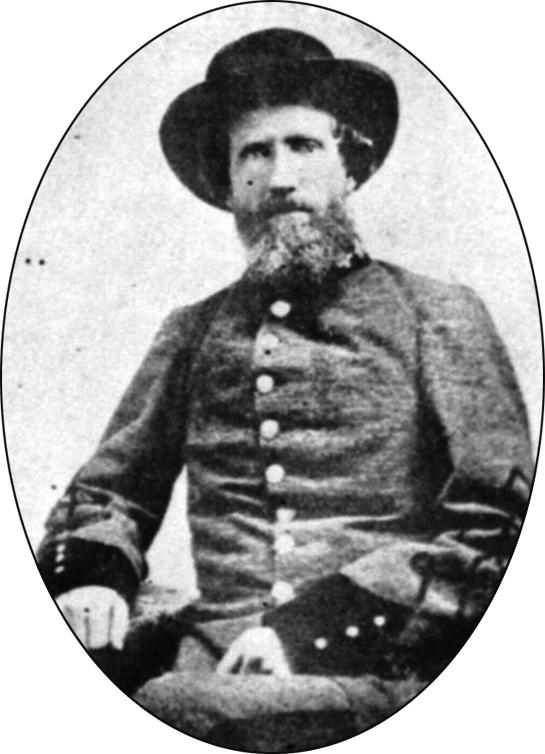
Brigadier General
Evander McNair

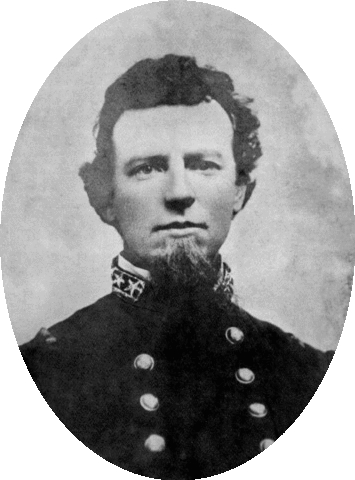
Brigadier General
Dandridge McRae

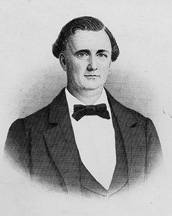
Senator
Charles B. Mitchel

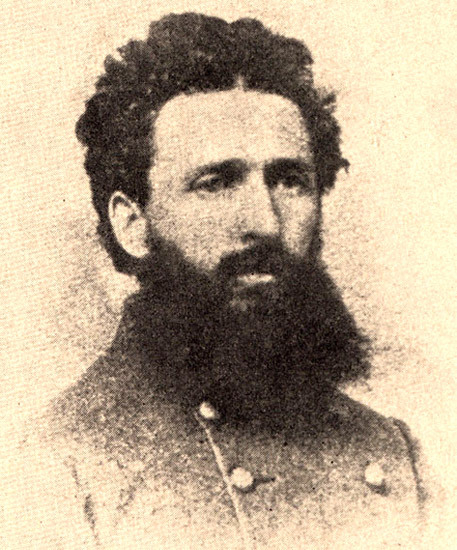
Brigadier General
Nicholas B. Pearce

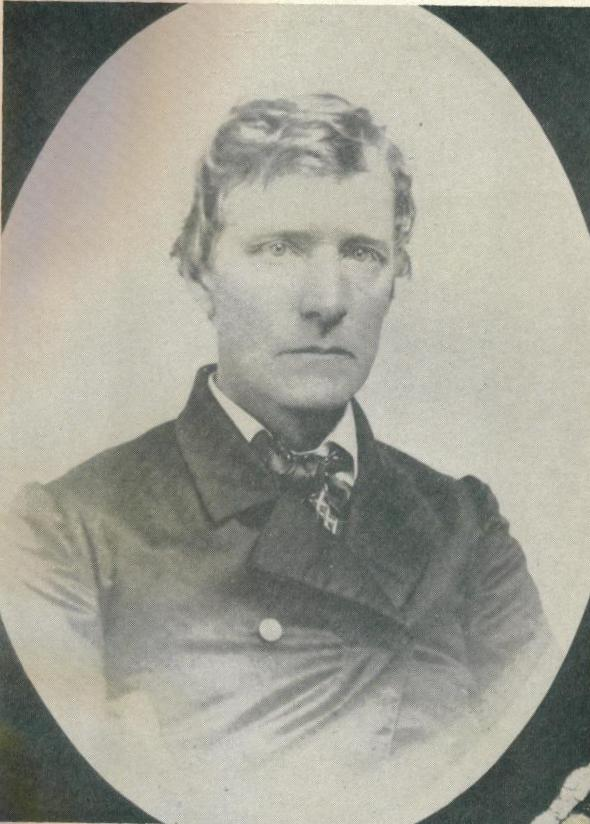
Adjutant General
Gordon N. Peay

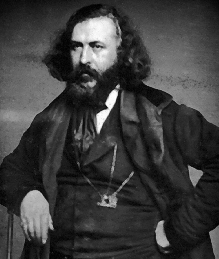
Brigadier General
Albert Pike

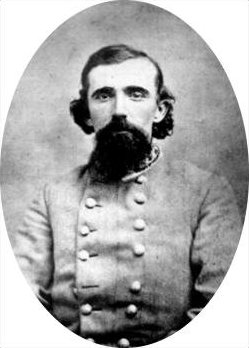
Brigadier General
Lucius E. Polk

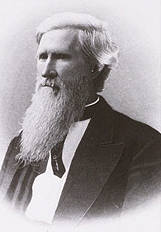
Governor
Henry M. Rector

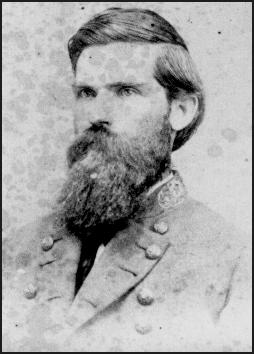
Brigadier General
Daniel H. Reynolds

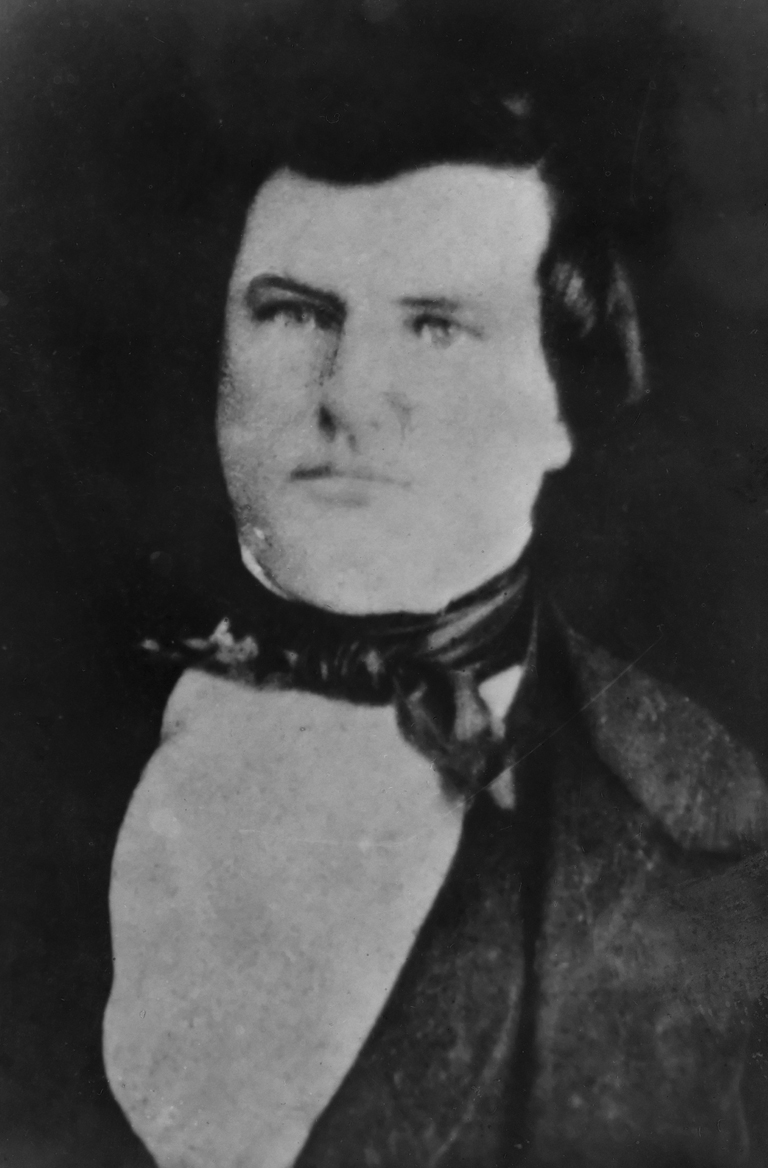
Brigadier General
John S. Roane

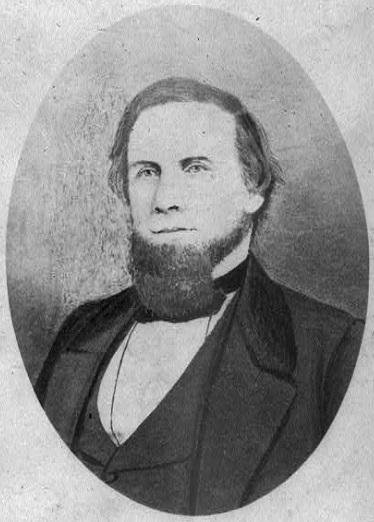
Brigadier General
Albert Rust

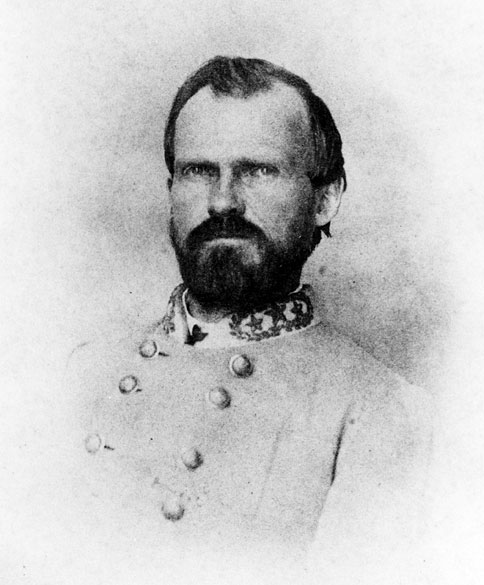
Brigadier General
James C. Tappan

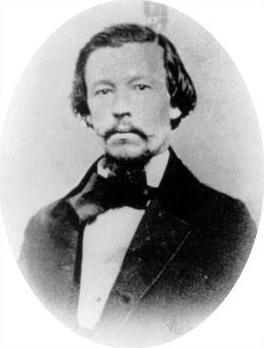
Brigadier General
Lucius M. Walker

== Notable Union leaders from Arkansas ==
Although Arkansas sided with the Confederacy, not all Arkansans supported the Confederate cause. Beginning with the fall of Little Rock to Union forces in 1863, Arkansans supporting the Union formed four infantry regiments, four cavalry regiments, and an artillery battery to serve in the United States Army. Additionally, six infantry regiments and one artillery battery of African Descent were attributed to the state. Later these units that were originally designated as the "1st-6th Arkansas Volunteers of African Descent" were re-designated as the 46th, 54th, 56th, 57th, 112th and 113th United States Colored Troops.

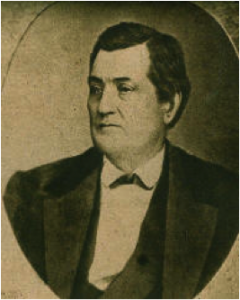
Colonel
Elisha Baxter

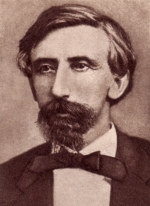
Adjutant General
Albert W. Bishop

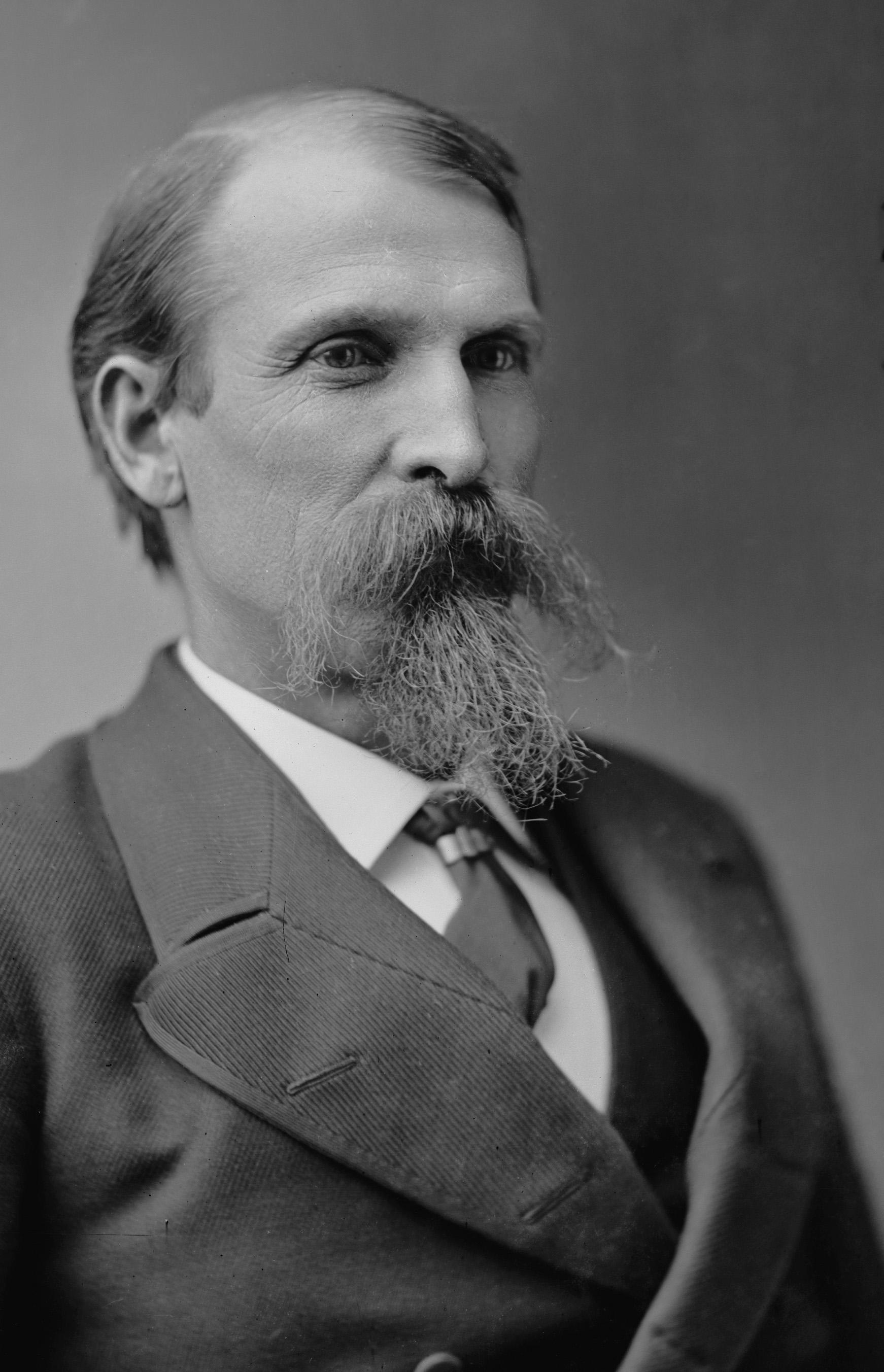
Brigadier General
Powell F. Clayton

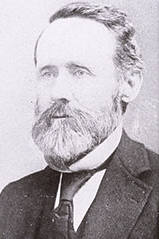
Colonel
William M. Fishback

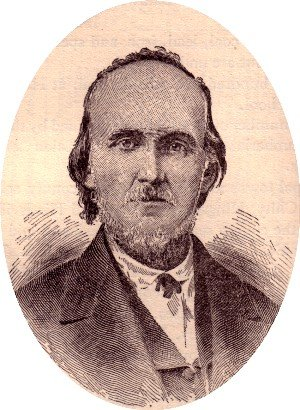
Governor
Isaac Murphy

Colonel
John E. Phelps

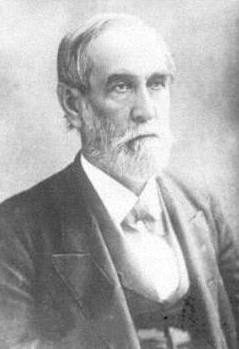
Military Governor
John S. Phelps

== Restoration to Union ==
As stipulated by the Reconstruction Acts during the Reconstruction period, Arkansas and Mississippi were part of the Fourth Military District of the U.S. Army. At various times, the district was commanded by generals Edward Ord, Alvan Cullem Gillem, and Adelbert Ames.

After meeting the requirements of Reconstruction, including ratifying amendments to the US Constitution to abolish slavery and grant citizenship to former slaves, Arkansas's representatives were readmitted to Congress. The state was fully restored to the United States on June 22, 1868, becoming the second former Confederate state to gain readmission to the Union (after Tennessee in July 1866).

== Image gallery ==
Arkansas in the American Civil War gallery

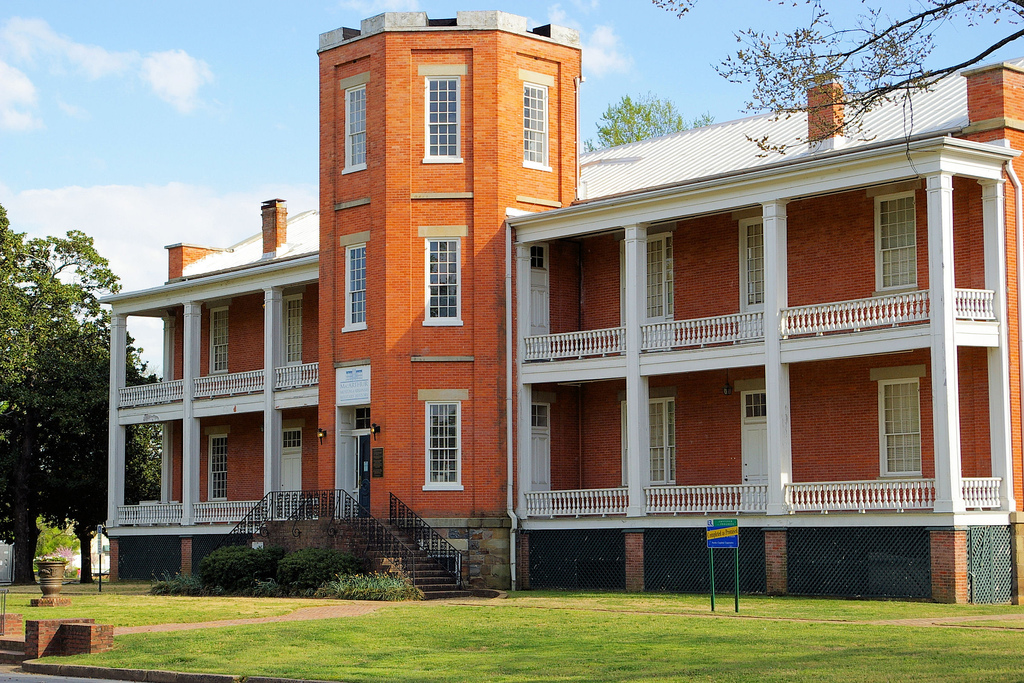
Museum of
Arkansas Military History

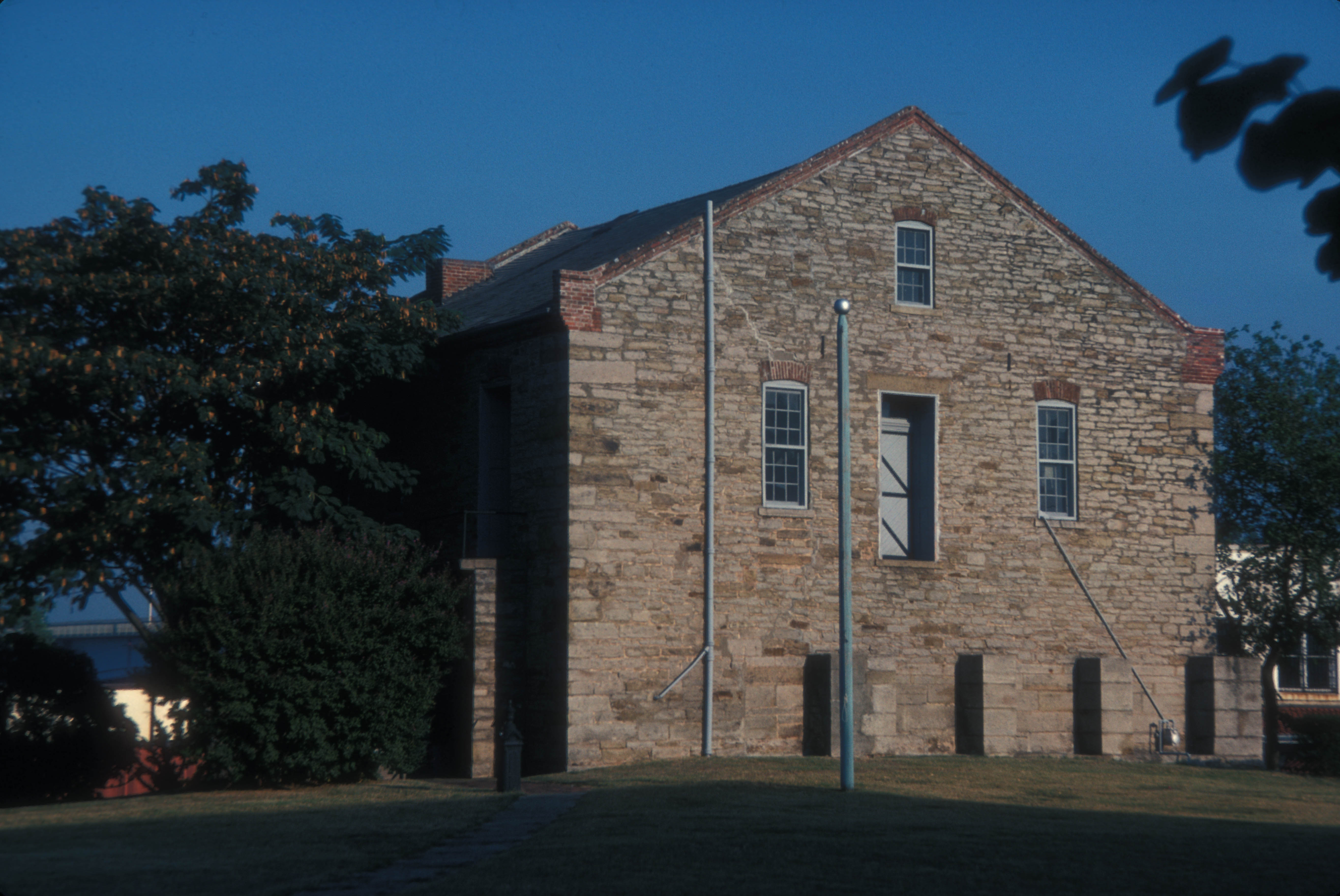
Fort Smith
National Historic Site

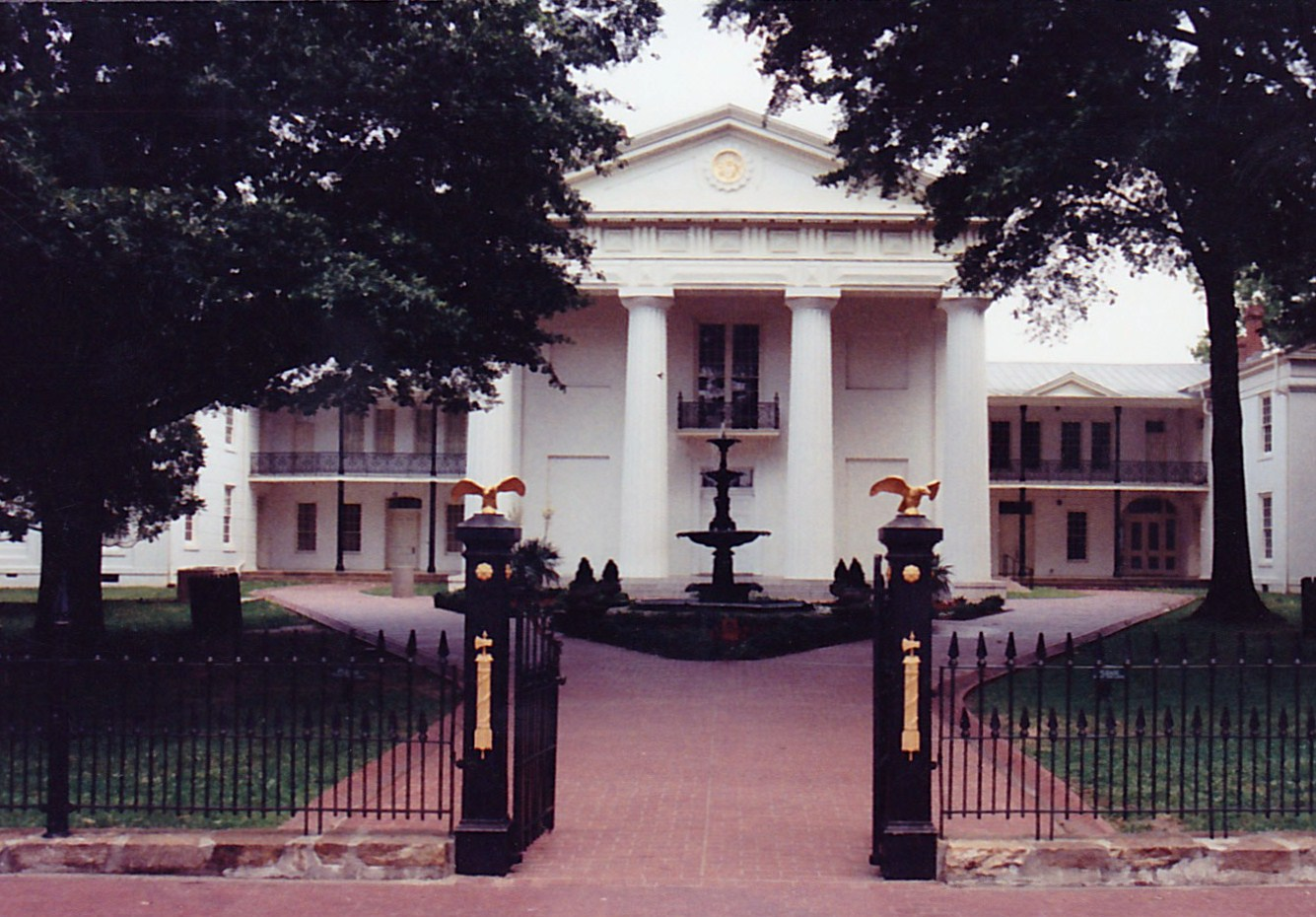
Old State House
Museum

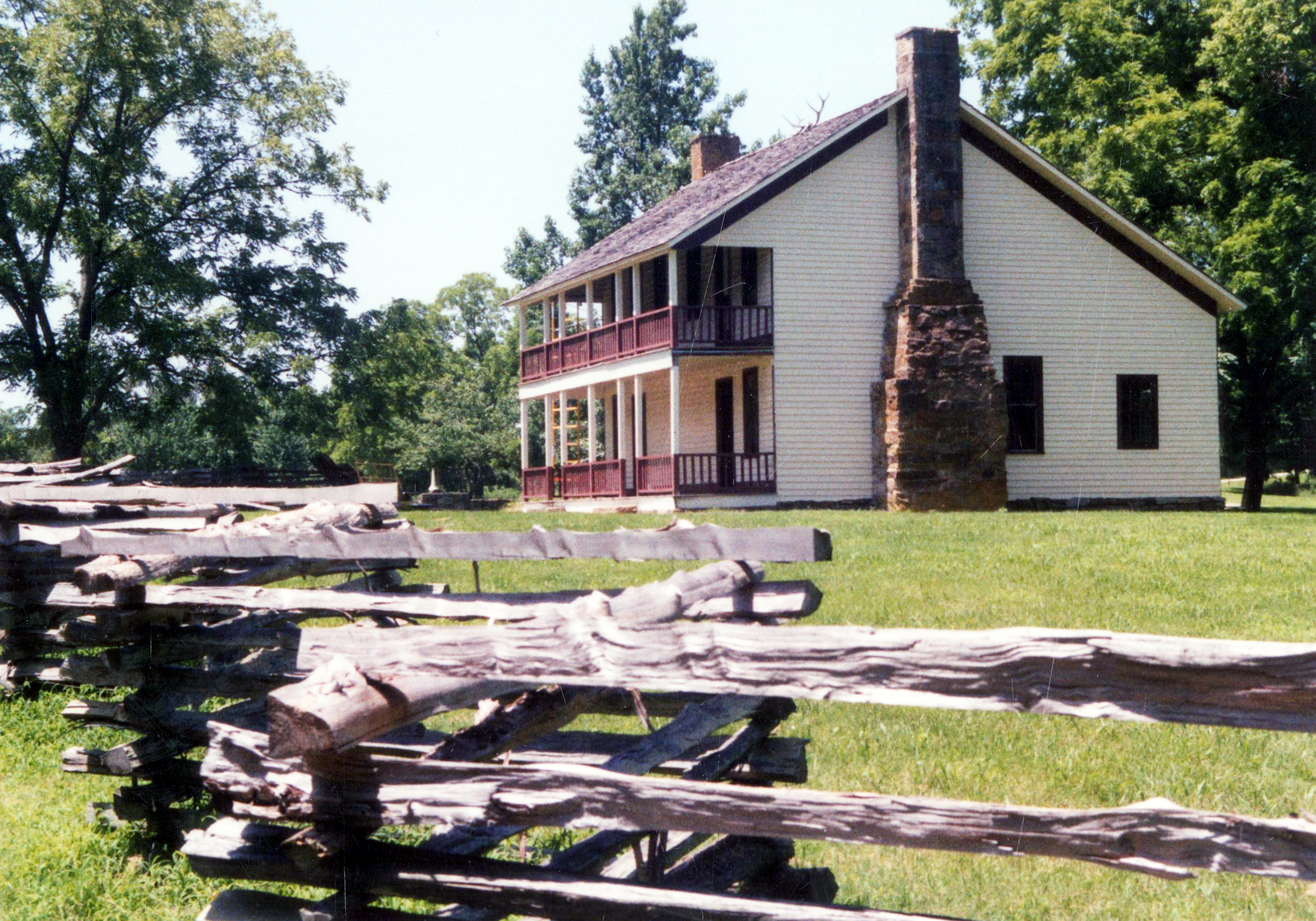
Pea Ridge
National Military Park

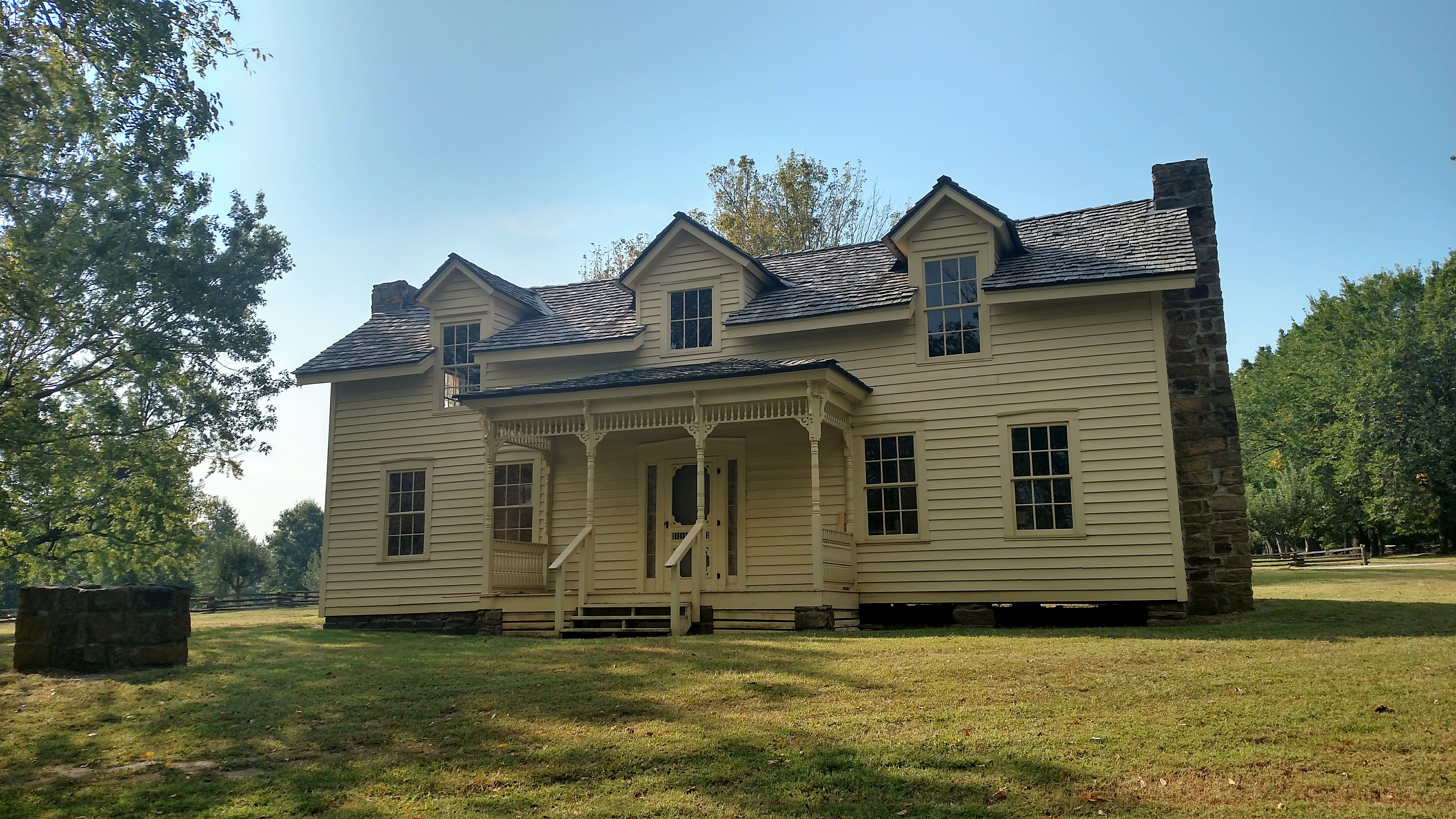
Prairie Grove Battlefield
State Park

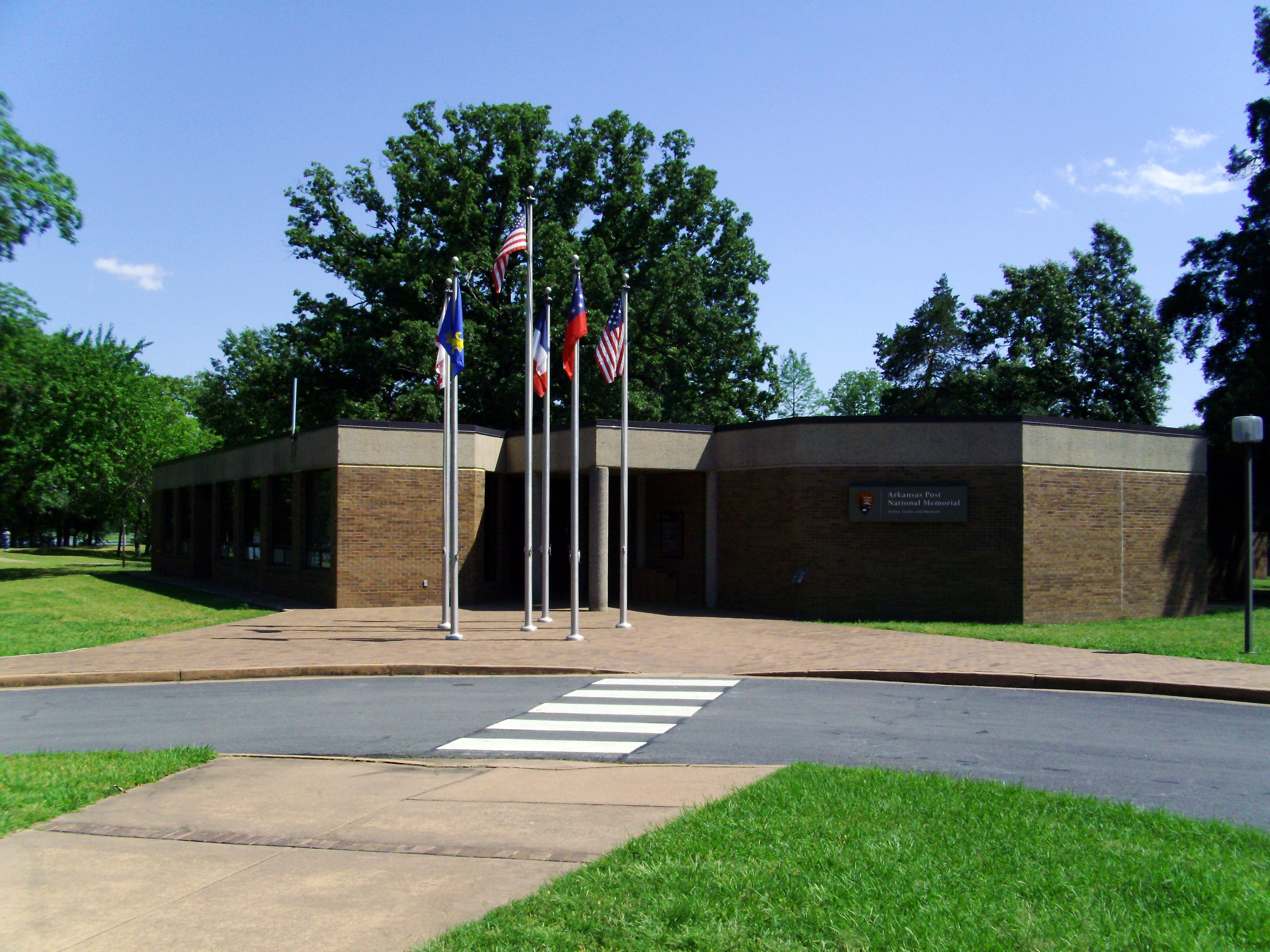
Arkansas Post
National Memorial

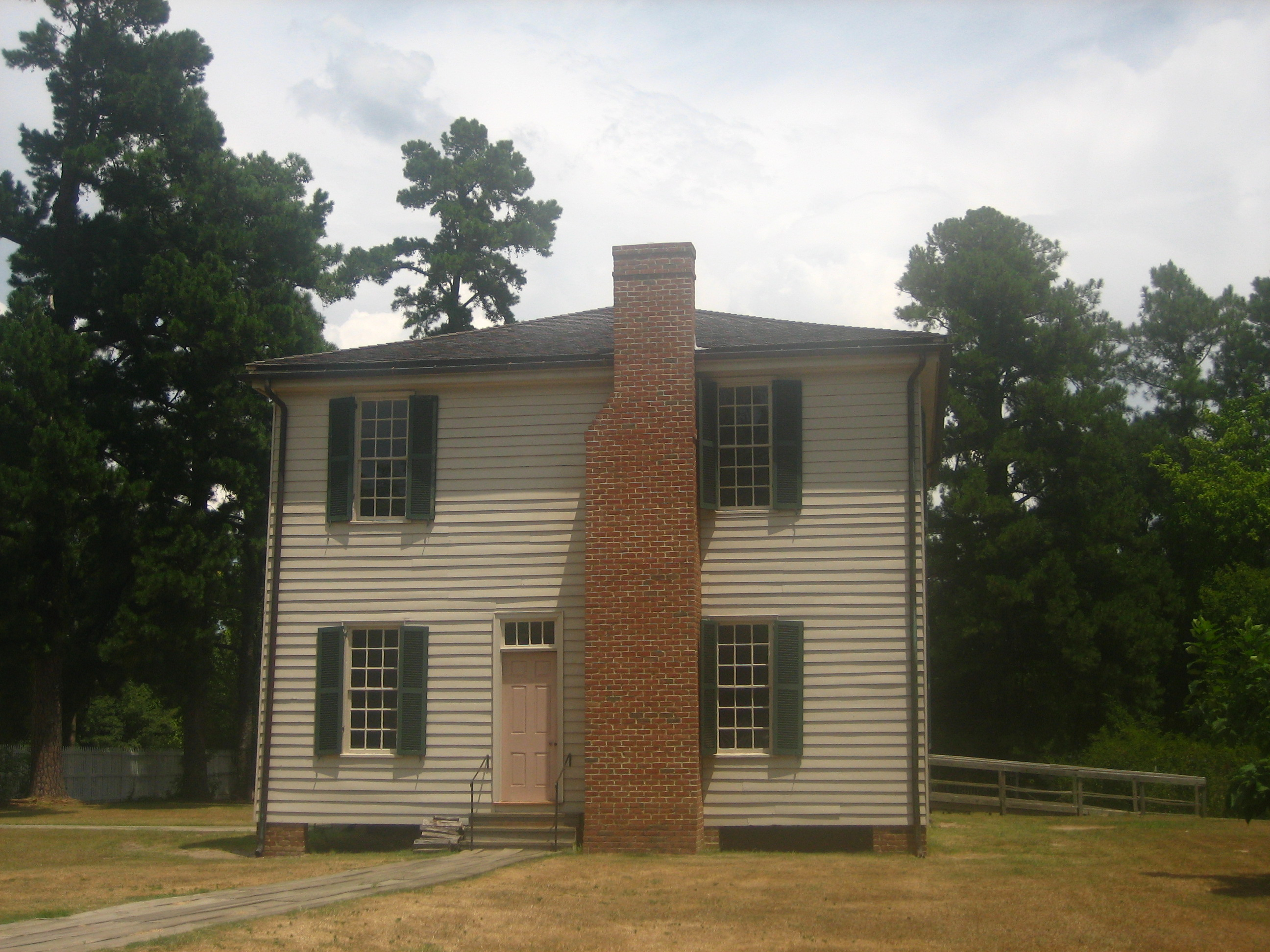
Historic Washington
State Park

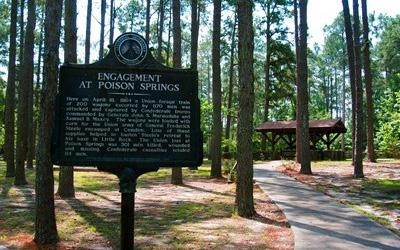
Poison Springs Battleground
State Park

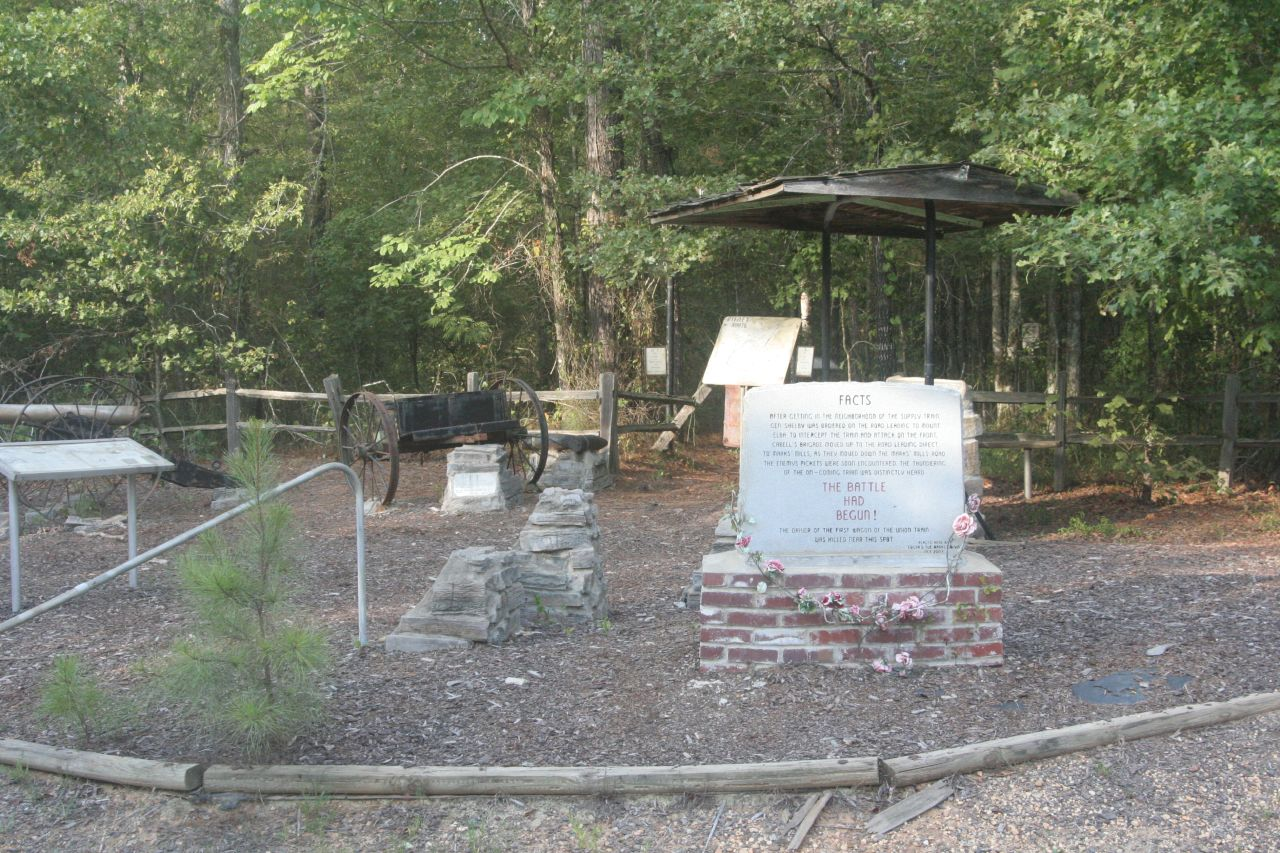
Marks' Mills Battleground
State Park

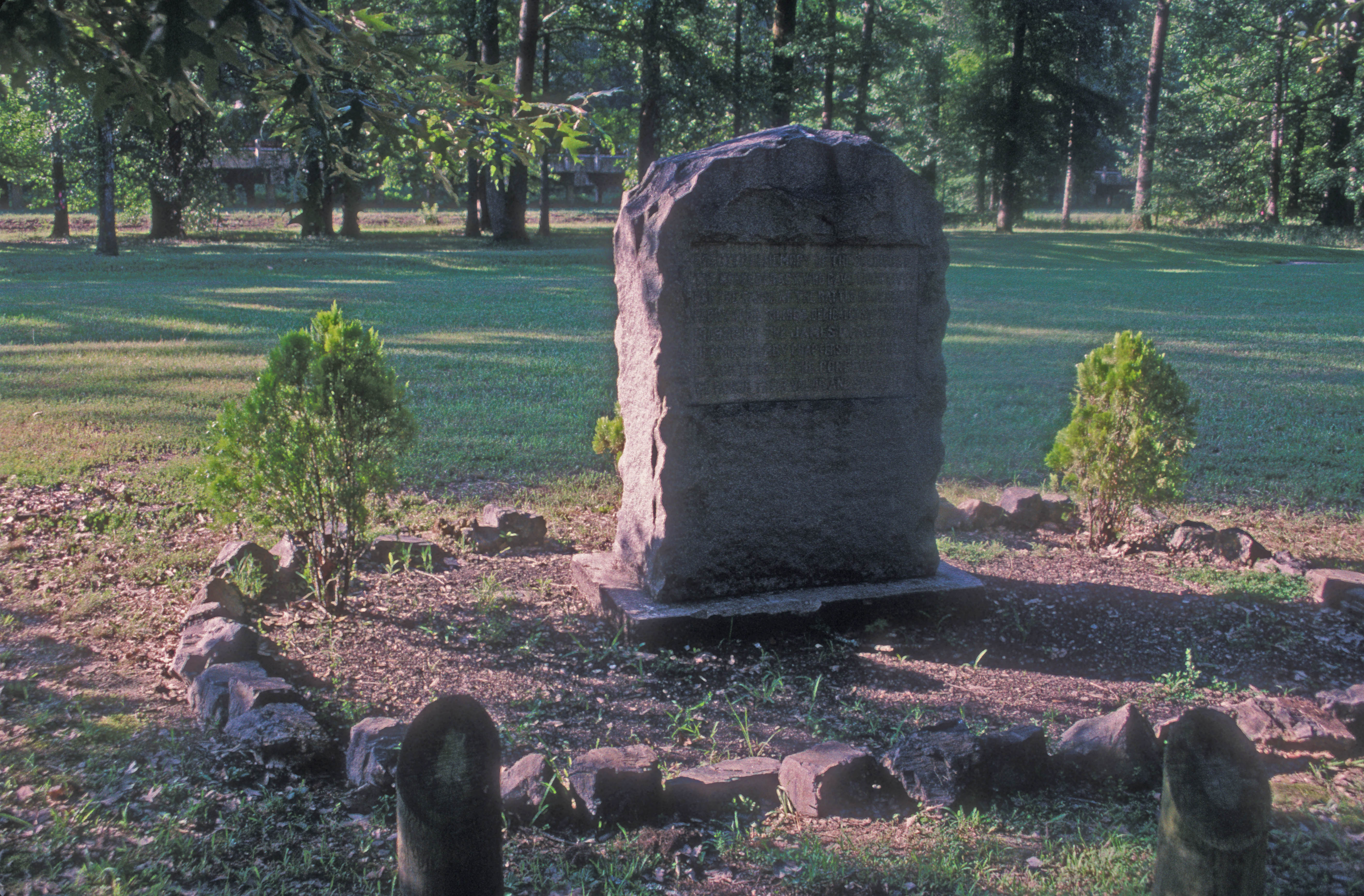
Jenkins' Ferry Battleground
State Park

== See also ==
- Arkansas Civil War Confederate Units
- Arkansas Militia in the Civil War
- Confederate States of America - animated map of state secession and confederacy
- History of slavery in Arkansas
- List of Arkansas Union Civil War Units

Preceded by Virginia	List of C.S. states by date of admission to the Confederacy; Admitted on May 18, 1861 (9th)	Succeeded by North Carolina
