= History of slavery in Montana =

The history of slavery in Montana is generally seen as short and limited. The issue was contentious for the legislature between the creation of the Nebraska Territory (which Montana was a part of) in 1854 and the outbreak of the American Civil War in 1861. However, there was apparently a particular acceptance of African Americans in the Nebraska Territory when they first arrived en masse. According to a publication by the Federal Writers' Project,

In the Territory of Nebraska the fight to exclude slavery from within the territorial boundaries spread from the Senate to the press and to the pulpit. Even among the slaves in the South the word spread that here was a place where the attitude toward Negroes was tempered with tolerance.

== Early history ==
York, an enslaved African American held by William Clark, traveled and worked with him in 1804 and 1806 as part of the famous Lewis and Clark Expedition's exploration of the Missouri River lands. He was the first black person recorded in what would become Montana. A number of Montana's geographical features were named after York by the expedition, including the Yorks Islands in Broadwater County, Montana, and the "York's Dry Creek", a tributary of the Yellowstone River, in Custer County, Montana.

In 1820, the United States Congress passed the Missouri Compromise. It prohibited slavery in the unorganized lands that would become the Nebraska Territory. The topic of slavery in Nebraska Territory would not be revisited by Congress until 1854.
