= History of slavery in Arkansas =

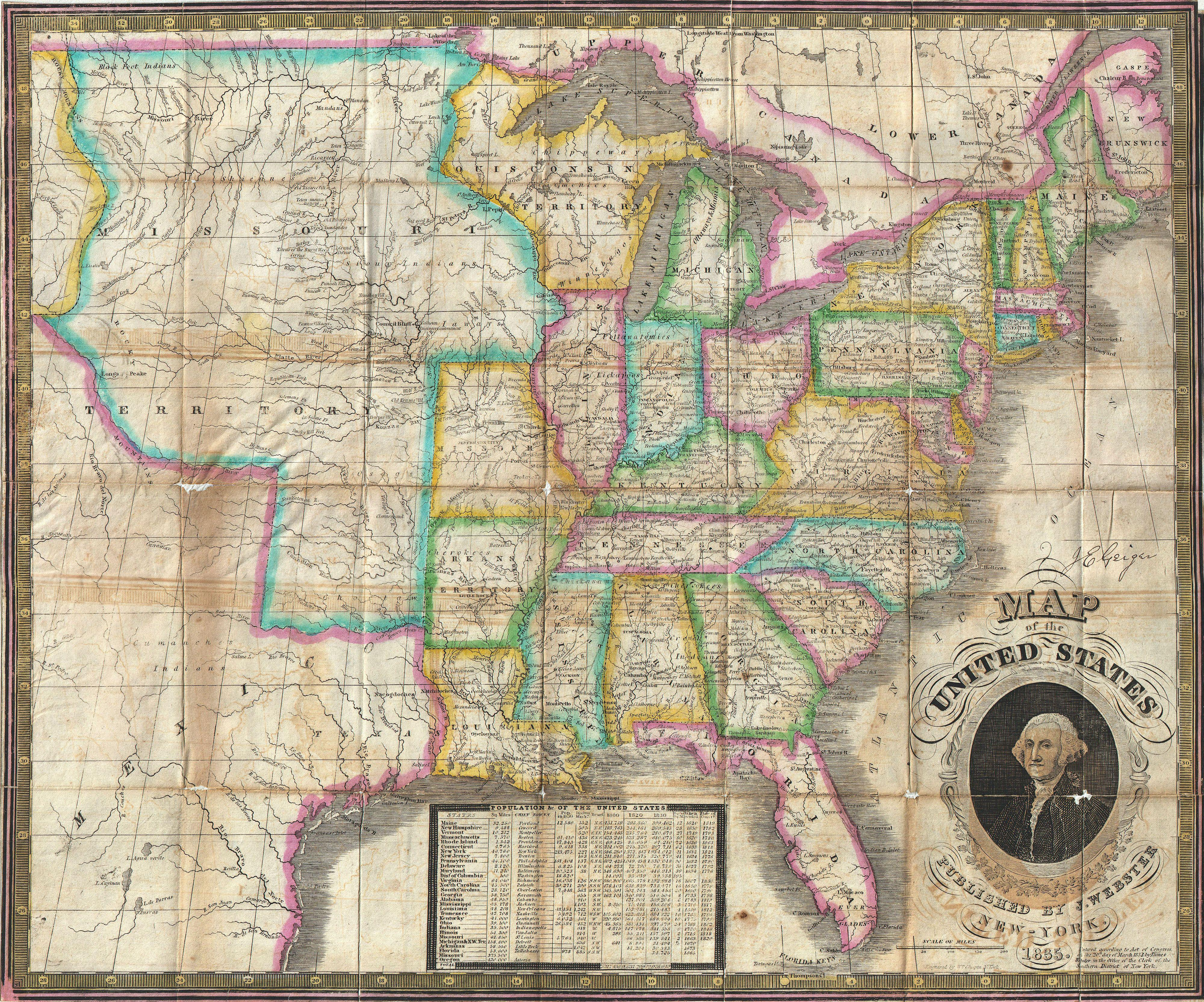
1835 map of the United States just prior to the admission of Arkansas in 1836 and its free state "twin," Michigan, in 1837

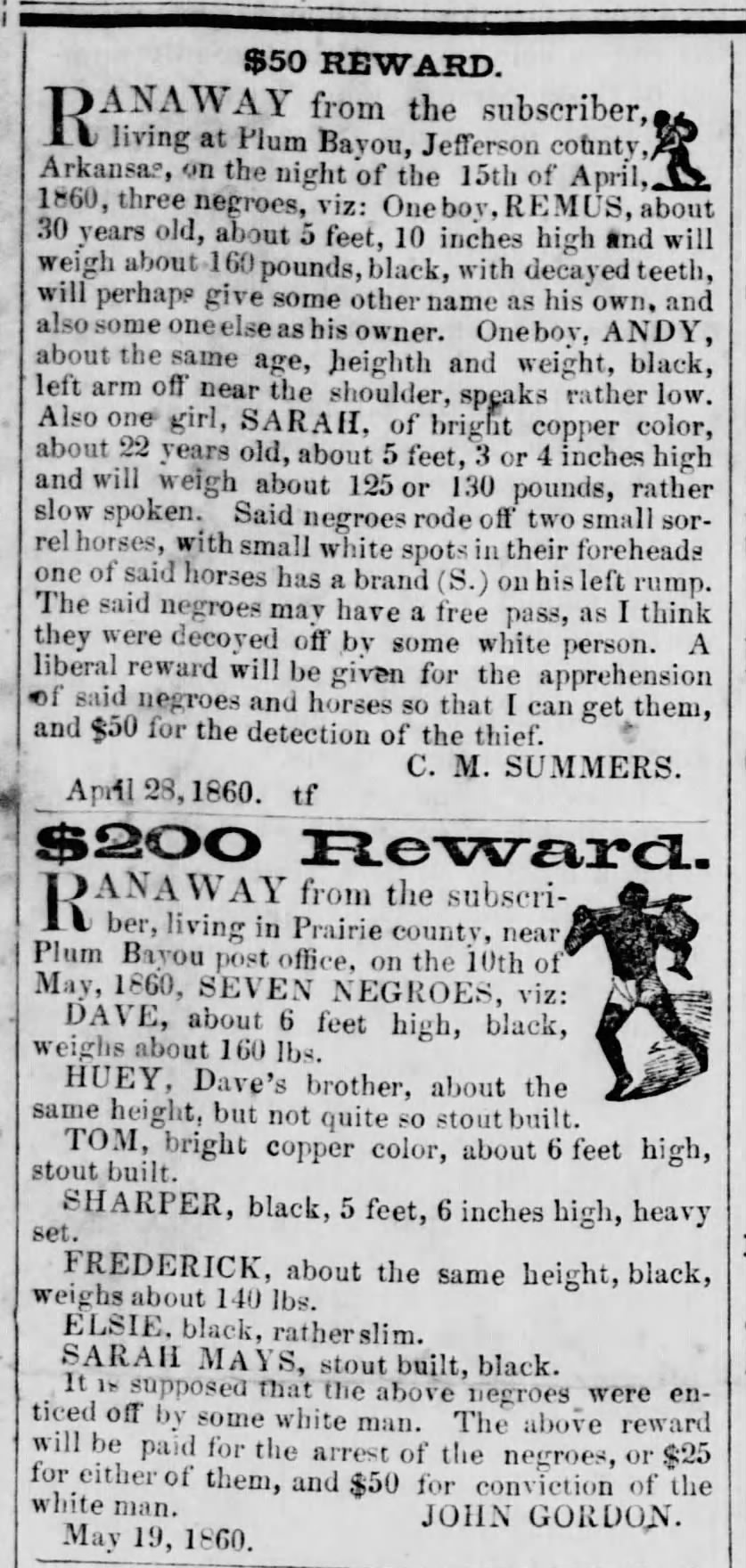
Runaway slave ads describing freedom seekers from Plum Bayou, Arkansas (True Democrat, Little Rock, Ark., May 26, 1860)

The history of slavery in Arkansas began in the 1790s, before the Louisiana Purchase made the land territory of the United States. Arkansas was a slave state from its establishment in 1836 until the Thirteenth Amendment of the U.S. Constitution was ratified in 1865. Slaveholders were initially clustered in the eastern and southern sections of Arkansas Territory closer to the Mississippi River Delta. Topography was more varied in the north and west, so there were fewer slaves in those sections. Enslaved people would live in rural or urban antebellum Arkansas. Development of Arkansas caused rapid growth in the slave population. In 1810, 188 of the total population were slaves, and by 1820 it had risen to 1,617. The number of enslaved people continued to grow through the territorial period and up to the Civil War. By 1830, the enslaved population reached 4,576, 19,935 by 1840, 47,100 by 1850 and 111,115 by 1860. As the enslaved population grew, it constituted a larger and larger portion of the total population, growing from 11% in 1820 to 25% in 1860.

Arkansas was one of slave-importing states of the Deep South; according to the Natchez Courier, Arkansas, Louisiana, Mississippi and Alabama imported "more than 250,000 slaves from the border slave states" in 1836. According to the Arkansas Historical Quarterly in 1944, "Most of the slaves in Arkansas were used for the cultivation of cotton, which was the major product of the state. All the counties that had more slaves than whites were cotton-producing counties." The cotton calendar was plowing in February, planting April and May, hoeing in June, avoiding the Arkansas Delta heat and humidity while the cotton grew in July and August, picking in September, and ginning in October. According to Historian Orville Taylor, roughly 1 in 4 white people owned slaves and many more benefited from slavery as leasing slaves was not an uncommon practice.

Under early Arkansas law, "Slaves could testify for and against free negroes or mulattoes on trial for trespass or felony, but not against white persons." Blacks could legally own real and personal property they could not legally own black slaves. Slaveowners could be fined for making slaves work on Sundays. Enslaved people were a relatively small proportion of the population until 1840, but by 1860, slaves were owned by people in every county. Free people of color were driven out of the state by series of punitive laws beginning in 1843; by 1860 there were only 30 free people of color in Arkansas. Hiring out slave labor was widespread in Arkansas and provided significant household income to enslavers.

Every county had a slave patrol, and in 1859 a city paper in Little Rock bellyached "that the city's slave patrol was not up to controlling the blacks that 'traverse the streets at all hours of the night free from hindrance...'" (while carrying around knives and pistols no less.)

Arkansas had the second-lowest proportion of slaves any state in the Confederacy—only Tennessee had fewer slaves as a percentage of the overall population. There were 5,526 recruitments to the U.S. Colored Troops from Arkansas.

== History ==
Violence had always been a prevalent issue in the South. Violence worsened as the Ku Klux Klan spread through nearly every southern state as they targeted recently freed African Americans. Governor Powell Clayton arrested the members of this terrorist group by utilizing state militia which had things back in order by early 1869. To further prevent the issue, Governor Edmund J. Davis formed “a skilled police force that made 6,000 arrests between 1870 and 1872, effectively stopping Klan activities and protecting freedmen from violence.”

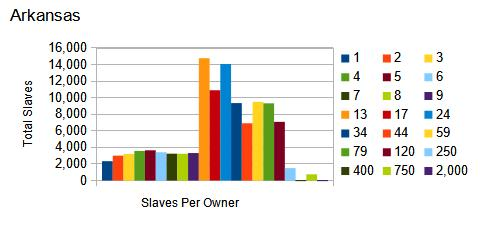
1860 US census, Arkansas, number of slaves per owner

== See also ==
- African Americans in Arkansas § Slavery
- Slavery in New France
- History of slavery in the United States by state
