= Thomas C. Hindman =

Confederate States Army general (1828–1868)

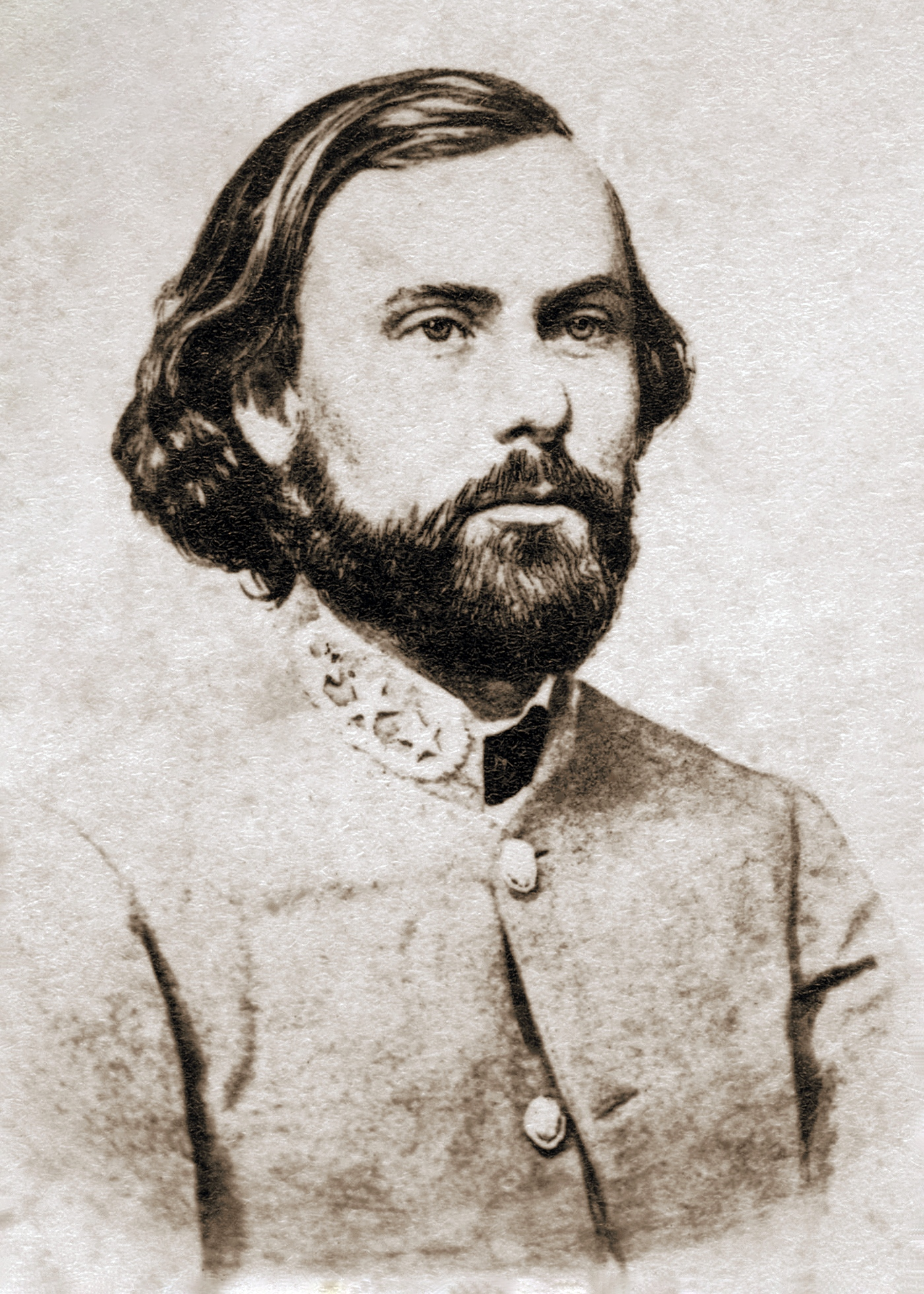
- Hindman in uniform, c. 1862

Member of the U.S. House of Representatives from Arkansas's 1st district
- In office March 4, 1859 – March 3, 1861
- Preceded by: Alfred B. Greenwood
- Succeeded by: Logan H. Roots

Personal details
- Born: Thomas Carmichael Hindman Jr. January 28, 1828 Knoxville, Tennessee, U.S.
- Died: September 28, 1868 (aged 40) Helena, Arkansas, U.S.
- Cause of death: Homicide (gunshot wound)
- Resting place: Maple Hill Cemetery
- Party: Democratic
- Spouse: Mary Watkins Biscoe (m. 1856)
- Children: 5

Military service
- Allegiance: United States; Confederate States
- Branch: United States Volunteers; Confederate States Army
- Years of service: 1846–1848 (U.S.); 1861–1865 (C.S.)
- Rank: Second Lieutenant (U.S.); Major General (C.S.)
- Commands: 2nd Arkansas Infantry Regiment; Trans-Mississippi Department; First Corps, Trans-Mississippi Army
- Battles: Mexican–American War; American Civil War; Battle of Shiloh (WIA); Battle of Prairie Grove; Battle of Chickamauga (WIA); Atlanta campaign (WIA)

Thomas Carmichael Hindman Jr. (January 28, 1828 – September 28, 1868) was an American lawyer, politician, and a senior officer of the Confederate States Army during the American Civil War. Born in Knoxville, Tennessee, he later moved to Mississippi and became involved in politics. He served in the Mexican–American War from 1846 to 1848. Hindman practiced law and in 1853 was elected to the Mississippi House of Representatives. After his term expired in 1854, he moved to Helena, Arkansas where there were more opportunities for his political ambitions. Hindman opposed the Know-Nothing party and Arkansas's ruling Conway-Johnson dynasty. He was elected to the United States House of Representatives in 1858, and supported slavery (and was a slaveholder himself) and secession. He was assassinated during the Reconstruction era.

Once the American Civil War began in 1861 and Arkansas seceded, Hindman joined the Confederate States Army, first commanding the 2nd Arkansas Infantry Regiment, then a brigade, and then an ad-hoc division at the Battle of Shiloh in April 1862; he was wounded during the battle. Following Shiloh, Hindman was promoted to major general and sent to the Trans-Mississippi Department to command Arkansas, Missouri, the Indian Territory, and part of Louisiana. As commander of the region, his policies were sometimes legally questionable and were unpopular, although they were successful in building up the district from a basically indefensible state. Public outcry led to Hindman's removal from his regional command. He was defeated at the Battle of Prairie Grove in December. Transferred to the Army of Tennessee in 1863, he led a division at the Battle of Chickamauga in September, where he was again wounded. After recovering, he commanded a division during the early stages of the Atlanta campaign although he wished to be transferred elsewhere.

During the retreat after the Battle of Kennesaw Mountain in the summer of 1864, Hindman suffered an eye injury. He was placed on leave and traveled to Texas with his family. When the Confederacy collapsed in 1865, he fled to Mexico, but returned to Helena in 1867. Resuming his involvement in politics, he opposed the Reconstruction Era government of Arkansas. Hindman was shot by an unknown assassin at his home late on September 27, 1868, and died the next morning. Before his death, Hindman suggested the shooting was politically motivated.

== Early life ==
Thomas Carmichael Hindman Jr. was born to Thomas C. Hindman Sr. and Sallie Holt Hindman on January 28, 1828. His parents were of English and Scottish descent, and his father had served in the 39th United States Infantry during the War of 1812. Family lore claimed that Thomas Sr. was the first white male born in Knoxville, Tennessee. Thomas Sr. and Sallie moved to Rhea County and then Post Oak Springs before returning to Knoxville, where Thomas Jr. was born, the fifth of six children.

The elder Hindman often traveled to Alabama for business, and moved his family to Jacksonville, Alabama, in 1841. Much of his business there involved the Cherokee people, whose trust he gained, eventually leading to his appointment as an Indian agent. His work involved a great deal of travel, including along the Trail of Tears as a quartermaster during the Cherokee removal. With his father often away and little education available in the Jacksonville area, Thomas Jr. was sent to New York to live with relatives. He eventually enrolled at the Lawrenceville Classical Institute in New Jersey. Coursework at Lawrenceville was focused on the grammars of English and classical Greek and Latin, as well as mathematics and history. There was also an emphasis on debate, oratory, and religious instruction. Hindman was probably hazed while attending the school.

Thomas Jr. graduated in 1843, as his class's salutatorian, receiving highest academic honors. After spending some time in New York, Hindman moved to Ripley, Mississippi, where his family had relocated while he was at school. His father had become prominent in local politics. In Mississippi, the younger Hindman farmed cotton and studied law with respected local attorney Orlando Davis. In 1846, the Mexican–American War began, and Hindman became caught up in the war sentiment, hoping to gain glory and believing that Mexico had wronged the United States.

== Mexican–American War ==
After President James Knox Polk called upon the states to furnish 50,000 volunteers for the war in 1846, Governor of Mississippi Albert G. Brown authorized the creation of a number of companies, expecting that the state would be asked to furnish multiple units. Instead, Mississippi was authorized to produce only one unit, the Mississippi Rifles, leading to many would-be volunteers, including Hindman, not having an opportunity for service. Later, in November, after other states did not meet their quotas for units, Mississippi was permitted a second infantry unit, which both Hindman and his older brother Robert joined. Thomas served as a second lieutenant in the unit, but Robert was eventually discharged for medical reasons.

Hindman's unit, the 2nd Mississippi, trained at Camp McClung near Vicksburg, Mississippi in January 1847, before being transferred to New Orleans, Louisiana. The unit moved to the mouth of the Rio Grande River in late February, then to other locations, including Saltillo and Buena Vista (after the Battle of Buena Vista). Aside from a few small raids, the unit did not see action and was wracked by disease. According to historian William L. Shea, Hindman served capably in his role as a junior officer in the regiment. His service included a time as a post adjutant at Mazafil from April 26 through May 1848.

== Return to Mississippi ==
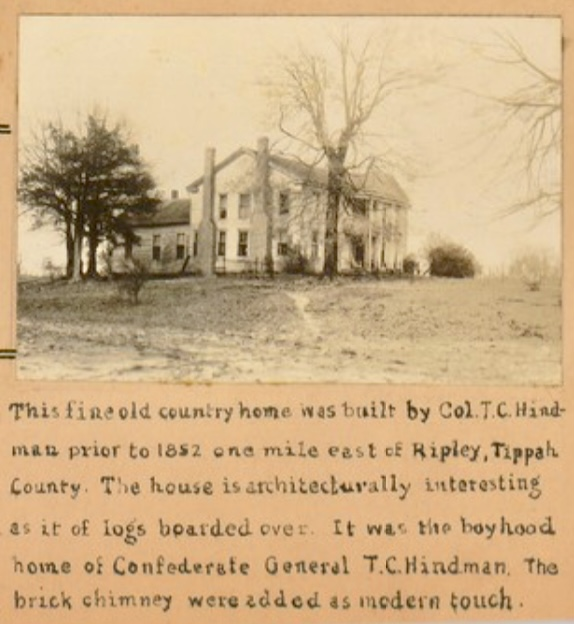
Hindman family home in Tippah County, Mississippi, from the WPA's Pictorial History: Mississippi in Architecture (1937)

Hindman's regiment returned to Mississippi later in 1848. In May 1849, Robert Hindman was killed by William Clark Falkner in a quarrel. Falkner had felt that Robert had attempted to block him from joining the Sons of Temperance brotherhood. In the quarrel, Robert pulled a gun which misfired, and Falkner stabbed him to death. He was acquitted, and then later killed a family friend of the Hindmans, again receiving an acquittal. The killings led to a gunfight between Thomas Jr. and Falkner that resulted in no injuries, and a duel was barely avoided.

Hindman joined the Sons of Temperance himself, becoming active in the early 1850s and serving as a "recording scribe" for the organization. After completing his studies with Orlando Davis, he was admitted to the bar in 1851, but found his calling in politics. A major political debate in Mississippi during the 1851 elections concerned whether slavery should be allowed in the territories won during the Mexican–American War. Hindman served as delegate to a county Democratic Party convention and the state convention of the faction of the party that supported the expansion of slavery. Hindman initially supported John A. Quitman in the 1851 gubernatorial election, but switched allegiance to Jefferson Davis after Quitman withdrew.

Davis and the pro-states' rights Democrats narrowly lost the 1851 election, but regained the governorship in 1853. That same year, Hindman was elected to a seat in the Mississippi House of Representatives from Tippah County. He was appointed to the judiciary committee and supported tax and education reform, reforms to the Mississippi Chancery Courts system, and the Fugitive Slave Act of 1850. He tried, with little success, to ensure that new railroads within the state complied with the requirements of their charters.

== Move to Arkansas ==
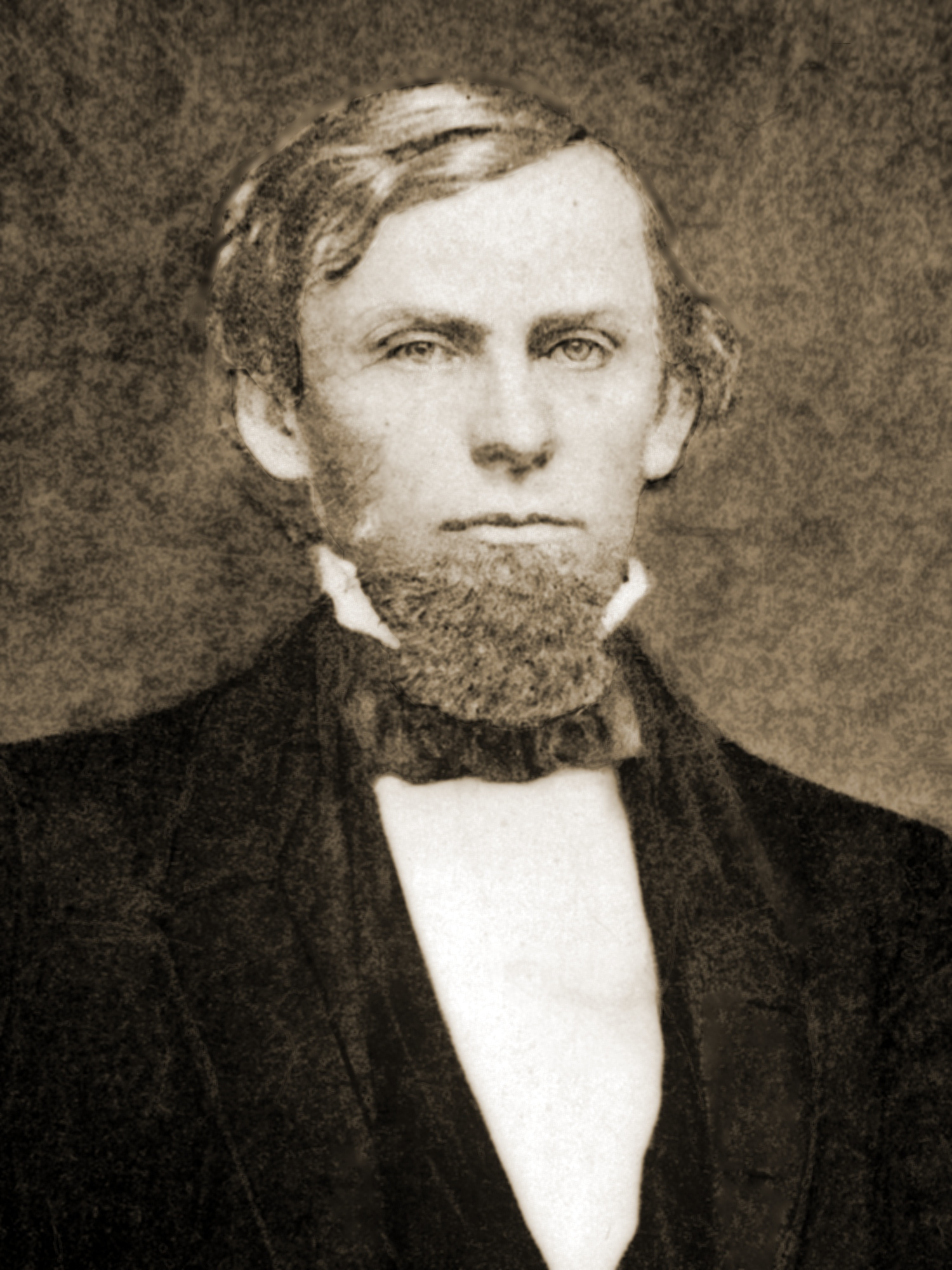
Official portrait, c. 1854

In March 1854, the term of the legislature ended, and Hindman decided that the political field of Mississippi was too crowded. Across the Mississippi River lay Arkansas, which was much less developed and provided more opportunities for his political ambitions. Moving in June and settling in Helena, Hindman soon entered Arkansas politics. He formed a law partnership with John Palmer and gained attention in a political debate with the cotton planter James L. Alcorn at a Fourth of July barbeque. Hindman had a reputation as a dandy, and on the day after his debate with Alcorn, a local Whig insulted Hindman by referring to him as "my sweet scented individual". The two agreed to duel with bowie knives, but the situation was defused by Patrick Cleburne and Gideon Pillow. During the 1854 political cycle, Hindman served as an orator focussing on railroad topics that would benefit Helena, although he did not run as a candidate.

During the summer of 1854, Hindman had been in contact with Quitman about a filibustering expedition to attempt to annex Cuba to the United States as a slave state. Hindman was unable to join the expedition. While lobbying for railroads in Little Rock in January 1855, he had been involved in an altercation with two men after he offended their friend, the newspaper editor Charles C. Danley. One, a Dr. Moon, pulled a pistol on Hindman, who was unarmed but expressed a willingness to fight at a later time when he had a weapon. The next day, inside the Arkansas House of Representatives building, Moon's associate Wilson pulled a pistol on Hindman, who shot Moon with a derringer pistol and then pulled another weapon on Wilson. Hindman was confronted by an angry mob and was later arrested. Released on bail, he returned to Helena and was eventually acquitted. The incident prevented him from going to Cuba as leaving the country would have made him appear to be a fugitive.

=== Opposing the Know-Nothings ===
During 1855, Hindman continued to provide support for temperance groups. In May 1855, he became even more active in Arkansas politics, opposing the Know-Nothings, a political faction that held strong anti-immigrant and anti-Catholic positions. Hindman opposed the Know-Nothings because they were for the most part against slavery, he disagreed with them on immigration, and he felt that they violated religious liberty. Hindman formed a Democratic Party association, supported by his law partner Palmer, who was a Catholic. He spent the rest of the year speaking against the Know-Nothings across northern Arkansas, culminating in a major rally at Helena in late November. Cleburne was one of his primary political lieutenants at this time. The two targeted the Know-Nothings for their perceived abolitionism. When a yellow fever epidemic struck Helena that fall, only Hindman, Cleburne, and a local minister volunteered to aid doctors as nurses. During the epidemic, Hindman and Cleburne became good friends; they bought a newspaper together and renamed it the States Rights Democrat.

At the outset of 1856, Hindman decided to run for Arkansas's 1st congressional district seat in the United States House of Representatives. He went on a speaking tour across northern Arkansas from late January to mid-March, stressing opposition to the Know-Nothings and abolitionism. Hindman was challenged for the Democratic Party's nomination by the popular incumbent Alfred B. Greenwood. The party held a nomination convention beginning on Monday, May 5. After 276 rounds of voting deadlocked between Hindman and Greenwood that stretched into Saturday morning, Hindman withdrew in the interest of party unity. Hindman actively campaigned for Greenwood, becoming in the words of biographers Diane Neal and Thomas Kremm "more visible during the canvass than Greenwood". These actions kept him in the public eye, and set him up to be a strong candidate for the 1858 election.

Hindman's vocal opposition to the Know-Nothings led to a feud with state legislator W. D. Rice. The situation festered from June 1855 through May 1856, when the two exchanged hostile letters in a newspaper. On May 24, Rice and three of his relatives got into a street fight with Hindman and Cleburne. The participants knew a fight was coming and all were armed. Rice fired first and hit Hindman in the arm and side. Hindman and Cleburne returned fire, and Cleburne was shot through the right lung. One of Rice's relatives died three days later from wounds suffered in the fight, and Cleburne almost died as well. Both Hindman and Cleburne were later legally acquitted for their actions during the fight. During 1856, Hindman had also began courting Mary Watkins Biscoe, at one point sneaking into a convent to see her when her father attempted to force an end to the romance. They were married on November 11, with Cleburne serving as Hindman's best man. Hindman's new father in-law was a wealthy landowner, and two of his bride's uncles had held statewide office. The marriage increased Hindman's financial position and social status.

=== Bringing down Arkansas's political "family" ===
Hindman began another run for Congress in late 1857. The Know-Nothings had been defeated soundly in the 1856 elections, and he had no major opposition within his own party. He was quite popular with Arkansas Democrats, and this time he easily won his party's nomination for the 1st congressional district. He then handily defeated William M. Crosby in the general election to win the seat. During the campaign, he was involved in a carriage accident that broke his leg. The injury did not heal properly, leaving one of his legs 2 inches (5.1 cm) longer than the other. He had to wear a special boot, and he walked with a limp the rest of his life.

For years, Arkansas politics had been run by the political Conway-Johnson dynasty known as the Family. By the late 1850s, the strength of the Family was waning, as one of their most successful tactics had been to stress Democratic unity in the face of the Whigs and Know-Nothings, both of whom had largely lost power in Arkansas after 1856. The Family had supported Hindman in his 1858 congressional run, but Hindman had further ambitions, desiring the United States Senate seat held by Family member William K. Sebastian. The Family backed Sebastian for re-election, and Hindman then took a leading role in organizing a Democratic faction, known as the Old Line Democrats, opposed to the Family. In 1859, he established a newspaper, the Old Line Democrat, in Little Rock. After a pro-Family political convention in November 1858 had changed traditional nominating rules to allow former Whigs and Know-Nothings to participate in the candidate selection process, Hindman protested publicly, believing that the changes had been made to secure Sebastian the nomination. In response, Richard H. Johnson and other leaders of the Family threatened to block Hindman's re-election push for the 1860 election. To the Family, Hindman was a "factious disorganizer". The historian Thomas A. DeBlack writes that Hindman's "oratorical and organizational skills were unmatched by any other politician in the state".

Major disagreements between Hindman and his camp and the Family occurred over fiscal matters. The Real Estate Bank of Arkansas, a state bank, had previously collapsed as a result of the Panic of 1837, leaving Arkansas with large amounts of debt. Hindman suggested reducing the debt by foreclosing on mortgages held by the bank and suing the bank's stockholders, many of whom were members of the Family, for the collateral they had put up. Johnson, in turn, accused Hindman of wanting to get the bank problem resolved because his father in-law was a former trustee of the bank who owed the bank money and had been accused of mismanagement. Hindman also accused the state government of unfairly awarding a printing contract to the Family-owned True Democrat newspaper, while the Family responded that Hindman just wanted the contract to go to one of the two newspapers he owned, the States Rights Democrat and the Old Line Democrat. Hindman unsuccessfully attempted to get Congressional election dates changed, and both sides accused the other of being supported by Know-Nothings. In November 1859, Hindman promised that he would appear in Little Rock to publicly argue against the Family, but instead went to Mississippi, stating that there had been an illness in his family. His failure to appear caused Robert Ward Johnson to refer to Hindman as "a bully and imposter". A duel between the two men almost occurred in December. Another scandal arose when the press of the Family accused Hindman of writing a number of pro-Hindman letters under the name of "Viator"; Hindman later admitted to having been involved in writing them.

Hindman's rise to prominence had caused turmoil in Arkansas politics, and the state Democratic Party was now badly split. In the candidate selection convention for the 1860 Arkansas gubernatorial election, the Family leadership manipulated several electoral and delegate selection processes to ensure Richard Johnson's nomination. In May 1860, Henry M. Rector, a lower-ranking member of the Family hierarchy, entered the race. Rector opposed Johnson, but did not directly ally with Hindman and his supporters, although Hindman did support Rector. In the congressional elections, Hindman won the Democratic nomination with little difficulty, although his opponents accused him of exerting undue influence over the commission and argued that he should have instead been at the Congressional session in Washington, D.C. After a bitter gubernatorial campaign that was defined more by personalities than issues, Rector defeated Johnson; Hindman handily defeated his opponent, Jesse N. Cypert. Talk of secession had played a role in the campaign: Johnson was viewed as a pro-secession candidate, anti-secessionist voters favored Rector. The 1860 elections marked the end of the strength of the Family in Arkansas politics, and it never regained its former position of dominance.

== American Civil War ==
=== Secession ===
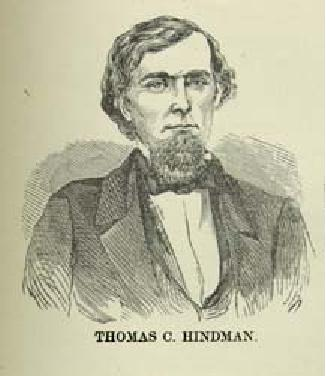
A portrait of Hindman, taken from Loreta Janeta Velazquez's The Woman in Battle: A Narrative of the Exploits, Adventures, and Travels of Madame Loreta Janeta Velazquez, Otherwise Known as Lieutenant Harry T. Buford, Confederate States Army

Throughout his political career, Hindman had supported slavery, the right of slaveholders to take their slaves to other territories, and the belief that the Union could only be preserved if slavery was allowed. He also supported the resumption of the international slave trade, which had been outlawed in the United States. In the election for Speaker of the United States House of Representatives in 1859, Hindman joined other southern Democrats in opposing the candidacy of Republican John Sherman. Sherman had signed a compendium accompanying an anti-slavery book by Hinton Rowan Helper, and in January 1860, Hindman made a speech titled "That Black Republican Bible – The Helper Book" in opposition to Sherman. Hindman's speech was popular in the south, and Republican William Pennington was elected instead of Sherman.

In Congress, Hindman supported a canal to bypass a blockage on the Red River of the South; proposed a decrease in public land cost; supported a railroad from Memphis, Tennessee to Albuquerque, New Mexico; and proposed converting the Little Rock Arsenal into an educational facility. Hindman was not a delegate to the 1860 Charleston Democratic National Convention, where a major split in the Democratic Party occurred. The split was bad enough that another convention had to be held in Baltimore. There was disagreement over who would be in the Arkansas delegation to the Baltimore convention; a threatened duel between Hindman and Dr. William Hooper did not proceed when Hindman declined as he did not consider Hooper to be his equal. The Baltimore convention completed the split of the Democratic Party. Some of the party supported Stephen A. Douglas, while others supported John C. Breckinridge. Hindman supported Breckenridge, who was viewed as the stronger pro-slavery candidate. While Breckenridge carried Arkansas, Republican Abraham Lincoln won the election nationwide. Hindman viewed the election of Lincoln as meaning that slavery was no longer safe, and supported secession while knowing that it could lead to civil war. With the political situation volatile, Hindman and Edward W. Gantt made speeches to the Arkansas General Assembly that DeBlack refers to as inflammatory.

On December 20, 1860, South Carolina seceded. The next day, Hindman and Robert Ward Johnson sent a telegram to the Arkansas General Assembly calling for a secession convention. By the end of January 1861, Mississippi, Alabama, Florida, Georgia, and Louisiana were out of the Union. Arkansas took control of the Little Rock Arsenal in early February, and on February 18, the voters of Arkansas approved a secession convention. The secession convention met in early March and was against secession in the early going, and on March 18 rejected two motions that would have created a statewide secession referendum. However, before the convention ended on March 21, an agreement was made to hold a secession referendum in August.

The situation changed in mid-April. On April 12, Confederate forces fired on Fort Sumter, bringing on the American Civil War, and Lincoln called on the states to furnish troops to put down the rebellion. Arkansas rejected the request, and the secession convention was recalled. Lincoln's call for troops moved public opinion towards secession, and parts of the state began to prepare for war even though the state had not yet seceded. Hindman made pro-secession speeches in the areas that had previously opposed it, and he was present on May 6 when the convention voted to secede from the Union. He personally telegraphed Davis, who was now the Confederate president, with the result. With war coming, Hindman resigned his seat in the United States House of Representatives.

=== Entering Confederate service ===
Hindman desired to be a member of the Arkansas delegation to the Confederate States Congress but was rejected for the role; the political powers in Arkansas wanted to prevent radical forces from taking over. After seceding, the secession convention created several laws to prepare the state for military action. Hindman was not part of the convention, but did write most of an ordinance for it to establish a military board. After contacting the Confederate States Secretary of War, LeRoy Pope Walker, Hindman received permission to recruit a regiment for Confederate service. Hindman informed the military board of this development on May 23, but they would not provide weapons, food, or clothing for his men. Instead, Hindman had to keep the men he recruited at Helena and Pine Bluff at his own expense. The men were initially ordered to Richmond, Virginia, but on June 11 were given orders to remain in Arkansas because Union Army forces in Missouri were threatening Arkansas. Hindman's unit became the 2nd Arkansas Infantry Regiment, and he entered the Confederate States Army as a colonel on June 12. Hindman's men were assigned to the command of Confederate Brigadier General William J. Hardee, but other Arkansas troops remained in state service and would not serve under Hardee, especially since they were not being properly paid or clothed. Many simply went back home.

In September, General Albert Sidney Johnston was placed in command of all Confederate forces west of the Allegheny Mountains, excluding the coast of the Gulf of Mexico. Hardee's force, including Hindman's regiment, was transferred to Kentucky later that month, but Hindman was on recruiting duties and did not immediately follow it. He was promoted to brigadier general on September 28, and after arriving in Kentucky, he was assigned to command one of two brigades in a division led by Hardee, with Cleburne, who was also in Confederate service, commanding the other. While in Kentucky, Hindman's men fought in several minor actions, including the Battle of Rowlett's Station on December 17.

=== Shiloh ===
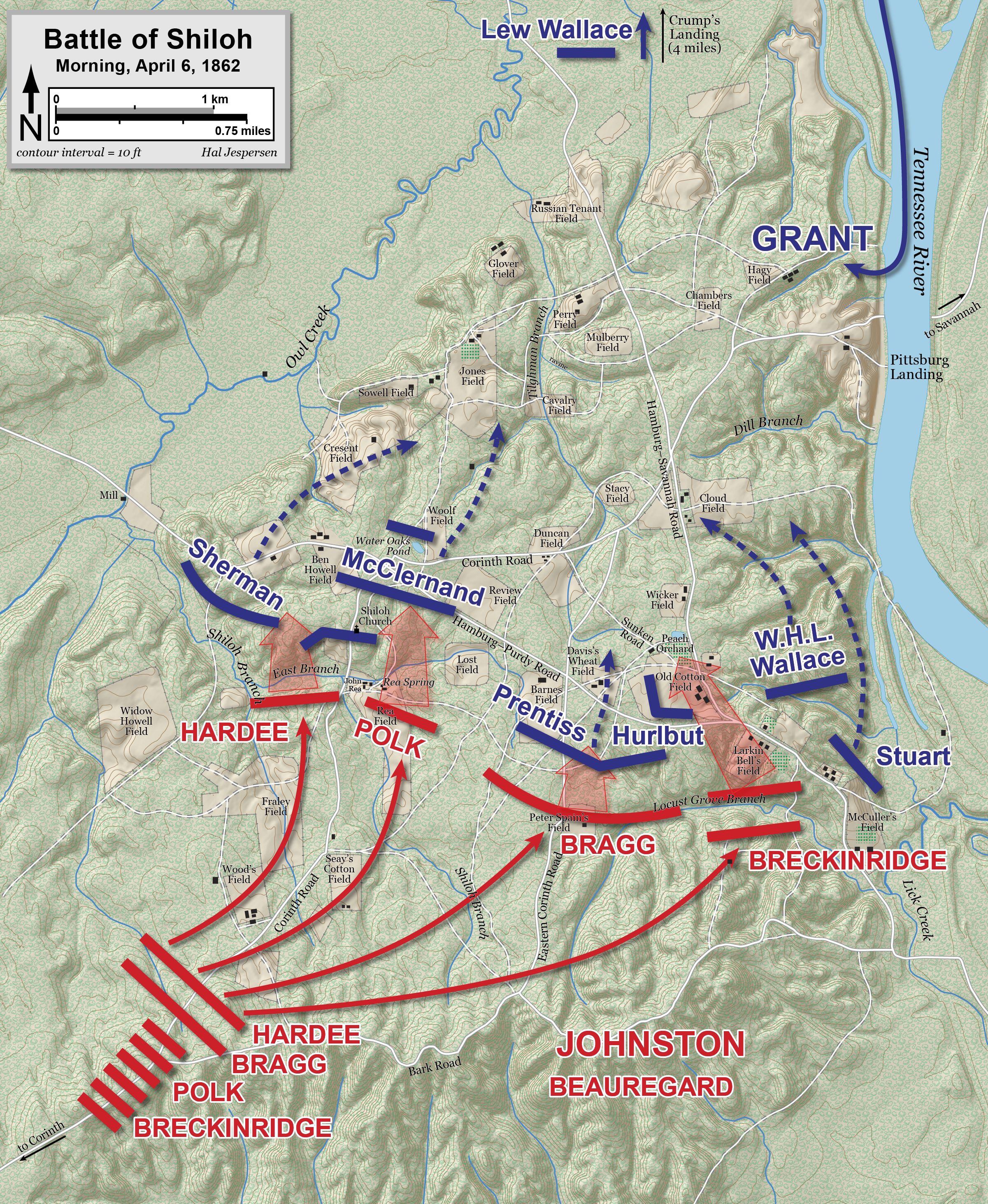
Confederate attacks in the opening stages of the Battle of Shiloh

On February 8, 1862, after a Union victory at the Battle of Fort Henry and with the fall of Fort Donelson likely, Johnston ordered the abandonment of Kentucky, and Hindman's men withdrew to Corinth, Mississippi, via Murfreesboro, Tennessee. At Corinth, Johnston gathered forces and by April had over 40,000 men, and along with General P. G. T. Beauregard, began planning an attack against Major General Ulysses S. Grant's Union army at Pittsburg Landing, Tennessee. Hindman was in command of a brigade in a corps led by Hardee. Johnston's attack, known as the Battle of Shiloh, was launched on April 6.

Shortly before the battle, Hardee reorganized his corps into two ad hoc divisions, and Hindman's included both his original brigade (now commanded by Colonel Robert G. Shaver) and that of Brigadier General S. A. M. Wood. The battle opened with Hindman's men fighting with Colonel Everett Peabody's Union brigade, in an exchange that prevented the Confederates from achieving complete surprise. Wood's brigade later drove back a Union brigade, but suffered heavy losses in the effort. Hindman personally led another attack that shattered a Union brigade. During fighting with Colonel James C. Veatch's Union brigade, Hindman's horse was killed, and he was knocked out of the fighting by the fall, having broken a leg. With Hindman down and Hardee elsewhere on the field, Wood's and Shaver's battered and exhausted brigades fell out of the fighting, leaderless. Johnston was mortally wounded during the fighting on April 6, which resulted in the Union forces being pushed back but not decisively defeated. Union reinforcements arrived, and on the next day drove the Confederates from the field. Hindman received praise from both Hardee and Beauregard for his performance during the battle.

=== Trans-Mississippi command ===
After Shiloh, Hindman took leave in Helena to recover. He was promoted to the rank of major general to date from April 14 and reported back to the army at Corinth, Mississippi, on May 10. On May 26, Hindman received orders from Beauregard to head back west of the Mississippi River and take command of Arkansas and the Indian Territory; these orders were expanded the next day to command Arkansas, Missouri, the Indian Territory, and Louisiana north of the Red River of the South. After stopping to gather supplies and weapons in Memphis, Helena, and Napoleon, Arkansas, Hindman arrived in Little Rock on May 30. Major General Earl Van Dorn had recently transferred almost all of the men and supplies in the Trans-Mississippi Department to east of the Mississippi, leaving very little in Arkansas.

Hindman had to construct his department from little, in one of the least developed parts of the Confederacy. He approached his task with zeal and energy, enforcing conscription laws (he illegally exempted from conscription the manufacturers of some goods he deemed necessary), promoted guerrilla warfare, and declared martial law. He also took troops passing through the state for Trans-Mississippi use, ordered all white troops in the Indian Territory to report to Arkansas, set up facilities to produce supplies and weapons, and secured the return of a division of Missouri troops that had been sent east of the Mississippi. He also reorganized the cavalry units within his department. Historian Stephen B. Oates credited Hindman's actions with making the cavalry under his authority "useful instead of ornamental". In the long run, his support of guerrilla warfare backfired on Hindman, as it eventually led to an increase in lawlessness in the state. Some captured Union soldiers were tortured and murdered, and Shea suggested that Hindman's open hatred of the Union may have been to blame.

Hindman established defensive positions on the White River, although Union forces defeated Confederates in the area in the Battle of St. Charles and then again in the Battle of Cotton Plant, eventually taking Helena. Helena was the only permanent loss of territory in Arkansas the Confederates suffered at that time. After capturing Helena, Curtis had Hindman's slaves freed and occupied his house. As Union control of Missouri prevented Hindman from enforcing conscription there, he sent veterans of the Missouri State Guard into the state on recruiting drives, resulting in thousands of recruits for the Confederacy. The incursions also resulted in an uptick in guerrilla activity in Missouri. When Hindman had taken over in Arkansas, the region was largely defenseless and Union forces were on the move; 70 days later, Union forces were at a standstill and the Confederates had over 20,000 men in Arkansas and the Indian Territory.

Hindman's methods in accomplishing these tasks were sometimes extralegal, and he angered the political elite of Arkansas. Planters objected when Hindman ordered cotton burned to prevent Union forces from capturing it, or when he impressed slaves for military construction projects. Conscription was unpopular, and in the words of historians William Garrett Piston and John C. Rutherford, Hindman "managed to alienate almost everyone". Many Arkansans viewed him as a tyrant. Historian William Shea wrote that Hindman's accomplishments demonstrated "what fanaticism and a complete disregard for constitutional rights could accomplish". He also cooperated poorly with Brigadier General Albert Pike, who disagreed with the decision to transfer Pike's white troops from the Indian Territory; Hindman supported another officer who ordered Pike's arrest and wanted Pike brought up for a court martial based on a speech that Pike made to pro-Confederate Native Americans that Hindman thought was designed to discourage them. Arkansas elites complained about Hindman to the Confederate government, and Hindman was replaced, as it was believed that he had become odious to Arkansans. His successor was Major General Theophilus Holmes, who was appointed on July 16. Holmes arrived in Arkansas on August 12.

=== Defeat at Prairie Grove ===
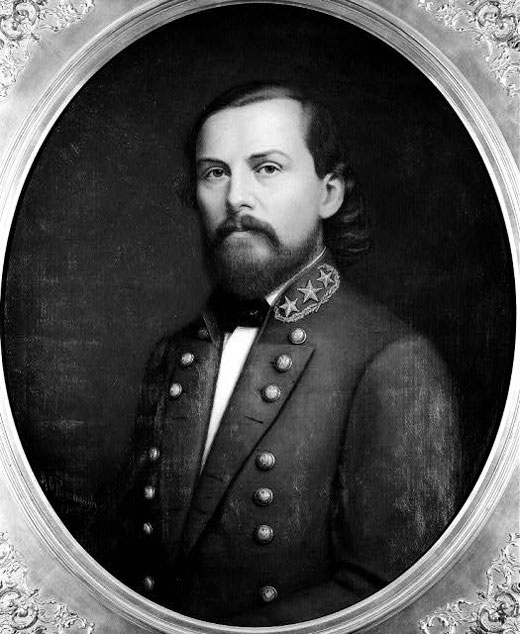
Portrait of Hindman by Aurelius O. Revenaugh, 1906

Holmes, who had been transferred west after performing poorly in the Seven Days' Battles, upheld some of Hindman's unpopular decrees, including martial law. Holmes divided his department into three districts: Hindman was appointed to command the District of Arkansas, which consisted of Arkansas, Missouri, and the Indian Territory. Both Holmes and Hindman wanted to invade Missouri, and Hindman was ordered on August 21 to travel to Fort Smith in northwestern Arkansas to prepare for such a movement. Hindman arrived three days later; the Confederate troops in the area were largely unprepared for an offensive, and only a few months remained until the onset of winter would make movements in the Ozarks very difficult. In early September, Hindman pushed 6,000 men into southwestern Missouri and established his headquarters at Pineville. On September 10, Holmes recalled him to Little Rock. Brigadier General Allison Nelson had fallen terminally ill, and Holmes needed Hindman to take care of administrative matters.

In Hindman's absence, Brigadier General James S. Rains took command. The Confederates in southwestern Missouri withdrew back into Arkansas after the First Battle of Newtonia, splitting into two forces, one of which was shattered at the Battle of Old Fort Wayne. Hindman returned to Fort Smith in mid-October, and had Rains removed for drunkenness. After learning that Union Major General John Schofield had advanced into Arkansas with 8,000 to 10,000 men, Hindman withdrew his force south across the Boston Mountains. After the withdrawal, Schofield assumed that the Confederates were no longer threatening Missouri and took two of his three divisions back to Springfield, Missouri, leaving Brigadier General James G. Blunt's division in northwestern Arkansas.

The Confederates had been defeated at the Second Battle of Corinth, and Holmes was ordered to transfer 10,000 men east of the Mississippi River. Hindman opposed this, and suggested an offensive movement, which Holmes reluctantly agreed to. Hindman's plan was to send Brigadier General John S. Marmaduke's cavalry to Cane Hill, Arkansas, to distract Blunt, while moving most of his force into Blunt's rear, crushing Blunt before Union reinforcements could arrive from the Springfield area. Marmaduke's movement was detected by Union scouts, and Blunt moved to attack the Confederate cavalry. Fighting broke out between the two forces on November 28, and Marmaduke was forced to withdraw. Despite being short on food and ammunition, Hindman then moved most of his force, a total of 11,000 men and 22 cannons, towards Cane Hill on December 3. Blunt learned of the movement and prepared for a fight.

Late on December 6, Hindman learned that Union forces, led by Brigadier General Francis J. Herron, had already left Springfield and would be at Cane Hill on December 7. As his previous plan was no longer feasible, Hindman decided to instead strike Herron at Prairie Grove on December 7 and then attack Blunt at Cane Hill after defeating Herron. The new plan was risky, and was predicated on Blunt not moving to reinforce Herron at Prairie Grove. Hindman did not attack, and instead took up a passive defensive position at Prairie Grove on December 7. The Battle of Prairie Grove opened between Hindman and Herron, but Blunt arrived on the field at 13:45. The Confederates fought the combined forces of Herron and Blunt to a draw, but Hindman decided to withdraw to Van Buren, Arkansas, after the battle. Biographers Diane Neal and Thomas Kremm wrote that Hindman's decision to move to the defensive on December 7 was a "ghastly mistake"; Hindman's contemporary John Newman Edwards stated that "waiting for Herron's attack meant waiting for Blunt". The Confederates retreated again, this time to Little Rock, after a defeat by Herron and Blunt at the Battle of Van Buren on December 28.

=== Chickamauga ===
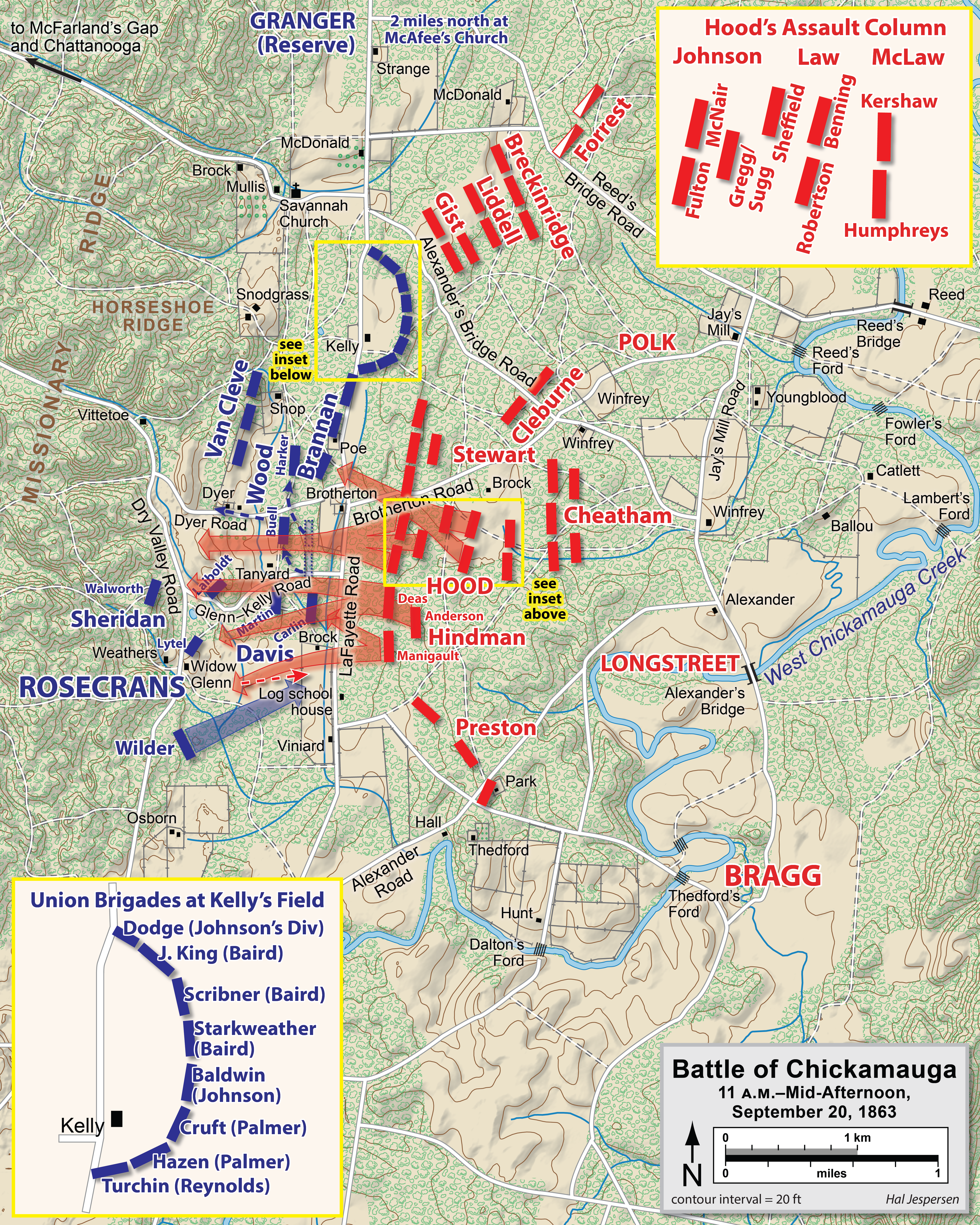
Confederate breakthrough on September 20

Hindman's earlier policies in Arkansas continued to make him unpopular during the Prairie Grove campaign, and the defeat at Prairie Grove worsened matters. The Arkansas congressional delegation petitioned Davis to transfer him out of the state, a request that was granted on January 30, 1863. Hindman was assigned to a court of inquiry related to the Confederate defeat at the Battle of New Orleans in February, and finally left the state on March 13. Hindman presided over the court of inquiry, which met from April through July. He petitioned the Confederate government to reassign him to a divisional command in Arkansas, but he was instead sent to command a division in Lieutenant General Leonidas Polk's corps of the Army of Tennessee. He arrived in Chattanooga, Tennessee, to join the army on August 13, but soon developed a poor relationship with army commander General Braxton Bragg.

On August 16, Union Major General William S. Rosecrans began a movement towards Chattanooga with 67,000 men. Outnumbered, Bragg abandoned the city and fell back into northern Georgia, pursued by Rosecrans. However, Rosecrans overextended his line, and Bragg prepared for an opportunity to attack. A division of the Union army was sent into McLemore Cove, in an area vulnerable to Confederate attack. On the night of September 9–10, Bragg ordered Hindman to attack, and ordered D. H. Hill to send Cleburne's division to attack from the opposite direction once Hindman struck the Union force. Hill, in turn, claimed to Bragg that the movement was impossible, and Cleburne's division moved only part of the way. Hindman's division likewise halted early, with Hindman sending a message back to Bragg that he would not advance further unless he learned for certain that Cleburne was moving as well. Hindman continued his movement towards the Union position on the morning of the 11th. At about noon, Bragg ordered Cleburne to attack but soon reversed the order. Minor skirmishing broke out between Hindman and the Union force at around 16:30, and Cleburne's division attacked, but the Union force had retreated and the Battle of Dug Gap was only light skirmishing. While Bragg's orders were poorly written, Hindman still performed badly; in the opinion of historian Craig Symonds, Hindman deserved the public tongue-lashing given to him by Bragg after the affair.

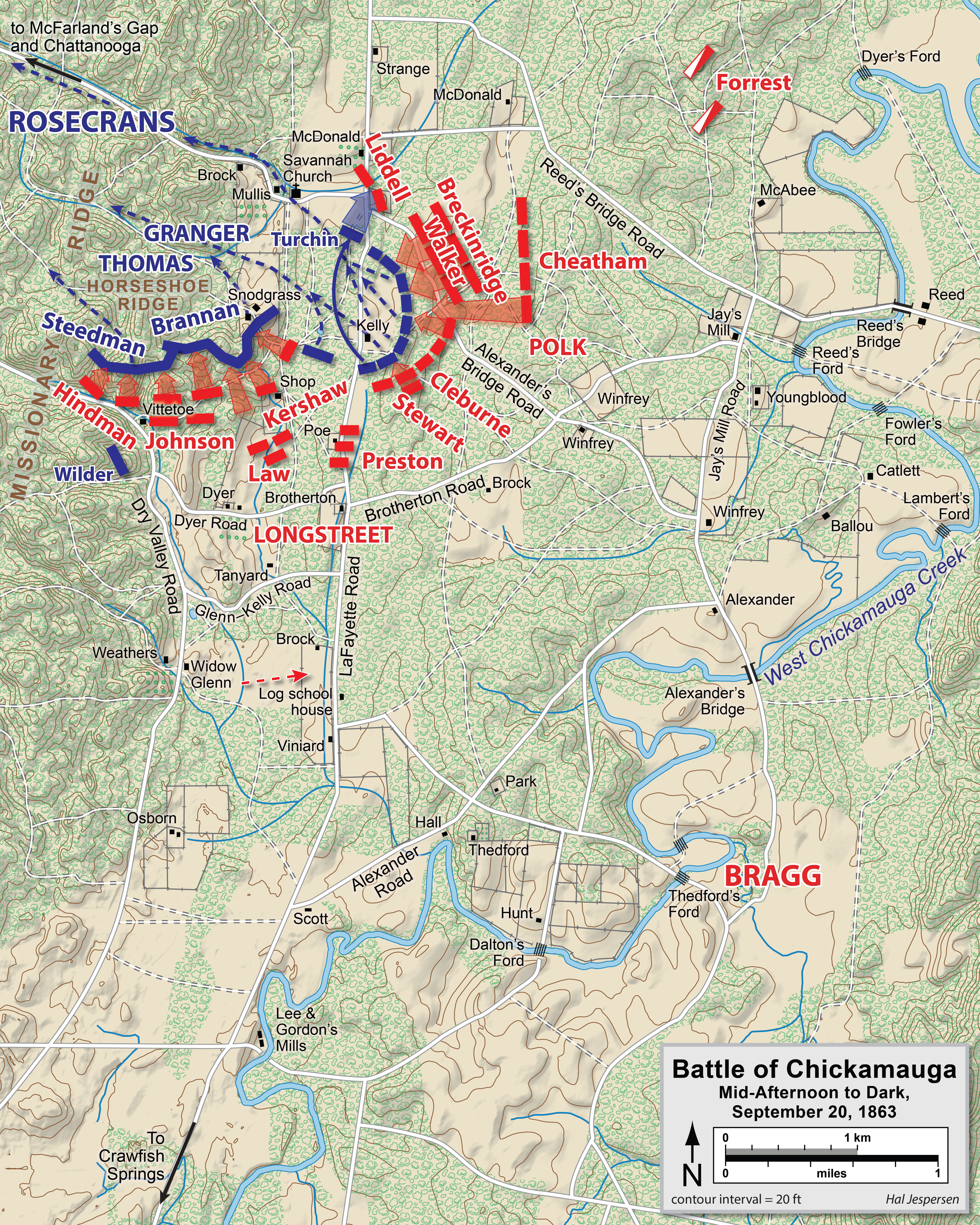
Confederate attacks against Thomas, September 20

Bragg then decided to attack Rosecrans elsewhere, at Lee and Gordon Mill. The Battle of Chickamauga began on September 18, with the main Confederate attack beginning on September 19. In the battle, Hindman's division was assigned to the left wing of the Confederate army, under the command of Lieutenant General James Longstreet. The battle continued into the next day, and a misunderstanding led to a Union division being moved from its place in the line on the morning of September 20, resulting in a gap between Union formations. Longstreet's men attacked into the gap. Hindman's division shattered two Union divisions in forty minutes. The entire Union right wing collapsed. Hindman suffered a painful shrapnel wound to the neck during the battle, but remained on the field. During the early afternoon, Colonel John T. Wilder's Union brigade struck Hindman's left flank, blunting the division's attack. Wilder wanted to drive through Hindman's line to the other side of the Union position, where troops under Major General George H. Thomas were still holding out, but was ordered to retreat. After this incident, Hindman was ordered to stop his pursuit of retreating Union forces and move his division north to rejoin other units of Longstreet's command.

Hindman sent one of his brigades to the support of Brigadier General Bushrod Johnson's division, ordered a second to resupply using captured Union ammunition, and intended to send his third brigade to Johnson's aid once it was ready. Instead, Johnson attacked without waiting for Hindman. Bloody fighting against Thomas's men occurred, and Hindman's division entered the fray as well. Longstreet had been unclear as to whether Johnson or Hindman were in charge, and both officers believed that they were responsible for both divisions. Fighting, often at close quarters, continued until nightfall, when Thomas, now facing the wings of both Longstreet and Polk, withdrew. Bragg decided not to pursue on September 21.

=== Suspension and transfer request ===
On September 29, 1863, Bragg suspended Polk from command for "neglect of duty" and Hindman for "disobedience of the lawful command of his superior officer", with Hindman's charge being related to the McLemore Cove incident. Hindman was sent to Atlanta, Georgia, to await further developments. Neal and Kremm refer to the suspension as unwarranted and ill-timed and state that the suspensions of Polk and Hindman "in part appear to have been motivated by Bragg's desire to rid his command of some of his critics", although Hindman had not vocally opposed Bragg. After recovering, Hindman began preparing reports and documents to oppose his suspension, and on November 8 asked for a court of inquiry. Several of the officers of Bragg's army had sent a petition to Davis in early October, and Davis, who had received letters from civilians criticizing Bragg's generalship, declared that the suspensions of Hindman and Polk were void and traveled to visit Bragg's army, although Bragg did not initially comply with the declaration. On November 15, wanting to avoid a court of inquiry, Bragg dropped the charges against Hindman and ordered him reinstated, although Hindman was allowed to remain on leave until December 15 while his wife gave birth and recovered from a serious illness. Meanwhile, Bragg had been removed from command on November 30; he was replaced by General Joseph E. Johnston on December 27. During the reorganization of the army, Hindman temporarily commanded a corps until Major General John Bell Hood arrived to take permanent command; Hood arrived on February 25.

Over the winter of 1863 to 1864, Hindman began supporting the Confederacy arming slaves, a highly controversial option. Cleburne made a public presentation in support of the idea, but it was rejected. Not wanting to serve under Hood, Hindman requested a transfer to an inspector general or behind-the-lines duty in Florida or southern Georgia before he was replaced. With the transfer not having been acted on by February 28, Hindman tendered his resignation. He had no real intentions of resigning, but hoped that it would push the Confederate government into transferring him. Instead, he was ordered back to his divisional command on March 18. His hopes of a transfer or promotion had been blunted by his support for Cleburne's proposal to arm slaves, the hostile Bragg's position as an advisor to Davis, and his continuing unpopularity in the Trans-Mississippi due to his previous actions in Arkansas. His resignation was denied on March 23, and Hindman officially resumed commanding his division on April 3.

=== Atlanta ===
In early May 1864, Union Major General William T. Sherman began the Atlanta campaign by moving almost 100,000 men against Johnston's army in northern Georgia. The Confederates withdrew from Dalton, Georgia, and took up positions at Resaca. The Battle of Resaca began on May 13. Fighting continued into the next day, and Hindman's division was attacked. After repulsing the Union infantry charge, Hindman's force came under artillery bombardment. Other Confederate troops attacked the Union left, only to be blunted by Union reinforcements. The battle continued into its third day on May 15. Union cavalry raided the Confederate rear, striking Hindman's division's field hospital, destroying supplies and taking prisoners. Around 13:00, Union troops again attacked Hindman's line, but were repulsed. Johnston learned that Union troops were threatening his line of communications, and ordered a withdrawal that night.

The Confederate retreat continued with sporadic fighting, with Johnston taking up a new position in the Marietta area in June. On June 22, elements of two Union corps pushed forward and encountered Hood's division near Kolb's Farm. Hood responded by ordering an attack. The Battle of Kolb's Farm was a bloody Confederate repulse. Along with Major General Carter L. Stevenson's division, Hindman's division was ordered to charge. Stevenson's division suffered heavy losses, while Hindman's men encountered a swamp in their line of attack and were driven off. One Union infantry officer claimed that Hindman's attack was repulsed solely by artillery fire, with his infantry being unengaged. On June 27, Sherman was bloodily repulsed in frontal attacks at the Battle of Kennesaw Mountain, and then outflanked Johnston's line, forcing the Confederates to retreat. During the withdrawal from Kennesaw Mountain, Hindman was struck in the face by a tree branch while riding through a forest. He was thrown from his horse and injured, including developing severe eye inflammation. The eye injury prevented him from exercising field command, and Hindman went to Atlanta and then Macon to recover.

=== Leave in Texas and end of war ===
On July 10, 1864, Hindman again requested a transfer, this time specifically to the Trans-Mississippi. This was denied because of his unpopularity in Arkansas, and he was instead offered a leave of absence to recover from his injury. Historian Albert E. Castel suggested that Hindman went on leave less because of his injury and more out of resentment of not being promoted. Another Confederate officer noted that Hindman was "anxious to get away, and everyone else equally so to get rid of him". Hindman selected San Antonio, Texas as the location for his leave, as he expected to be out of action for several months. He was unable to take all of his family's slaves with them, and hired some out to the medical director of the Army of Tennessee. In order to support his family in Texas, Hindman purchased tobacco in Alabama using borrowed money and then had it shipped using Confederate military wagons to Texas with him, where he intended to sell it. Leaving with his family in late August, Hindman began the trek to Texas. One of his daughters died of illness near Meridian, Mississippi, and was buried along the way. In early November, the party crossed the Mississippi River with difficulty, as Union forces now controlled it. They arrived in Shreveport, Louisiana, where Hindman was criticized for using Confederate military wagons to transport his personal belongings and tobacco, although it was common practice for Confederate government wagons to haul materials for civilians when they were not needed for military use. The issue became a scandal, and Major General John B. Magruder called for the arrest of those involved, although Hindman was never legally charged with any wrongdoing. He was instead ordered to pay for the cost of the transportation and forage for the animals pulling the wagons.

The Hindmans reached San Antonio in January 1865. By this time, the Confederacy was collapsing, and Atlanta had fallen. Over the next several months, false rumors about Hindman were circulating, such as that General E. Kirby Smith had ordered his arrest over the tobacco, or that Hindman had deserted the Confederacy to fight for Emperor Maximilian I of Mexico. In April, the armies of General Robert E. Lee and Johnston surrendered, and Smith surrendered to Union forces on June 2. Hindman, who was under indictment for treason from Union authorities in Arkansas, refused to surrender. Along with his family and other Confederates, Hindman left Texas in June and crossed the Rio Grande at Laredo, Texas, entering Mexico. The Hindmans settled in Monterrey.

== Later life ==
While he expected to have been able to easily make a living in Mexico, Hindman had trouble getting a law practice to flourish, despite learning Spanish. Maximilian later ordered the ex-Confederates to leave Monterrey, as he feared that if they flourished too much on the northern frontier of the country, they would eventually demand independence. The Hindmans moved to Saltillo and then Montelise. They then traveled to Mexico City in September, where Hindman hoped to discuss with Maximilian the topic of obtaining land for the ex-Confederates. The Hindmans became friends with Maximilian and his wife Carlota of Mexico. Hindman's fifth child was born in Mexico City in December, and Hindman published two works on military theory. The family later moved to the Carlota, where many ex-Confederates settled.

In Carlota, agriculture did not do as well as hoped, and Hindman was unable to establish a successful legal practice because of the poverty of the residents. Hindman was part of a plan formed by several ex-Confederates in 1866 to establish a colony in the Yucatán Peninsula, but this failed as foreign support for the rule of Maximilian ended. The family moved to Orizaba before June; rebels against Maximilian razed Carlota not long after they moved. Maximilian's rule began to collapse, and the Hindmans were forced to return to the United States, returning to Helena in April 1867. Maximilian was overthrown and executed in mid-June. Hindman requested a pardon from President of the United States Andrew Johnson, but this was denied. Once settled in Helena, Hindman resumed his legal practice with John C. Palmer and later M. T. Sanders.

Hindman also re-entered politics, speaking against the Radical Republicans. Hindman also argued against the 1868 Arkansas Constitution and the gubernatorial candidacy of Republican Powell Clayton. In an attempt to silence Hindman, the Republican leadership of Reconstruction Era-Arkansas revived the 1865 treason indictment and had Hindman arrested on March 20, 1868. He was permitted to remain at liberty until his trial, but the pending charges excluded him from a July 1868 amnesty proclamation by President Johnson that pardoned almost all former Confederates. He then became the leader of a political faction known as the Young Democracy, which supported taking a loyalty oath mandated by the 1868 constitution and then participating in future elections. One of the claims of the Young Democracy was that Republicans were only using Reconstruction for personal gain, and that freed slaves should instead support the Democrats. Hindman began to accrue a following of both ex-Confederates and freed slaves.

== Assassination ==
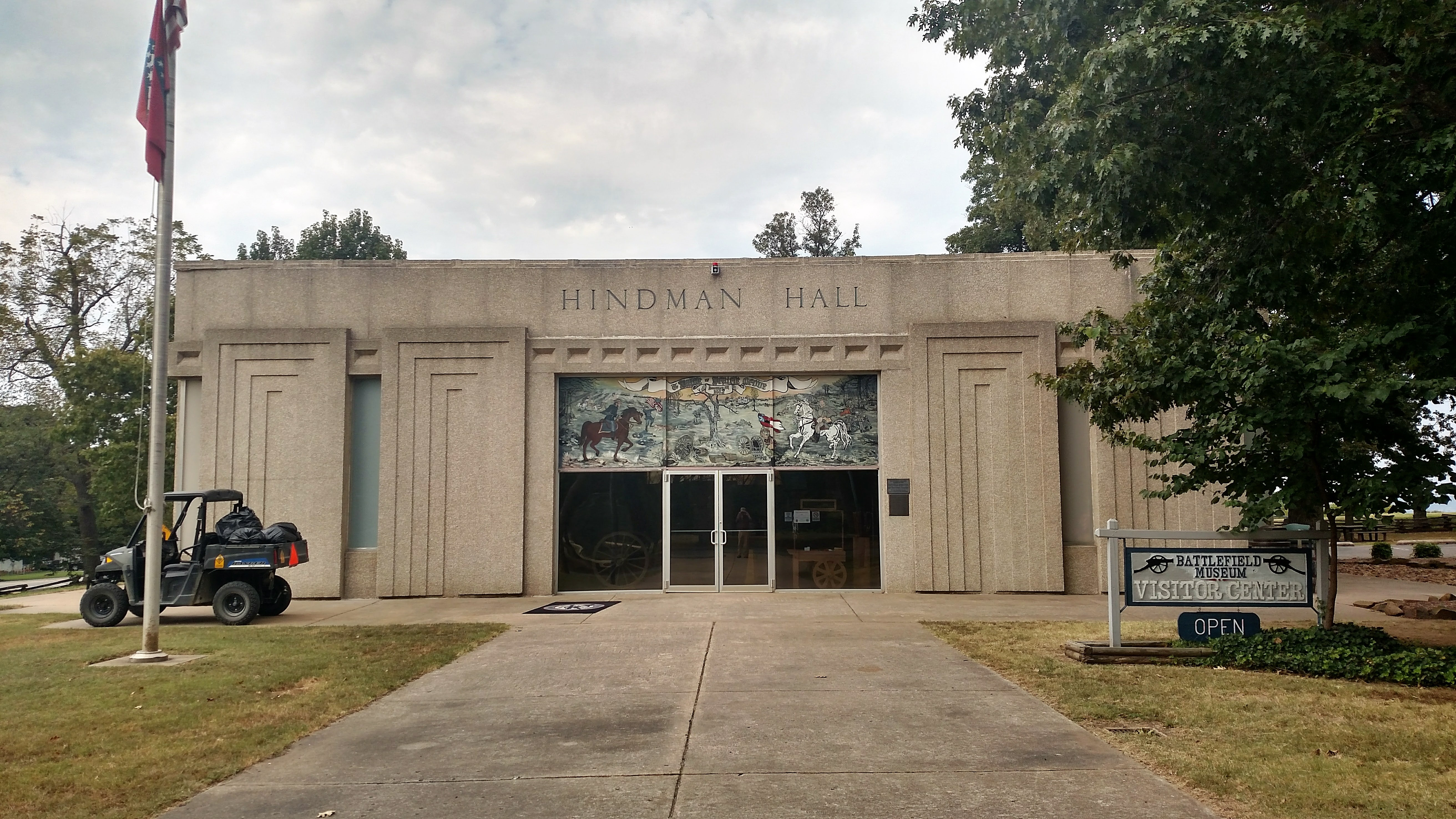
Hindman Hall museum and visitor center at the Prairie Grove Battlefield

On the night of September 27, 1868, while sitting in his home with his children, Hindman was shot through a window of his home. He was hit in the neck and jaw, and his windpipe was severed. His wife carried him onto the porch, and neighbors gathered around. Hindman suggested that the shooting was politically motivated, and asked a relative of his wife to take care of his family. He died early the next morning. The assassination was a shock to Arkansas. Many accused the Republican Party of being involved in the murder, but the assassin was not known. Louis D. Vaughn claimed to have been hired by Daniel A. Linthicum to commit the murder, but it was later determined that Vaughn was only trying to get back at Linthicum for exposing him as a bigamist in 1866. In 1876, an arsonist in Georgia claimed before his execution to have murdered Hindman, but his testimony contradicted the known facts of the case. Hindman is buried at what is now known as Maple Hill Cemetery in Helena, his remains having been moved there in 1870. Hindman Hall, the museum at Prairie Grove Battlefield State Park, was constructed using funds left by the estate of Hindman's son Biscoe for a memorial for Hindman.

== See also ==
- List of American Civil War generals (Confederate)
- List of assassinated American politicians
- List of assassinations by firearm
- List of United States representatives from Arkansas
- List of unsolved murders (before 1900)

== Sources ==
- Castel, Albert E. (1992). Decision in the West: The Atlanta Campaign of 1864. Lawrence, Kansas: University Press of Kansas. ISBN 0-7006-0748-X.
- Christ, Mark K. (2010). Civil War Arkansas 1863: The Battle for a State. Norman, Oklahoma: University of Oklahoma Press. ISBN 978-0-8061-4433-7.
- Cozzens, Peter (1996) [1992]. This Terrible Sound: The Battle of Chickamauga (Illini books ed.). University of Illinois Press. ISBN 0-252-06594-8.
- Cunningham, O. Edward (2012) [2007]. Joiner, Gary D.; Smith, Timothy B. (eds.). Shiloh and the Western Campaign of 1862. New York City: Savas Beatie. ISBN 978-1-932714-34-0.
- DeBlack, Thomas A. (2003). With Fire and Sword: Arkansas, 1861–1874. Fayetteville, Arkansas: University of Arkansas Press. ISBN 1-55728-740-6.
- Dougan, Michael (1970). "A Look at the "Family" in Arkansas Politics, 1858–1865". Arkansas Historical Quarterly. 29 (2): 99–111. doi:10.2307/40019277. JSTOR 40019277.
- Geise, William Royston (2022). Forsyth, Michael J. (ed.). The Confederate Military Forces in the Trans-Mississippi West, 1861–1865. El Dorado Hills, California: Savas Beatie. ISBN 978-1-61121-621-9.
- Lemke, W. J. (1955). "The Hindman Family Portraits". Arkansas Historical Quarterly. 14 (2): 103–108. doi:10.2307/40025466. JSTOR 40025466.
- Neal, Diane; Kremm, Thomas W. (1993). Lion of the South: General Thomas C. Hindman. Macon, Georgia: Mercer University Press. ISBN 0-86554-556-1.
- Oates, Stephen B. (1994) [1961]. Confederate Cavalry West of the River (PhD). Austin, Texas: University of Texas Press. ISBN 0-292-71152-2.
- Piston, William Garrett; Rutherford, John C. (2021). "We Gave Them Thunder": Marmaduke's Raid and the Civil War in Missouri and Arkansas. Springfield, Missouri: Ozarks Studies Institute. ISBN 978-1-7346290-1-9.
- Shea, William L. (1994). "1862: "A Continual Thunder"". In Christ, Mark K. (ed.). Rugged and Sublime: The Civil War in Arkansas. Fayetteville, Arkansas: University of Arkansas Press. pp. 22–58. ISBN 1-55728-356-7.
- Shea, William L. (2009). Fields of Blood: The Prairie Grove Campaign. Chapel Hill, North Carolina: University of North Carolina Press. ISBN 978-0-8078-3315-5.
- Shea, William L. (2012). "Prelude to Prairie Grove: Cane Hill, November 28, 1862". Arkansas Historical Quarterly. 71 (2): 122–150.
- Shea, William L.; Hess, Earl J. (1992). Pea Ridge: Civil War Campaign in the West. Chapel Hill, North Carolina: University of North Carolina Press. ISBN 0-8078-4669-4.
- Sword, Wiley (1999) [1974]. Shiloh: Bloody April. Dayton, Ohio: Morningside Bookshop.
- Symonds, Craig L. (1997). Stonewall of the West: Patrick Cleburne and the Civil War. Lawrence, Kansas: University Press of Kansas. ISBN 0-7006-0820-6.
- Warner, Ezra J. (2006) [1959]. Generals in Gray (Louisiana Paperback ed.). Baton Rouge, Louisiana: Louisiana State University Press. ISBN 978-0-8071-3150-3.
- Woods, James M. (1987). Rebellion and Realignment: Arkansas's Road to Secession. Fayetteville, Arkansas: University of Arkansas Press. ISBN 0-938626-59-0.

U.S. House of Representatives
Preceded by Alfred B. Greenwood	Member of the U.S. House of Representatives from Arkansas's 1st congressional district 1859–1861	Vacant Title next held by Logan H. Roots; 1868
