= Helena Confederate Cemetery =

Historic cemetery in Phillips County, Arkansas, US

- U.S. National Register of Historic Places
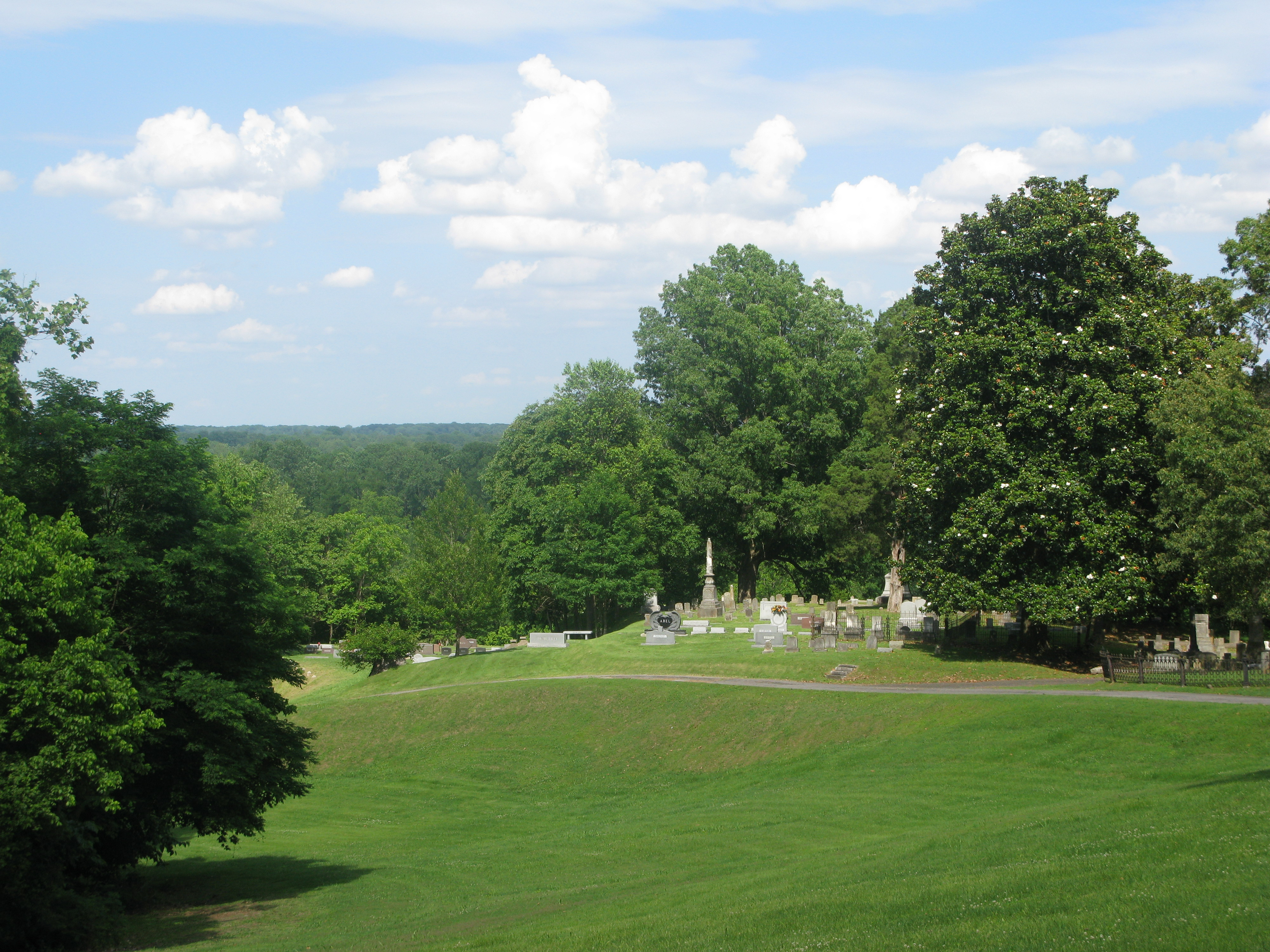

- Location within Arkansas Location within the United States
- Location: SW corner of Maple Hill Cemetery, approximately .5 mi. N of jct. of Poplar and Adams Sts., Helena, Arkansas
- Coordinates: 34°32′30″N 90°35′34″W
- Area: less than one acre
- Built: 1891
- Built by: M. Muldoon & Co. (Cleburne memorial)
- Architect: Leon Archias
- Architectural style: Classical Revival
- MPS: Civil War Commemorative Sculpture MPS
- NRHP reference No.: 96000501
- Added to NRHP: May 3, 1996

The Helena Confederate Cemetery is located in the southwest corner of the Maple Hill Cemetery on Holly Street in Helena, Arkansas. It is a small section of the larger cemetery, under one acre in size, and is marked by two significant memorials: the Confederate Memorial and the memorial to Confederate Army General Patrick Cleburne, whose burial here is the only known place associated with his life. The Cleburne memorial is a marble shaft 15 feet (4.6 m) in height, topped by an urn with flames coming from its top. The Confederate Memorial is a marble depiction of a soldier, mounted on a 30-foot (9.1 m) granite shaft, surrounded by pyramids of cannonballs and inverted cannons. The cemetery has more than 100 marked graves, 15 of which are unidentified Confederate dead, and 23 are of those killed in the 1863 Battle of Helena.

The cemetery was listed on the National Register of Historic Places in 1996.

== See also ==
- National Register of Historic Places listings in Phillips County, Arkansas
