= Asa Hodges =

American politician (1822–1900)

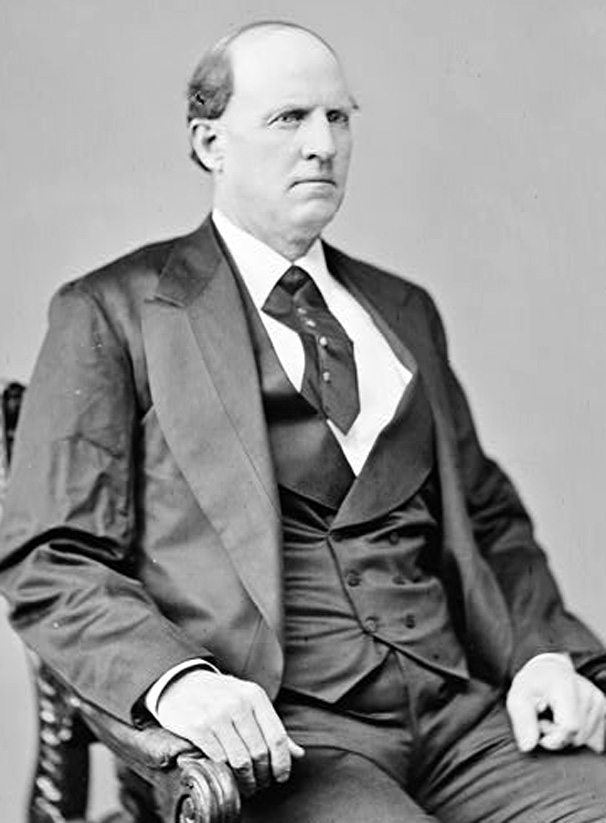
- Asa Hodges

Member of the U.S. House of Representatives from Arkansas's 1st district
- In office March 4, 1873 – March 3, 1875
- Preceded by: James M. Hanks
- Succeeded by: Lucien C. Gause

Member of the Arkansas State Senate from Crittenden County
- In office 1870–1873

Member of the Arkansas House of Representatives
- In office 1868

Personal details
- Born: January 22, 1822 Lawrence County, Alabama, U.S.
- Died: June 6, 1900 (aged 78) Marion, Arkansas, U.S.
- Resting place: Elmwood Cemetery
- Party: Republican
- Education: Hannibal-LaGrange University
- Profession: Planter, attorney

Asa Hodges (January 22, 1822 – June 6, 1900) was an American lawyer, slaveholder, and politician who served one term as a U.S. representative for Arkansas's 1st congressional district from 1873 to 1875.

== Biography ==
Born near Moulton in Lawrence County in northern Alabama, Hodges moved to Marion in Crittenden County in northeastern Arkansas. He attended La Grange Male and Female College in LaGrange, Missouri, now part of Hannibal-LaGrange University in Hannibal, Missouri. He studied law, was admitted to the bar in 1848, and practiced until 1860.

=== Personal life ===
On April 17, 1858, he married Caroline Sarah Turpin Chick, the widow of his relative, John W. Hodges.

=== Slaveholder ===
Prior to the American Civil War, Hodges owned many slaves near Memphis, Tennessee.

=== Arkansas legislature ===
He served as delegate to the Arkansas constitutional convention in 1867. He was a member of the Arkansas House of Representatives for a partial term in 1868 and the Arkansas Senate from 1870 to 1873.

==== Congress ====
Hodges was elected as a Republican to the 43rd United States Congress (March 4, 1873 – March 3, 1875) to Arkansas' First District. He did not seek reelection in 1874 to the Forty-fourth Congress and was succeeded by the Democrat Lucien C. Gause.

=== Later career and death ===
Thereafter, he engaged in farming.

He died near Marion and is interred next to his wife at Elmwood Cemetery in Memphis in Shelby County.

U.S. House of Representatives
Preceded by James M. Hanks	Member of the U.S. House of Representatives from Arkansas's 1st congressional district 1873–1875	Succeeded by Lucien C. Gause
