= Statue of Patrick Cleburne =

Coordinates: 32°20′46″N 97°23′21″W

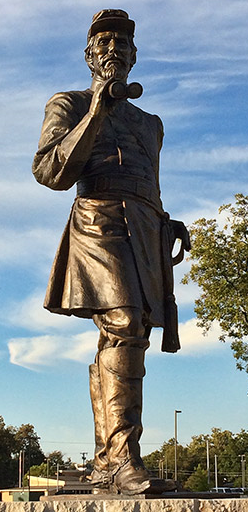
- Location: Cleburne, Texas

A Statue of Patrick Cleburne stands in Cleburne, Texas. The statue honoring Confederate General Patrick Cleburne, the town's namesake, was installed in 2015.

== History ==
Patrick Cleburne was born in County Cork, Ireland. During the American Civil War, he reached the rank of General in the Confederate States Army. Towards the end of the war, Cleburne became outspoken in favor of emancipation.

The town of Cleburne, Texas was named after the general, and the statue was installed in 2015, close to the Johnson County Courthouse.

The 6-foot tall bronze statue was created by local artist Jeff Gottfried and was installed at a busy intersection between Buffalo and Chambers streets.

== Controversy ==
During the 2020 George Floyd protests, a number of monuments and statues of Confederate figures were removed. During the protests, there were calls to remove the statue to Patrick Cleburne, however mayor Scott Cain emphasized Cleburnes anti-slavery views, and the fact that Cleburne himself was an immigrant from County Cork, Ireland.

== See also ==
- Confederate Memorial Arch (Cleburne, Texas)
