= Maple Hill Cemetery (Helena-West Helena, Arkansas) =

Cemetery in Phillips County, Arkansas, US

- U.S. National Register of Historic Places
- U.S. Historic district
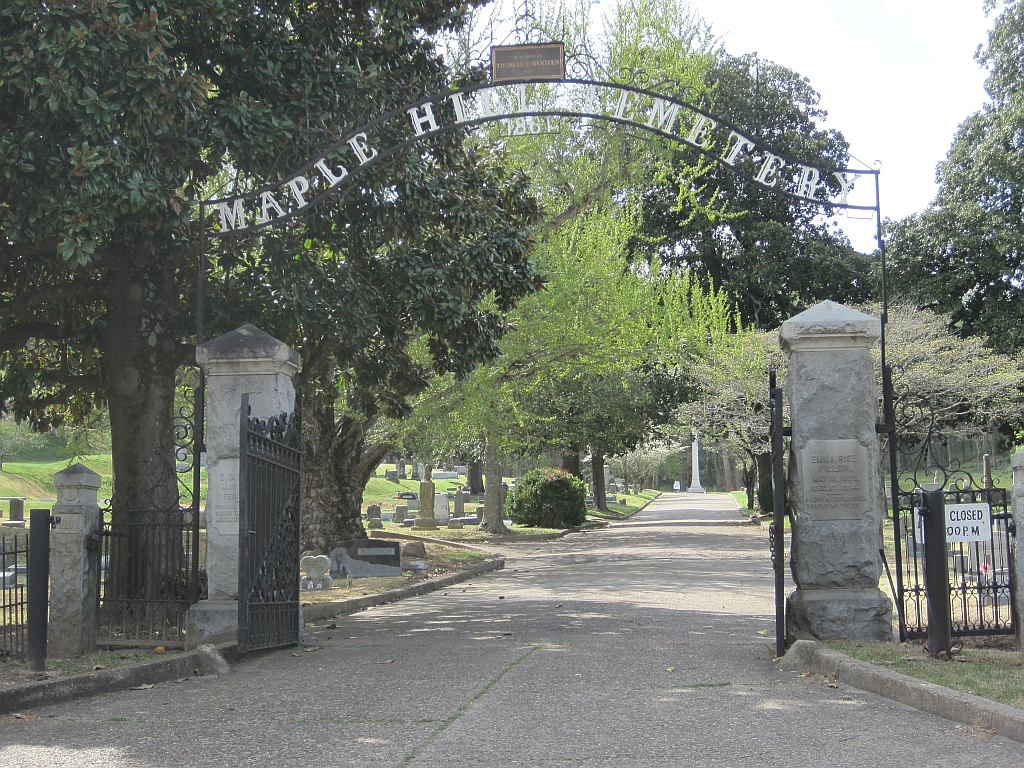
- Entrance gate

- Location within Arkansas Location within the United States
- Location: North Holly Street, Helena, Arkansas
- Coordinates: 34°32′34″N 90°35′24″W
- Area: 28.5 acres (11.5 ha)
- Built: 1865
- Architect: Leon Archais (landscape)
- Architectural style: Beaux Arts, rural cemetery movement
- NRHP reference No.: 00000318
- Added to NRHP: April 6, 2000

Maple Hill Cemetery (also known as Evergreen Cemetery) is located on Holly Street, north of the center of Helena, Arkansas, United States. It is set on 37 acres (15 ha) of land on the east side of Crowley's Ridge, overlooking the Mississippi River, and is the city's largest cemetery. The cemetery was established in 1865, and is laid out in the rural cemetery style which was popular in the mid-19th century. It departs from the norms of this style in retaining a largely rectilinear layout despite having parklike features. The cemetery's entrance is through an elaborately decorated wrought iron archway, whose posts were given in 1914, and whose arch was given in 1975. The largest monument in the cemetery is the Coolidge Monument, placed by Henry P. Coolidge on the family plot, which is at the highest point of section 3; the monument is a granite column 21 feet (6.4 m) in height, with a life-size sculpture of Coolidge on top.

Most of the cemetery (an area of 28.5 acres (11.5 ha) excluding the then-empty section 6) was listed on the National Register of Historic Places in 2000. Helena's Confederate Cemetery, located in the southwest corner of this cemetery, is also separately listed on the National Register.

Notable burials include US Representative James M. Hanks and Confederate generals Thomas C. Hindman and James C. Tappan.

== See also ==
- National Register of Historic Places listings in Phillips County, Arkansas
