= Confederate Memorial Arch (Cleburne, Texas) =

Monument in Cleburne, Texas

Coordinates: 32°20′46″N 97°22′22″W

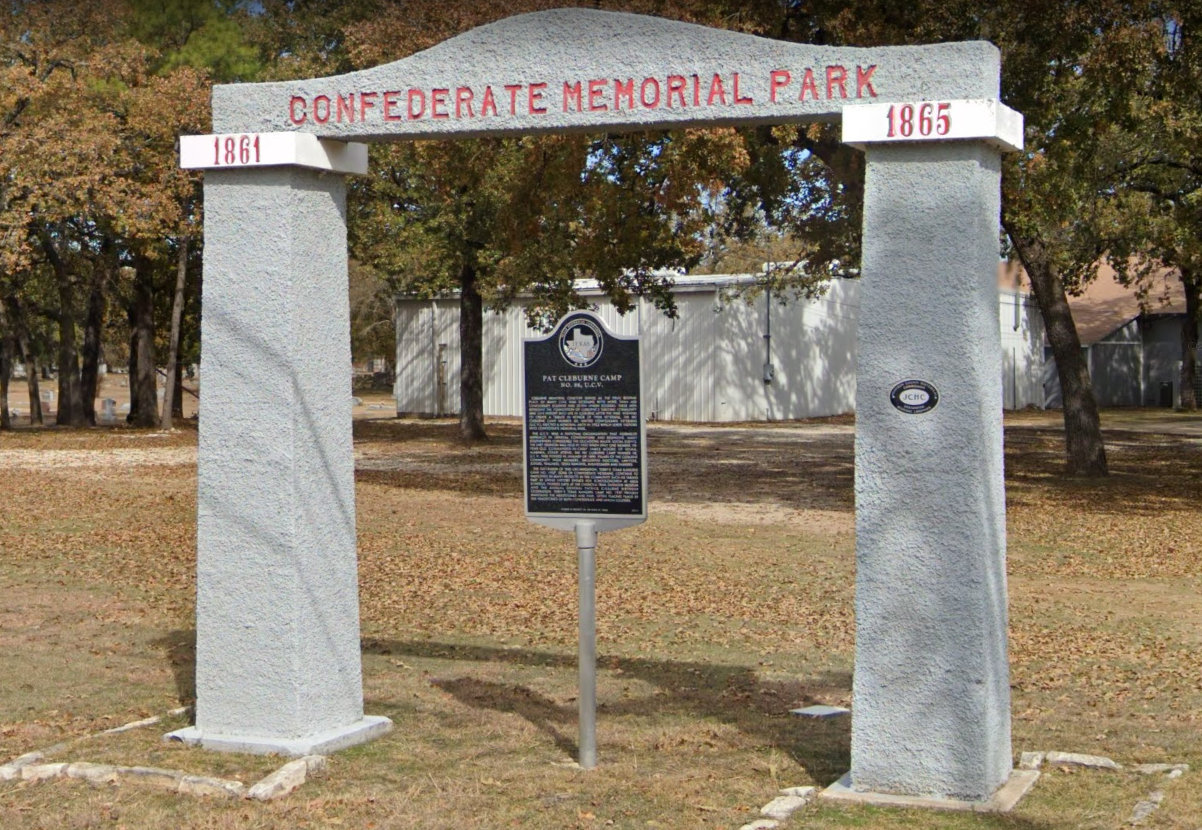
- Interactive map of Confederate Memorial Arch
- Location: Cleburne, Texas

The Confederate Memorial Arch is a monument located in Cleburne, Texas in memory of the Confederacy The arch stands on the edge of the Cleburne Memorial Cemetery.

== History ==
In 1894 land was donated by Ann and C.Y. Kouns for the cemetery to build a Confederate Park that would be used by the local United Confederate Veterans. In 1922 'The Confederate Memorial Park Committee' was established with the intention to create a memorial to the Confederate soldiers buried in the cemetery. The archway was designed at an angle so that a Confederate Battle Flag design could be formed in the grounds. Construction was complete in 1922, however the flag design was never implemented.

== See also ==
- Statue of Patrick Cleburne (Cleburne, Texas)

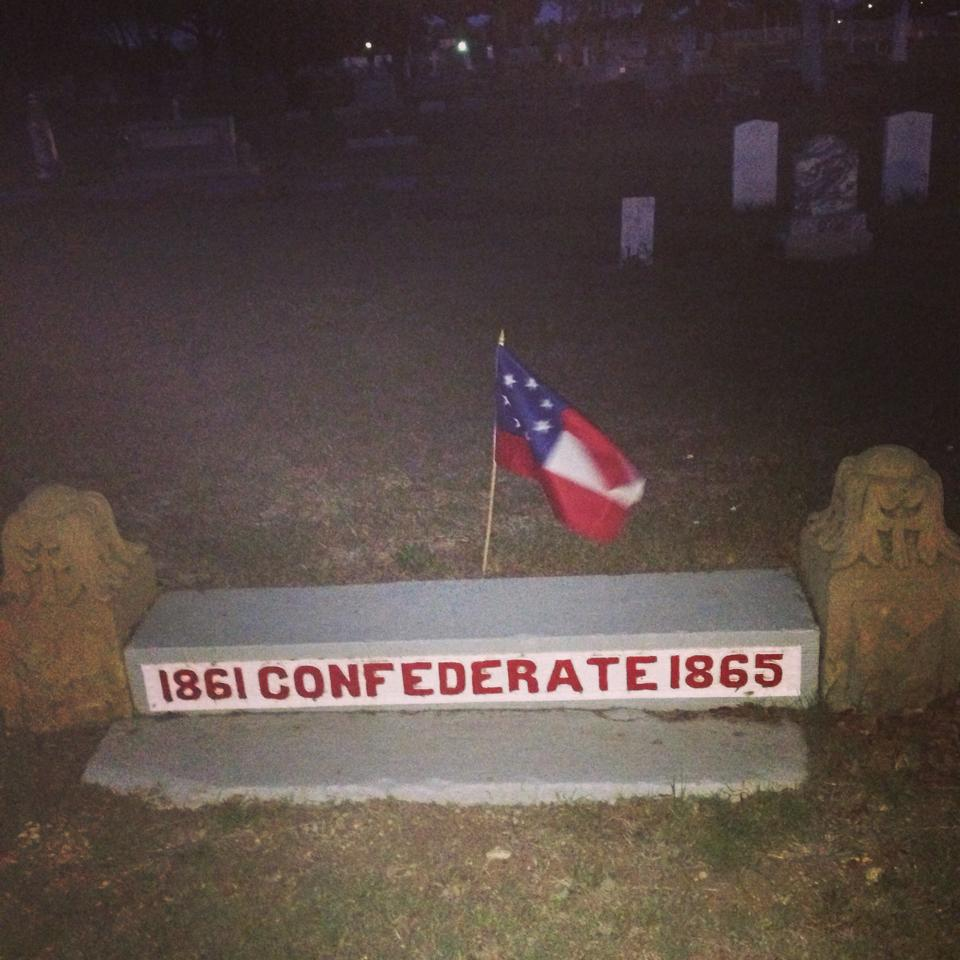
Nearby Confederate Memorial
