= Alfred B. Greenwood =

American politician

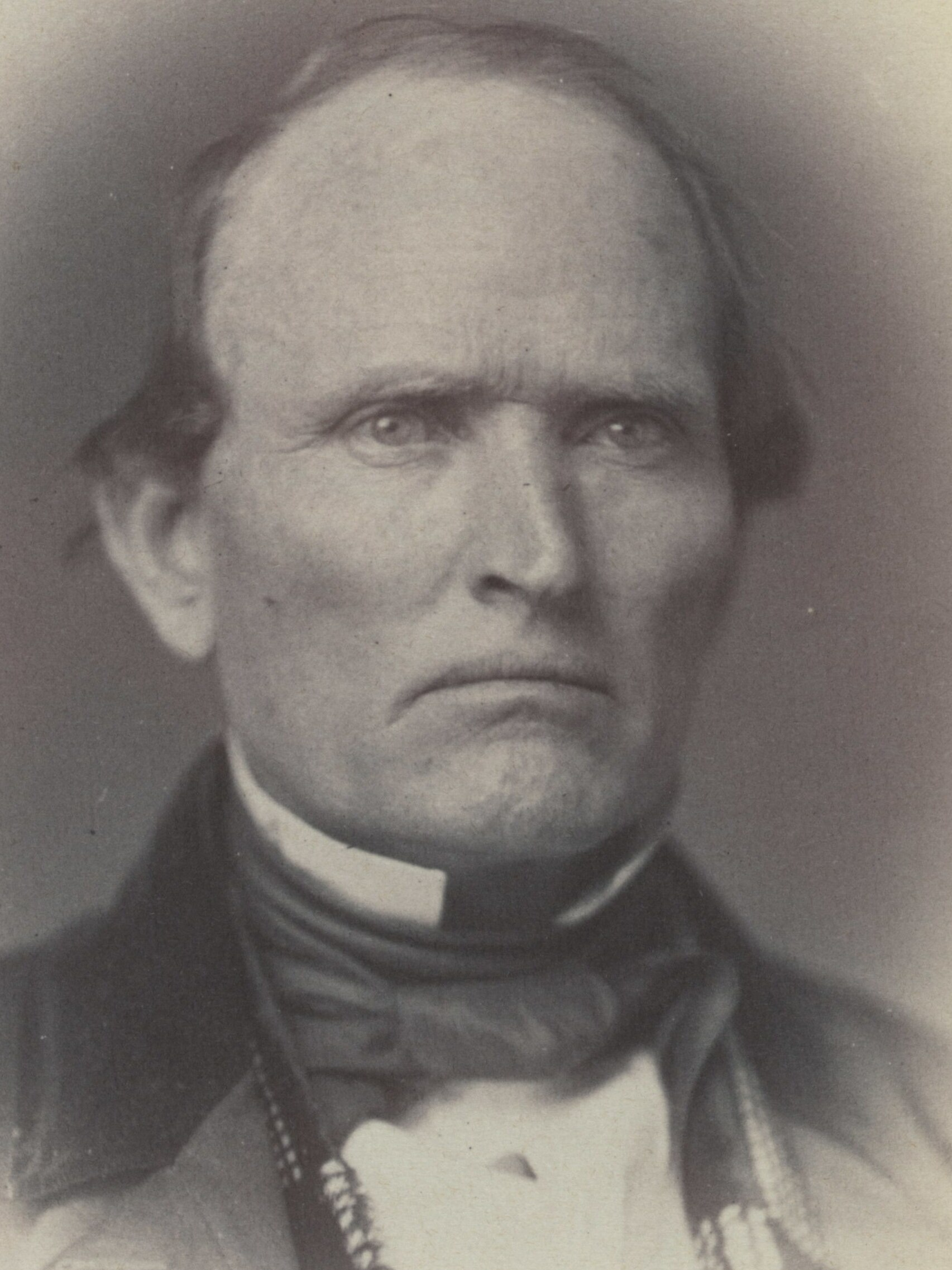

Member of the Confederate States Congress from Arkansas
- In office 1862–1865
- Preceded by: Position created
- Succeeded by: Position abolished

11th Commissioner of Indian Affairs
- In office May 13, 1859 – April 13, 1861
- President: James Buchanan; Abraham Lincoln
- Preceded by: James W. Denver
- Succeeded by: William P. Dole

Member of the U.S. House of Representatives from Arkansas's 1st district
- In office March 4, 1853 – March 3, 1859
- Preceded by: District created
- Succeeded by: Thomas C. Hindman

Member of the Arkansas House of Representatives from the Benton County district
- In office November 7, 1842 – November 2, 1846
- Preceded by: Robert Hubbard
- Succeeded by: various

Personal details
- Born: Alfred Burton Greenwood; July 11, 1811 Franklin County, Georgia, U.S.
- Died: October 4, 1889 (aged 78) Bentonville, Arkansas, U.S.
- Resting place: Bentonville Cemetery
- Party: Democratic
- Spouse: Sarah A. Hilburn (m. 1833; died 1884)
- Children: 12
- Education: University of Georgia

Alfred Burton Greenwood (July 11, 1811 – October 4, 1889) was an American attorney, judge, and a politician who served three terms in the U.S. House of Representatives from 1853 to 1859. When Arkansas seceded from the Union in the Civil War, he was elected to the Confederate Congress as a Democrat. In between, he served under President James Buchanan as Commissioner of Indian Affairs.

== Early life and education ==
Alfred Burton Greenwood was born to Elizabeth (née Ingram) Hugh B. Greenwood in Franklin County, Georgia, on July 11, 1811. He was educated in Lawrenceville, Georgia. He graduated from the University of Georgia in Athens, Georgia. He was admitted to the bar in 1832 and relocated to Decatur, Georgia He owned slaves.

== Career ==
In 1837, he was appointed as a quartermaster as part of the Cherokee removal commonly known as the Trail of Tears. Greenwood’s detachment led a grouping of 1,000 native Americans from Georgia and Tennessee to Oklahoma.

In December 1838, after seeing what Arkansas had to offer, he resigned his commission. He moved his family to Bentonville, Arkansas, and became the small town's first attorney. He went into politics and was elected to two terms in the Arkansas General Assembly; serving from 1842 to 1845. He was elected to serve as prosecuting attorney of the Fourth Circuit from 1845 to 1851 and as circuit judge from 1851 to 1853.

=== Congress ===
He was elected as a Democrat to the United States House of Representatives from Arkansas, and served from March 4, 1853, to March 3, 1859. In 1856, he won re-election to his third term after a bitter debate at the local Democratic Convention, which took 276 ballots before finally settling on Greenwood over Thomas Hindman.

During his final term in office, he served as chairman of the House Committee on Indian Affairs.

=== Buchanan administration ===
He was appointed in 1858 as Commissioner of Indian Affairs by President James Buchanan. He served in that role from May 13, 1859, to April 13, 1861. He was offered the role of U.S. Secretary of the Interior after Jacob Thompson resigned, but declined the position.

=== Confederate Congress ===
With the outbreak of the Civil War in 1861, Arkansas seceded from the Union and Greenwood was elected to the Congress of the Confederate States from Arkansas and served from 1862 to 1865. During this time, Confederate president Jefferson Davis asked Greenwood to try to recruit members of the Cherokee and Choctaw nations into the Confederate army.

In 1864 he was appointed by Jefferson Davis to serve as tax collector for Arkansas.

=== Later career ===
In 1873, Greenwood moved to Cassville, Missouri, where he practiced law. He was elected as a judge and served in that role until he returned to Arkansas in June 1879.

== Personal life ==
Greenwood married Sarah A. Hilburn (1819–1884) of Union, South Carolina, in 1833. Together, they had 12 children.

== Death ==
Greenwood died on October 4, 1889, in Bentonville. He was interred at Bentonville Cemetery.

== Legacy ==
Both Greenwood, Arkansas, and Greenwood County, Kansas, are named after him.

U.S. House of Representatives
| Preceded by District created | Member of the U.S. House of Representatives from Arkansas's 1st congressional district 1853–1859 | Succeeded by Thomas C. Hindman |
