= Patrick R. Cleburne Confederate Cemetery =

American Civil War cemetery in Clayton County, Georgia, United States

- Interactive map of Patrick R. Cleburne Confederate Cemetery

Details
- Established: 1872
- Location: Jonesboro, Georgia
- Country: United States
- Coordinates: 33°31′50″N 84°21′11″W
- No. of graves: 600–1,000
- Find a Grave: Patrick R. Cleburne Confederate Cemetery

Patrick R. Cleburne Confederate Cemetery is a memorial cemetery located in the city of Jonesboro, Georgia, United States. It was named in honor of General Patrick Cleburne. This cemetery was a burial site for Confederate soldiers who died in the Battle of Jonesboro in 1864. This cemetery is open daily until dusk. It is one of six Confederate cemeteries maintained by the Georgia Building Authority.

After the Battle of Jonesboro, fallen soldiers under leadership of Stephen D. Lee and William J. Hardee were buried as unknown soldiers where they initially died at. In 1872, after the American Civil War ended, the Georgia General Assembly funded $1,000 so that the soldiers could be relocated and reburied in a general area. Initially, each grave was marked with a tin marker; however, by the 1930s, the markers were gone. The Patrick R. Cleburne Confederate Cemetery has 712 headstones with only three marked headstones. The three known soldiers in this cemetery are Agnatius Brooke, Robert Lindsay and Abner Joel Yancey. The headstones are patterned in the shape of the Confederate Flag. The walkways are shaped in the letter X and graves fill in the triangles of the X.

It is estimated that 600–1000 Confederate soldiers are buried here. The history behind this cemetery and other confederate cemeteries in Georgia is a mystery and continues to be researched today. Organizations continue to preserve historic documents and present new information to understand the history of Georgia and its confederate soldiers during the American Civil War.

== Events and traditions ==
- In 1934, a granite monument, stone and metal fence, and stone archway were added. The ceremonies were attended by the last two survivors of the battle.
- In 1971, Georgia governor Jimmy Carter assigned the upkeep of the six Georgian Confederate cemeteries to the Georgia Building Authority.
- A grave-marking ceremony was held in honor of twice named Roll of Honor, Ensign Robert Lindsey, a fallen confederate soldier, from Company D, 4th Kentucky Infantry during May 1992 at the Patrick R. Cleburne Confederate Cemetery. He died in Clayton County, Georgia while carrying the company colors to the line. The exact grave site is unknown; however, the 4th Kentucky Infantry and the Frankie Lyle chapter of United Daughters of the Confederacy placed a marker in his honor at the cemetery.
- On Sunday, April 24, 1999 the United Daughters of the Confederacy and the Sons of Confederate Veterans held the annual Confederate Memorial Day ceremony at the cemetery with re-enactors of the Civil War led by a bagpiper. The re-enactors performed the 21-gun salute in confederate uniforms. Scott Gilbert, relative of the last confederate living in Henry County, Georgia, Judge A.G. Harris, spoke to the crowd.
