= James M. Hanks =

American politician, lawyer, and farmer (1833–1909)

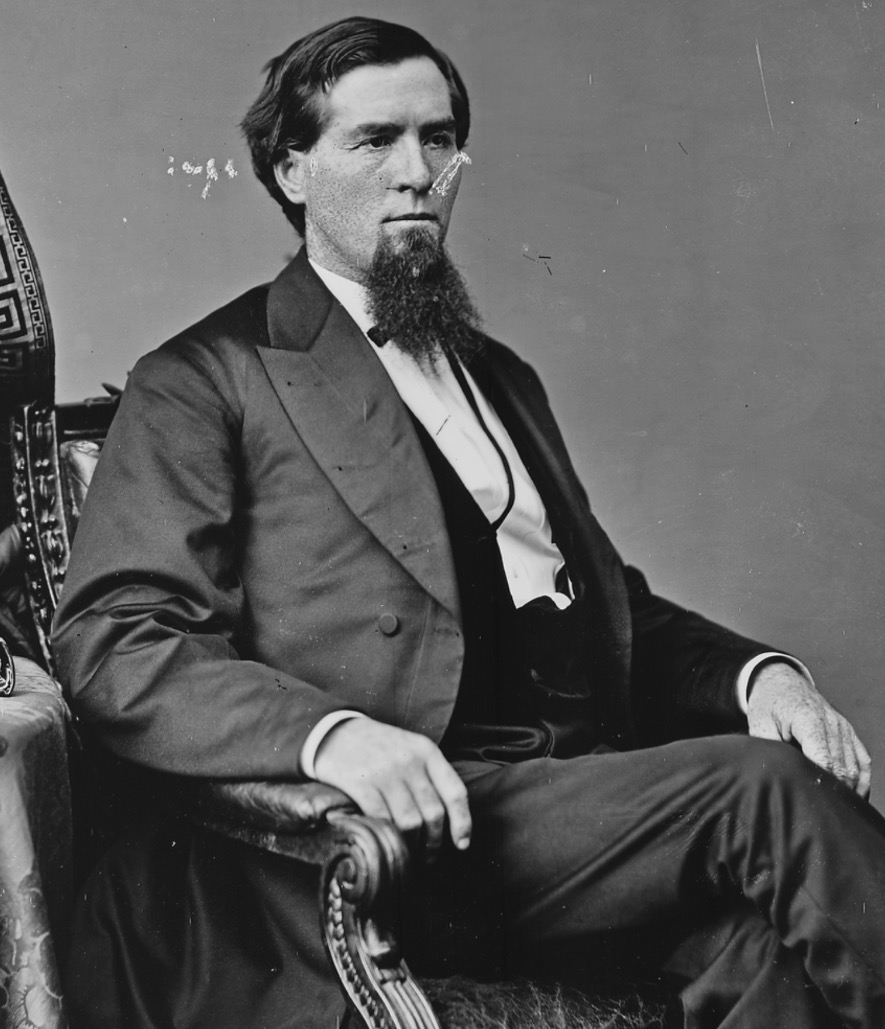
- Portrait of Hanks by Mathew Brady, c. 1860 – c. 1865

Member of the U.S. House of Representatives from Arkansas's 1st district
- In office March 4, 1871 – March 3, 1873
- Preceded by: Logan H. Roots
- Succeeded by: Asa Hodges

Personal details
- Born: James Millander Hanks; February 12, 1833 Helena, Arkansas, US
- Died: May 24, 1909 (aged 76) Helena, Arkansas, US
- Resting place: Maple Hill Cemetery
- Party: Democratic
- Occupation: Politician, lawyer, farmer

James Millander Hanks (February 12, 1833 – May 24, 1909) was an American politician, lawyer, and farmer. A Democrat, he was a member of the United States House of Representatives from Arkansas.

== Early life and education ==
Hanks was born on February 12, 1833, in Helena, Arkansas, the son of Fleetwood Hanks and Francis Elizabeth (née Sanford) Hanks. He was reared at Estevan Hall. Educated at public schools, he studied at Indiana University Southeast, Jackson College, and the University of Louisville, graduating from the lattermost institution in 1855, with a law degree.

== Career ==
Hanks read law, and after being admitted to the bar, began practicing in Helena. He entered a partnership with Charles W. Adams. From September 17, 1865, to late July 1868, he was judge of the 1st Arkansas Judicial Court district; the Biographical Directory of the United States Congress states he began the term in 1864. He owned slaves.

Hanks was a Democrat. He was a member of the United States House of Representatives, from March 4, 1871, to March 3, 1873, representing Arkansas's 1st district. He was the first Helena resident to serve in the House. He was not nominated for the following election. Ideologically, he was liberal.

After serving in Congress, Hanks retired from public service and worked as a farmer. He also owned an insurance company.

== Personal life and death ==
On February 3, 1859, Hanks married Helena Thompson, with whom he had two sons, both dying before reaching adulthood. He was a Methodist. He died on May 24, 1909, aged 76, in Helena, and was buried at Maple Hill Cemetery, in Helena. Archives of his papers are held by the Arkansas State Archives and the David W. Mullins Library.

U.S. House of Representatives
| Preceded by =Logan H. Roots | Member of the U.S. House of Representatives from Arkansas's 1st congressional district 1871–1873 | Succeeded by Asa Hodges |
