= Logan H. Roots =

American politician (1841–1893)

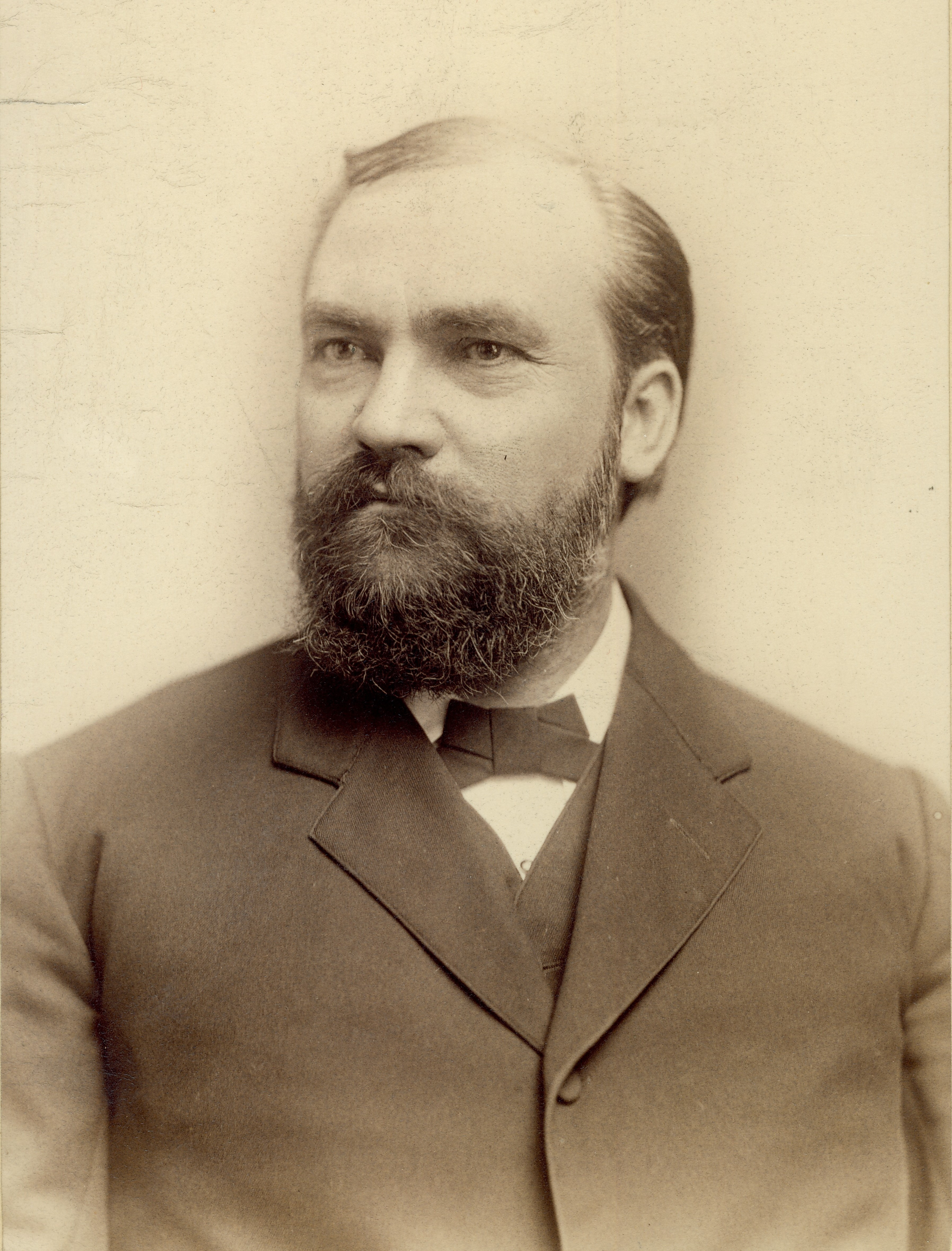

Member of the U.S. House of Representatives from Arkansas's 1st district
- In office June 22, 1868 – March 3, 1871
- Succeeded by: James M. Hanks

Personal details
- Born: Logan Holt Roots; March 26, 1841 Perry County, Illinois, U.S.
- Died: May 30, 1893 (aged 52) Little Rock, Arkansas, U.S.
- Resting place: Oakland Cemetery, Little Rock, Arkansas, U.S.
- Party: Republican
- Education: Illinois State Normal University
- Occupation: Businessman; banker

Military service
- Branch: United States Volunteers
- Years of service: 1862–1865
- Rank: Brevet Lieutenant Colonel
- Unit: 81st Illinois Infantry
- Wars: American Civil War

Logan Holt Roots (March 26, 1841 – May 30, 1893) was an American politician who served as the U.S. representative for Arkansas's 1st congressional district from 1868 to 1871. He was a member of the Republican Party. He is the namesake of Fort Logan H. Roots.

== Early life and education ==
Roots was born in Perry County, Illinois. He completed preparatory studies and graduated in 1862 from Illinois State Normal University. He assisted in recruiting the 81st Illinois Infantry, in which he served until the close of the Civil War. Commissioned a first lieutenant, by the time of his discharge in 1865, he was breveted a lieutenant colonel. After the war, Roots settled in Arkansas to engage in planting and business.

== Political career ==
Upon the readmission of Arkansas to the Union, Roots served as an internal revenue collector for the first district of Arkansas. Roots was elected as a Republican to the Fortieth Congress and reelected to the Forty-first Congress and served from June 22, 1868, to March 3, 1871. He was an unsuccessful candidate for reelection in 1870 to the Forty-second Congress. After his time as a U.S. Representative, Roots was appointed marshal for the U.S. District Court for the Western District of Arkansas. Political scandal led to his removal the following year.

== Later life ==
In 1891, Roots was named the first president of the Arkansas Bankers Association. He served as president of the First National Bank of Little Rock until his death. He died at his home in Little Rock on May 30, 1893, and is interred there at Oakland Cemetery.

== Notes ==
U.S. House of Representatives
Preceded by District inactive	Member of the U.S. House of Representatives from Arkansas's 1st congressional district 1868–1871	Succeeded by James M. Hanks
