= Shell Service Station (Winston-Salem, North Carolina) =

Former gas station in Winston-Salem, North Carolina

- Shell Shaped Shell Service Station
- U.S. National Register of Historic Places
- U.S. Historic district – Contributing property
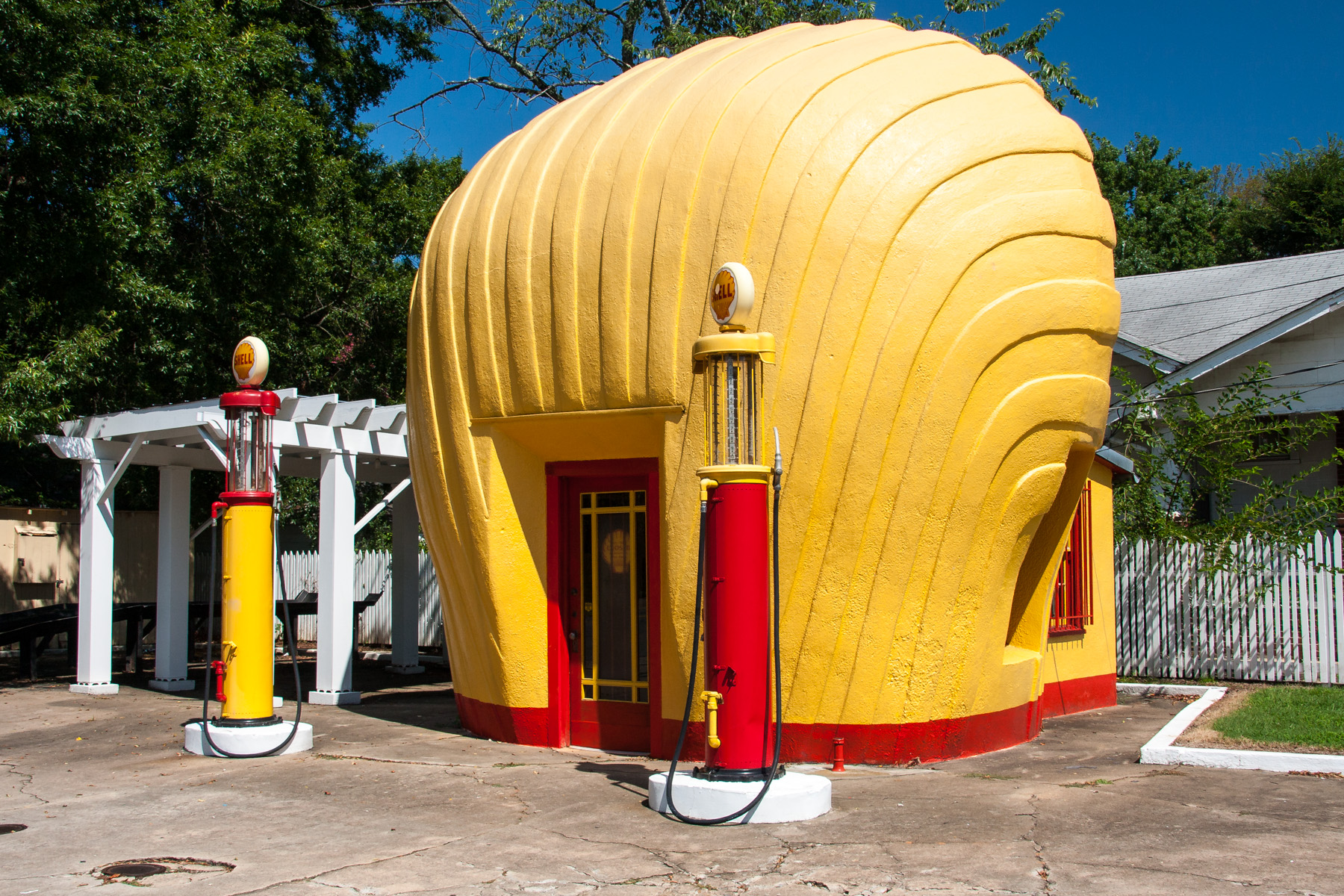
- This Shell Service Station is the only one to survive today from a total of eight built in the Winston-Salem area
- Interactive map of Shell Shaped Shell Service Station
- Location: Sprague and Peachtree Sts., NW, Winston-Salem, North Carolina
- Coordinates: 36°4′4″N 80°12′51″W
- Area: 0.5 acres (0.20 ha)
- Built: 1930
- Built by: Blum, Frank L.,& Co.
- NRHP reference No.: 76001322
- Added to NRHP: May 13, 1976

The Shell Service Station in Winston-Salem, North Carolina, is a former filling station constructed in 1930 following a decision in the 1920s by the new local Shell distributor, Quality Oil Company, to bring brand awareness to the market in Winston-Salem. The building is an example of representational or novelty architecture and was listed on the National Register of Historic Places on May 13, 1976. It is located in the Waughtown-Belview Historic District at the corner of Sprague and Peachtree Streets.

== History ==
This single-story Shell station, in the shape of a giant scallop shell, was built by R.H. Burton and his son, Ralph, in 1930 at Sprague and Peachtree Streets in Winston-Salem. The owners of the oil company decided to attract customers through a series of shell-shaped service stations. They built at least eight in the Winston-Salem area, but the station at Sprague and Peachtree is the only one remaining. The Shell station speaks to the literalism prevalent in some advertising during the 1920s and 1930s.

== Preservation ==
Preservation North Carolina, an organization dedicated to the preservation of historic sites, spent one year and $50,000 to bring the landmark station back to its original condition. Workers removed layers of faded yellow paint to reveal the Shell's original yellow-orange color. The original front door was repaired and a crack fixed that had been previously sealed with nothing more than black tar. The wooden, trellised shelter that housed the car wash and allowed cars to be washed and/or serviced in the shade was reconstructed as well. Quality Oil Company donated restored gas pumps and replica lamp posts to help finish off the restoration. The landmark now serves as a museum for Preservation North Carolina.

== See also ==
- Airplane Service Station, 1930 Powell, Tennessee station built in the shape of an airplane
- Beam's Shell Service Station and Office, 1930 Shell station also on the NRHP
- Teapot Dome Service Station, 1922 Zillah, Washington station built in the shape of a teapot
