= American tea culture =

Use of tea in the United States

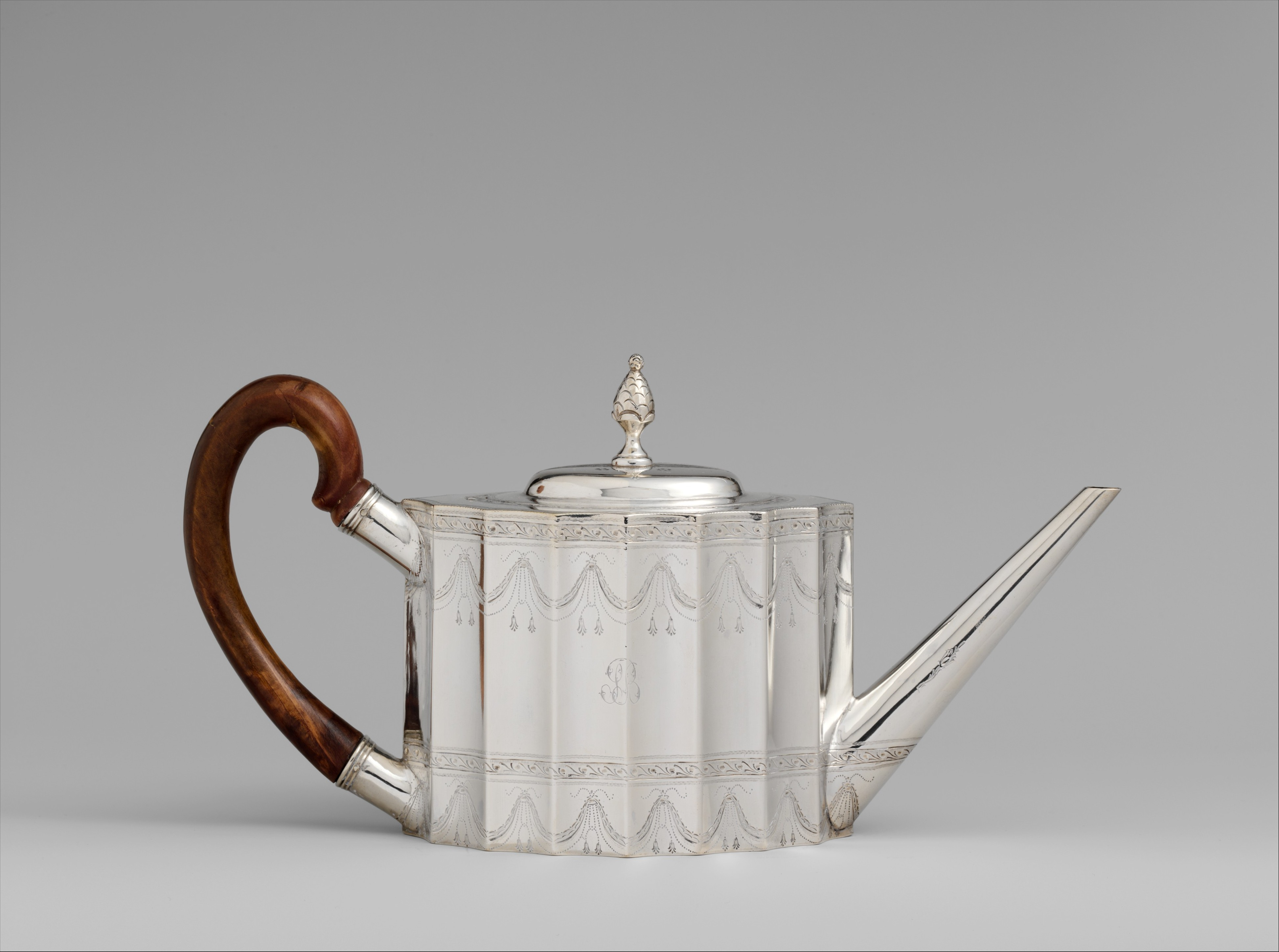
A silver teapot made by Paul Revere, an American silversmith, officer and patriot

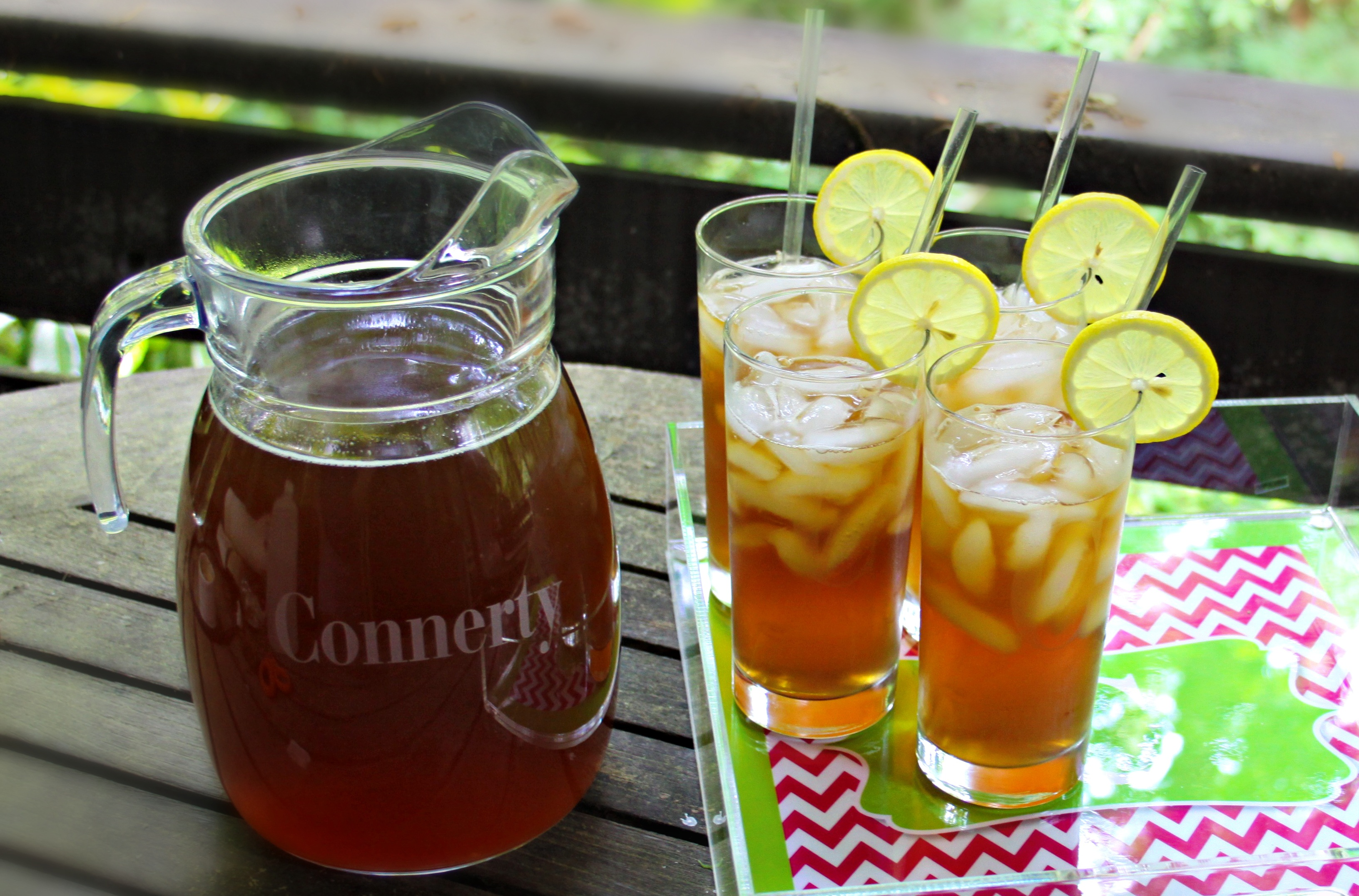
Southern Sweet Iced Tea

American tea culture encompasses the methods of preparation and means of consumption of tea within the context of the culture of the United States. About 85% of the tea consumed in the United States is served cold, usually as iced tea.

American restaurants and workplaces typically offer machine-made drip brew coffee by default, while hot tea brewed by the cup with tea bags is available by request. Tea parties can be celebrated for many occasions, from the very small and intimate to the large family gatherings and celebrations. In the U.S. south a regional favorite called sweet tea – which is brewed, sweetened, and chilled in advance of consumption – may be served at all meals and throughout the day as an alternate to other beverages.

Iced tea is more frequently consumed during periods of hot weather or in lower latitudes, and hot tea is likewise more common in colder weather in the north. Any confusion when one is visiting different parts of the country can easily be solved by explicitly asking for either "hot tea" or "iced tea". Afternoon tea, as a meal of its own, is rarely served in the U.S. except in ritualized special occasions such as the tea party or an afternoon out at a high-end hotel or restaurant, which may also offer cream tea on their menu.

== History ==
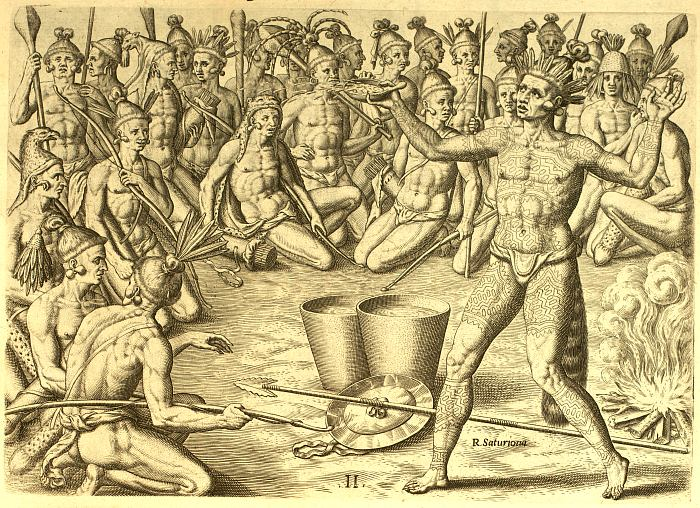
The Timucua chief Saturiwa (fl. 1562–1565) prepares his men for battle by drinking yaupon tea. Engraving by Jacques le Moyne and Theodor De Bry.

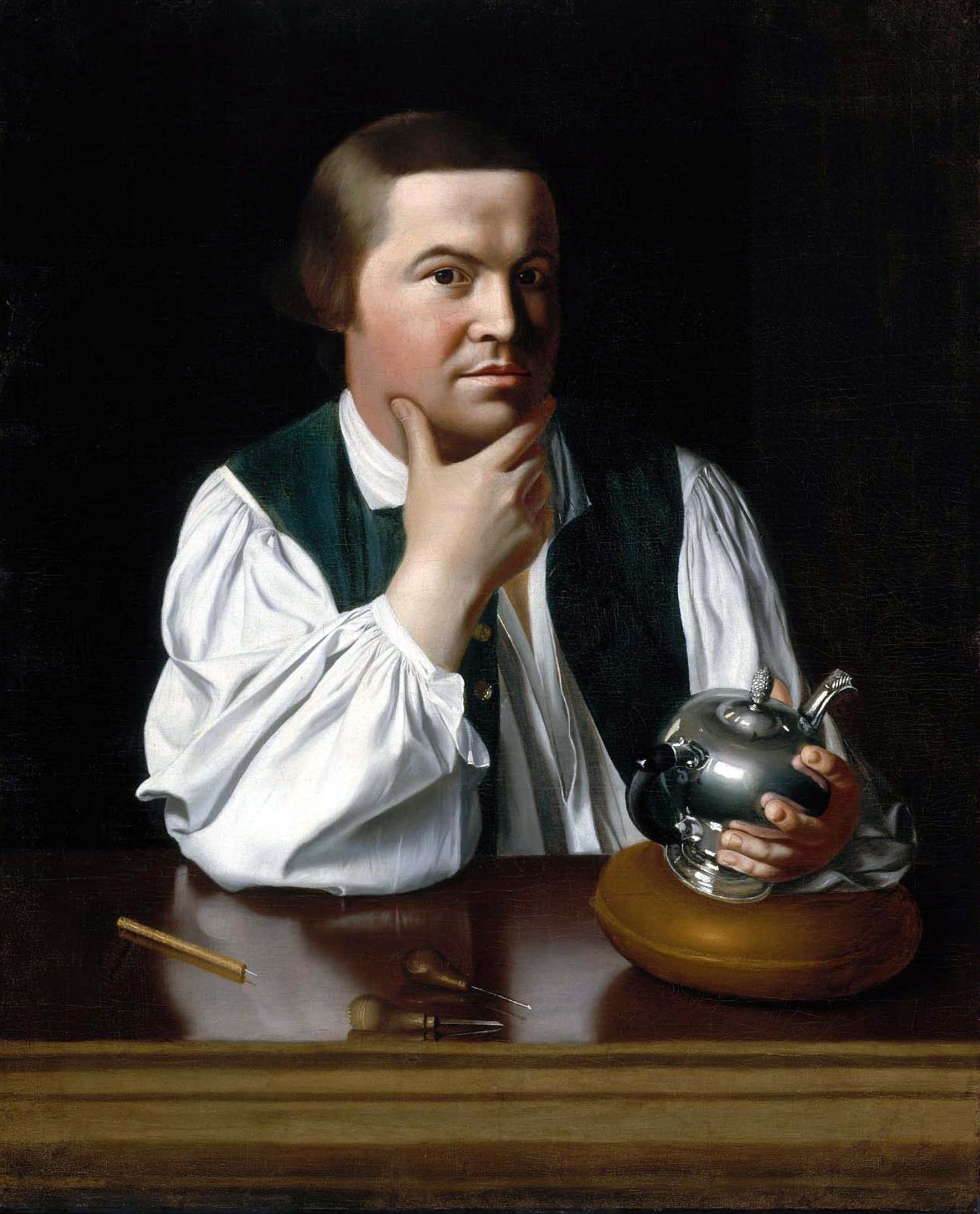
Paul Revere holds a silver teapot he has made.

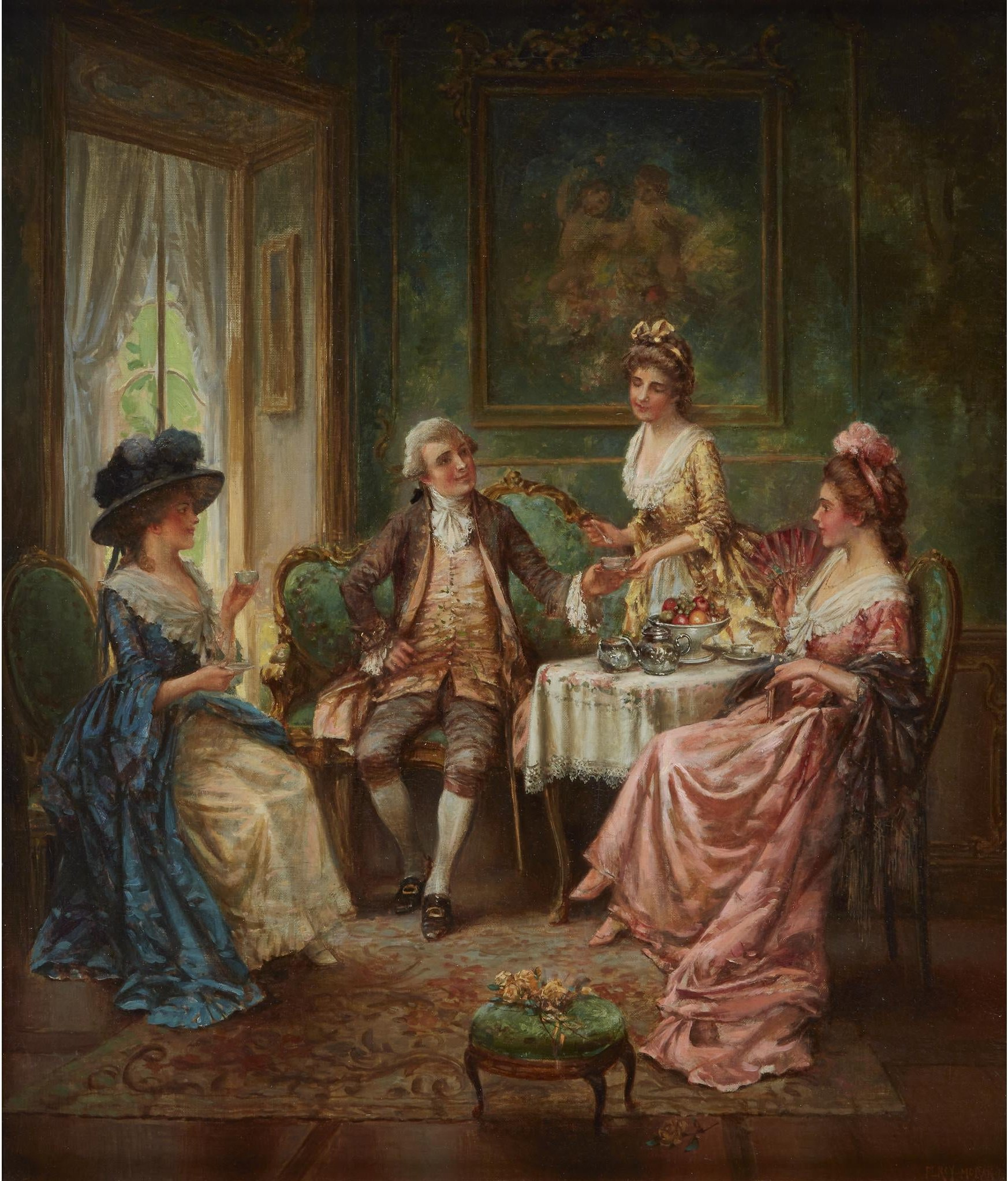
Tea Time by Edward Percy Moran, oil on canvas

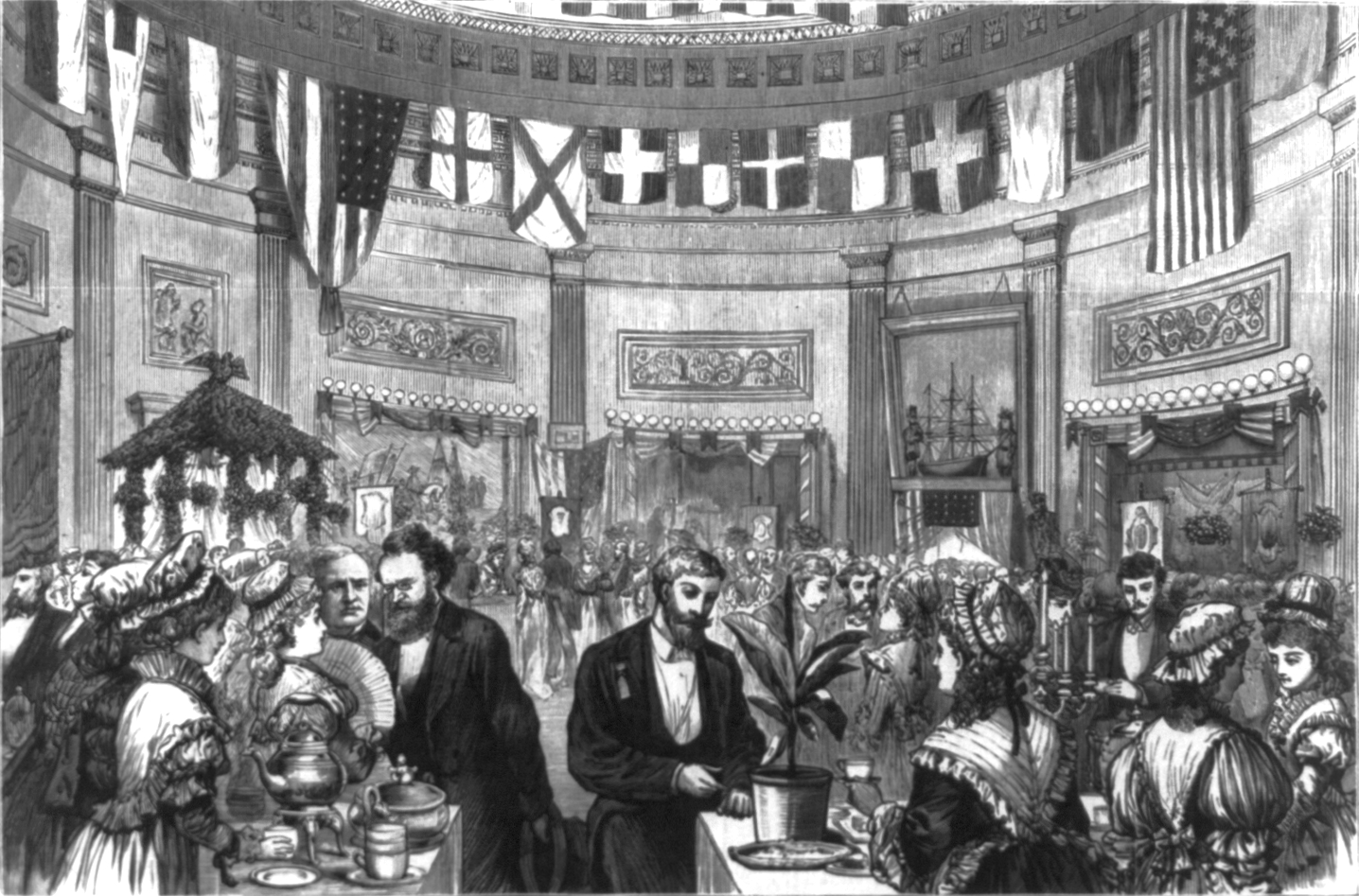
A tea party held in the U.S. Capitol in honor of America's Centennial, 1875. In this engraving, Carl Schurz (senator from Missouri) is standing at the tea table on the left.

The American tea culture is a part of the history of the United States, as tea has appealed to all classes and has adapted to the customs of the United States.

The Native peoples of North America drank various herbal teas, the most common of which was Yaupon tea, known as the "Beloved drink", "Cassina", or "White drink". It was brewed from yaupon holly (Ilex vomitoria), which is native to the Atlantic and Gulf Coasts. Native American tribes like the Chickasaw, Cherokee, Choctaw, Muscogee, and Timucua used the tea as a daily drink, as a social drink used in meetings, and in various rituals, many of which were associated with purification. Yaupon tea was adopted by European colonists as early as the 17th century who gave it various names like "Black drink", "Carolina Tea", "South Seas Tea", or "Indian tea".

=== Colonial and Revolutionary eras ===
True Asian tea (Camellia Sinensis) was first brought to North America by Dutch traders in the 17th century. In the Dutch colony of New Amsterdam, now known as New York, tea was served with the best silver strainers, the finest porcelain cups and pots, and wooden tea caddies. Regular shipments of tea to the American colonies began in the 1720s. Legally, American colonists were only supposed to buy British tea, but in reality, smuggling was widespread, and Dutch, French, and other teas were widely available.

Asian tea soon became a very popular drink in the American colonies, and tea parties were common among all classes. The first tea vendors in Boston were Benjamin Harris and Daniel Vernon, who received licenses to sell tea in 1690. In Salem, Massachusetts, tea leaves were boiled to create a bitter brew, then served as a vegetable side dish with butter. By the time of the American Revolution, tea was drunk everywhere from the backwoods to the cities.

The view of tea in American culture began to shift when the British government introduced the Townshend Acts in 1767. Tea was taxed as part of these laws which made it less affordable for the colonial population. However, cheaper tea was still smuggled into America. Later in 1773 the Tea Act was put into place which allowed the East India Company (EIC) to gain a monopoly on tea sales in America by being able to sell tea at prices that were cheaper than both the colonial tea importers and smugglers. This infuriated American colonists and led to the Boston Tea Party, where 90,000 pounds of EIC tea were dumped into the Boston Harbor. As news spread, tea was destroyed throughout the colonies. In Greenwich New Jersey for example, chests of tea were burned in Market Square.

As a consequence of these acts and the American revolution (1765–1791), tea drinking became seen as unpatriotic. One article in the Boston Gazette on 15 August, 1768 stated: “Let us abjure the poisonous baneful plant and its odious infusion – poisonous and odious, I mean, not on account of its physical qualities but on account of the political diseases and death that are connected with every particle of it.” Boycotts of tea by revolutionary patriots led to an increase in consumption of other beverages, such as coffee, yaupon tea, or herbal teas infused with peppermint, sage or dandelions.

In spite of the distaste for tea that was fueled by the revolution, tea continued to be used by Americans, especially after the war. For example, George Washington regularly had tea for breakfast and dinner, in the English fashion. American merchants Samuel Shaw and Robert Morris sent the first merchant ship to China (the Empress of China) and soon Chinese tea was being shipped to America by American merchant vessels.

=== From the 19th century to today ===
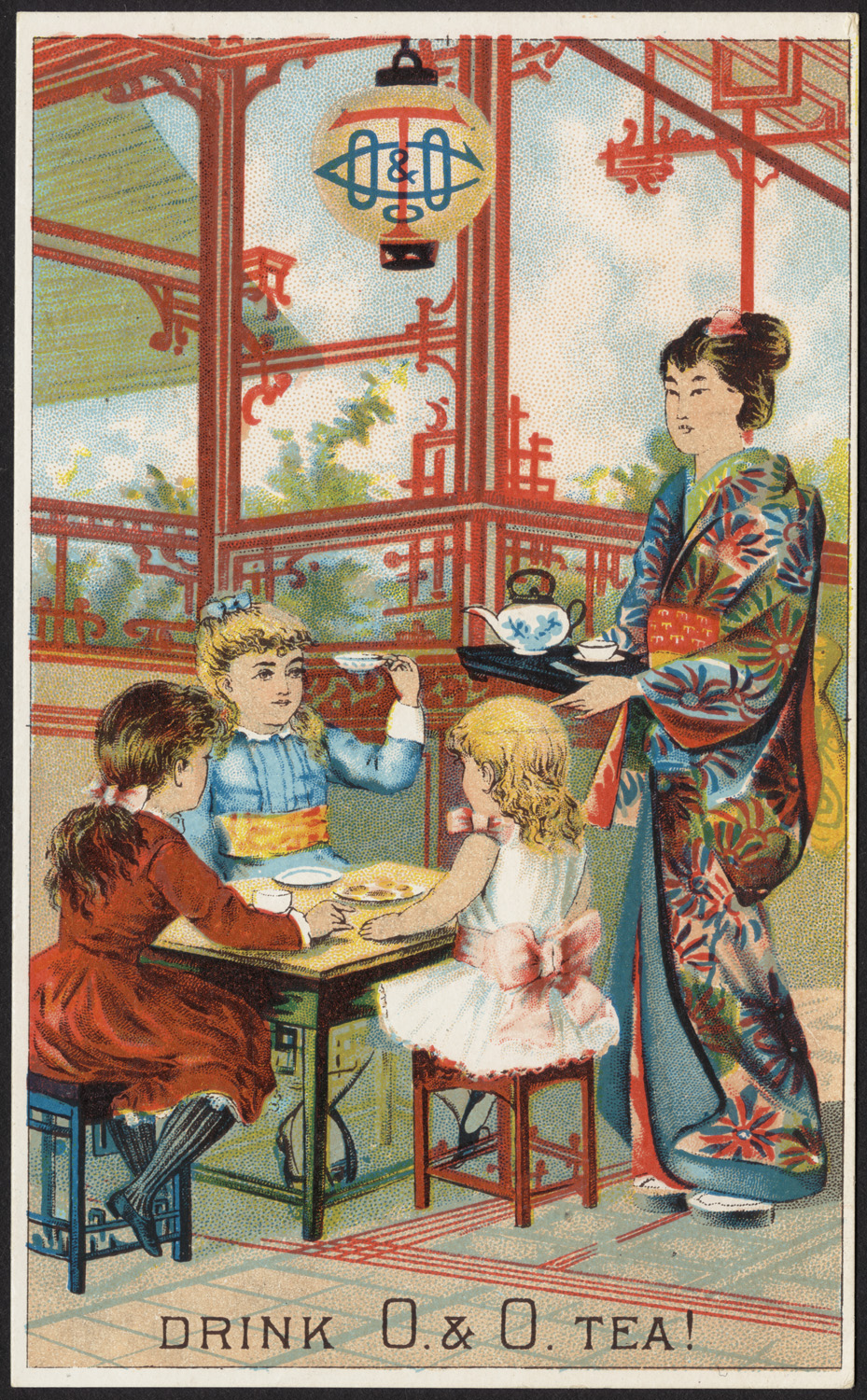
An advertising card for the Oriental & Occidental Tea Company, c. 1870–1900

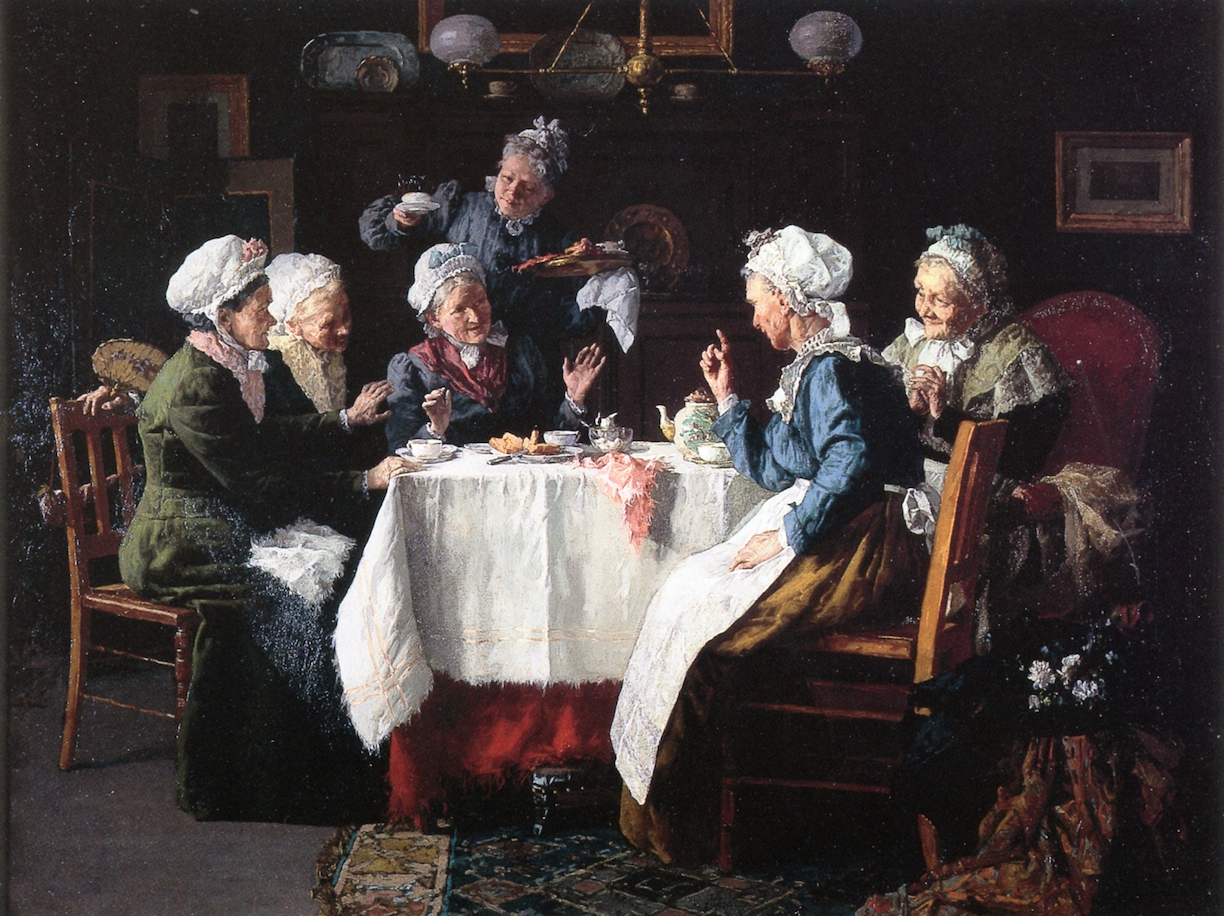
Tea Party (1905) by American genre painter Louis Charles Moeller

After Commodore Perry opened up trade with Japan in 1854, Japanese green tea became the bulk of America’s tea imports. The 19th century saw the rise of iced tea, especially in the South. One of the earliest recipes for American iced tea appeared in Housekeeping in Old Virginia, a cookbook from 1879. It stated: “After scalding the teapot, put into it one quart of boiling water and two teaspoonfuls of green tea. ... Fill the goblets with ice and sugar. A squeeze of lemon will make this delicious and healthful, as it will correct the astringent tendency.”

Alcoholic iced tea punches with cream, sugar, and liquor also became popular in the 19th century, especially in southern towns like Charleston and Savannah. These iced tea drinks resemble the modern Sweet bourbon punch and Long Island iced tea. Fish house punch was often also diluted with tea. The 19th century also saw the growth of various tea companies, like The Great American Tea Company, later renamed The Great Atlantic & Pacific (A&P) and the Oriental & Occidental Tea Company.

During the hot days of the 1904 World's Fair in St. Louis, iced tea became the most popular drink at the fair among its 20 million visitors. This was a major moment in the rise in popularity of American iced tea. Prohibition (1920–1933) saw the rise of non-alcoholic iced teas, as clubs, hotels and other venues sought to re-stock their drink menus with other strong flavorful drinks. The introduction of the home refrigerator (1920s and '30s) also made it much easier for iced tea to be made at home.

Until World War II, Americans drank equal amounts of green tea and black tea. The war cut off green tea shipments from China and Japan, so Americans turned to the mostly black tea traded by the British Empire from India and Sri Lanka. After the war, 99 percent of the tea in America was black.

The American specialty tea market has quadrupled in the years from 1993 to 2008, now being worth $6.8 billion a year. Specialty tea houses and retailers also started to pop up during this period.

== U.S. tea traditions ==
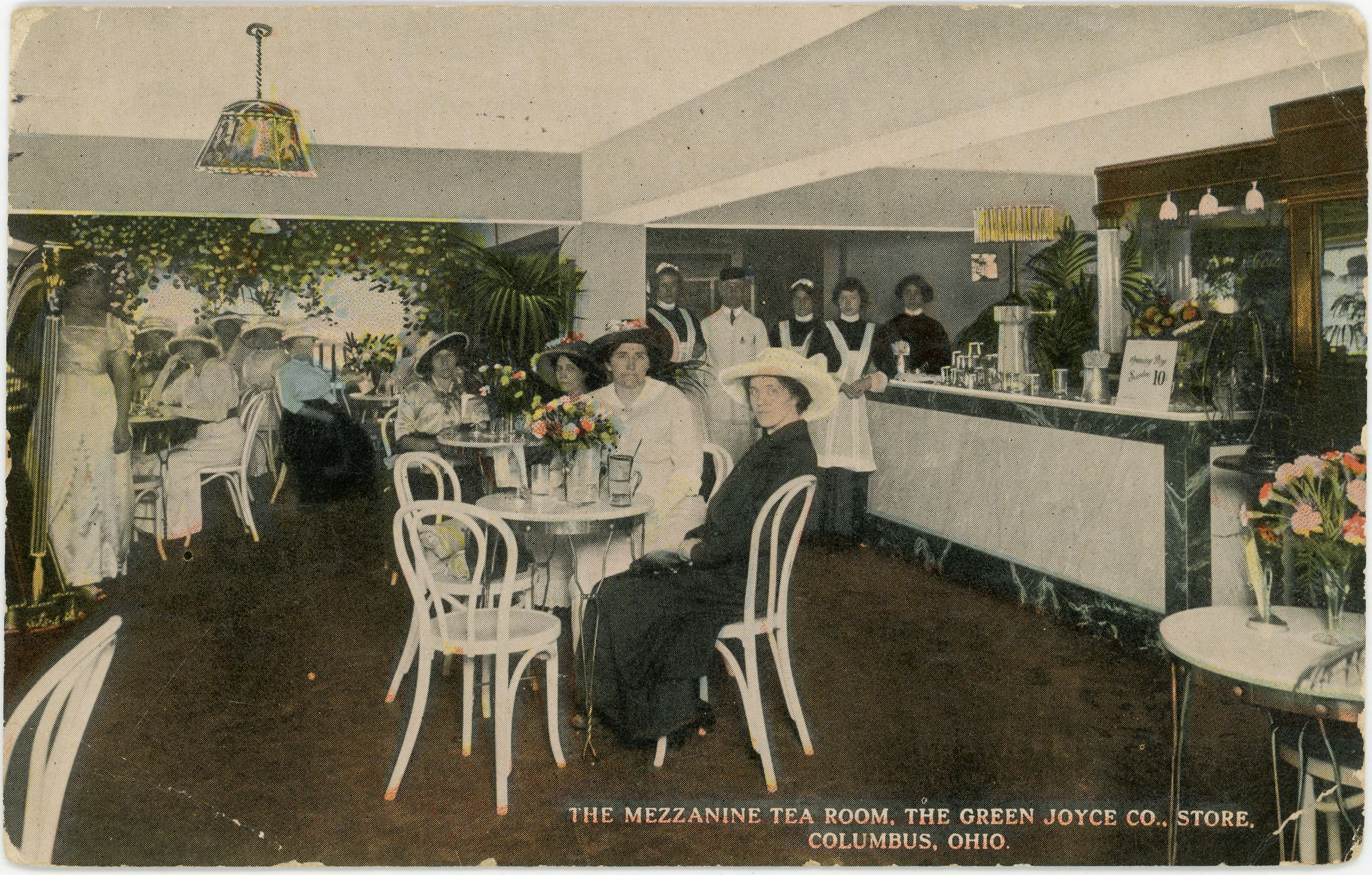
Mezzanine Tea Room, the Green Joyce Company Store, Columbus, Ohio, 1913

=== Iced sweet tea ===
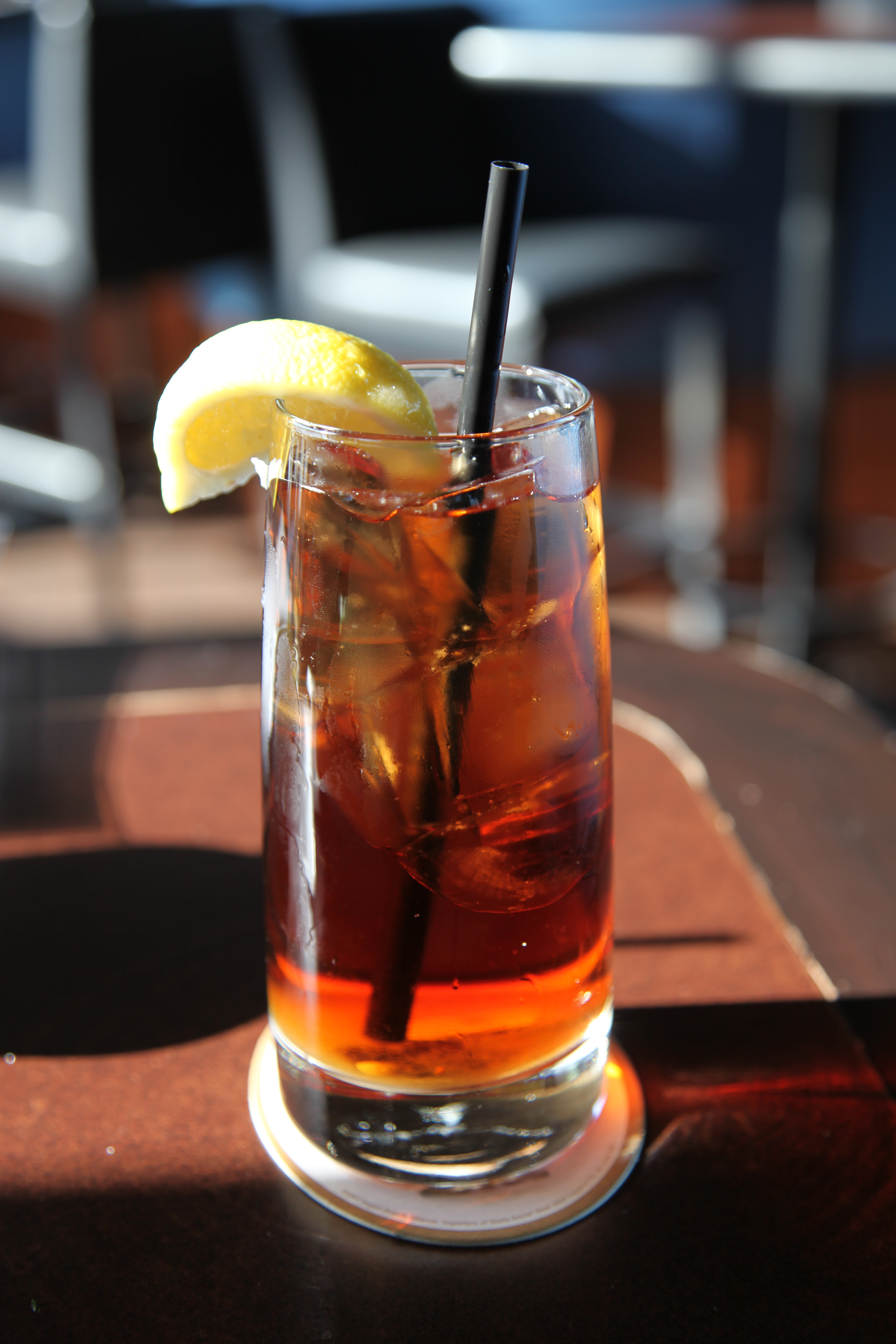
Iced tea, popular throughout the U.S.

Sweet tea, with sugar added (usually while the tea is still hot from brewing), the mixture then being cooled with ice, is ubiquitous in the Southeastern United States. In these states, when "tea" is mentioned, it usually refers to sweetened iced tea. The unsweetened variant is often called "unsweet" tea instead of unsweetened or plain. The consumption of sweet tea with many meals leads to it sometimes called the "table wine of the South", and this trait is considered an important marker of the culture of the Southern United States. Southern sweet tea is made by brewing tea at double strength, adding a large amount of sugar to the freshly brewed hot tea, and diluting to the proper strength. It is served over a glass full of ice cubes and is often garnished with a slice of lemon. While high fructose corn syrup is commonly used as a sweetener for commercially manufactured tea, more often consumers are unaware of this, and when made at home, refined sugar is used.

Other forms of iced sweet tea popular in the United States include iced tea with lemonade (commonly called an Arnold Palmer), iced tea lattes (with cow's milk or plant based milk), Bubble tea, and iced tea with some fruit flavoring. Some venues serve iced tea that has been pre-flavored with fruit essences, like passion fruit or peach.

Iced tea is often prepared from bagged tea. In addition to tea bags and loose tea, powdered "instant iced tea mix" is available in stores. This is made by preparing tea and then dehydrating it, similar to instant coffee. Iced tea can be purchased, like soda, in canned or bottled form at vending machines and convenience stores; usually, this pre-made tea is sweetened with corn syrup, and sometimes some other flavoring, such as lemon or raspberry, is added. Also, like other soft drinks, it can be purchased as a fountain drink, though in some establishments it is pumped from a bag-in-box, and in others, it is simply poured from a separate container that contains freshly brewed tea.

In restaurants, iced tea is usually served unsweetened except in the Southeastern United States where iced tea is much more common and is available both sweet and unsweetened and "iced tea" is often considered to be "sweet tea" unless otherwise specified. The reason for the pre-sweetening is that it may be difficult to dissolve sugar in iced tea, even with constant stirring. The result can be insufficiently sweetened tea or gritty, undissolved sugar crystals in the tea. In the Northern United States and the Western United States, "tea" generally means the hot beverage and iced tea is referred to by name.

Iced tea's popularity in the United States has led to an addition to standard cutlery sets; the iced tea spoon is a standard flatware teaspoon, but with a long handle, suitable for stirring sugar into the taller glasses commonly used for iced tea.

=== Tea parties ===
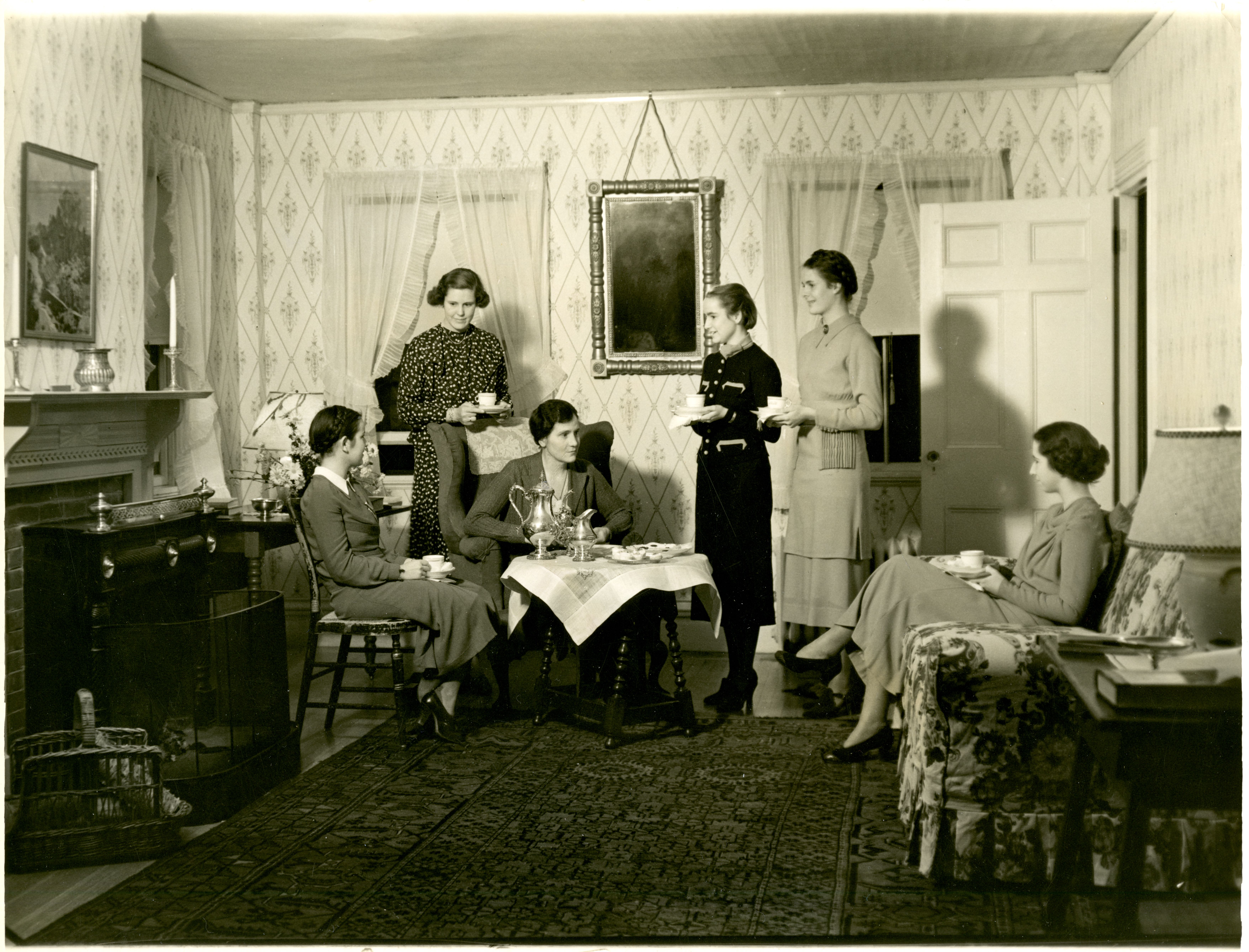
Tea at Abbot Academy, a women's boarding school in Massachusetts

Formal tea parties, practiced in a similar way as in British tea culture, was a popular social event for the American upper classes in the 19th century, especially among women. It included fancy tea sets, along with finger foods and sweets. Formal tea parties were traditionally hosted by women as a way to socialize and display their hospitality and refinement.

=== Sun tea ===
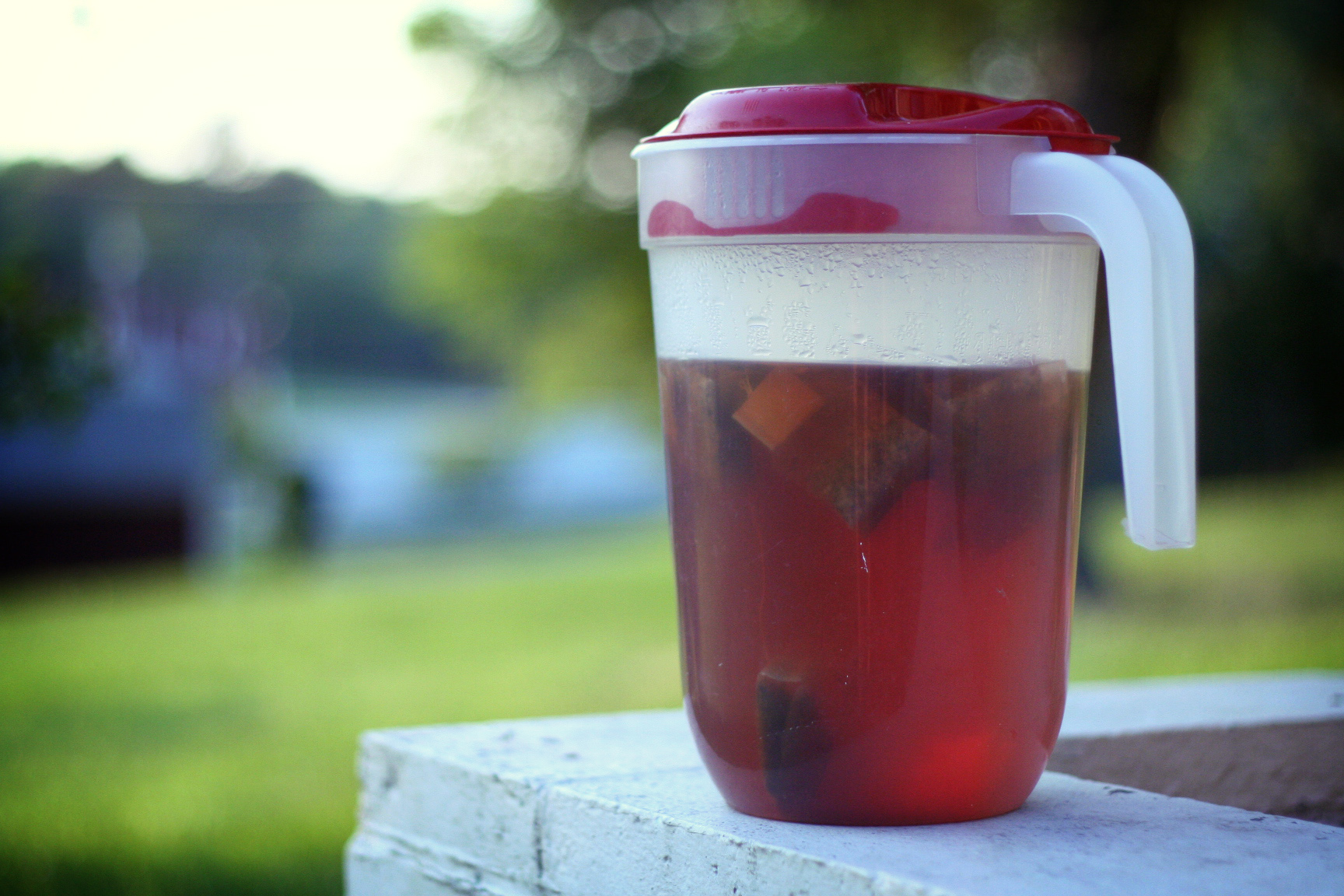
Sun tea brewing

Sun tea is frequently brewed in temperate areas by placing tea and room-temperature water together in a glass jar left outdoors in direct sunlight. Steeping times are necessarily long, two to four hours. Tea may also be brewed with no heat at all by simply immersing the tea bags or infuser in room-temperature water and allowing a period of several hours (typically overnight) for steeping. Since sun brewing occurs in a temperature range that can promote the development of bacteria, particularly Alcaligenes viscolactis, the Centers for Disease Control and the Tea Association of the U.S.A. Inc. suggest storing sun-brewed tea in the refrigerator and discarding it after 24 hours.

== Tea bags ==
Roberta Lawson and Mary McLaren were given the patent for the tea bag.

Be it known that we, Roberta C. Lawson and Mary McLaren, citizens of the united states, residing at Milwaukee, WI have invented a new and useful Improvement in Tea-Leaf Holders, of which the following is a description, reference being had to the accompanying drawings, which are a part of this specification.

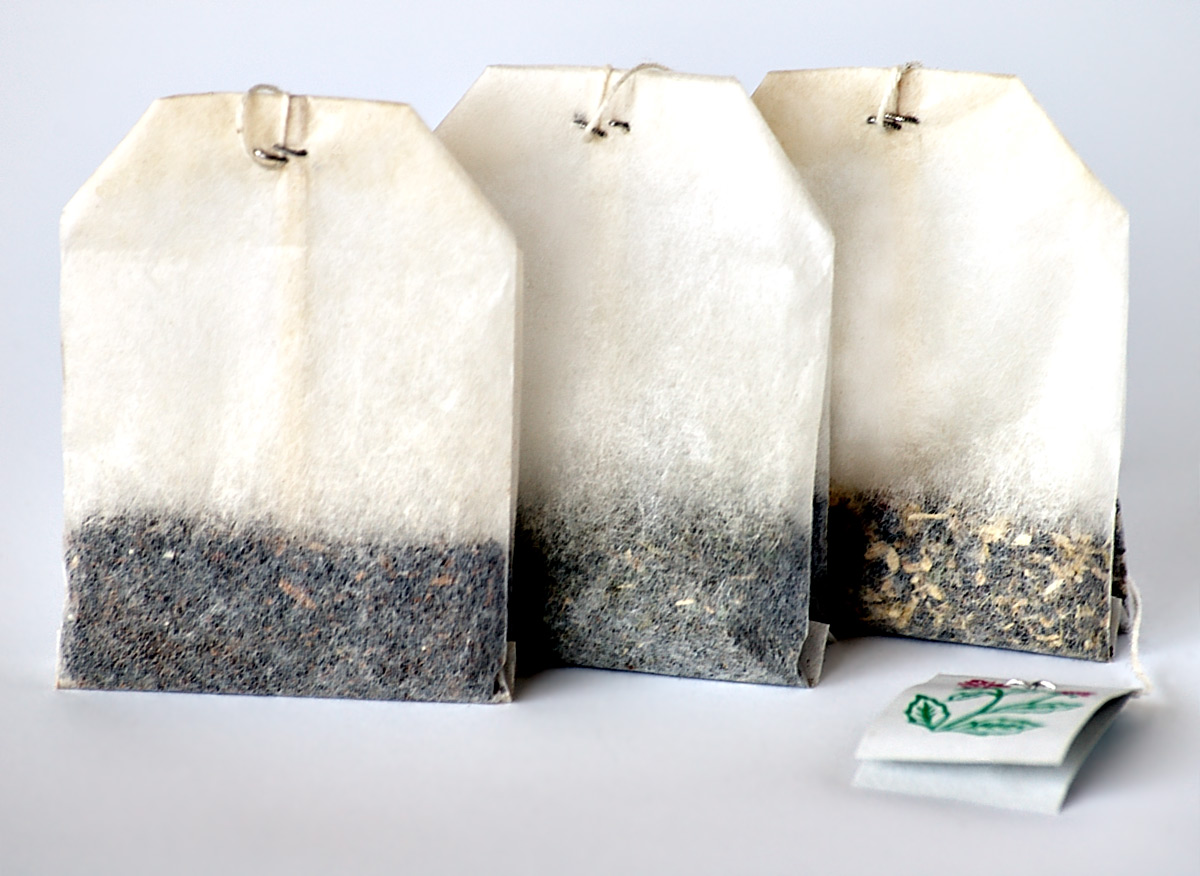
Tea bags were invented in the United States.

Thomas Sullivan is credited with inventing tea bags in 1908. Sullivan, a New York tea importer, inadvertently invented tea bags when he sent tea samples to clients in small silk bags to cut costs, and they mistakenly steeped the bags whole.

The customers were more interested in the brewing convenience of the novel silk bags than his bulk teas. Sullivan did not realize this until they all started to complain that the orders they received were not in the same small bags the samples had been in. Silk was too expensive for everyday disposal; therefore, he invented tea bags made of gauze. The tea bag made of paper fiber was a later American invention.

The nylon pyramidal tea bag containing broken teas and semi-leaf teas made an appearance in the marketplace for aficionados. The pyramidal shape - it is said - allows more room for the leaf to steep. Environmentalists prefer silk to nylon because of the health and biodegradability issues.

Most tea sold in the United States is sold in bags, although loose leaf teas and iced are also available.

== Instant tea ==
In 1946, Nestle USA introduced the first instant tea, Nestea. Instant teas are produced from black tea by extracting the liquor from processed portion of tea typically from offgrade black teas; green tea in a smaller proportion has traditionally been used by the instant tea makers as a "clarification agent" - again, in effort to maximize the clarity of color and minimize off-colors created by certain teas that cloud. The extract is concentrated under low pressure, and drying the concentrate to a powder by freeze-drying, spray-drying, or vacuum-drying. Low temperatures tend to be used to minimize loss of flavor. The American market for instant tea powders, which developed quickly following Nestle's introduction, has slackened off considerably over the past quarter century, as Americans have more and more turned to naturally icing their favorite loose teas, as well as preparing iced tea from tea bags, and to ready-to-drink iced teas where the smaller sizes are found in the supermarkets' refrigerated drinks sections and the larger gallon sizes are found in the supermarkets' non-refrigerated drinks sections.

== Revival of fine teas ==
Yellow and white teas became difficult to find in the United States and even green tea had become uncommon because of the People's Republic of China's ban on exports to the U.S. After the ban was lifted in 1971, these teas typical to China re-entered the American market for the first time since the first two decades of the 20th century.

In the early 1980s, a mini-revival of demand for better quality teas from all origins occurred in the United States. Prior to this time, much of the tea available in 20th century U.S. was blended specifically for gallon and half-gallon sized iced tea bags, with the quality of not "creaming down" (a creamy looking color that imparts to some teas after cooling down) when iced as a needed aspect; "clear-liquoring" teas were required.

Most iced tea blends in the U.S. have traditionally been made from the teas of Indonesia, Sri Lanka, Kenya, Argentina and Malawi.

A recent rise in the demand for orthodox tea in both gallon and half-gallon iced tea bags, as well as 500 and 1,000 gram loose tea packs has caused manufacturers to reinstate orthodox manufacturing methods. This is a departure from the more common Sri Lankan, Indonesian, Argentinian and other nations' orthodox rotorvane tea-making method which has limitations and can not produce whole leaf black tea. The rotorvane method was adopted primarily to satisfy the demand for the smaller leaf sizes that fit into small (1-2 gram) tea bag blends worldwide starting in the early 20th century.

=== Varieties of teas ===
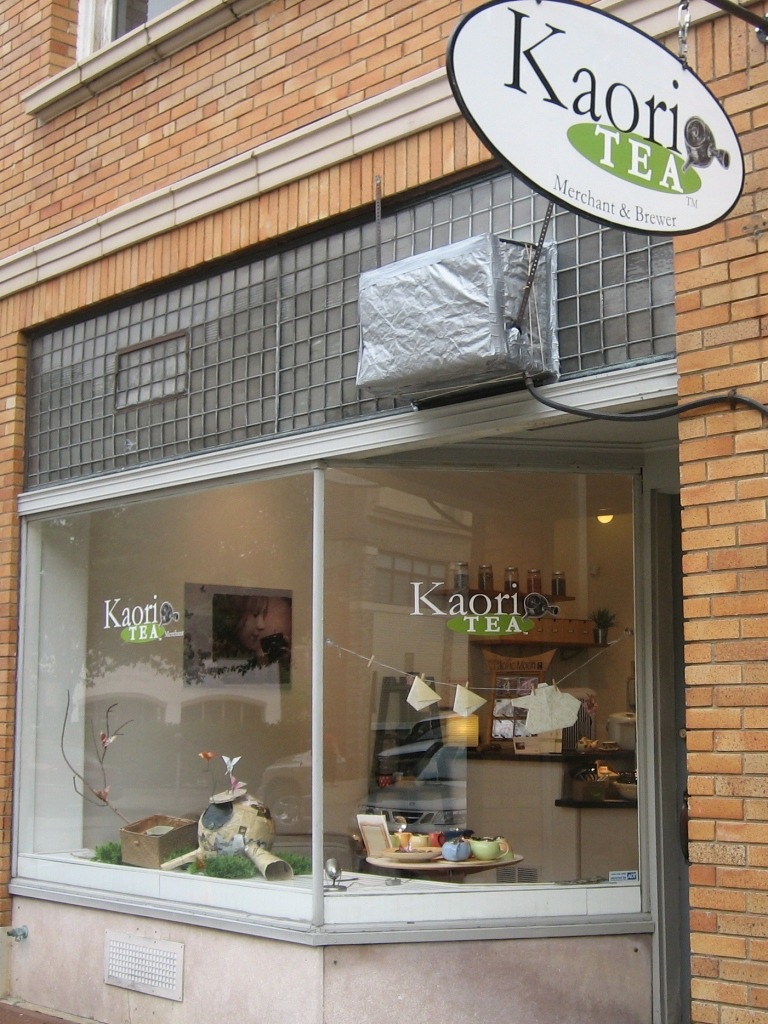
A tea shop in Covington, Kentucky, selling and serving whole leaf bulk teas and teaware, 2007

Currently, there is a revival of interest in the many varieties of black teas throughout the United States. Additionally, other exotic teas (such as the vast variety of African, Asian and South American teas) and different brewing styles are becoming more commonplace. Teas from all origins and elevations, made in all methods of manufacture, are popular in the United States, a tea market which has traditionally been more flexible and willing to try new types of drinks than tea markets throughout the old world.

Decaffeinated tea is widely available in the United States, for those who wish to reduce the physiological effects of caffeine. There are many who are aware that the sales trend for decaf teas in the United States has shown a decreasing curve in demand at retail over the past 20 years, yet the high price of decaf remains unchanged. The reasons are twofold.

Not only is decaf tea more expensive than non-decaf tea, the processes of decaffeinating that is commonly used depletes a great deal of the flavor out of the tea. The teas with the highest caffeine content fall far below the coffees with the lowest caffeine content.

== Gallery ==
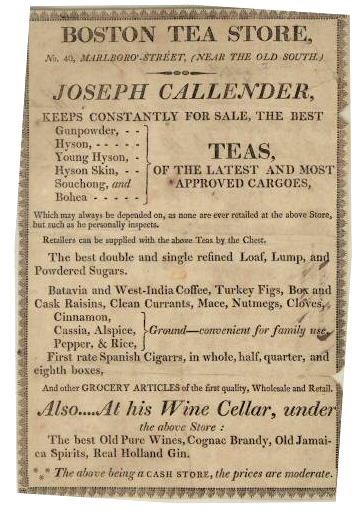
Advertisement of a Boston tea shop in 1811 listing teas for sale

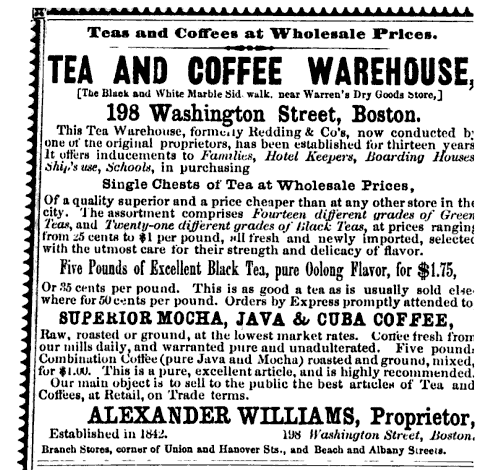
Tea & coffee warehouse advertisement listing teas for sale in the Boston Almanac, 1856, described as a 13-year-old business supplying "families, hotel keepers, boarding houses, ship's use, and schools"

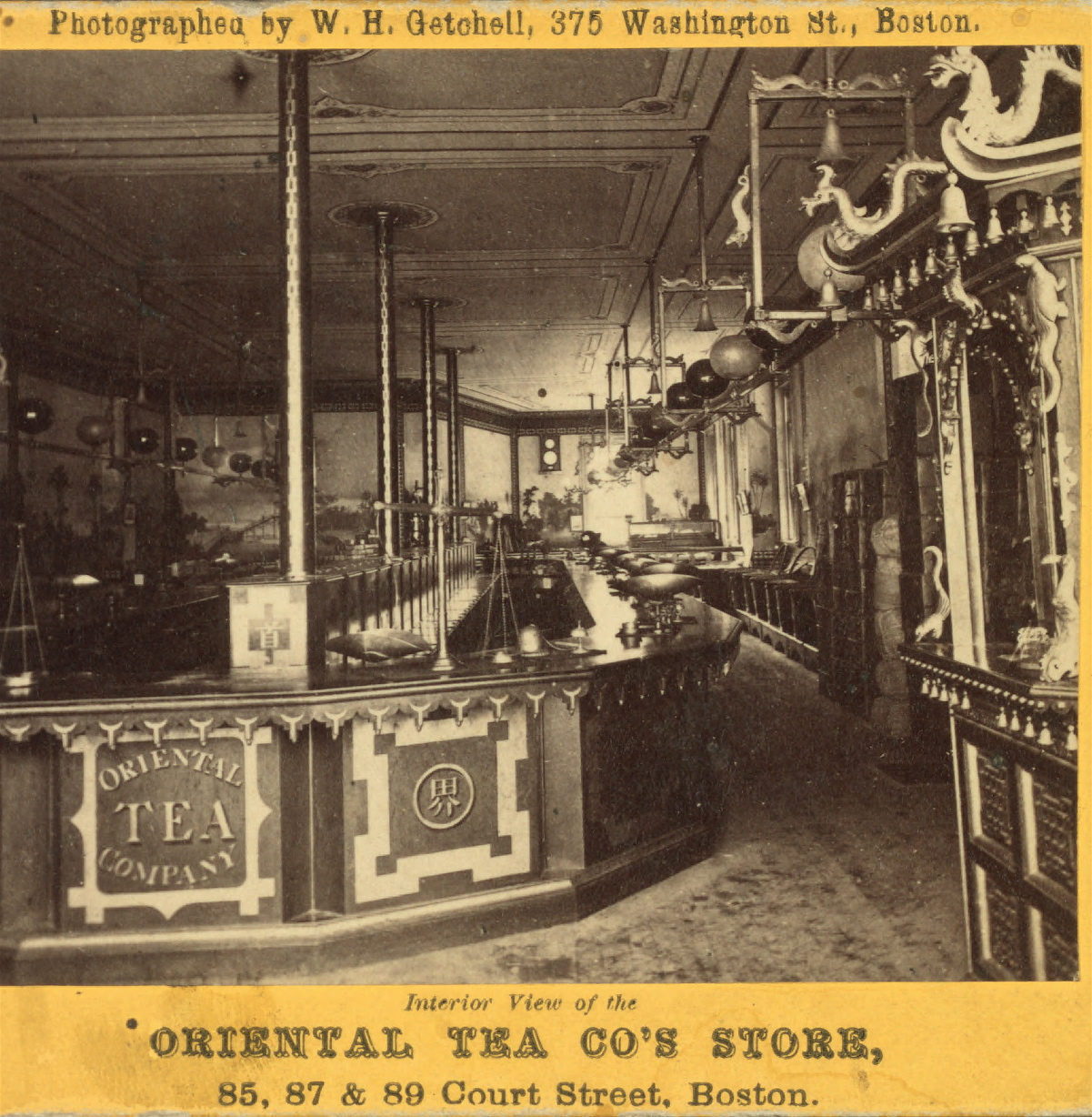
Interior view of the Oriental Tea Company store of Boston, 1800s

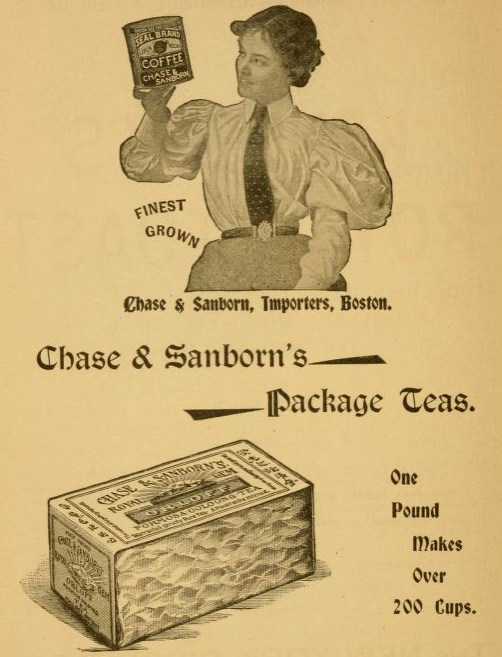
In this advertisement from 1897, Chase & Sanborn, a Boston company that claims to be the first to can coffee, also dealt in imported tea, here a packaged tea from Formosa is shown

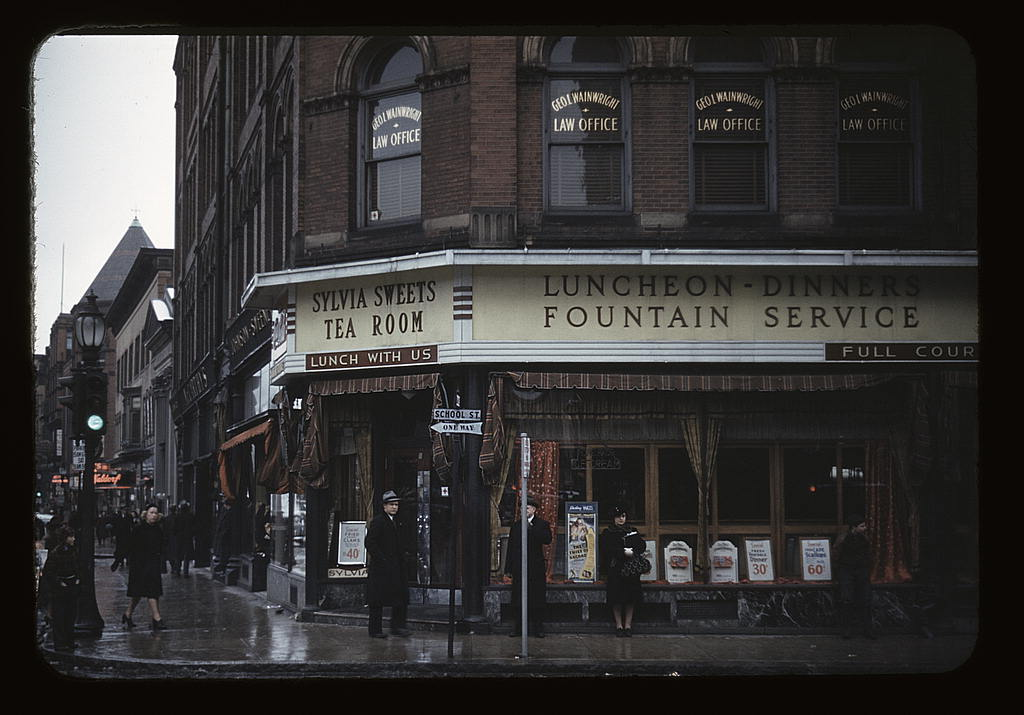
Sylvia Sweets Tea Room, corner of School and Main streets, Brockton, Massachusetts, 1940–41

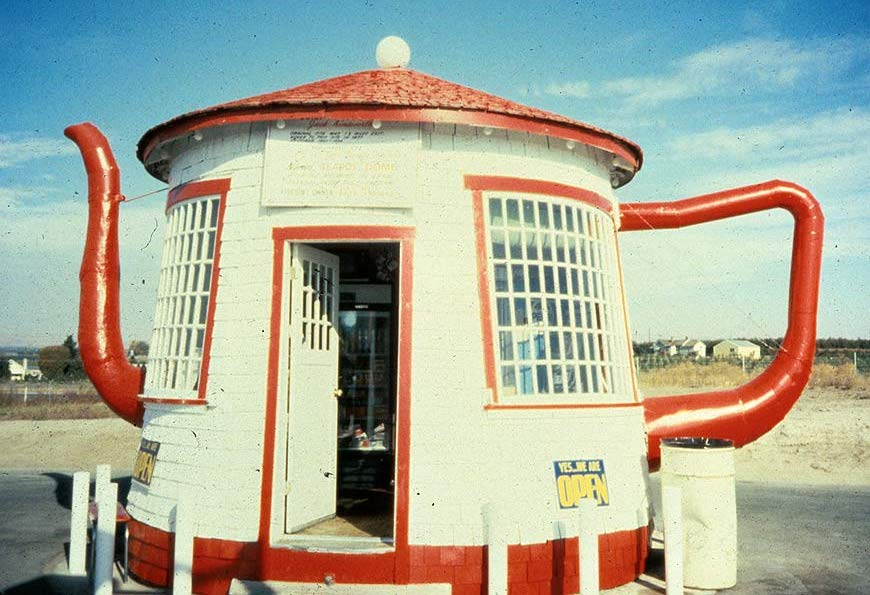
This American teapot shaped building was built next to a highway in 1922 as a political symbol of the Teapot Dome scandal.

== In popular culture ==
=== Architecture ===
- Chester teapot, a teapot-shaped building made in 1938, and billed as "world's largest" to represent a local pottery industry

=== Idioms ===
- "Not my cup of tea" (not one's choice or preference)
- "Tea" and "Spilling the tea" is used to refer to salacious or personal information or gossip in African American Vernacular English. Theories regarding the origin of the term vary, with one popular theory being that it originates from the practice of confiding with close friends at tea parties, a common practice in the American South.

=== Museums and tea farms ===
- Charleston Tea Garden, owned by the Bigelow Tea Company
- Finger Lakes Tea Company in upstate New York
- East Texas Tea Company in Mount Vernon, Texas started tea cultivation in 2009
- Atealier (formerly East Texas Tea Company) in Coeur d'Alene, Idaho
- The Great Mississippi Tea Company in Brookhaven, Mississippi
- Minto Island Tea Farm, Oregon
- Sparta Teapot Museum, a former American museum of more than 6,000 teapots, closed a few years after a funding controversy

=== Music ===
- "I'm a Little Teapot" (formally titled "The Teapot Song"), a children's song from 1939 and a related dance
- My Cup of Tea
- "Tea for Two" (song), a song from the 1925 musical No, No, Nanette

== See also ==
- Argo Tea, Chicago based chain of tea cafés
- Bigelow Tea Company, founded in 1945 in Connecticut with a tea blended with orange and spices, family owned
- Celestial Seasonings, a pioneering American herbal tea company founded in Colorado, 1969
- English breakfast tea, named by an English-American tea merchant in 1843 in New York City
- The Great Atlantic & Pacific Tea Company, began in 1859 as a tea and coffee dealer in New York; also known as the giant supermarket chain "A&P"
- List of tea companies#United States
- Luzianne, a Louisiana-based tea company that introduced an iced tea blend in 1932
- Lynchburg lemonade, a cocktail and long drink
- Salada tea, a tea company founded in Montreal, that built a headquarters in Boston in 1917
- Snapple, an American brand of tea and juice drinks which is owned by Dr Pepper Snapple Group and based in Plano, Texas
- Tea production in the United States
- Teahouse

== Bibliography ==
- Griffiths, John (2011). Tea: A History of the Drink that Changed the World. London: Carlton Publishing. pp. 16,18,63, 78–79, 106.
- Hale, Sarah Josepha Buell (1841). Early American Cookery. Boston: The Good Housekeeper. p. 112.
- Heiss, M.L and Heiss, R.J. (2007). The Story of Tea: A cultural history and drinking guide. Berkeley, CA: 10 Speed Press. p. 80.
- Mair, Victor and Hoh, Erling (2009). The true history of tea. New York: Thames and Hudson. p. 201.
- Stern, Tracy (2007). Tea Party: 20 Themed Tea parties with recipes for every occasion, from fabulous showers to intimate gatherings. New York: Random House. pp. 12–18.
