= Teapot Dome (disambiguation) =

The Teapot Dome scandal was a bribery incident in the United States that took place during the administration of President Warren G. Harding.

Teapot Dome may also refer to:

- Teapot Rock, a rock formation in Natrona County, Wyoming, associated with the scandal
- Teapot Dome Service Station, a former service station in Zillah, Washington, listed on the National Register of Historic Places

== See also ==
- Teapot (disambiguation)
