= Teapot (disambiguation) =

A teapot is a vessel for brewing or serving tea.

Teapot also may refer to:

== Teapots ==
- Brown Betty, a British type of teapot
- Cube teapot, a British nautical teapot
- Kyūsu, a Japanese type of teapot
- Yixing clay teapot, a Chinese type of teapot
- Tetsubin teapot, a Japanese pot for boiling water for tea

== American politics ==
- Teapot Dome scandal, a bribery scandal (1921–1923)
  - Teapot Rock or Teapot Dome, oilfield at the center of the scandal
- TeaPot Party, an advocacy group formed by Willie Nelson

== Computing ==
- Utah teapot (1975), an iconic model used in early 3D computer graphics
- I'm a teapot, a gag code (#418) in the HTML client errors status codes

== Buildings and museums ==
- Chester teapot, a teapot-shaped novelty building in West Virginia
- Teapot Dome Service Station, a teapot-shaped novelty building in Washington State
- Teapot Island, a teapot museum in Kent
- Sihai Teapot Museum, a teapot museum in Shanghai
- Sparta Teapot Museum, a teapot museum in North Carolina

== Music, art, and literature ==
- "The Teapot" (1863), a story by Hans Christian Andersen
- "I'm a Little Teapot" (1939), an American popular song
- Teapot Industries, an Italian indie rock band

== Other ==
- Teapot (asterism), an astronomical asterism located in the constellation Sagittarius
- Operation Teapot (1955), a series of nuclear tests
- Russell's teapot (1952), a concept in philosophy
- Teapot Committee, codename for the United States Air Force Strategic Missile Evaluation Committee (1953–1954)

== See also ==
- Tea urn, a device for boiling water for tea
- Samovar, a type of tea urn
- Tempest in a teapot
- TPOT (disambiguation)
