= Airplane Service Station =

Gas station in Powell, Tennessee

- U.S. National Register of Historic Places
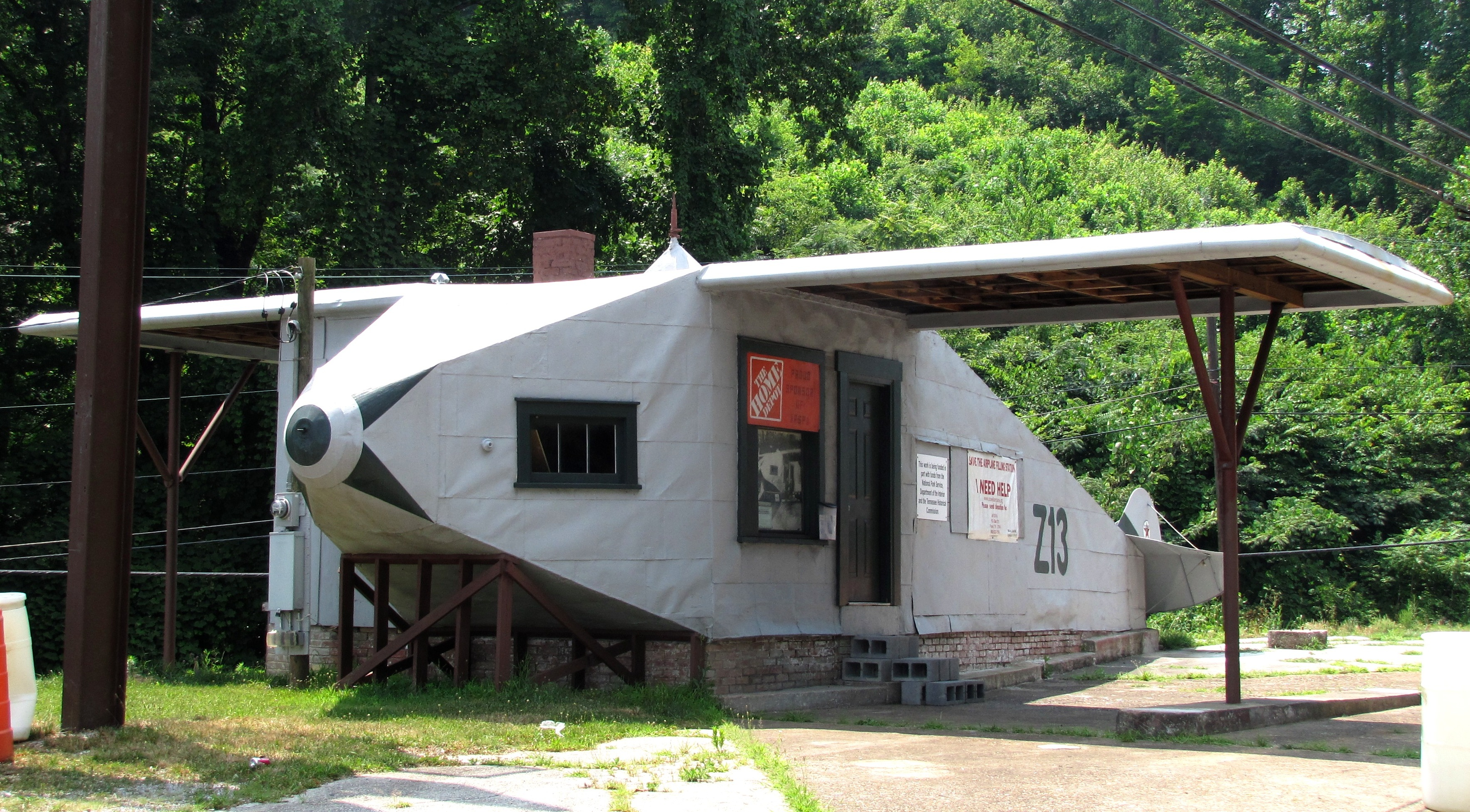

- Location within Tennessee Location within the United States
- Interactive map showing the location for Airplane Service Station
- Location: 6829 Clinton Hwy; Powell, Tennessee
- Nearest city: Knoxville, Tennessee
- Coordinates: 36°0′26″N 84°1′52″W
- Built: 1930
- Architect: Wayne L. Smith, Elmer F. Nickle, Henry C. Nickle
- Architectural style: Mimetic
- NRHP reference No.: 04000198
- Added to NRHP: March 18, 2004

The Airplane Service Station, also known as the Powell Airplane, is a service station built in 1930 in the shape of an airplane. Located on Clinton Highway in Powell, an unincorporated community in Knox County, Tennessee, it is on the National Register of Historic Places.

The station was built by brothers Elmer and Henry Nickle. Their intent was to increase business by having a service station that was visually unique, both to area residents and to travelers on newly widened U.S. Highway 25. Elmer Nickle had a strong interest in airplanes, and so the station was constructed in the Mimetic architectural style in the shape of an airplane.

The structure ceased being used as a service station in the 1960s, when it became a liquor store. It has also been a produce stand, bait and tackle shop, a used car lot and a barber shop. Knox Heritage and a local organization, the Airplane Filling Station Preservation Association (AFSPA), worked to preserve the structure. The building was renovated into a short-term rental residence.

== See also ==
- Teapot Dome Service Station, 1922 Zillah, Washington station built in the shape of a teapot
- Shell Service Station, 1930 Winston-Salem, North Carolina station built in the shape of a scallop shell
