= Weigel's =

Convenience store chain in the East Tennessee region

Weigel's Stores, Inc.

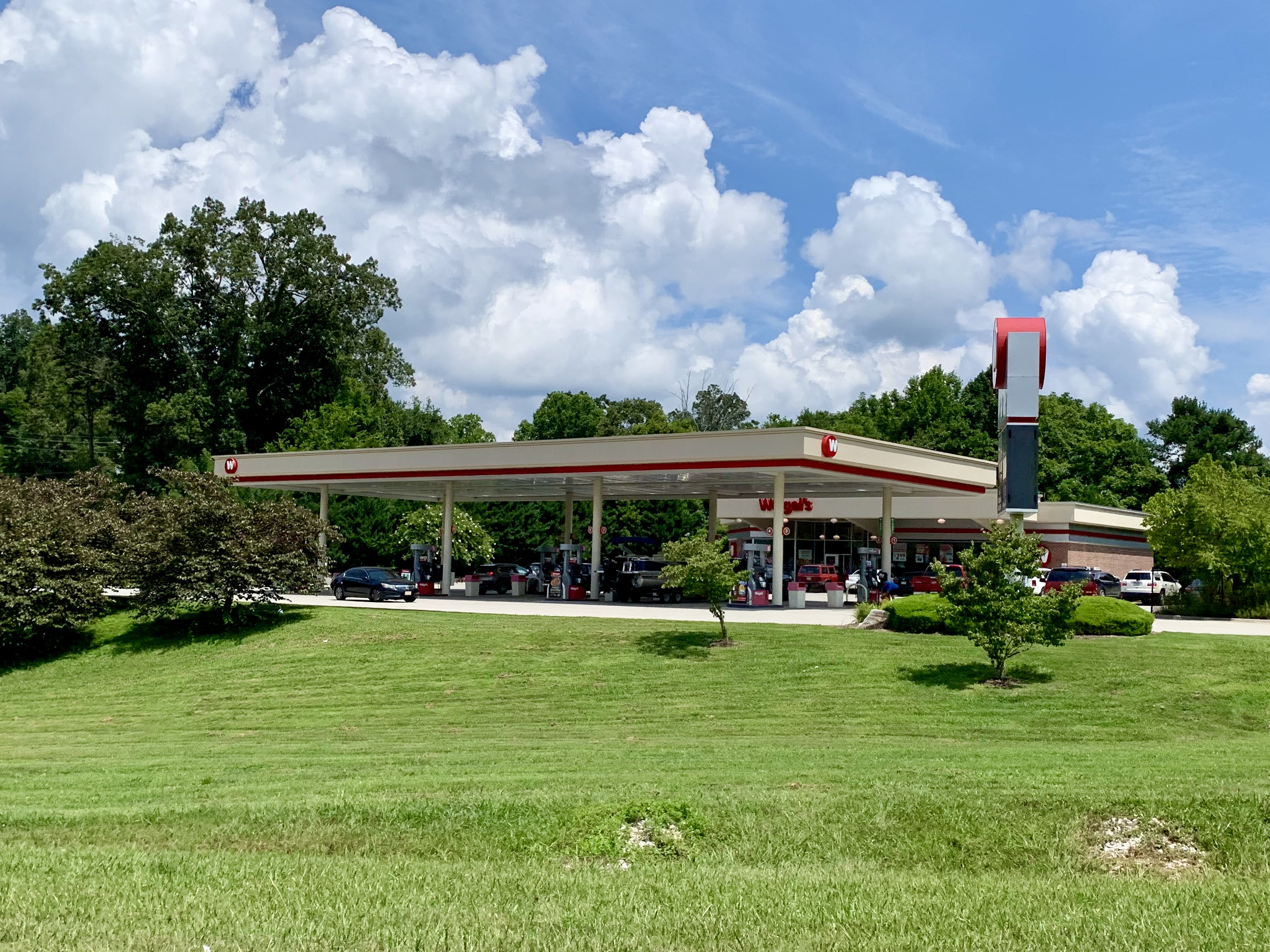
- Weigel's #68 in Morristown, Tennessee
- Trade name: Weigel's
- Type: Private
- Industry: Retail (convenience stores)
- Founded: 1931; 95 years ago
- Founder: Lynn B. and William W. Weigel
- Headquarters: Powell, Tennessee, U.S.
- Number of locations: 88 (2026)
- Area served: East Tennessee
- Products: Coffee; Prepared foods; Gasoline; Beverages; Snacks; Dairy products
- Subsidiaries: Broadacre Dairy Inc; Red Barn Foods LLC
- Website: weigels.com

Weigel's is a convenience store chain based in Powell, Tennessee with 84 locations in the East Tennessee region. They also own and operate Broadacre Dairy Inc, which processes milk, tea, juices, and eggnog for their convenience stores, as well as its own bakery, Red Barn Foods.

== History ==
The Weigel family entered the dairy business in 1931 with a "herd" of four cows on a 600-acre farm selling raw milk in 10-gallon cans. William Weigel Sr. began bottling pasteurized milk in 1935 and the company soon built a home delivery service.

In 1938, management of the operation passed completely to Lynn B. and William W. Weigel, both men having graduated from the University of Tennessee's School of Dairy Science. Lynn was in charge of the office and dairy operations and William was in charge of farm operations and marketing. In 1947, the new plant was modernized, and ice cream and cottage cheese production were added.

Primarily to provide an outlet for their returnable gallon milk jugs and other dairy products, the Weigel brothers opened drive-through stores in East Tennessee. 500-square-foot (46 m^{2}) Store Number 1, on Sanderson Road in Knoxville, Tennessee, opened on December 9, 1958. Current CEO Billy Weigel expanded on that idea when he opened the company's first walk-in milk store, in 1964, which became one of the first convenience stores in Knoxville.

The company opened its own bakery, Red Barn Foods, in 2014. The 12,000-square-foot facility makes daily delivers of donuts, cookies and muffins to Weigel's locations throughout the region. The company is expanding on that fresh concept with Weigel's Kitchens inside some locations.

Between 1999 and 2015, Weigel's invested more than $120 million in new store builds, opening about 40 new and replacement locations.

== Weigel's Milk ==
In 1958, Weigel's introduced its Jug O’Milk brand. All Weigel's milk is produced at the Broadacre Dairy dairy farm in Powell, Tennessee. The milk is cold pasteurized the old-fashioned way, allowing it to retain a natural creamy flavor. Being a small and local dairy, the company's localized supply chain is able to bring the milk from farm-to-store within 24 hours.

Weigel's chocolate milk has won three Tennessee State Fair Blue Ribbon awards.
