= Temple Baptist Academy (Powell) =

Location
- 1700 W Beaver Creek Drive; Powell, Knox, Tennessee; United States
- Coordinates: 36.0249°N 84.0211°W

Information
- Type: Private elementary and secondary Christian school
- Motto: "Take the High Road"
- Religious affiliation: Christian
- Denomination: Baptist
- Established: 1971
- CEEB code: 431902
- NCES School ID: 01296651
- Teaching staff: 17.8
- Grades: K to 12
- Campus: Large suburb
- Accreditation: AdvancED
- Affiliations: AACS
- Website: templebaptistacademy.com

Temple Baptist Academy is a private Christian school located in Powell, Tennessee. It was established in 1971.

In 2022 enrollment was 226 students, from pre-Kindergarten to 12th grade.
