= Zillah High School =

Location
- 1602 Second Avenue; Zillah, Washington; 46°24′02″N 120°14′41″W

Information
- School district: Zillah School District #205
- Superintendent: Doug Burge
- Principal: Jeff Charbonneau
- Teaching staff: 20.49 (FTE)
- Grades: 9th-12th
- Enrollment: 450 (2023-2024)
- Student to teacher ratio: 21.96
- Colors: Orange & Black
- Team name: Leopards
- Website: zhs.zillahschools.org

Zillah High School is a public high school located in Zillah, Washington. It serves 407 students in grades 9–12. 53% of the students are White, while 41% are Hispanic, 3% are American Indian, 1% are Asian, and 1% are Black.
