= Waughtown–Belview Historic District =

Historic district in North Carolina, United States

- Waughtown-Belview Historic District
- U.S. National Register of Historic Places
- U.S. Historic district
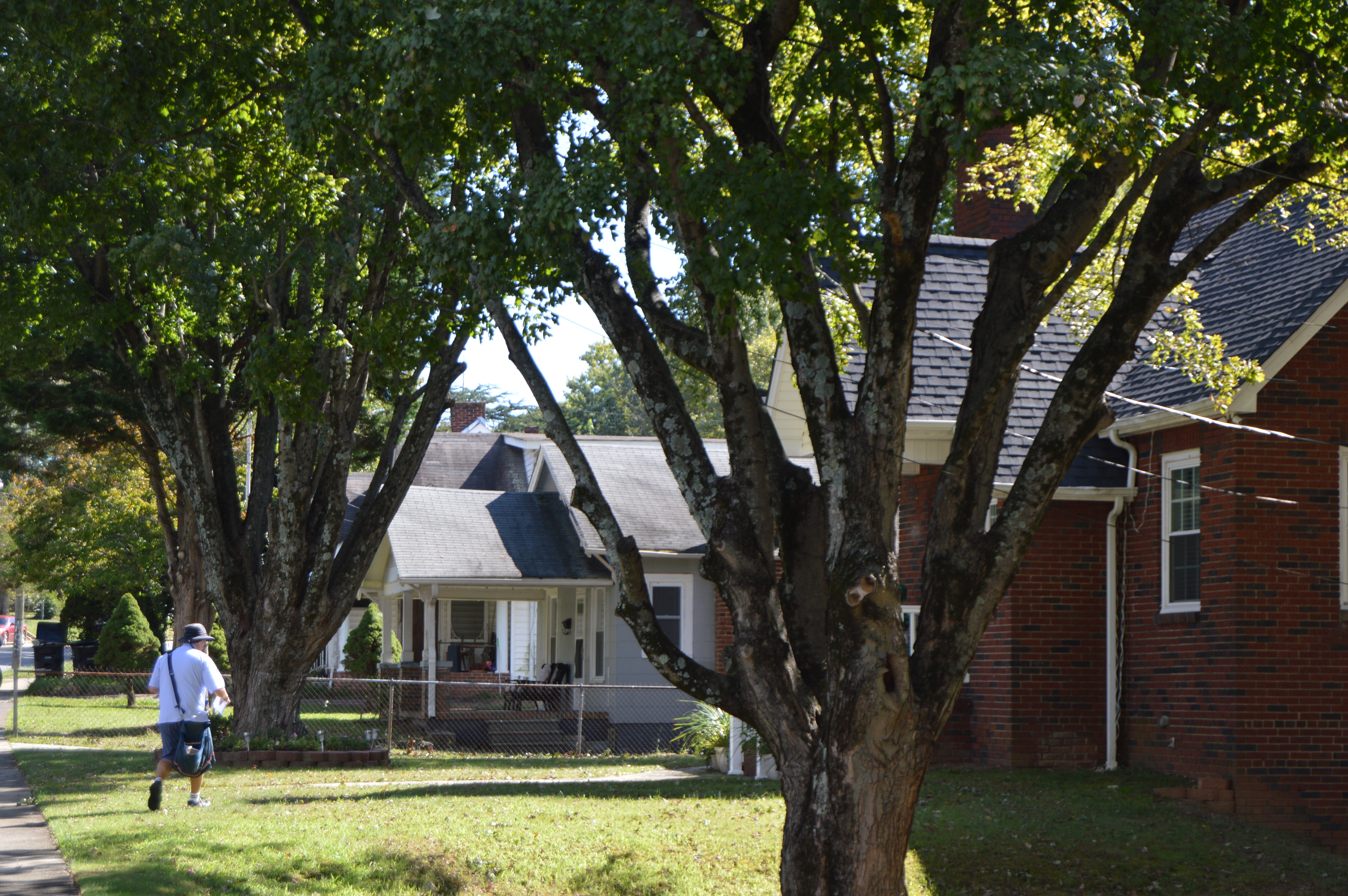
- Houses on Sprague Street

- Location within North Carolina Location within the United States
- Location: Roughly bounded by Dacian, Waughtown St, Bellwauwood, Sprague, Ernest, Goldfloss, and Gilbreath Dr., Winston-Salem, North Carolina
- Coordinates: 36°04′03″N 80°12′42″W
- Area: 460 acres (190 ha)
- Built: 1834
- Architectural style: Greek Revival, Queen Anne, Colonial Revival; Craftsman
- NRHP reference No.: 04001521
- Added to NRHP: January 20, 2005

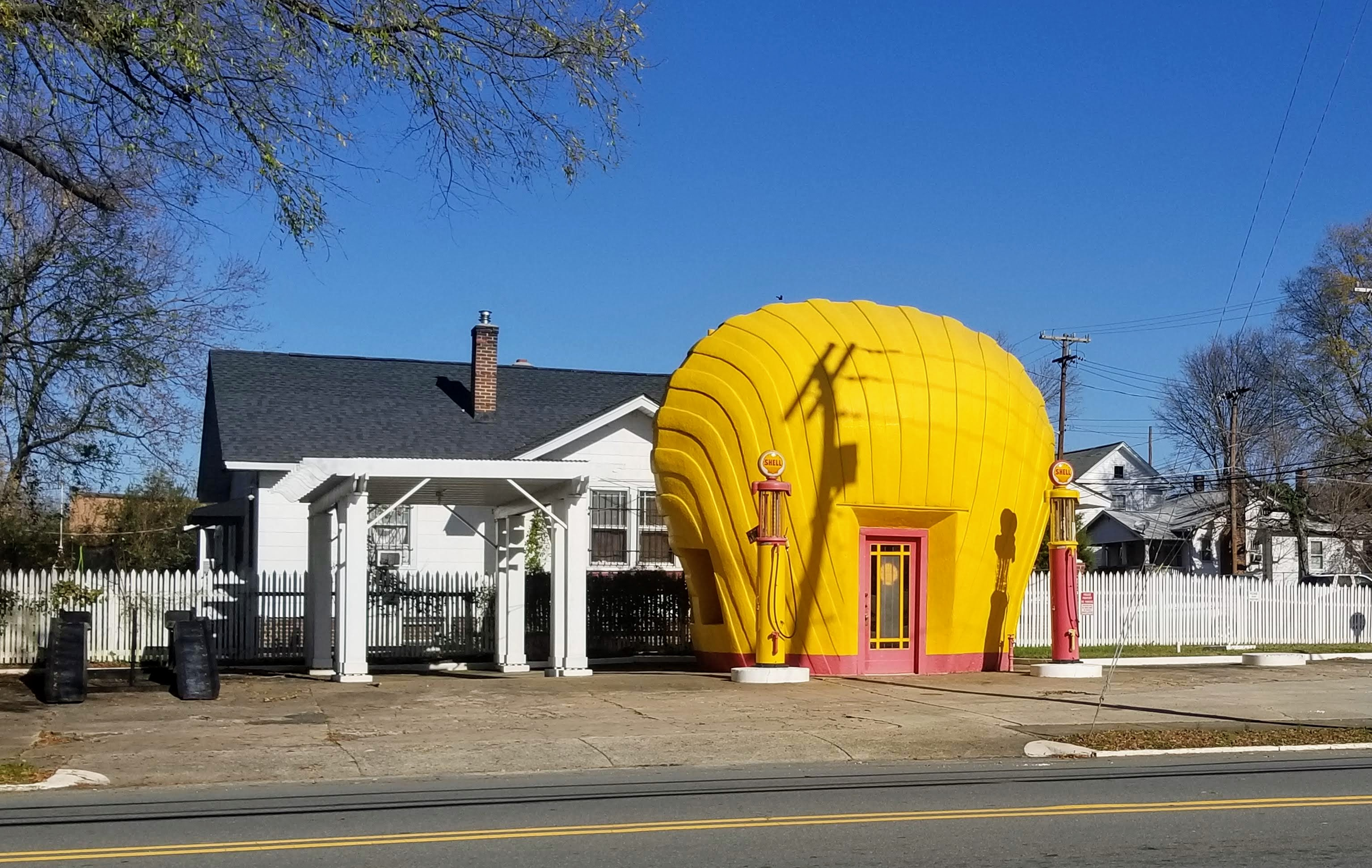
Shell Service Station, 2020

Waughtown–Belview Historic District is a national historic district located at Winston-Salem, Forsyth County, North Carolina. The district encompasses 1,137 contributing buildings, 1 contributing site, and 1 contributing object in a largely residential section of Winston-Salem. The buildings date from about 1834 to 1955, and include notable examples of Greek Revival, Colonial Revival, Queen Anne, and Bungalow / American Craftsman style architecture. Located in the district is the separately listed Shell Service Station. Other notable resources include the Clodfelter House (c. 1850), Fiddler House (c. 1900), Nissen Wagon Works smokestack, Triangle Body Works (c. 1927), Waughtown Baptist Church (1919), Waughtown Presbyterian Church (1914), Southside Christian Church (c. 1915), and Waughtown Cemetery.

It was listed on the National Register of Historic Places in 2005.
