= Zillah School District =

Public school district

Coordinates: 46°24′26″N 120°15′54″W

Zillah School District No. 205 is a public school district in Yakima County, Washington, United States, and serves the town of Zillah.

In May 2013 the district had an enrollment of 1,322. The Zillah School District is is a small rural district of approximately 1250 students, housed in four buildings in the mid-Yakima Valley. Zillah is one of the smallest districts in area in Yakima County (estimated 44 square miles). The estimated population within the school district boundaries is approximately 4,000.

Zillah is a bedroom community to Yakima. Business and industry in our district boundaries are: diversified agriculture (including fruit tree orchards, vineyards, dairies, row crops, forage crops, cattle feed lot, vegetable truck gardening, etc.) and agriculture related service industries including several diversified fruit packing and shipping operations, wineries, agriculture management and consulting, veterinarian, and USDA Soil Conservation Service. The Zillah School District is one of the top three employers in the community.

== Primary schools ==
- Hilton Elementary School houses grades K-3. The current principal is Doug Burge.

== Secondary schools ==
- Zillah Intermediate School built in 1983, holds grades 4–6. The current principal is Paula (Holden) Dasso.
- Middle School is for grades 7–8. ZMS is the newest of the schools. The current principal is Andy Boe.
- Zillah High School (Home of the Leopards) is run by principal Mike Torres and Assistant Principal Rock Winters. It holds grades 9-12.
- Zillah also has an alternative school program (http://www.zillahschools.org/ZAP)

A webpage includes the history of Zillah High School and beginnings of Zillah School District (http://www.zillahschools.org/ZHS/zhshistory.htm).
