= Powell STOLport =

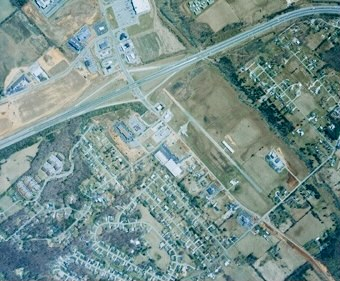
- The airstrip in 2002
- IATA: none; ICAO: none; FAA LID: 9A2

Summary
- Airport type: Private
- Owner: Norman C. Mayes
- Serves: Knoxville, Tennessee
- Location: Powell, Tennessee
- Elevation AMSL: 992 ft / 302 m
- Coordinates: 36°02′40″N 084°00′16″W

Map
- Location of airport in Tennessee

Runways
Direction	Length		Surface
Direction	ft	m	Surface
5/23	2,600	792	Asphalt

Statistics (2000)
- Aircraft operations: 1,375
- Based aircraft: 5
- Source: Federal Aviation Administration

Powell STOLport (FAA LID: 9A2) was a privately owned, public use STOLport in Knox County, Tennessee, United States. It is located five nautical miles (9 km) northwest of the central business district of Knoxville, Tennessee. This facility had a runway designed for use by STOL (short take-off and landing) aircraft.

The airport was annexed by the City of Knoxville in April 2003.

The airport closed in the mid-2000s, and served its final flight in April 2012 when the then-owners sold the last aircraft that had been stored at the facility. It was scheduled to become a shopping center based around a Kroger store.], but as of 2026 all that has materialized is a Kroger and Petsmart.

== Facilities and aircraft ==
Powell STOLport covered an area of 30 acres (12 ha) at an elevation of 992 feet (302 m) above mean sea level. It had one runway designated 5/23 with an asphalt surface measuring 2,600 by 50 feet (792 x 15 m).

For the 12-month period ending February 9, 2000, the airport had 1,375 general aviation aircraft operations, an average of 26 per week. At that time there were 5 aircraft based at this airport: 80% single-engine and 20% multi-engine.
