= Sparta Teapot Museum =

Museum in Sparta, North Carolina

The Sparta Teapot Museum of Craft and Design was a museum in Sparta, North Carolina, United States. It closed in January 2010.

The museum drew mainly from the teapot collection of Gloria and Sonny Kamm. The Kamm Collection, comprising more than 6,000 teapots, is the largest teapot collection in the United States and arguably the world.

The Sparta Teapot Museum received its official 501(c)(3) status from the Internal Revenue Service in November 2005. This designation made the Museum a charity organization.

In 2006, in what was criticized by state Republican legislators as an example of pork barrel spending, the North Carolina legislature controversially appropriated funds construction of a new building for the museum. The project was located in Sparta, North Carolina, in order to attract tourists to an economically distressed area of the state, and was supported by local leaders, many of them Republican.

== See also ==
- American tea culture
- Flagstaff House
- Teapot Dome Service Station, an American building shaped like a teapot, symbolic of the Teapot Dome bribery scandal
