= Alcaligenes viscolactis =

Scientific classification
- Domain: Bacteria
- Kingdom: Pseudomonadati
- Phylum: Pseudomonadota
- Class: Betaproteobacteria
- Order: Burkholderiales
- Family: Alcaligenaceae
- Genus: Alcaligenes
- Species: A. viscolactis

Binomial name
- Alcaligenes viscolactis

Species of bacterium

Alcaligenes viscolactis is a bacterium which can produce ropiness in milk and which can grow in sun tea.
