= TPOT =

TPOT may refer to:

- This Part of Twitter, another name for the postrationalist community
- Tree-based pipeline optimization tool, a computational method developed by Jason H. Moore
- Time per output token, a measure for generative artificial intelligence efficiency, which indicates the service speed users can experience when using a generative language model.
- Battle for Dream Island: The Power of Two, the fifth season of the animated web series Battle for Dream Island

== See also ==
- Teapot
