= Powell, Tennessee =

Powell formerly Powell Station
- CDP
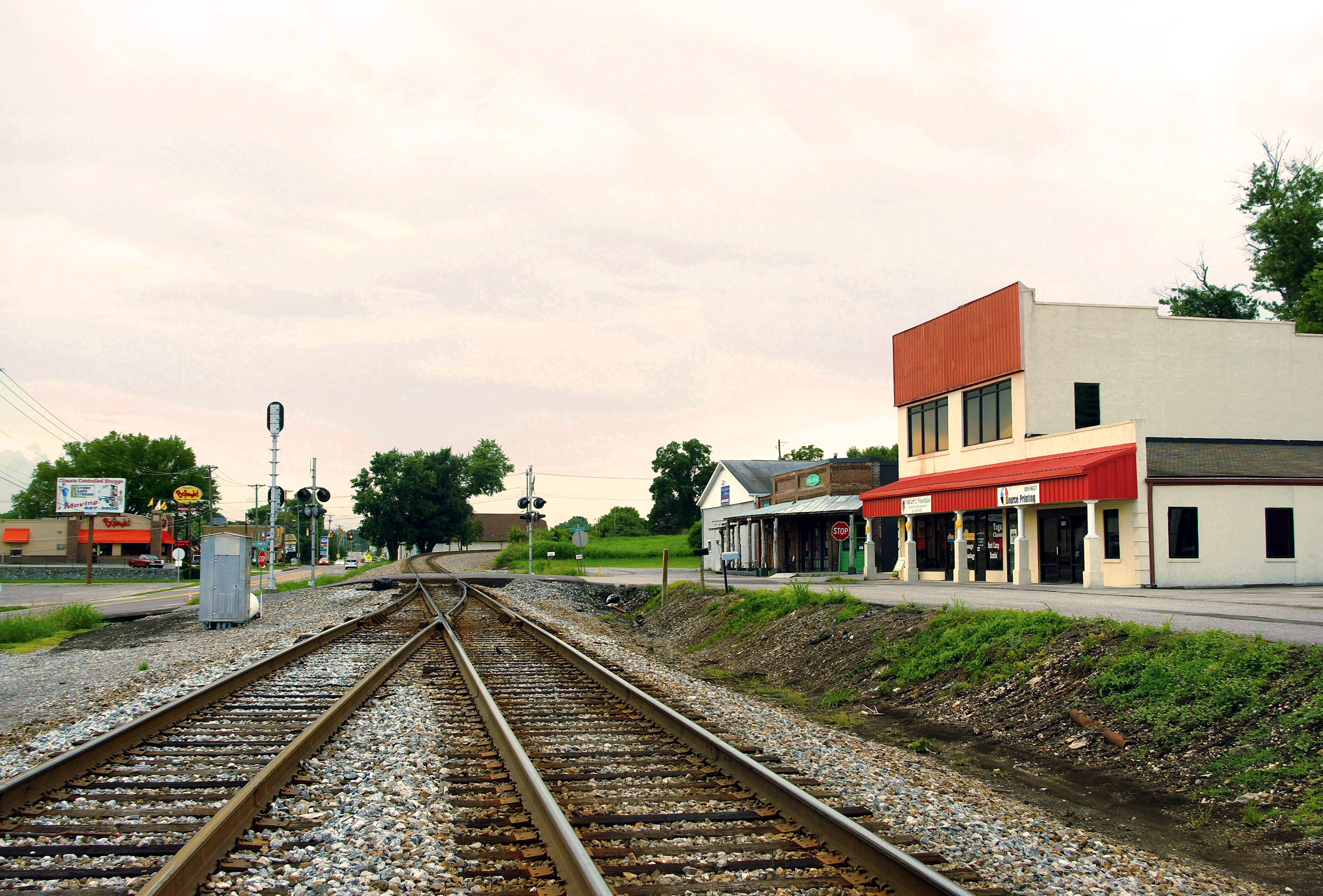
- The railroad tracks running through the heart of Downtown Powell.

- Location in Tennessee and the United States Powell (the United States)
- Coordinates: 36°01′54″N 84°01′41″W
- Country: United States
- State: Tennessee
- County: Knox
- Settled: 1792
- Named for: Columbus Powell

Area
  - Total: 8.54 sq mi (22.12 km^{2})
  - Land: 8.54 sq mi (22.12 km^{2})
  - Water: 0 sq mi (0.00 km^{2})
- Elevation: 1,060 ft (320 m)

Population (2020)
  - Total: 13,802
  - Density: 1,616.0/sq mi (623.94/km^{2})
- Time zone: UTC-5 (Eastern (EST))
  - Summer (DST): UTC-4 (EDT)
- ZIP codes: 37849
- Area code: 865
- FIPS code: 47-60480
- GNIS feature ID: 2804641

Powell, formerly known as Powell Station, is a census-designated place in Knox County, Tennessee. The area is located in the Emory Road corridor (State Route 131), just north of Knoxville, southeast of Clinton, and east of Oak Ridge. It had a population of 13,802 during the 2020 census. It is included in the Knoxville, TN Metropolitan Statistical Area.

== History ==
Despite its status as unincorporated, Powell is considered to be more of an "independent" small town than a suburb. One of the reasons behind this is that it was established in 1789 (two years before the establishment of Knoxville) by settlers passing through East Tennessee into the frontier. Among these early settlers was Stockley Donelson (1753–1804), a brother-in-law of President Andrew Jackson. Donelson's home, now known as the Alexander Bishop House, still stands on Bishop Lane. Another early settler was John Manifee, a Revolutionary War veteran who built a small fort and trading station along what is now Clinton Highway in the late 1780s.

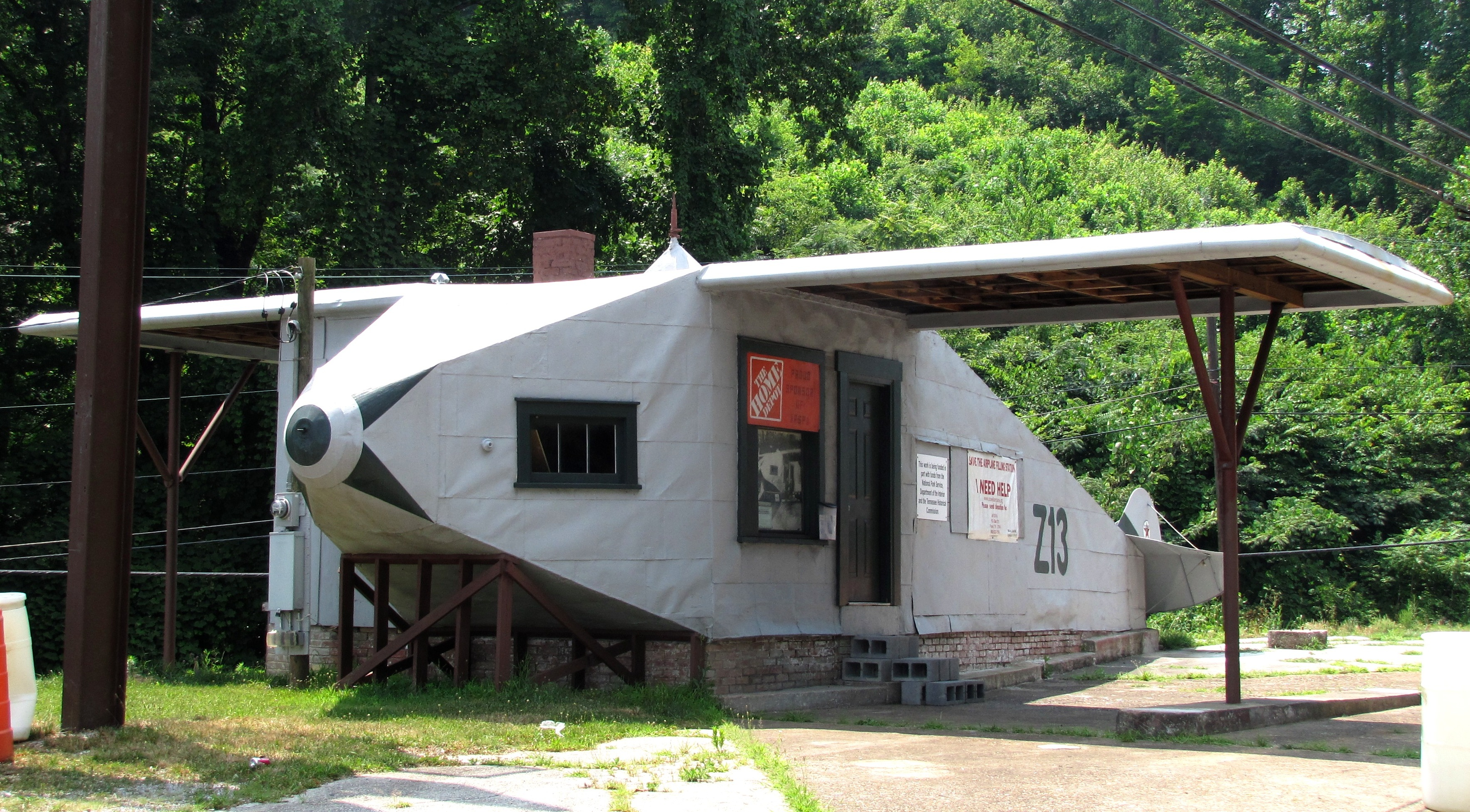
The Airplane Service Station in Powell is listed on the National Register of Historic Places

The community's name is derived from the Powell Station train stop, which was in turn named for Columbus Powell, a prominent local resident. The train station is not currently in use but remains in the town's "downtown" area. The railroad was essential to economy of early 20th century Powell as bricks were made with the mud from Beaver Creek and loaded onto the tracks and sent to various locations. The tracks were originally part of the East Tennessee, Virginia and Georgia Railway (now part of the Norfolk Southern line).

From 1951 to 2012, Powell was home to the Powell STOLport, a rural airstrip located adjacent to the I-75 and Emory Road (SR 131) interchange. In March 2013, following the Knoxville City Council's annexation of the airstrip site, the Knoxville-Knox County Metropolitan Planning Commission approved plans for a shopping complex on the site including a supermarket, theater, department store, and other retail developments.

== Geography ==
Powell lies in the Beaver Creek Valley between Copper Ridge and Beaver Ridge, two narrow ridges typical of the Ridge-and-Valley Appalachians. It is situated along Emory Road (SR 131) about halfway between Halls and Karns, and roughly spans the area between Interstate 75 to the east, and Clinton Highway (U.S. Route 25W) to the west. Knoxville lies opposite Beaver Ridge to the southeast.

== Demographics ==
Historical population
Census	Pop.	Note	%±
2020	13,802		—
U.S. Decennial Census

=== 2020 census ===
As of the 2020 census, Powell had a population of 13,802. The median age was 40.4 years. 21.8% of residents were under the age of 18 and 18.0% of residents were 65 years of age or older. For every 100 females there were 90.2 males, and for every 100 females age 18 and over there were 85.7 males age 18 and over.

99.8% of residents lived in urban areas, while 0.2% lived in rural areas.

There were 5,494 households in Powell, of which 29.0% had children under the age of 18 living in them. Of all households, 51.3% were married-couple households, 15.7% were households with a male householder and no spouse or partner present, and 27.6% were households with a female householder and no spouse or partner present. About 27.7% of all households were made up of individuals and 12.4% had someone living alone who was 65 years of age or older.

There were 5,766 housing units, of which 4.7% were vacant. The homeowner vacancy rate was 1.2% and the rental vacancy rate was 4.8%.

Racial composition as of the 2020 census
Race	Number	Percent
White	12,094	87.6%
Black or African American	318	2.3%
American Indian and Alaska Native	40	0.3%
Asian	133	1.0%
Native Hawaiian and Other Pacific Islander	0	0.0%
Some other race	427	3.1%
Two or more races	790	5.7%
Hispanic or Latino (of any race)	814	5.9%

== Economy ==
- The Weigel's chain of convenience stores started and is still headquartered in Powell.
- The largest employer in Powell is DeRoyal Industries, which manufactures and markets medical products.
- Powell was home to a Levi's jeans manufacturing plant that closed in 2002. The former Levi's property, adjacent to DeRoyal Industries, is now the site of Crown College.

== Infrastructure ==
Powell is serviced by the Hallsdale-Powell Utility District and the Knoxville Utilities Board, for wastewater, municipal water, and electricity respectively.

== Education ==
Public schools in Powell, operated by Knox County Schools, are:

- Powell High School
- Powell Middle School
- Powell Elementary School
- Brickey-McCloud Elementary School
- Copper Ridge Elementary School

Religious-based educational institutions in the community include:

- First Baptist Academy
- Crown College
- Temple Baptist Academy

Powell is well-noted throughout Knox County for its intense support of Powell High School Panther athletics. Powell High School constructed a new football stadium in 2009 and the football team is sponsored by Nike. The Panthers won the Tennessee 5A State Championship in 2021 and were Tennessee State Runners-Up in 1991 and 2011.

== Religion ==
Temple Baptist Church is a church located at 1700 Beaver Creek Drive in Powell.

First Baptist Church is located at 7706 Ewing Road in Powell.

Many other smaller churches such as One Life-North, Powell Presbyterian, and Bells Camground Baptist are also located in Powell.

== Notable people ==
- John Bruhin, Tampa Bay Buccaneers guard
- Archie Campbell, comedian, and a regular on Hee Haw is buried near Powell
- John Cooper, ESPN college football analyst, member of the College Football Hall of Fame
- Walter Nolen, football player
- Lee Smith, NFL tight end

== In literature ==
The central action of James Agee's Pulitzer Prize winning memoir, A Death in the Family, takes place in Powell.
