= Zillah, Washington =

Zillah
- City
- First Avenue in Zillah in 2015

- Location of Zillah in Washington
- Coordinates: 46°24′25″N 120°15′32″W
- Country: United States
- State: Washington
- County: Yakima
- Founded: 1892
- Incorporated: January 5, 1911

Area
  - Total: 1.82 sq mi (4.72 km^{2})
  - Land: 1.82 sq mi (4.72 km^{2})
  - Water: 0 sq mi (0.00 km^{2})
- Elevation: 820 ft (250 m)

Population (2020)
  - Total: 3,179
  - Estimate (2021): 3,157
  - Density: 1,724.7/sq mi (665.91/km^{2})
- Time zone: UTC-8 (PST)
  - Summer (DST): UTC-7 (PDT)
- ZIP code: 98953
- Area code: 509
- FIPS code: 53-80500
- GNIS feature ID: 2412331
- Website: www.cityofzillah.us

Zillah is a city in Yakima County, Washington, United States, with a population of 3,179 as of the 2020 census.

== History ==
Zillah was founded in 1891 following the completion of the Sunnyside Canal project, an irrigation scheme delivering water from the Yakima River to the arid lower Yakima Valley. Walter Granger, superintendent of the canal company, chose the town site in 1892. The town was named for Zillah Oakes, daughter of Northern Pacific Railway president Thomas Fletcher Oakes, who had financed the canal's construction. She was the youngest member of an expedition to scout possible townsites; allegedly, the town was named for Zillah after she had fallen into a stream with the party's wagon and had to be consoled by her father. Granger housed the headquarters of the Washington Irrigation Company in Zillah, giving it economical advantages for a time. He also made his residency in Zillah, becoming its mayor after retiring from the irrigation company. Zillah was officially incorporated on January 5, 1911.

== Geography ==
Zillah is located on Interstate 82 approximately 15 miles (24 km) southeast of Yakima.

According to the United States Census Bureau, the city has a total area of 1.78 square miles (4.61 km^{2}), all of it land.

== Demographics ==
Historical population
| Census | Pop. | Note | %± |
|---|---|---|---|
| 1920 | 647 | | — |
| 1930 | 728 | | 12.5% |
| 1940 | 803 | | 10.3% |
| 1950 | 911 | | 13.4% |
| 1960 | 1,059 | | 16.2% |
| 1970 | 1,138 | | 7.5% |
| 1980 | 1,599 | | 40.5% |
| 1990 | 1,911 | | 19.5% |
| 2000 | 2,198 | | 15.0% |
| 2010 | 2,964 | | 34.8% |
| 2020 | 3,179 | | 7.3% |
| 2021 (est.) | 3,157 | | −0.7% |
U.S. Decennial Census; 2020 Census

=== 2020 census ===
As of the 2020 census, Zillah had a population of 3,179. The median age was 33.9 years. 28.3% of residents were under the age of 18 and 13.4% of residents were 65 years of age or older. For every 100 females there were 95.2 males, and for every 100 females age 18 and over there were 91.4 males age 18 and over.

0.0% of residents lived in urban areas, while 100.0% lived in rural areas.

There were 1,098 households in Zillah, of which 41.1% had children under the age of 18 living in them. Of all households, 52.9% were married-couple households, 14.7% were households with a male householder and no spouse or partner present, and 24.0% were households with a female householder and no spouse or partner present. About 20.9% of all households were made up of individuals and 9.4% had someone living alone who was 65 years of age or older.

There were 1,147 housing units, of which 4.3% were vacant. The homeowner vacancy rate was 0.5% and the rental vacancy rate was 3.9%.

Racial composition as of the 2020 census
| Race | Number | Percent |
|---|---|---|
| White | 1,769 | 55.6% |
| Black or African American | 11 | 0.3% |
| American Indian and Alaska Native | 169 | 5.3% |
| Asian | 19 | 0.6% |
| Native Hawaiian and Other Pacific Islander | 2 | 0.1% |
| Some other race | 707 | 22.2% |
| Two or more races | 502 | 15.8% |
| Hispanic or Latino (of any race) | 1,482 | 46.6% |

=== 2010 census ===
As of the 2010 census, there were 2,964 people, 1,033 households, and 741 families living in the city. The population density was 1,665.2 inhabitants per square mile (642.9/km^{2}). There were 1,105 housing units at an average density of 620.8 per square mile (239.7/km^{2}). The racial makeup of the city was 63.8% White, 0.3% African American, 3.8% Native American, 0.9% Asian, 0.2% Pacific Islander, 27.1% from other races, and 3.9% from two or more races. Hispanic or Latino of any race were 42.5% of the population.

There were 1,033 households, of which 43.4% had children under the age of 18 living with them, 53.0% were married couples living together, 13.1% had a female householder with no husband present, 5.6% had a male householder with no wife present, and 28.3% were non-families. 23.9% of all households were made up of individuals, and 8.9% had someone living alone who was 65 years of age or older. The average household size was 2.87 and the average family size was 3.40.

The median age in the city was 31.9 years. 31.4% of residents were under the age of 18; 8.9% were between the ages of 18 and 24; 27.3% were from 25 to 44; 22.9% were from 45 to 64; and 9.3% were 65 years of age or older. The gender makeup of the city was 49.8% male and 50.2% female.

=== 2000 census ===
As of the 2000 census, there were 2,198 people, 792 households, and 591 families living in the city. The population density was 1,807.9 inhabitants per square mile (695.6/km^{2}). There were 837 housing units at an average density of 688.4 per square mile (264.9/km^{2}). The racial makeup of the city was 73.25% White, 0.82% African American, 2.14% Native American, 0.77% Asian, 0.36% Pacific Islander, 18.29% from other races, and 4.37% from two or more races. Hispanic or Latino of any race were 26.07% of the population.

There were 792 households, out of which 40.2% had children under the age of 18 living with them, 56.9% were married couples living together, 13.8% had a female householder with no husband present, and 25.3% were non-families. 21.7% of all households were made up of individuals, and 10.0% had someone living alone who was 65 years of age or older. The average household size was 2.78 and the average family size was 3.22.

In the city, the population was spread out, with 31.2% under the age of 18, 8.2% from 18 to 24, 27.6% from 25 to 44, 19.3% from 45 to 64, and 13.7% who were 65 and up. The median age was 33 years. For every 100 females, there were 92.0 males. For every 100 females age 18 and over, there were 89.0 males.

The median income for a household in the city was $38,214, and the median income for a family was $44,688. Males had a median income of $33,819 versus $23,603 for females. The per capita income for the city was $16,415. 13.8% of the population and 9.0% of families were below the poverty line. Out of the total population, 16.4% of those under the age of 18 and 16.6% of those 65 and older were living below the poverty line.

== Schools ==
The Zillah School District is a small rural district of approximately 1,250 students. Its four schools are:

- Hilton Elementary School (grades K-3)
- Zillah Intermediate School (grades 4–6)
- Zillah Middle School (grades 7–8)
- Zillah High School

Zillah is one of Yakima County's smallest districts by area, at an estimated 44 square miles. It also offers an alternative school program.

== Tourist attractions ==
- Church of God Zillah – The church was named long before the Godzilla movies began; later renamed to the "Christian Worship Center" in the 1980s.
- Teapot Dome Service Station – listed on the National Register of Historic Places
- Yakima Valley AVA
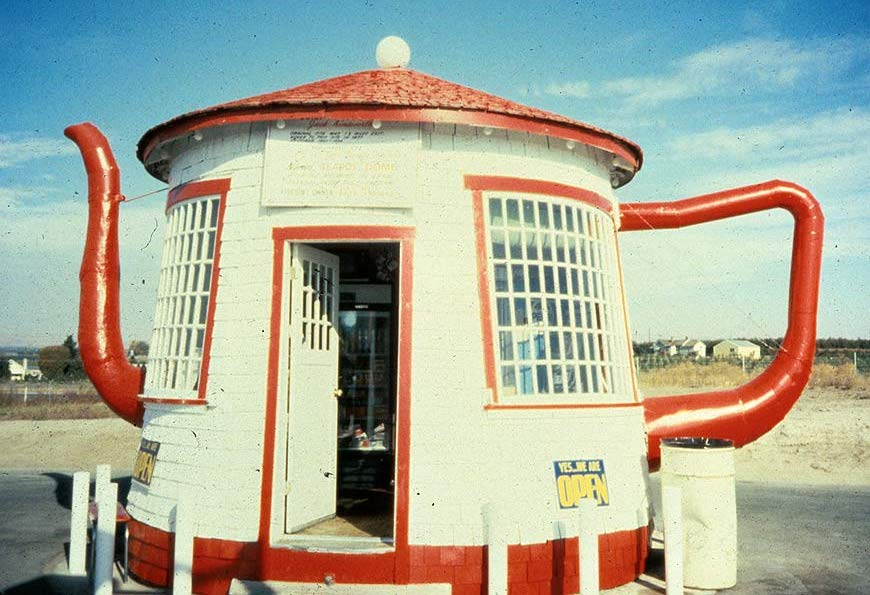
Teapot Dome Service Station in Zillah, Washington

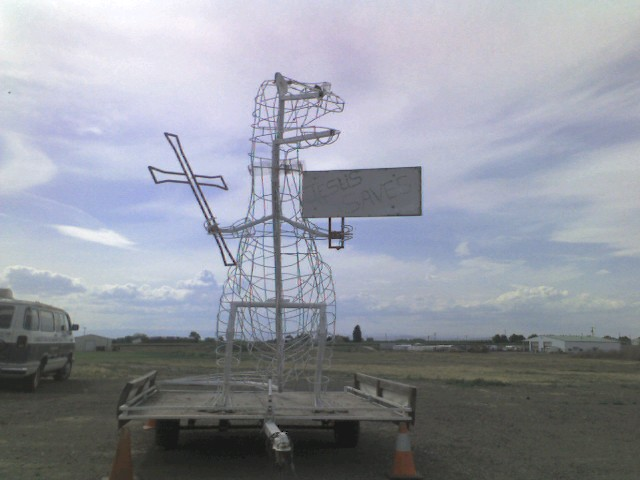
Godzilla model found outside the Church of God Zillah

== Notable people ==
- R. Lee Ermey, American film, television and voice actor, and Marine drill instructor
- Sid Morrison, former member of the United States House of Representatives who resided in Zillah.
