= Teapot Dome Service Station =

Former gas station in Zillah, Washington, US

- U.S. National Register of Historic Places
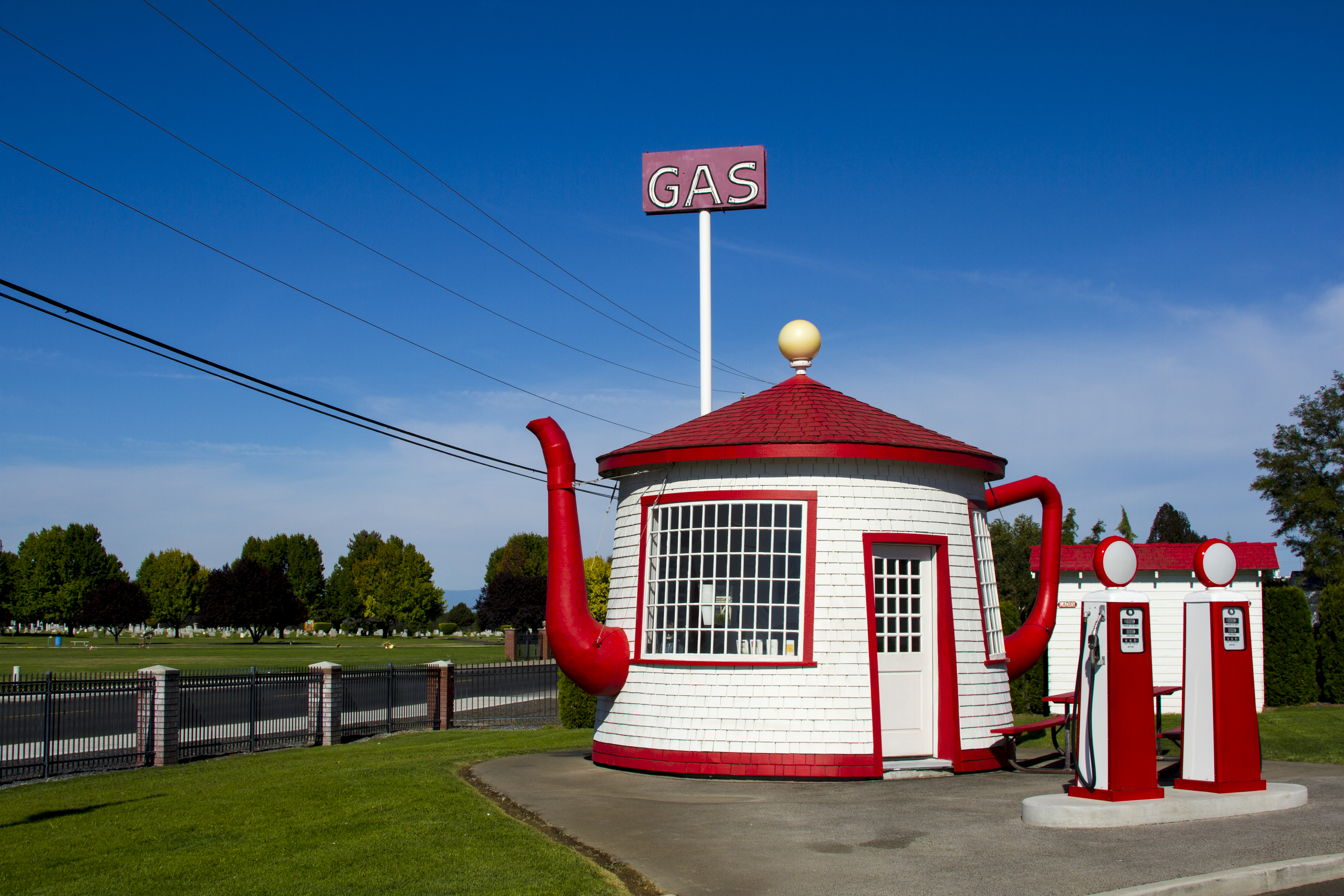
- The Teapot Dome Service Station is an example of novelty architecture and of a roadside attraction, August 2017.

- Location within Washington (state) Location within the United States
- Interactive map showing the location of Teapot Dome Service Station
- Location: Old State HW 12; Zillah, Washington; United States
- Coordinates: 46°24′16.8″N 120°16′10.35″W
- Area: 2 acres (0.81 ha)
- Built: 1922
- Architect: Ainsworth, Jack
- Architectural style: Follies
- NRHP reference No.: 85001943
- Added to NRHP: August 29, 1985

The Teapot Dome Service Station is a former gas station built in the shape of a teapot located in Zillah, Washington, United States, that is listed on the National Register of Historic Places.

== Description ==
Located at 117 First Avenue, the station is an example of novelty architecture. It was intended as a reminder of the Teapot Dome Scandal that rocked the presidency of Warren G. Harding and sent Interior Secretary Albert Fall to prison for his role in leasing government oil reserves in, among other places, Teapot Dome, Wyoming.

== History ==
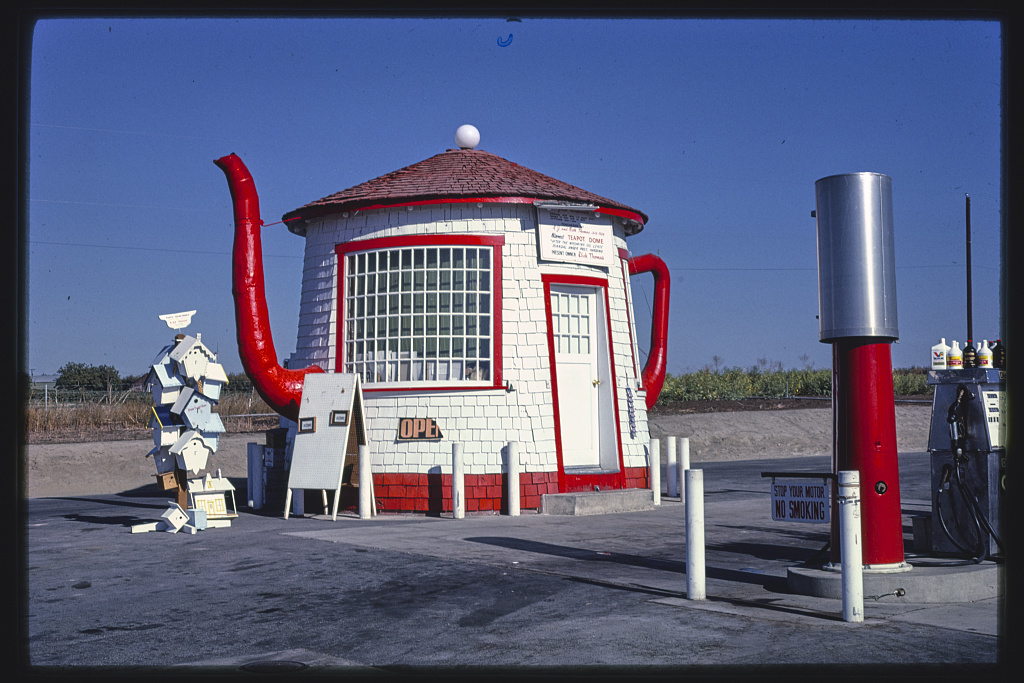
The Teapot Dome Station, 1987

The station was built in 1922 on what later became U.S. Route 12. The building has a circular frame with a conical roof, sheet metal "handle", and a concrete "spout". Many such novelties were constructed as roadside attractions as the national highway system in the United States expanded during the 1920s and 1930s. The unique service station continued operation as a full-service gas station for some years. When Interstate 82 was constructed near Zillah in 1978 the station was relocated less than a mile down the Yakima Valley Highway. After the gas station was closed in 2006, it was purchased by the city the following year, rehabilitated, and relocated in 2012 to 117 First Avenue. It now serves as Zillah's visitors center.

== See also ==
- National Register of Historic Places listings in Yakima County, Washington
- Airplane Service Station, 1930 station built in the shape of an airplane, Tennessee
- Chester teapot
- Shell Service Station, 1930 station built in the shape of a scallop shell, North Carolina
