= Little Rock campaign =

1863 military campaign of the American Civil War

- Part of the American Civil War
- Operational scope: Strategic offensive
- Location: Central Arkansas; 34°43′19″N 92°12′05″W
- Commanded by: (United States) Maj. Gen. Frederick Steele
- Objective: Capture of Little Rock
- Date: August 1 – September 14, 1863 (1 month, 1 week and 6 days)
- Executed by: "Arkansas Expedition"
- Outcome: Union victory
- Location of Little Rock in Arkansas

The Little Rock campaign (August 1 – September 14, 1863), officially known as the Advance of the Union forces upon Little Rock, Arkansas, was a campaign conducted by the Union Army in Arkansas during the Civil War. The strategic offensive was designed to capture Little Rock.

Union forces led by Major General Frederick Steele advanced from Helena, Arkansas, beginning on August 1, before joining cavalry commanded by Brigadier General John W. Davidson at Clarendon on August 15. Steele sent Davidson to move against the Confederates, while he pulled his infantry to establish a base at DeValls Bluff. Davidson's men fought with Confederate cavalry commanded by brigadier generals Lucius M. Walker and John S. Marmaduke at Brownsville on August 25 and Bayou Meto on August 27 before the Confederates withdrew closer to Little Rock.

The overall Confederate commander, Major General Sterling Price, aligned most of his 8,000-man army in fortifications north of the Arkansas River, while some cavalry defended river crossings south of Little Rock. Meanwhile, Steele, who had received reinforcements that brought the total Union strength to about 15,000, arrived at Brownsville with his infantry on September 2. Marmaduke killed Walker in a duel on September 6, and Davidson's men drove Confederate cavalry commanded by Robert C. Newton across the Arkansas River in a skirmish at Ashley's Mills. On September 10, Davidson's men crossed the Arkansas River while the Union infantry moved along the north bank of the river. While Marmaduke and Davidson fought the Battle of Bayou Fourche later that day, Price had Little Rock abandoned; the Confederates were out of the city by 5:00 pm. With the fall of Little Rock, the Union controlled most of Arkansas. The failed Camden Expedition in March 1864 was the last major Union offensive in Arkansas, and Price's Missouri Expedition in late 1864 was the last major campaign in the region. Confederate troops in the Trans-Mississippi Department surrendered on June 2, 1865.

== Overview ==
Locations of Little Rock, Helena, and Brownsville within Arkansas

After the American Civil War opened with Confederate forces bombarding Ft. Sumter on April 12, 1861, the southern state of Arkansas seceded from the Union on May 6. Union forces pushed into northern Arkansas in early 1862, and defeated the Confederates in the Battle of Pea Ridge in March. Afterwards, Union Major General Samuel R. Curtis moved across Arkansas with his troops, and for a time threatened the state capitol of Little Rock. Running out of supplies, the Union troops abandoned efforts against Little Rock and pushed east, for a while without a direct supply line, to Helena, Arkansas, which they captured on July 12.

Confederate troops commanded by Lieutenant General Theophilus Holmes attacked Helena on July 4, 1863, but were repulsed. The end of the Vicksburg campaign in Mississippi freed up additional Union troops for operations in Arkansas, and Major-General Frederick Steele was sent to Helena to take command of the Union troops there. Major General Benjamin Prentiss, the previous Union commander in the area and the victor at Helena, felt slighted at Steele's appointment, which had originated from Major General Ulysses S. Grant. Additional Union troops commanded by Brigadier General John W. Davidson moved south from Pilot Knob, Missouri, and reached Wittsburg, Arkansas on July 28, where they were able to make contact with the troops in Helena. Steele had 7,000 total infantry and cavalry, along with five artillery batteries, in Helena, while Davidson commanded 6,000 cavalry. On July 23, with Holmes ill and bedridden, Confederate command fell to Major General Sterling Price. Price theoretically had about 32,000 men in the military district, but only about 14,500 had been present for duty before Helena, and Price later noted that only about 8,000 men were actually available to him during the campaign.

Expecting a Union offensive, Price ordered fortifications built across the Arkansas River and 2.5 miles (4.0 km) downstream from Little Rock, in a position between a river and a swamp. Price believed that his only real chance of success would be if a Union force attacked his fortifications head-on, but the existence of several crossing points further down the Arkansas River rendered this possibility unlikely. He also ordered Brigadier General James F. Fagan's infantry division to the Bayou Meto area, ordered Brigadier General Lucius M. Walker's cavalry to fall back from near Helena to Clarendon on August 2, and gave Brigadier General John S. Marmaduke's cavalry orders to monitor Union movements from the Jacksonport area but to avoid a major battle east of the White River, which could prevent his retreat. After Walker abandoned Clarendon, Davidson's men occupied the city.

== The campaign ==
=== Early maneuvers ===
Steele's men left Helena on August 10 and 11. Historian Albert Castel suggests that the primary purpose of the expedition was political, with the goal of installing a competing pro-Union government at Little Rock. On August 12, Davidson sent out a joint army-Union Navy expedition to gather information about Price's army, destroy a Confederate telegraph station, and capture two Confederate ships. This affair saw the first fighting of the campaign the next day: the gunboat USS Cricket was able to capture the two Confederate steamers. Although Confederate cavalry attacked the expedition, it was able to return safely with casualties of two men killed and six wounded. The Confederates reported having seven or eight men wounded. As Davidson's men advanced, they fought a minor skirmish with Confederate cavalry on August 16. Davidson sent out the 13th Illinois Cavalry Regiment that same day, which routed Confederate cavalry commanded by Robert C. Newton 8 miles (13 km) from Clarendon on August 17.

Steele's men suffered during their march to Clarendon from heat, heavy dust, and contaminated water. They began to reach Clarendon on August 15, but conditions there were not much better. Within two days, over a thousand of Steele's men were sick. On August 22, Steele sent Davidson towards Little Rock with his cavalry, while Steele and the infantry moved beginning on the next day to set up an operations hub at DeValls Bluff, which was hoped to be a healthier area. Meanwhile, Price removed Fagan from command and replaced him with Brigadier-General Daniel M. Frost. He also grouped Walker's and Marmaduke's cavalry together, under the command of the former. This exacerbated tensions between Walker and Marmaduke, which had formed during the fighting at Helena.

=== Brownsville and Bayou Meto ===
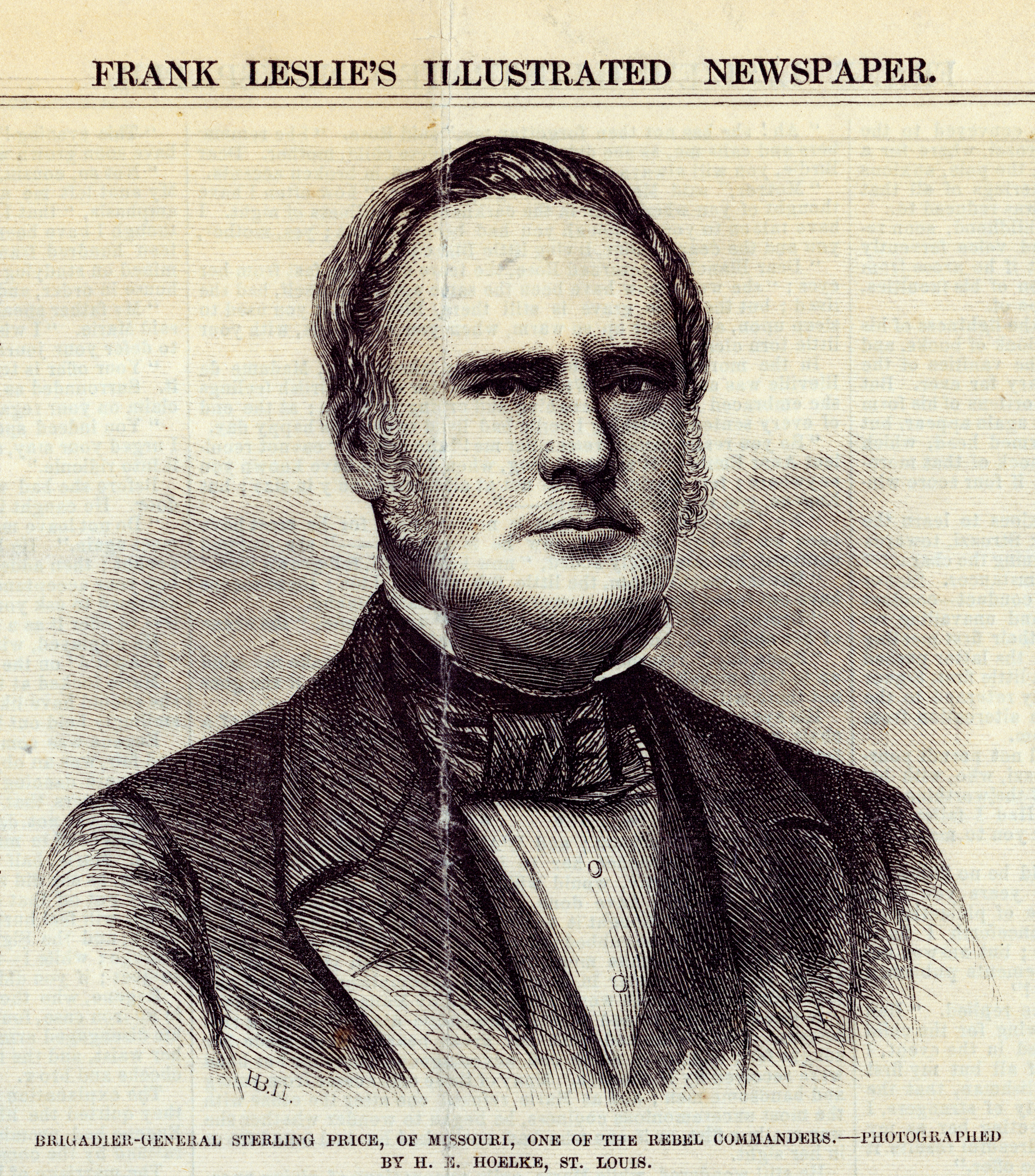
Wartime image of Price

Walker and Marmaduke formed a plan where Walker and some of his men would hold back in a woodline west of Brownsville, while Marmaduke would try to use a rear guard to draw the Union troops into an ambush. On August 25, the plan culminated in the Battle of Brownsville, the first significant fighting during the campaign. During the battle, Marmaduke fought against Davidson with about 1,300 badly outnumbered men. After being driven back, Marmaduke's men attempted to form a new line, but were forced to retreat again. Walker's men never entered the fighting, which further strained his relationship with Marmaduke. The Confederates then withdrew to Bayou Meto, while Davidson's men stopped at Brownsville to wait for the infantry to arrive. The Confederates defended Reed's Bridge over Bayou Meto, which was about 12 miles (19 km) from Little Rock.

Price began to doubt that Little Rock could be defended, so he had supplies transferred to Arkadelphia and started preparations for the evacuation of the city. Union captures of Fort Smith, Arkansas and Monroe, Louisiana had already disrupted Confederate communications to the south and west. Minor skirmishing occurred on August 26 as Davidson sent patrols to scout the Confederate position at Bayou Meto and Shallow Ford further to the south. Davidson's cavalry attacked Confederate position the next day, bringing on the Battle of Bayou Meto. Union troops drove Confederate skirmishers back across the bayou, and the Confederates burned Reed's Bridge, the only nearby crossing. Union cavalry made more advances, likely to rescue the wounded, but most of the rest of the fighting was an artillery duel. A Confederate unit, Bell's Missouri Battery, was wrecked during the action, leading Marmaduke to group all his artillery together with the aim of retaliating against the Union guns with concentrated fire. The Confederate right was weak, but was not strongly attacked. That night, the Union troops withdrew to Brownsville, and the Confederates to within 5 miles (8.0 km) of Little Rock. The fighting on August 27 cost the Union seven men killed and 38 wounded, while Confederate losses were not reported. Castel believes that by not making a stronger stand at Bayou Meto, Price lost his best chance to defeat Steele.

=== Crossing the Arkansas ===
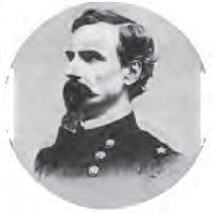
Davidson in uniform

The next several days saw little fighting. Davidson had a detachment scout down the road to Shallow Ford on August 29, and the next day, Davidson's advance guard skirmished with some of Newton's Confederate cavalry. More skirmishing between Davidson's men and Newton's command occurred on August 31, but Newton withdrew most of his men to Ashley's Mills on September 1. The brigade of Colonel James M. True had joined Steele on August 30, bringing the total Union strength to about 15,000 men. Steele arrived at Brownsville with the infantry on the next day; the Union forces spent the next three days scouting. Price had fewer than 8,000 men with which to defend Little Rock; about 6,500 were in the fortifications across the river and the rest were mainly cavalry with Walker guarding river crossings south of the city.

On September 6, the Union troops crossed Bayou Meto at Shallow Ford and began moving towards Ashley's Mills to cross the Arkansas River there, a route that would bypass Price's fortifications. That same day, the tensions between Marmaduke and Walker culminated in a duel in which the latter was killed. Command of Walker's division fell to Archibald Dobbins. The next day, Steele's men drove Newton's command across the river in a skirmish at Ashley's Mills. The Union troops spent the next two days scouting. Steele formed a battle plan on September 9. Davidson would force a crossing of the river and outflank the Confederate fortifications, while the infantry would move along the north bank of the Arkansas River. Two brigades, including True's, would remain at Brownsville to guard supplies. On the morning of September 10, Etter's Arkansas Battery attempted to contest Davidson's crossing at Terry's Ferry, but Davidson's artillery silenced the guns, and the crossing was completed without major difficulties. Davidson also made a feint at a ford further downstream.

=== Evacuation of Little Rock ===
With Union forces across the Arkansas River, Price withdrew his men from their entrenchments on the northern side, and began to evacuate the city, intending to avoid being trapped within the city like the Confederate defenders of Vicksburg, Mississippi had been earlier in the year. He also sent Marmaduke's cavalry and an infantry brigade commanded by James Tappan to Dobbins's support. Dobbins's men made a fighting retreat 5 miles (8 km) back to Bayou Fourche, where they prepared to make a stand. Marmaduke took command of the Confederate forces at Bayou Meto, but Dobbins refused to take orders from him because of the death of Walker. Marmaduke had Dobbins arrested, but Price quickly released him. Union troops advanced against Marmaduke's line, and the ensuing Battle of Bayou Fourche was the heaviest fighting of the campaign.

As Davidson's men approached, they were separated into two wings by the bayou, with the right commanded by Colonel John Montgomery Glover and the left by Colonel Lewis Merrill. On the Union right, the 10th Illinois Cavalry Regiment was driven back, and a Union artillery battery was overrun by a Confederate attack. Glover redeployed the 10th Illinois and the 3rd Missouri Cavalry Regiment, and had the 1st Iowa Cavalry Regiment pulled from Merrill's wing. Merrill came under fire from Pratt's Texas Battery; Union artillery was brought up to fire on Pratt's battery, but was ineffective. The two Union brigades were disjointed, and Merrill found his right flank exposed to Confederate fire. Glover and Merrill made advances, but did not cooperate with each other. Later in the fighting, the Union artillery with the infantry on the far side of the river was able to fire into the Confederate position.

The action at Bayou Fourche cost the Union seven men killed and sixty-four wounded. No fighting occurred north of the Arkansas River, although two Union artillerymen serving a battery accompanying the infantry were wounded by an accidental explosion. Price's men burned bridges, railroad equipment, and the gunboat CSS Pontchartrain. The last of the Confederates were out of the city by 5:00 pm, and Little Rock's civilian government surrendered the city to the Union two hours later. The Confederates fell back to Arkadelphia; Merrill led two brigades on a halfhearted pursuit on September 11. An attempt to resume the pursuit the next day found that the Confederate rear guard had gotten away. Steele criticized Merrill's handling of the retreat. Union troops captured five cannons, 3,000 pounds (1,400 kg) of gunpowder, and many cartridges in the city. Steele's losses were 18 men killed, 118 wounded, and one man missing; the Confederates reported 12 men killed, 34 wounded, and 18 captured or missing although this figure is based on incomplete reporting and the true number is higher. Both sides's figures exclude deaths due to disease, and the Confederates abandoned 650 sick and wounded in Little Rock. Many Confederate troops deserted during the retreat; historian Carl Moneyhon estimates the number of desertions as 1,900.

== Aftermath ==
Historian Mark Christ states that Steele "achieved a remarkable victory" and states that the only criticism of Steele's campaign was his failure to strongly pursue. Christ also quotes historian Shelby Foote as estimating that the campaign gave the Union control of three-quarters of Arkansas. Castel states that a better performance by Price would have made the capture more difficult, but doubts that the fall of the city was preventable with what Price had on hand. Historian Robert L. Kerby speaks of Price's "tactical ineptitude" and Steele's "brilliant execution of the campaign". The fall of Little Rock also further isolated the Trans-Mississippi Department from the rest of the Confederacy, cut off Confederate recruiting in Missouri and the Indian Territory, and prevented the Confederates from using the Arkansas River Valley as a base for offensive operations. For the Union, the capture of a Confederate state capital was a morale boost, especially as the campaign had cost few casualties. There was some Confederate dissatisfaction at abandoning Little Rock without a fight, although E. Kirby Smith, the Confederate commander of the Trans-Mississippi Department supported Price's decision to withdraw, as he considered keeping the army intact more important than holding Little Rock.

Steele placed Davidson in command of the defense of the city, ordered the construction of defensive positions south of the city, had Isaac Murphy appointed as a provisional governor, and sent Powell Clayton to occupy Pine Bluff. Arkansas's Confederate government relocated to Washington. Steele did not drive further into Arkansas due to diversion of reinforcement to other areas, the upcoming wet season which would make travel difficult, distracting Confederate raids, and orders from General Henry Halleck to secure his position. Later in September, Confederate cavalry launched a limited raid into Missouri that Kerby describes as "thrilling but pointless". After capturing Little Rock, Union forces garrisoned several other towns along the Arkansas River. Marmaduke attempted to retake Pine Bluff in late October, but was repulsed in the Battle of Pine Bluff. In late 1863, Confederate troops began to fortify Camden in southern Arkansas. In March 1864, Steele began the Camden Expedition. Initially aiming for Arkadelphia to avoid the Camden fortifications, Steele was forced to re-route to Camden due to supply issues. After occupying Camden on April 15, his men began withdrawing on April 26, and returned to Little Rock on May 2. The Camden Expedition was the final Union offensive in Arkansas. In September 1864, Price led an expedition into Missouri, but the campaign was a disaster and ended with a Confederate defeat. Price's expedition was the last major operation in the Trans-Mississippi Theater. Confederate forces in the region surrendered on June 2, 1865. A series of eight sites from the campaign were later preserved and grouped together as the Little Rock Campaign Tour.

== See also ==
- Lists of American Civil War Regiments by State
- Arkansas in the American Civil War
- Arkansas Militia in the Civil War
