= Bayou Meto (disambiguation) =

Bayou Meto is a river in Arkansas, U.S.

Bayou Meto may also refer to the following places in the U.S.:

- Bayou Meto, Arkansas County, Arkansas
- Bayou Meto, Lonoke County, Arkansas
- Bayou Meto Elementary School, Jacksonville North Pulaski School District, Arkansas

== See also ==
- Bayou (disambiguation)
- Battle of Bayou Meto, during the American Civil War
  - Bayou Meto Battlefield
