= Battle of Brownsville, Arkansas =

1863 battle of the American Civil War

Battle of Brownsville
- Part of the American Civil War
Date	August 25, 1863
Location	Lonoke County, Arkansas 34°48′55″N 91°52′46″W
Result	Union victory

Belligerents
United States (Union)	Confederate States

Commanders and leaders
(United States) Washington Geiger	(Confederate States of America) John Marmaduke

Strength
c. 5,200	c. 1,300
- Location in Arkansas

The Battle of Brownsville was fought on August 25, 1863, near what is now Lonoke, Arkansas, between Union forces led by Colonel Washington Geiger and Confederate troops under Brigadier General John S. Marmaduke. Union forces commanded by Major General Frederick Steele were advancing from Helena, Arkansas, towards Little Rock, the state capital of Arkansas. Confederate Major General Sterling Price ordered cavalry led by Marmaduke and Brigadier General Lucius M. Walker to Brownsville in response to the Union advance.

Marmaduke's men defended a forward position, while Walker's remained to the rear in some woods; the plan was for Marmaduke to draw Union troops into an ambush. However, Walker did not come to Marmaduke's aid when a Union brigade commanded by Geiger advanced. Geiger's men drove the outnumbered Confederates from their first position. Reforming, Marmaduke attempted to form another line further to the west, but retreated again after delaying the Union advance. Union troops pursued until nightfall. The campaign against Little Rock continued, and the city was taken on September 10.

== Background ==
In mid-1862, Union troops occupied the Confederate town of Helena, Arkansas. On July 4, 1863, Confederate troops attacked the Union defenders in the Battle of Helena but were repulsed. That same month, Union troops were freed for further action in the state of Arkansas after a victory at the Siege of Vicksburg. August 10 and 11 saw 6,000 men and 16 cannons led by Union Major General Frederick Steele leave Helena to begin moving against Little Rock, the capital of Arkansas. Commanding the Confederate troops in the region was Major General Sterling Price, who had replaced the ill Theophilus Holmes.

Steele reached Clarendon, Arkansas, on August 17, where he joined forces with cavalry commanded by Brigadier General John W. Davidson. Illness had hampered the Union movements, and over 1,000 of Steele's men were sick. Steele began moving his base of operations to DeValls Bluff while sending Davidson's men across the White River to locate the Confederates. Meanwhile, Price sent cavalry commanded by Brigadier General John S. Marmaduke to the hamlet of Brownsville (near what is now Lonoke, Arkansas), to join forces with Brigadier General Lucius M. Walker. Walker was in overall command of the two forces, although the two officers did not get along well after a dispute during the fighting at Helena. Brownsville is about 30 miles (48 km) east of Little Rock and was along one of the major travel routes to the city.

== Battle ==
The initial Confederate battle plan was for Walker to remain with some of the men in a woodline, while Marmaduke formed a line towards the front and tried to draw the leading Union units into an ambush. Marmaduke's forward line was about 1,300 men strong, and was composed of Shelby's Iron Brigade and another cavalry force led by William L. Jeffers, and was supported by one cannon from Bell's Missouri Battery and a portion of Joseph Bledsoe's Missouri Battery. On the morning of August 25, a Union cavalry brigade led by Colonel Washington Geiger advanced and made contact with the Confederate along the edge of a prairie. The Union troops outnumbered the Confederates by about four-to-one in manpower and eight-to-one in artillery.

Geiger brought two regiments into line of battle, and began to advance. Bledsoe's battery opened fire on the Union troopers, and the Union brought up artillery as well. A sabre charge by a small force of Union cavalry routed the Confederates before a flanking attack could hit the Confederate line. Confederate colonel John Quincy Burbridge was captured during the fighting. Marmaduke fell back 6 miles (9.7 km) west, and formed a new position. A Union cavalry unit from Missouri known as Merrill's Horse attempted to cross the prairie in front of the new Confederate position, but was thrown into confusion by fire from Bell's battery. Davidson brought up two batteries to fire on the Confederate position, although Confederate officer B. Frank Gordon claimed that the fire had little effect.

The Confederates were unable to organize their line, and fell back from the second position. Geiger's men pursued over a distance of above 7 miles (11 km) until night fell, and then withdrew back to Brownsville. Walker's men never came to the aid of Marmaduke's, making the strained relationship between the two men worse. The action slowed the Union advance while Davidson waited for the infantry to catch up.

== Aftermath ==
The day after the action at Brownsville, Price ordered Marmaduke and Walker to Bayou Meto. On August 27, Davidson's men attacked the Confederates in the Battle of Bayou Meto. While the Confederate again delayed the Union advance, they retreated closer to Little Rock after that action. Steele and the infantry reached Brownsville on September 2. The tensions between Marmaduke and Walker boiled over on September 6, with Marmaduke fatally shooting Walker in a duel that day. Davidson fought the Skirmish at Ashley's Mills on September 7. Union troops crossed the Arkansas River on September 10, and Davidson's men fought the Confederates in the Battle of Bayou Fourche while Price abandoned Little Rock. The Confederates withdrew to Camden and Arkadelphia. Little Rock was the fourth Confederate state capital to fall to Union forces, and the capture of the city resulted in the Trans-Mississippi Department being even more isolated from the rest of the Confederacy.

== See also ==
- List of American Civil War battles
- Troop engagements of the American Civil War, 1863
