= Battle of Bayou Meto =

1863 battle of the American Civil War

- Part of the American Civil War
Date	August 27, 1863
Location	Pulaski County (present-day Jacksonville), Arkansas 34°50′33.0″N 92°07′12.0″W
Result	Confederate victory

Belligerents
Confederate States	United States (Union)

Commanders and leaders
(Confederate States of America) John S. Marmaduke	(United States) John W. Davidson

Casualties and losses
Unknown	45 or 46
- Location in Arkansas

The Battle of Bayou Meto, also known as the Battle of Reed's Bridge, was fought near present-day Jacksonville, Arkansas, along the Bayou Meto River, on August 27, 1863. During the American Civil War, Union forces left Helena, Arkansas, to move against the Confederate-held state capital of Little Rock. Part of the Union command, under Brigadier General John W. Davidson, defeated Confederate cavalry commanded by Brigadier General John S. Marmaduke on August 25, in the Battle of Brownsville. After the action at Brownsville, the Confederates fell back to the Bayou Meto. Union attacks on August 27 succeeded in pushing Marmaduke's men back across the bayou, but were unable to break the Confederate line. Davidson withdrew back to Brownsville after the fighting. The Union advance resumed on September 6, and Little Rock surrendered on September 10, after the Battle of Bayou Fourche. Tensions exacerbated during the action at Bayou Meto contributed to the Marmaduke-Walker duel, during which a Confederate general was killed. In 2002, part of the battlefield was listed on the National Register of Historic Places as the Bayou Meto Battlefield.

== Background ==

In early 1863, during the American Civil War, the Confederate situation in the state of Arkansas looked bleak. Union forces had won two significant victories in northwestern Arkansas in 1862, and had occupied the Mississippi River town of Helena. January 1863 saw the loss of Arkansas Post, and an attempt to retake Helena on July 4 was bloodily repulsed. Union forces wished to control the Arkansas River, and the Union victory in the Siege of Vicksburg had freed up previously-occupied troops for service in Arkansas. Major General Frederick Steele was placed in command of Union forces at Helena. Steele began an offensive movement against the state capital and Arkansas River stronghold of Little Rock on August 10 and 11.

His men reached Clarendon on August 17, where they were joined by a cavalry force commanded by Brigadier General John W. Davidson. However, Steele's force was wracked with disease and the Union commander sent Davidson and his cavalry across the river, while moving the rest of his force upriver to DeValls Bluff, which was believed to be a healthier location. On the Confederate side, Lieutenant General Theophilus Holmes had fallen ill and was replaced by Major General Sterling Price. Price responded to the Union movements by ordering cavalry commanded by Brigadier Generals Lucius M. Walker and John S. Marmaduke to gather at Brownsville, which was on the road to Little Rock. Walker and Marmaduke had both fought at Helena, where an intense feud between the two generals had formed. Price also ordered the construction of defensive positions across the river from Little Rock. He was aware, though, that his position was only really tenable if the Union attacked head-on, which was unlikely, as the Arkansas River could easily be crossed at many places downriver from the city. The Confederate position at Fort Smith on the Arkansas on the western side of the state was also threatened, and Price began removing stored materials from Little Rock and preparing to evacuate. On August 26, part of Davidson's command encountered Marmaduke near Brownsville, and drove the outnumbered Confederates back in the Battle of Brownsville. The next day, Marmaduke and Walker fell back to the far side of the Bayou Meto River, which was 12 miles (19 km) northeast of Little Rock.

== Battle ==
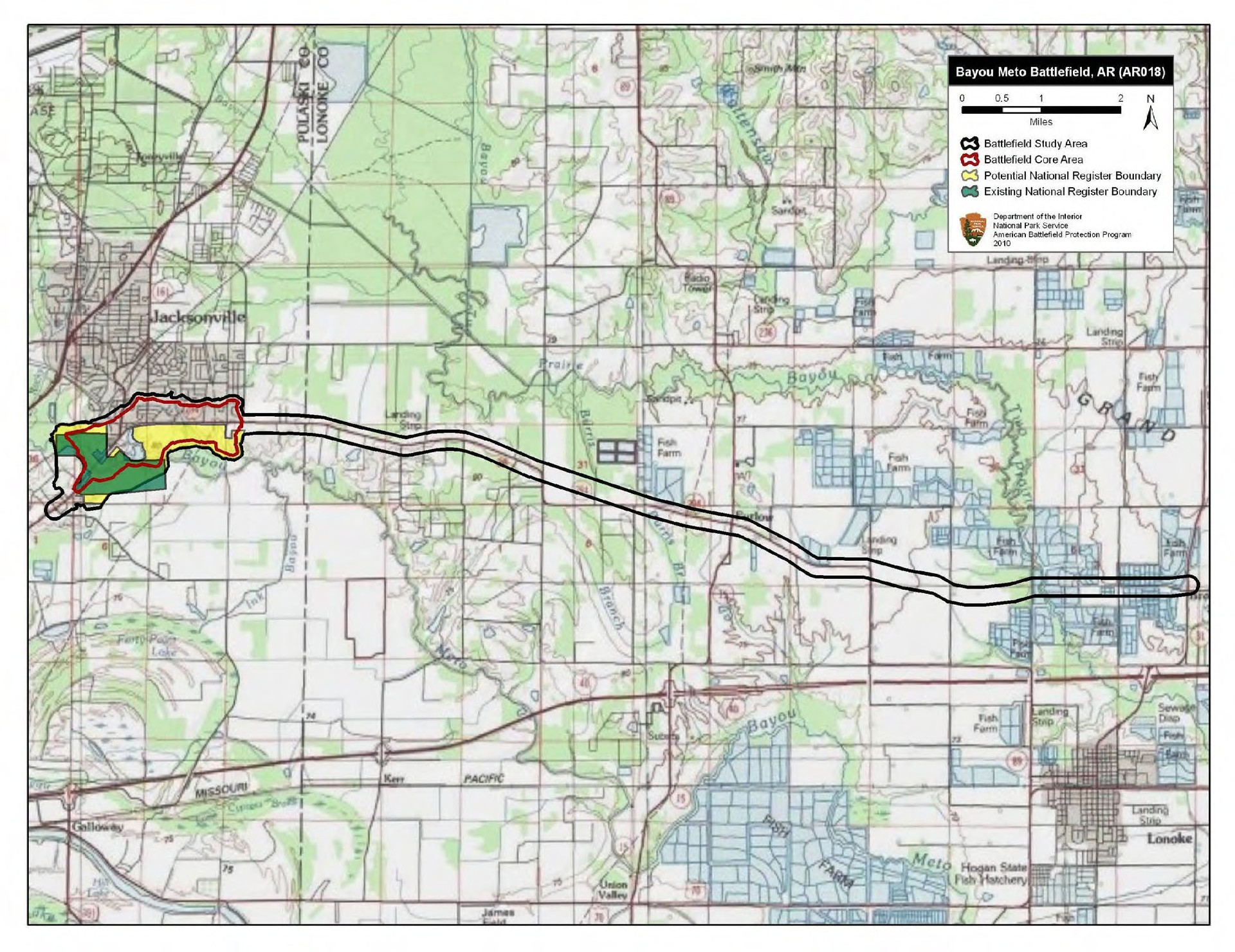
Map of battlefield core and study areas

The Confederate position at Bayou Meto was near the present-day location of Jacksonville, Arkansas. A small skirmish was fought there on August 26, but the next day saw Davidson advance with his main force. The action began when part of the 10th Illinois Cavalry Regiment ran into Confederate soldiers 5 miles (8 km) from the bayou. The Illinois cavalrymen forced the Confederates to retreat for 2 miles (3 km), and then the rest of Colonel John Montgomery Glover's brigade was deployed. Marmaduke had Shelby's Iron Brigade (commanded at this time by B. Frank Gordon) and a brigade commanded by Colonel William L. Jeffers arrayed between the Union troops and the bayou. A Union attack drove the Confederates back to defenses constructed in front of the bayou, and Marmaduke's men were driven back across the bridge by an attack from the 3rd Missouri Cavalry Regiment and the 32nd Iowa Infantry Regiment.

With his troops across Bayou Meto, Marmaduke had the bridge burned. A charge by the Union 1st Iowa Cavalry Regiment failed, and two sides took up positions stretching along Bayou Meto. Davidson then deployed his artillery. Much of the rest of the fighting was back-and-forth artillery dueling that claimed the life of a Confederate artillery officer, prompting Marmaduke to mass his artillery against the Union guns, hoping to exact revenge on the Union cannon. Despite being outgunned, the Confederates were able to significantly reduce the accuracy of the Union fire through well-placed shots. Part of the Confederate force had been cut off on the far side of the bayou during the early retreat across the bridge, and they were forced across the water by the 10th Illinois Cavalry. Davidson missed the opportunity to attack Marmaduke's weak right flank, and then retired at sunset to Brownsville. The Union force had lost either seven men killed and 38 wounded or a total of 46 men during the battle. Full Confederate losses are not known, but at least two men were killed, in addition to several wounded.

== Aftermath ==
Despite winning the battle, during the night of August 27/28, the Confederates left the field, taking up a new position less than 5 miles (8.0 km) from Little Rock. The historian Albert E. Castel writes that Price forfeited his best opportunity to defeat Steele by withdrawing from the Bayou Meto line. During the fighting, Marmaduke had sent Walker a note asking him to hold a conference at the battlefield, as Marmaduke did not feel that he could leave his force during the battle. Walker neither came nor replied; the relationship between the two officers worsened, culminating in Walker's death in the Marmaduke-Walker duel on September 6. Steele joined Davidson at Brownsville on September 2, and the Union force crossed Bayout Meto on September 6. The next day, Steele reached the Arkansas River, and fought the Skirmish at Ashley's Mills. Davidson pushed his cavalry across the river via pontoon bridges on the morning of September 10. Marmaduke fought the Battle of Bayou Fourche against Davidson that day, buying Price time to withdraw from the city, which was surrendered to the Union by its civil government at 19:00. The Confederates had already left, and eventually withdrew to Arkadelphia.

== Battlefield preservation ==
Part of the battlefield was added to the National Register of Historic Places on December 31, 2002, as the Bayou Meto Battlefield.
