= Little Rock Creek =

Little Rock Creek may refer to:

- Little Rock Creek (Los Angeles County, California)
- Little Rock Creek (Minnesota River), a stream in Minnesota
- Little Rock Creek (Mississippi River), a stream in Minnesota
- Little Rock Creek (Red Lake), a stream in Minnesota
- Little Rock Creek (Montana)
