= Little Rock order of battle =

Little Rock order of battle may refer to:

- Little Rock campaign order of battle, for the Union advance on Little Rock, Arkansas, in 1863
  - Battle of Bayou Fourche order of battle, for the battle also known as the Battle of Little Rock, part of the campaign

== See also ==
- Little Rock (disambiguation)
