= Marmaduke–Walker duel =

1863 duel between Confederate generals

Coordinates: 34°45′13″N 92°13′07″W

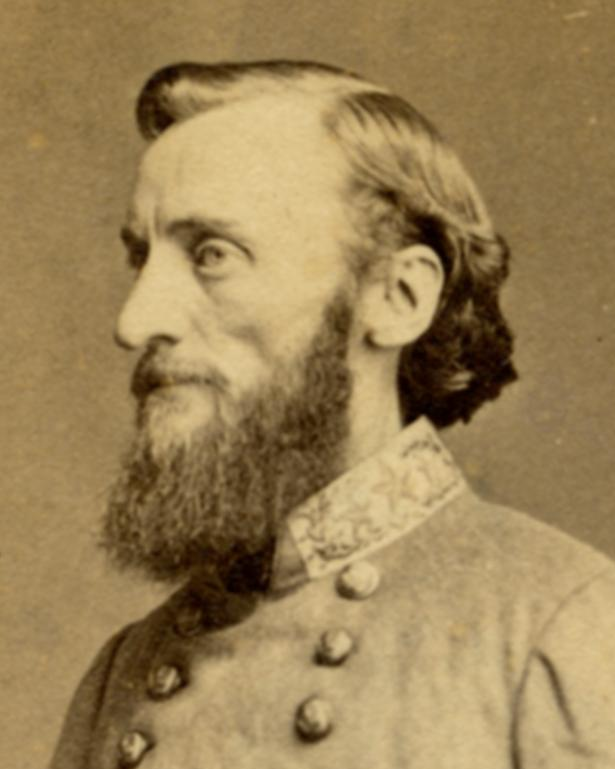
John S. Marmaduke

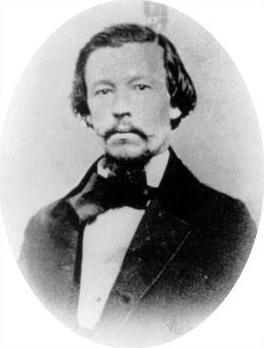
Lucius M. Walker

On September 6, 1863, near Little Rock, Arkansas, a duel was fought between John S. Marmaduke and Lucius M. Walker, two generals in the Confederate States Army. Tension had risen between the two officers during the Battle of Helena on July 4, 1863, when Marmaduke accused Walker of not supporting his force, and then retaliated by not informing Walker of a Confederate retreat. Marmaduke was later assigned to serve under Walker during a Union advance against Little Rock. Walker did not support Marmaduke during a retreat after the Battle of Brownsville, and Marmaduke questioned Walker's courage after the Battle of Bayou Meto on August 27. A series of notes passed between the two generals by friends resulted in a duel, during which Marmaduke fatally wounded Walker. Marmaduke was arrested and charged with murder but was soon released, and later the charge was dropped. He survived the war and later became Governor of Missouri. Union forces captured Little Rock later in the campaign, after the Battle of Bayou Fourche.

== Background ==
Map showing significant locations in the leadup to the duel

John S. Marmaduke was born near Arrow Rock, Missouri, in 1833. Educated at Yale and Harvard, he graduated from West Point in 1857, serving in the United States Army, including service in the Utah War, until he resigned in 1861 at the outbreak of the American Civil War. He then served in a pro-Confederate militia organization in Missouri, until he resigned to join the Confederate States Army after the Battle of Boonville, which was fought on June 17. After serving as a lieutenant colonel in an Arkansas unit, he was the colonel of the 3rd Confederate Infantry Regiment at the Battle of Shiloh, where he was wounded; this caused him to miss several months of combat. He was promoted to brigadier general on November 15, 1862. Marmaduke returned to fight in the Battle of Prairie Grove, and in 1863, led two raids into Missouri and fought at the Battle of Helena in Arkansas.

Lucius M. Walker, a relative of President of the United States James Knox Polk, was born at Columbia, Tennessee, in 1829. He graduated from West Point in 1850, although he resigned his military commission in 1852 to enter commerce at Memphis, Tennessee. After entering Confederate service in 1861, he became lieutenant colonel of the 40th Tennessee Infantry Regiment before being promoted to its colonel on November 11, 1861. Serving at Memphis, he became a brigadier general; the promotion was backdated to March 11, 1862, for seniority purposes. (Note: The Confederate army used the effective date of promotion to a rank to decide who was senior when two generals had the same nominal rank. The man whose date of promotion was earlier was considered to be senior to, and so able to give orders to, the other.) After missing Shiloh due to illness, he served at the Siege of Corinth and the Battle of Farmington. Walker developed a poor relationship with Braxton Bragg, the commander of the Army of Tennessee, and Bragg did not trust Walker's generalship. He was transferred to the Trans-Mississippi Department, where he reported for duty in March 1863. He fought in the Battle of Helena, commanding a cavalry brigade.

During the fighting at Helena on July 4, 1863, Walker's brigade was supposed to protect the left flank of Marmaduke's position. During the Confederate attacks, Marmaduke's men were halted by enfilade fire, and Walker, who was concerned about the safety of his own left flank, did not move to support Marmaduke's. In turn, an angry Marmaduke chose not to inform Walker when the Confederates retreated. As a result, many of Walker's men were almost captured by a Union counterattack. In his report, Walker said he properly protected Marmaduke's flank, but when Lieutenant General Theophilus Holmes issued his overall report for the battle, he wrote that Walker failed to protect Marmaduke's flank and did not provide a good reason for this, while Marmaduke blamed Walker for his failure to capture his objective. These events at Helena led to animosity between Walker and Marmaduke.

== Duel ==
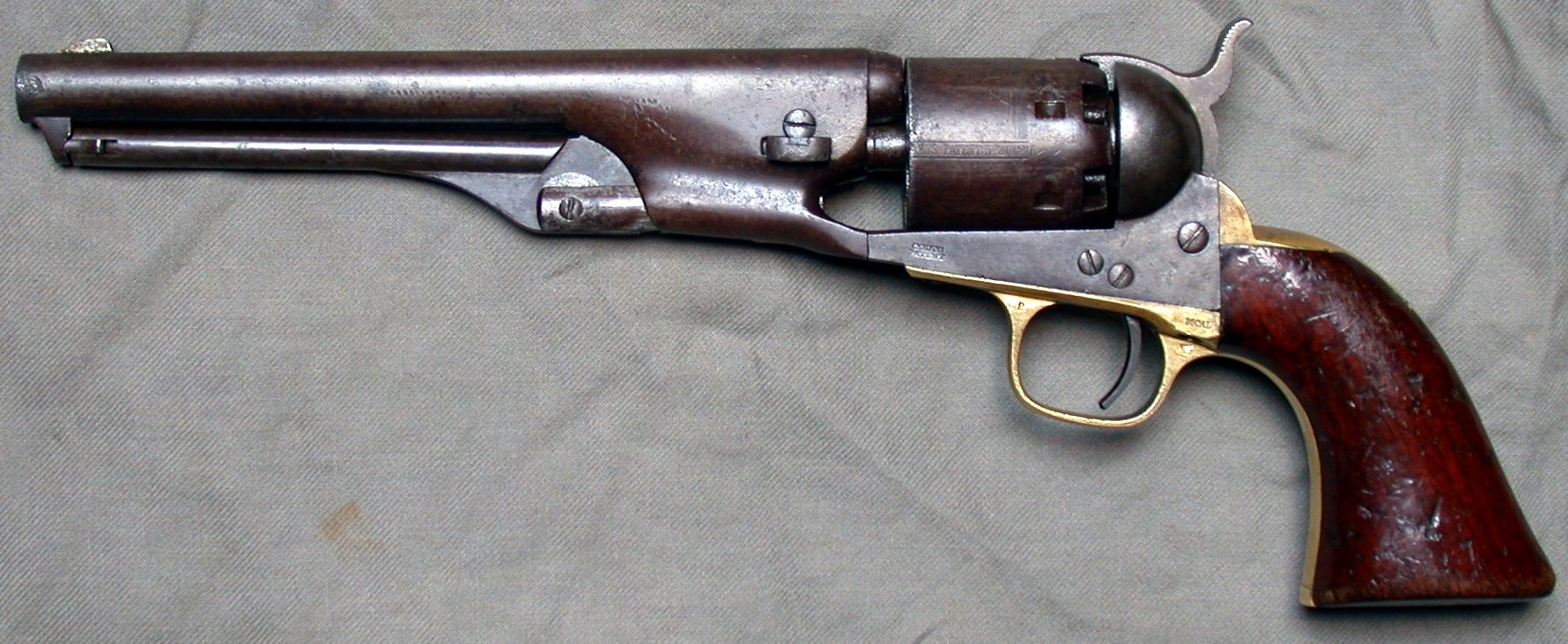
A Model 1861 Colt Navy revolver, the type of weapon used during the duel

In July 1863, Union Major General Frederick Steele took command of Union forces in Arkansas, headquartered out of Helena. Steele wanted to gain control of the Arkansas River, and the Confederates knew that an attack against the city of Little Rock was likely. When Holmes fell ill, command at Little Rock passed to Major General Sterling Price. Price ordered new defenses constructed, and sent the cavalry forces of both Marmaduke and Walker to separately observe and interfere with Union movements. Steele's men left Helena on August 10 and 11 and were reinforced by cavalry commanded by Brigadier General John W. Davidson along the way. With his men wracked by disease, Steele decided to move to a location considered to be healthier, while sending Davidson to cross the Arkansas River with his cavalry. On August 23, Price had Marmaduke join Walker's force; Walker took command as he was above Marmaduke on the seniority lists.

Davidson's men drove Marmaduke's command back in an action near Brownsville on August 25. During the retreat from Brownsville, Marmaduke and Walker made a plan whereby Marmaduke's men would halt and draw the Union troops into some woods, from which Walker's men would attack. When Marmaduke made his stand, he came close to capture, as Walker continued to retreat and left Marmaduke's men isolated. Two days later, in the Battle of Bayou Meto, the Confederates held off the Union troops and burned the bridge across the Bayou Meto River. Despite this victory, the Confederates withdrew to a position less than 5 miles (8.0 km) from Little Rock that night. Marmaduke had wanted to meet with Walker during the fighting at Bayou Meto, but did not want to leave his troops during a battle, so he asked Walker to come to the front. Walker neither came nor replied, which angered Marmaduke. He asked for a transfer from under Walker, planning to resign if his request was declined; Price granted the transfer request. Two days after the Bayou Meto fight, one of Marmaduke's aides reportedly stated at Walker's headquarters that Marmaduke claimed he had "won the fight at [Bayou Meto]", as well as claiming that Walker "had acted the damned coward". Despite another one of Marmaduke's aides claiming that the statements had not been made, Walker believed that they had.

Walker asked Marmaduke for an explanation of the comments. The communication occurred through a series of notes, which were passed between the two generals by friends: John C. Moore for Marmaduke and Robert H. Crockett, a grandson of Davy Crockett, for Walker. In the notes, Marmaduke stated that Walker's conduct after Bayou Meto and Brownsville was the reason for his transfer request, and that he had not used the word "coward" but, in the words of historian Helen Trimpi, "would be responsible for any inference that might be drawn on his remarks". Marmaduke also stated that he believed Walker had displayed "somewhat more than prudent care in the avoidance of all positions of danger" during the Battle of Bayou Meto. Walker did not view Marmaduke's explanations as satisfactory. The exchanges resulted in an agreement to hold a duel, despite dueling being illegal in Arkansas. Sources disagree as to whether the duel was proposed by Walker and accepted by Marmaduke, or arranged by Crockett and Moore without consulting the two generals beforehand. The terms of the duel specified that each man would be accompanied by a second, another friend, and two doctors. The weapons used were six-shot Colt Navy revolvers, (Note: Variously stated to have been Model 1861 revolvers or Model 1851 revolvers.) using the round version of Colt's Navy revolver bullets, which could also shoot conical projectiles. It would be fought at a distance of 15 paces, and would continue until either five minutes had passed, all of the loaded rounds had been fired or someone was hit. Historian Dick Steward noted that the distance of 15 paces was quite close given the weapons used, and suggests that the duel took place at such close range because Marmaduke was nearsighted. Marmaduke's second was Moore, and Walker's was Crockett.

That night, Price learned of the planned duel, and ordered the two officers to remain at their headquarters for the next day. Walker did not receive the order, and Marmaduke ignored it. The duel took place on the morning of September 6, at a farm 7 miles (11 km) from Little Rock and north of the Arkansas River. Both men's first rounds missed, but Marmaduke's second shot hit Walker, whose weapon discharged while he fell. Crockett declared the duel over, and he knelt by Walker, who told him he was dying. The shot had hit Walker's right kidney and embedded in his spine, paralyzing him from the waist down. A doctor pronounced the wound mortal, and Walker was transported back in an ambulance brought by Marmaduke, which reached the city at about 10:00. Walker died the next day. Price had Marmaduke and both officers' seconds arrested, with Marmaduke's arrest being for murder. However, with the campaign ongoing and Marmaduke's subordinate officers asking for his release, Marmaduke's arrest was canceled and he was placed in command of Price's cavalry. All charges against Marmaduke were later dropped. The duel and its results caused Confederate morale to deteriorate and led to a poorer relationship between Marmaduke and Price. According to the historian Diana Sherwood, this was the "last duel of note" that took place in Arkansas. The details of the duel were not completely reported until Crockett published his account in the late 1880s.

== Aftermath ==
On September 9 and 10, Davidson pushed three cavalry brigades across the Arkansas River, and Steele moved his men along the north bank of the river on September 10. At 11:00, Price pulled his troops back across the river, and began to evacuate the city. Marmaduke fought the Battle of Bayou Fourche, which bought time for Price to complete the withdrawal, and the Confederates were out of the city by 17:00. The city's civilian government surrendered to the Union forces at 19:00. During the fighting at Bayou Fourche, Colonel Archibald S. Dobbins, who had replaced Walker, refused to obey Marmaduke's order to charge, and was arrested, although Price later released him. Marmaduke continued to serve in the Confederate army after the duel, and was captured during the Battle of Mine Creek on October 25, 1864. While in Union captivity, he was promoted to major general. After the war, he was involved in business, journalism, and served as a member of the Missouri Railway Commission. Marmaduke was elected Governor of Missouri in 1884, and served until his death in 1887. A commemorative plaque was erected at the site of the duel in 2015.

== See also ==
- List of Confederate duels
- List of duels in the United States
