= Battle of Bayou Fourche =

1863 battle of the American Civil War

- Part of the American Civil War
Date	September 10, 1863 (163 years ago)
Location	Pulaski County (present-day Little Rock and North Little Rock), Arkansas 34°43′19.1″N 92°12′05.4″W
Result	Union victory

Belligerents
United States (Union)	Confederate States

Commanders and leaders
(United States) Frederick Steele: John W. Davidson	(Confederate States of America) John S. Marmaduke: Archibald S. Dobbins; James C. Tappan

Units involved
Army of Arkansas	District of Arkansas

Casualties and losses
72 dead and wounded	64 dead and wounded
- Location in Arkansas

The Battle of Bayou Fourche, also known as the Battle of Little Rock, was a battle of the American Civil War fought between Union and Confederate forces on September 10, 1863, in Pulaski County (present-day Little Rock and North Little Rock), Arkansas. It was the final battle of the Little Rock Campaign, resulting in the Federal occupation of Little Rock.

A Union force commanded by Major General Frederick Steele had begun an advance from Helena, Arkansas, west towards Little Rock in August. The campaign met light resistance aside from the Battle of Bayou Meto, while Confederate troops under Major General Sterling Price built fortifications on the other side of the Arkansas River from Little Rock.

To avoid a direct assault on Price's fortifications, Steele split his troops into two wings. Steele and the infantry advanced along the north bank of the Arkansas River, while Brigadier General John W. Davidson and the Federal cavalry crossed the Arkansas River to outflank the Confederates from their fortifications. On the morning of September 10, Davidson's cavalry crossed the river and drove back a Confederate cavalry force commanded by Colonel Archibald S. Dobbins. Dobbins's men fell back to a body of water named Bayou Fourche, where Brigadier General John S. Marmaduke took command of the Confederate forces. The bayou separated the battlefield into two spheres of action, and Davidson advanced with troops on both sides of Bayou Fourche.

After some fighting, the Confederates on the northern portion of the field were driven back and those south of the bayou retreated as well. Price had earlier decided to abandon Little Rock, and the city fell to the Union forces. The state government relocated to Washington, Arkansas, and Price withdrew his command to Arkadelphia.

== Background ==
In early March 1862 during the American Civil War, Union forces defeated Confederate troops in northwestern Arkansas during the Battle of Pea Ridge, after which most Confederate troops were transferred out of Arkansas. During the campaigning following Pea Ridge, Union troops captured the city of Helena, Arkansas, in July 1862. The Confederates rebuilt a significant fighting force in Arkansas, but were defeated at the Battle of Prairie Grove in December. Despite these setbacks, control of the Arkansas River remained in Confederate hands at the close of 1862. On January 11, 1863, Union forces captured Confederate-held Fort Hindman on the Arkansas River in the Battle of Arkansas Post, which was about 25 miles (40 km) from the junction of the Arkansas and Mississippi Rivers. However, instead of pushing up the Arkansas River, the troops were withdrawn to fight in the Vicksburg campaign. Other Union troops stationed in Arkansas were also transferred to the operations against Vicksburg. Confederate forces in Arkansas decided to attempt to draw off some of the pressure on Vicksburg with an assault on Helena. The ensuing Battle of Helena was a bloody Confederate repulse on July 4 in which the Confederates suffered over 1,600 casualties. Vicksburg surrendered the same day.

Significant sites in the Little Rock campaign

The fall of Vicksburg freed up Union troops for an offensive against the Arkansas River Valley and Little Rock, the state capital. Defending the region was the Confederate District of Arkansas, which was under the command of the ill Lieutenant General Theophilus Holmes, who turned command over to Major General Sterling Price on July 23. On paper, the Confederates had about 32,000 men in the district, but only 14,500 had been present for duty before Helena. Expecting an assault, Price repositioned his forces and began building fortifications across the Arkansas River from Little Rock. Price believed that he could only defend Little Rock against greater Union numbers if his fortifications were directly attacked, but this was unlikely as the Arkansas River was readily crossable at several points in the area. The flanks of Price's fortified position were covered by a swamp on one side and the Arkansas River on the other.

Federal cavalry commanded by Brigadier General John W. Davidson moved out from Wittsburg on August 1, reaching Clarendon on August 9. Another Union force, composed of infantry, cavalry, and artillery, left Helena on August 11, under the command of Major General Frederick Steele. Steele's command numbered about 7,000 men, and Davidson's about 6,000. The two forces joined at Clarendon, with Steele's men arriving in stages beginning on August 15. The overall command was known as the Army of Arkansas. Steele's men were drawn from elements of the XIII Corps and the XVI Corps and were organized into two divisions, while Davidson's division was taken from the Department of Missouri.

The Union units suffered badly from disease, but met only minor resistance with the exception of the August 27 Battle of Bayou Meto. After a pause beginning of September 2, the Union forces resumed their advance on September 6, reaching the Arkansas River the next day and winning the Skirmish at Ashley's Mills. Steele decided not to directly assault Price's fortifications on the north side of the Arkansas River, instead planning on having his infantry advance along the north bank of the river while Davidson and the cavalry crossed the Arkansas River and forced the Confederates to abandon the fortifications by outflanking them. Construction of a pontoon bridge across the river began on September 9.

== Battle ==
The Confederate cavalry was greatly outnumbered by Davidson's men on the other side of the river, and were forced to thinly guard a long line of potential crossing sites with only about 1,200 men. On the morning of September 10 at about daybreak, Confederate cannons from Etter's Arkansas Battery and part of Pratt's Texas Battery fired on the pontoon bridge, but were driven off by Union artillery fire. Confederate sharpshooters kept up fire on the bridge, but it was completed at about 10:00 am. Davidson feinted at another crossing about 2 miles (3.2 km) downstream, and drove the sharpshooters away with two infantry regiments and artillery fire. By 11:00 am, Davidson's division was across the river. At around this same time, Price began withdrawing his men from the fortifications across the river from Little Rock. At this stage of the campaign, Price had 7,749 men present for duty although only about 1,250 of them were opposing Davidson. Both wings of Steele's force combined to 10,477 men.

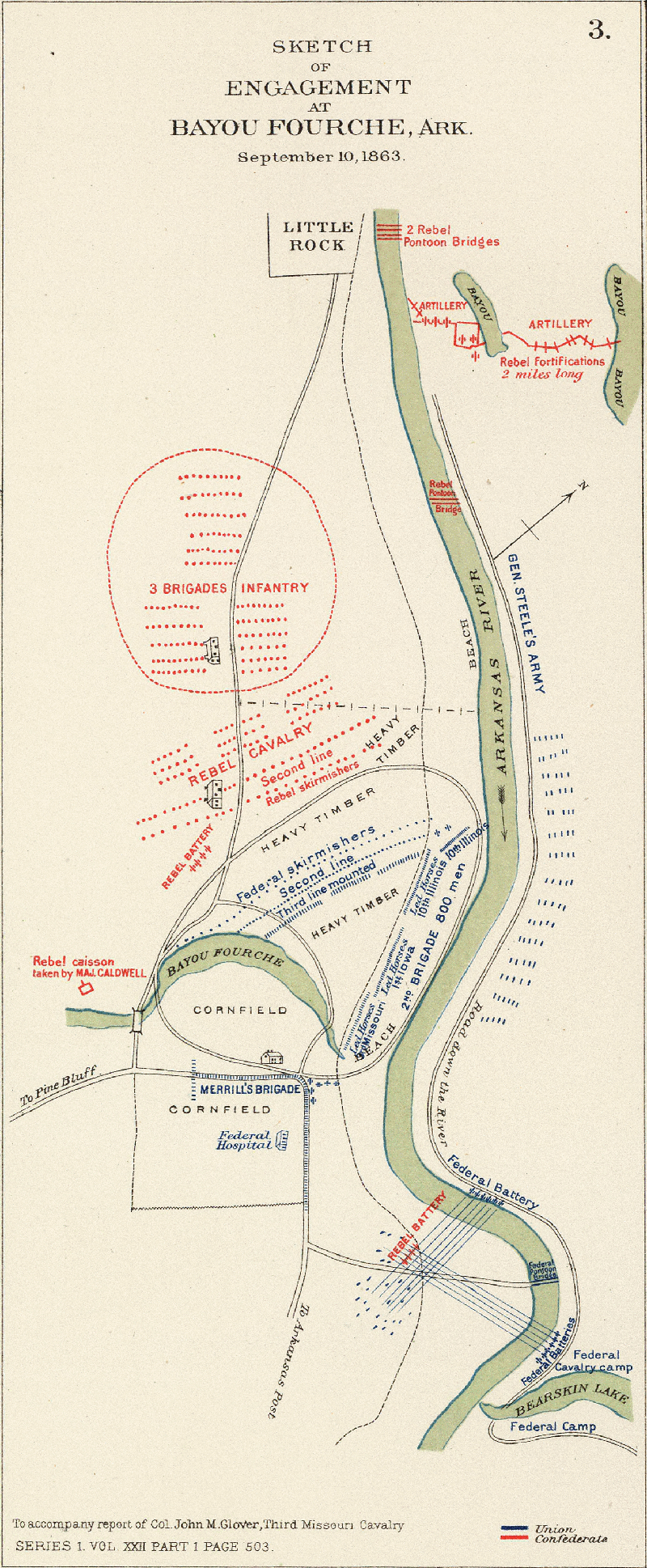
Sketch of Engagement at Bayou Fourche, Arkansas, September 10, 1863. To accompany report of Col. John M. Glover, Third Missouri Cavalry.

Davidson's division consisted of three brigades, with those of Colonels John M. Glover and Lewis Merrill in the advance. These two brigades numbered about 2,000 men. Glover's men were first the advance, driving back Confederate cavalry which was commanded by Colonel Archibald S. Dobbins. Dobbins's men were driven back to Bayou Fourche, a tributary of Fourche Creek. There Dobbins ordered 500 men commanded by Colonel Robert C. Newton to make a stand. This position was a few miles from Little Rock. Price reinforced Dobbins with men from Brigadier General John S. Marmaduke's division. Marmaduke had recently killed Dobbins's former commanding officer, Brigadier General Lucius M. Walker, in the Marmaduke-Walker duel; Dobbins refused to serve under Marmaduke and was placed under arrest by the latter although he was soon freed by Price. Newton temporarily took command of Dobbins's division.

The road the Union soldiers were traveling on forked near where Bayou Fourche entered the Arkansas River. The bayou ran between the two forks of the road. Glover sent the 10th Illinois Cavalry Regiment on the right fork to the north of the bayou, while the 1st Iowa Cavalry Regiment deployed on the left fork to the south of the bayou. When Merrill arrived, his brigade was ordered to the left wing. The terrain north of the bayou was wooded and was defended by three regiments and a battalion from Marmaduke's division under the command of Colonel William Jeffers. The ground bordering the Arkansas River was a sandy beach. Jeffers's veteran troops included the 8th Missouri Cavalry Regiment and Greene's Missouri Cavalry Regiment. On the Union left, opposing Merrill, were Newton's Confederates; this part of the battlefield included a cornfield in front of the Confederate lines. Newton's force was a mixture of Arkansas, Missouri, Texas, and Louisiana troops and were positioned behind the bayou's west levee. Merrill advanced the 8th Missouri Cavalry Regiment, which found the 1st Iowa engaged with Newton's Confederates. The 7th Missouri Cavalry Regiment of Merrill's brigade was detached to support an artillery battery and did not participate in the battle. Glover sent the 10th Illinois forward, along with Lovejoy's Missouri Battery, but the Federal cavalry was repulsed after driving back Confederate skirmishers. Lovejoy's battery was left without support and was overrun by a charge made by Jeffers's men.

Glover changed his tactics and had the 10th Illinois and 3rd Missouri Cavalry Regiment fight dismounted, and he also had the 1st Iowa brought over from the Union left. While Glover slowly pushed Jeffers back, Merrill advanced his men but came under fire from Pratt's battery. Part of the 25th Ohio Battery was deployed to counter the Confederate artillery fire, but the Ohio battery's fire produced little effect and the battery was withdrawn. Bayou Fourche created communication problems for Glover and Merrill; at one point Merill's men came under fire from their rear and Merrill feared that his position was being flanked. Instead, after investigation, the fire turned out to be overshots from Glover's fight with Jeffers.

At around 1:00 pm, Shelby's Iron Brigade reinforced the Confederate, under the command of Colonel Gideon W. Thompson. However, they came under enfilade fire from Steele's artillery across the river. Confederate infantry reinforcements also arrived, but the effect of Steele's artillery fire prevented a counterattack from occurring. Glover's men broke through the Confederate line, and swept into the rear of Newton's position; the Confederates withdrew. Glover accused Merrill's men of advancing too cautiously, while Merrill claimed that his brigade's slow advance had been due to unfamiliarity with the terrain. The Union lost 72 men during the battle; Confederate losses are not known.

== Aftermath ==
Price had ordered Little Rock abandoned after he learned that Davidson had crossed the river. Bridges, train cars, and the gunboat CSS Pontchartrain were destroyed to prevent the Union from capturing them. Glover's men began a pursuit from Bayou Fourche to Little Rock, but were too fatigued to make it to the city. Davidson's third brigade under Colonel John Ritter along with the 1st Iowa finishing the movement into Little Rock. Both Davidson's cavalry and Steele's infantry met little resistance from the Confederates. The state government relocated to Washington, Arkansas, and Price fell back to Arkadelphia. The Union captured the Little Rock Arsenal, as well as five abandoned cannons. The Confederate troops were especially demoralized by the fall of the city, and many Confederate soldiers deserted after the campaign.

== Battlefield preservation ==
Remaining portions of the Bayou Fourche Battlefield are threatened by development. The eastern engagement area where the Federal cavalry crossed the Arkansas River is being converted for lakeside residential uses. If the remaining unprotected portions of the American Civil War battlefield are to be preserved, immediate coordination is needed among local, state, and national advocates and heritage tourism proponents.

== See also ==
- List of American Civil War battles
- List of battles 1801–1900
- Troop engagements of the American Civil War, 1863
