= Arkansas Register of Historic Places =

Historic status

Arkansas Register of Historic Places (ARHPs) are sites, structures, buildings, landscaped areas and objects in the state of Arkansas that have been determined to have statewide architectural, cultural or historical significance.

== Administration ==
The Arkansas Historic Preservation Program (AHPP) nominates properties for inclusion in the ARHP; completing a nomination often started by the property owner or a local community and submitting it to an eleven-member selection board who reviews the submittals and makes a recommendation on the property's inclusion. The selection board consists of appointees serving at the pleasure of the Governor of Arkansas.

== Criteria ==
Structures of sound design, construction, feeling and association which are usually at least 50 years old are compared against the following criteria for inclusion on the register:

1. Association with events of state or local historical significance
2. Association with the lives of persons of significance in the history of the state or locality
3. Represent a type, style or period of architecture
4. Association with important elements of Arkansas's history or pre-history

== Properties ==
Name	Image	Address	City	County	Built	Date Added
American Legion Building - TAC House		1101 North West Avenue	El Dorado	Union	1949	8/2/2017
Antioch Missionary Baptist Church		County Rd. 781	Sherrill vic.	Jefferson	1918	9/4/1994
Applegate House		2301 SW 2nd Street	Bentonville	Benton	1966-1968	4/5/2006
Arsenic Spring Building		103 Mt. Ida St.	Hot Springs	Garland	ca. 1890-1953	9/1/1999
Arthur Daniel Malone House		Address Restricted	Plumerville	Conway	c.1883	12/2/2009
Ashley's and Jones' Station Battlefield		Beginning near Bayou Two Prairie west of Carlisle and running 10.8 miles along U.S. 70 to Hazen	Carlisle	Lonoke	August 24, 1864	4/1/2009
Barron-Craig House		16484 12th St.	Paron	Saline	c. 1857	9/7/2000
Baxter-Dixon House		212 Spring St.	Melbourne	Izard	1883	6/2/1995
Bayou Meto Schoolhouse		1178 Highway 276	Bayou Meto	Arkansas	1932	4/2/2003
Bear Creek Church		County Road 224 (Bear Creek Cemetery Road)	Evening Shade vic.	Sharp	c. 1917	3/3/1995
Beard House		1890 Pumpkin Hill Road	Rison vic.	Cleveland	c.1870	12/5/2012
Beebe Colored School		802 East Ohio Street	Beebe	White	1944	8/3/2022
Belleville United Methodist Church		intersection of US 59 and State Highway 317	Lockesburg	Sevier	1904-1905,	8/1/2012
Belmont Missionary Baptist Church and Cemetery		8420 Belmont Road	Moscow	Jefferson	1901-1961	12/4/2019
Bethel Methodist Church		Southeast corner of AR 57 and Bethel Road	Mount Holly	Union	c.1875	8/4/2010
Bethel Methodist Episcopal Church		1384 Old Highway 64	Crawfordsville	Crittenden	1917	8/3/2016
Boggy Bayou Farm		Highway 4	Arkansas City vic.	Desha	1932	12/3/1997
Boyhood Home of William “Bill” Jefferson Blythe III (Bill Clinton)		321 East Thirteenth Street	Hope	Hempstead	1951-1953	12/2/2015
Brown Duke Snack Shop			Magnolia	Columbia	1948	8/1/2018
Brown House		306 Market St.	Stamps	Lafayette	1889-1890	6/5/1996
Bruce House		1102 S. Pulaski St.	Little Rock	Pulaski	c. 1916	12/2/1998
Bush House		111 Daley Terrace	Hot Springs	Garland	c.1957	8/2/2017
Byrd Memorial		West side of Poole Circle	Gray Rock	Logan	1918	12/2/2015
Camp Chaffee 125th Armored Engineer Battalion Archway and Stone Sidewalk		Intersection of Mahogany Avenue and Kansas Street	Fort Smith	Sebastian	1943	8/5/2020
Campbell Station Cabin #2		.05 miles from the Intersection of Hwy 67 and Campbell Lane	Campbell Station	Jackson	c.1941	8/1/2012
Captain Daniel Matthews House		335 Elizabeth Avenue	Osceola	Mississippi	c.1890	12/6/2017
Charcoal Gap Tunnel		Approximately 1/4 mile north of 200 Valhalla Drive	Eureka Springs vic.	Carroll	c.1900	4/4/2007
Chester E. Bush House		1524 S. Ringo St.	Little Rock	Pulaski	c. 1917	12/2/1998
Clarksville to Van Buren Road, Highway 352 Segment		Highway 352	Ozark vic.	Franklin	1834, 1838	4/1/2009
Columbus and Delia Hudson Farm		375 AR 123 N	Mt. Judea vic.	Newton	1921-1955	8/3/2005
Cord-Charlotte School Building		225 School Road	Charlotte	Independence	1936-1937	4/6/2011
Cotton Boll Stadium		East side of Scogin Drive, north of Weevil Drive	Monticello	Drew	1936	4/5/2023
Crash Site of AC 41-7441		south of Pinnacle Valley Road	Maumelle vic.	Pulaski	1942	4/4/2007
Cross Roads School and Masonic Lodge		Highway 167	Cross Roads	Grant	1881	9/2/1998
Czech National Cemetery		Czech Cemetery Rd., 1 mile west of U.S. 63	Hazen vic.	Prairie	1894-1960	12/1/2010
Davies Cemetery		Lake Hall Road	Lake Village vic.	Chicot	c. 1837-c. 1930	3/4/1998
Dierks Lumber Company Building		308 4th Street	Mountain Pine	Garland	1927	4/4/2018
Douglas Cemetery		1/2 mile N of Highfill on Douglas Cemetery Rd.	Highfill	Benton	1858-1952	7/10/2002
Dr. Herbert H. McAdams House		300 East Nettleton Avenue	Jonesboro	Craighead	c.1913	12/5/2018
Draper Cemetery Site		Cross County Road 747	Colt	Cross	1866-1903	12/5/2012
Edgar Wright Farmstead		117 Yankee Road	Judsonia	White	1921	8/5/2015
Edward Downie House		2119 W. 19th St.	Little Rock	Pulaski	1910	9/2/1998
Edwards Chapel Christian Church		224 South Independence Avenue	Russellville	Pope	1939	12/6/2017
Ellis Building		208 North Block Avenue	Fayetteville	Washington	c.1923	4/4/2018
Emma Elease Webb Community Center		433 Pleasant Street	Hot Springs	Garland	c.1918	9/2/1998
Eureka Missionary Baptist Church		721 Gaines Avenue	Hot Springs	Garland	1906	12/4/2013
Fairview Gymnasium		Mount Holly Road	Camden	Ouachita	1937	4/7/2021
Fakes-Bull House		304 Jackson St.	McCrory	Woodruff	1905-1907	9/3/1997
Fayetteville Municipal Airport Hangar ("White Hangar")		East of Hwy. 71	Fayetteville	Washington	1943-44	6/5/1996
Fellowship Cemetery		Columbia County Rd. 34	Calhoun vic.	Columbia	1854-1935	3/6/2002
First Baptist Church		311 Fordyce St.	Keo	Lonoke	1903	4/7/2004
First Baptist Church		306 E. Cross St.	Forrest City	St.Francis	1914	3/3/1995
First Missionary Baptist Church		313 South New Orleans Street	Brinkley	Monroe	1909	8/5/2009
Fitzhugh's Woods Battlefield		Address Restricted	Address Restricted	Woodruff	April 1, 1864	12/3/2003
Forrest Apartments		204 Exchange Street	Hot Springs	Garland	c.1930	4/5/2023
Fort #2 Rifle Pits		Address Restricted	Fort Smith	Sebastian	1864	1/31/2002
Fourche Bayou Battlefield		East of Willow Beach Lake to east of Little Rock National Airport	Little Rock and North Little Rock	Pulaski	1863	4/7/2010
Fowler Cemetery		183 Scratch Gravel Road	Damascus	VanBuren	1903-1971	8/5/2020
Freeman Cemetery		1/8 mile south of Highway 108	Alleene vic.	Little River	1855-1957	12/5/2007
Galatia Church		West side of AR 5 north of the Havner Road and AR 5 intersection.	Norfork	Baxter	c.1900	8/1/2018
Gibson Court Tourist Court Historic District		903 Park Ave.	Hot Springs	Garland	ca. 1940	12/3/2003
Gillham School		102 North 2nd Street	Gillham	Sevier	1939	4/3/2019
Goad Springs Cemetery		361 South Goad Springs Road	Lowell vic.	Benton	1853-1965	12/2/2015
Governor J. M. Futrell House		130 South 14th Street	Paragould	Greene	1908-1938	4/5/2006
Gravel Hill Cemetery		Clay County Rd. 336	St. Francis vic.	Clay	1869-1952	11/5/2002
H.L. Mitchell/Clay East Building		Main Street	Tyronza	Poinsett	1927	12/9/1994
Hall Cemetery		Clay County Rd. 347	St. Francis vic.	Clay	1871-1952	11/5/2002
Hampton-Kervin House		1922 Highway 229	Fordyce vic.	Dallas	c.1861	8/2/2006
Hankins Country Store		38539 AR 7 North	Pelsor	Pope	c.1930	8/7/2013
Harrell Cemetery		West of Cincinnati Creek Road, two miles northeast of AR 59	Cincinnati vic.	Washington	1863-1941	4/4/2018
Heagler House		904 Skyline Drive	North Little Rock	Pulaski	1929	12/3/2014
Heathcock-Jones House		Old Dallas Road	Norman vic.	Montgomery	c. 1845	6/2/1995
Heffelfinger-Freund House		1408 East Rockwood Trail	Fayetteville	Washington	1955	4/3/2019
Henry Madison Wood Farmstead		3300 Leo Ammons Road	Fayetteville vic.	Washington	c. 1870-c. 1895	12/3/1997
Herring-Hunt House		306 W. Elm St.	Warren	Bradley	1900	9/4/1994
Hooten Log Cabin		335 Snead Drive	Fairfield Bay	VanBuren	c.1870	8/2/2023
Hughes Cemetery		End of South Richards Street	Benton	Saline	c.1858-1967	8/17/2019
Ida Waldran House		1817 Bruce Street	Conway	Faulkner	c.1924	4/7/2010
Independence School		921 E. Fourth St.	Stuttgart	Arkansas	1914	12/2/1998
Ira E. Moore House		106 Amis Street	Rison	Cleveland	1917	12/4/2013
Iven & Alberta Horn Burnham House		18 Old Bank Road	New Blaine	Logan	1909	12/7/2005
J. W. Calaway House		707 East Magnolia Street	Rison	Cleveland	1928-1929	4/5/2023
James Phillip Smith House		510 West Sevier Street	Benton	Saline	c.1885	12/5/2018
Jerome Japanese American Relocation Center		U.S. 165	Jerome	Drew	1942-1944	8/4/2010
Jim & Lizzie Bell Horn House		15 Old Bank Road	New Blaine	Logan	1896	12/7/2005
Kantz House		4820 Mission Blvd.	Fayetteville	Washington	1880-1881	9/1/1999
Kirkpatrick Cemetery		Southeast corner of AR Highway 5 North and Marketplace Avenue	Bryant	Saline	1850-1862	8/5/2009
Koon Building #7		Highway 167	Sheridan	Grant	c. 1940	4/7/1999
Koon House #5		Highway 167	Sheridan	Grant	c. 1940	4/7/1999
Lafayette School Gymnasium		450 Smith Street	Camden	Ouachita	c.1950	12/6/2017
Lake June		South of the intersection of Mill Pond Road and Magnolia Street	Stamps	Lafayette	1880	12/6/2017
Langley Gymnasium		2667 Highway 84 West	Langley	Pike	1950	8/6/2014
Lee Theater		south side 13th Street between Pine and Oak streets	Little Rock	Pulaski	1939	4/6/2016
Leveck House		121 Normandy Road	Little Rock	Pulaski	c.1943	12/5/2018
Levon Helm Boyhood Home		northeast corner of Carruth Avenue and North Elm Street	Marvell	Phillips	c.1950	8/1/2018
Lines Cemetery		At the Scenic Hill Road and Round Mountain Road Intersection	Preston vic.	Faulkner	1878-1930	4/4/2018
Linwood Cemetery		Southeast of the intersection of Highway 49 and Highway 412 (West Kingshighway and Linwood Drive)	Paragould	Greene	1885-1967	8/2/2017
Lion Oil Company Duck Hunting Lodge			Casscoe vic.	Arkansas	1955	4/2/2014
Little House		207 Madison St.	Dell	Mississippi	1923	11/7/2001
Louis Rudolph and Flossie Belle Ritter House		1000 East Nettleton	Jonesboro	Craighead	1926	4/5/2017
Macedonia Cemetery		North side of Waterproof Road west of Salem Cemetery Road	Wattensaw	Lonoke	1909	8/4/2021
Mammoth Spring Methodist Church		415 Main Street	Mammoth Spring	Fulton	1913	4/7/2021
Marshall Strother Gaines House		116 N. Main St.	Greenwood	Sebastian	1877	12/3/2003
Martin-Hudson House		220 Hickory Street	Jacksonville	Pulaski	c.1875	12/1/2010
Massard Prairie Battlefield/6th Kansas Cavalry Camp Site		West of Red Pine and Morgan's Way roads	Fort Smith	Sebastian	1864	11/7/2001
Matilda and Karl Pfeiffer House		1071 Heritage Park Dr.	Piggott	Clay	1931	11/4/2004
McBride General Store		201 North Main Street	Havana	Yell	c.1920	4/6/2022
McNutt House and Cottage		817 and 915 McNutt Street	Arkadelphia	Clark	c.1924	12/05/2018
McRae Methodist Church		106 Wilks Street	McRae	White	1946	8/5/2009
Memphis to Little Rock Road, Blackfish Lake to Hill Lake Segment		Cross County Road 1005 and St. Francis County Road 529	Gladden	St.Francis	1828-1838	12/5/2007
Memphis to Little Rock Road, Highway 306 Segment		Arkansas Highway 306	Pinetree	St.Francis	1828-1838	12/5/2007
Methodist Episcopal Church, South		Main and School Streets	Evening Shade	Sharp	1898-1899	12/3/1997
Military Road - Black's Ferry Road Segment		Black's Ferry Road northwest and southwest of Black's Ferry Bridge	Pocahontas	Randolph	1838	8/1/2007
Military Road, Pitman Road Segment		Pitman Road	Pitman	Randolph	1838	12/5/2007
Mountain Home College Building		NE corner of College and 4th St.	Mountain Home	Baxter	1894	3/6/1996
Mountain View Special School District No. 30 School		204 School Ave.	Mountain View	Stone	1928	12/1/2004
Mt. Olive A.M.E. Church		East side of Bradley County Road 45	Sumpter vic.	Bradley	c.1880	4/6/2016
Mt. Salem Cemetery		Mt. Salem Road 101	Paris vic.	Logan	1872	8/4/2021
Mt. Zion Methodist Episcopal Church South Cemetery		Approximately 2.5 miles southeast of Vanndale on County Road 367	Vanndale vic.	Cross	1857-1957	12/7/2006
Murphy Bros. Machine Shop & Woodworking Building		111 Garden Street	Hot Springs	Garland	1911	8/2/2023
Murphy-Jeffries Building		2901-2903 South Martin Luther King Blvd.	Little Rock	Pulaski	c.1925	4/3/2019
North Arkansas Wood Products Kiln		Highway 65	St. Joe	Searcy	1943	3/4/1998
Oaks Cemetery		1121 South Dunn Avenue	Fayetteville	Washington	c.1867-1963	12/3/2014
Oark General Store		East of Highway 215	Oark	Johnson	1890	3/3/1995
Old Kia Kima		26 Kolo Drive	Cherokee Village	Sharp	1916	4/1/2015
Palace Theatre		224 West South Street	Benton	Saline	1919	8/6/2014
Pea Ridge School Complex Historic District		1507 N. Curtis St.	Pea Ridge	Benton	1929, 1948	4/7/2004
Peeler Gap Road House		S. of Co. Rd. 15 SE of Hwy. 10	Danville	Yell	c. 1835	3/3/1995
Petit Jean Mountain Cemetery		Northeast of the Trinity Lane and Montgomery Trace Intersection	Winrock vic.	Conway	c.1854-1870	4/4/2018
Pleasant Grove Cemetery		Little Pond Road and Pleasant Grove Loop intersection	Scotland	VanBuren	1871-1960	4/5/2023
Plumerville High School Gymnasium		Bulldog Drive	Plumerville	Conway	1939	12/3/2003
Portland Bank Portico		217 E. Main St.	Portland	Ashley	1926	6/2/1995
Pratt Place-Markham Camp		Markham Road	Fayetteville	Washington	1921-1941	4/7/1999
Primrose Cemetery		3006 West Dixon Road	Little Rock	Pulaski	1848	12/2/2020
Promise Land Baptist Church		Road 30, approximately 0.75 miles southeast of Road 204	Doddridge vic.	Miller	c.1880	12/1/2010
Providence Missionary Baptist Church		20 Almyra Lane	Immanuel	Arkansas	c.1918	12/7/2005
R.L. Wilson Confectionary		330 S. Main St.	Jonesboro	Craighead	c. 1900	11/6/2002
Ragsdale House		990-1000 Midway Road	Shuler vic.	Union	1898	3/5/1997
Railroad Trestle #78-7		Approximately 1/4 mile Northwest of 542 CR 2073	Eureka Springs vic.	Carroll	1949-1950	8/3/2011
Redbug Field		Atkinson Street	Fordyce	Dallas	1927	8/6/2014
Rev. Lee James House		111 Pinehurst	Texarkana	Miller	c. 1899	12/2/1998
Richwoods Church		Lawrence County Rds. 400 and 407	Walnut Ridge vic.	Lawrence	ca. 1913	4/5/2000
Rison House and Cemetery		NW corner of E and River Sts.	Perryville	Perry	1844	12/4/1996
Round Top Mountain Crash Site		Arkansas Highway 7 on the east side of Round Top Mountain	Jasper vic.	Newton	1948	4/7/2010
Roy Reed House		10810 Hogeye Road	Hogeye	Washington	1979-1980	4/5/2006
Sadler House		505 North 14th Street	Van Buren	Crawford	1908	4/3/2013
Samuel Porter Bird House		4881 Highway 9	Birdtown	Conway	1923	8/5/2009
Scheid House		1805 West 18th Street	North Little Rock	Pulaski	c.1914-1917	12/3/2014
Scotland School		Highway 95	Scotland	VanBuren	1926	12/6/2000
Seminary Cemetery		South of the intersection of Ouachita County roads 104, 112, and 114	Stephens vic.	Ouachita	c.1850-1939	8/3/2016
Shumaker Naval Ammunition Depot Laundry Building		Northwest Corner of Spellman Road and County Road 401	East Camden	Calhoun	c.1950	4/4/2018
Slabtown Grocery		Highway 167	Sheridan vic.	Grant	c. 1940	4/7/1999
Snowball Gymnasium		County Road 12, 0.1 miles west of Harvest Lane	Snowball	Searcy	1956	8/7/2019
South Howard Street Historic District		203, 205, 207, 209, & 211	Morrilton	Conway	c.1945	8/5/2015
South Side Bee Branch School Historic District		334 Southside Road	Bee Branch	VanBuren	1936-1972	12/7/2022
Southwestern Proving Ground Telephone Exchange Building		136 Hempstead 278	Hope vic.	Hempstead	1941	8/3/2016
Springfield to Fayetteville Road, Brightwater Segment		N. Old Wire Road/Benton County Road 67, south of US 62	Brightwater vic.	Benton	1837-1839, 1854, 1862	8/5/2009
St. Boniface Catholic Church		Off Highway 69	New Dixie	Perry	1906	6/5/1996
St. John Missionary Baptist Church		709 Morning Star St.	Arkansas City	Desha	1930	12/3/2003
St. Paul Methodist Church and Cemetery		495 St. Paul Cemetery Road	Dover vic.	Pope	1894-1960	4/7/2010
St. Peter's Catholic Church		207 E. 16th	Pine Bluff	Jefferson	1903	3/6/2002
Superior Federal Savings and Loan		1601 Rogers Avenue	Fort Smith	Sebastian	1963	4/5/2017
Texas, Oklahoma & Eastern Railroad Steam Locomotive #360		AR 88 at Queen Wilhelmina State Park	Mena vic.	Polk	1920	4/6/2022
The Traveler		Rison	Rison Vic.	Cleveland	1905-1960	11/4/2004
Thornsberry Church		NW of County Roads 66 and 88	Tontitown vic.	Washington	1894	3/6/1996
Tulip School		4566 Highway 9	Tulip	Dallas	1902	9/6/2000
U.S. Post Office		108 E. Huntington	Jonesboro	Craighead	c. 1900	11/6/2002
Union African Methodist Episcopal Church		1491 Old Camden Road	Mt. Holly	Union	1950	8/7/2019
Van Buren to Vineyard Road, Rodeo Crossing Road Segment		Rodeo Crossing Road west of junction with Highway 59	Natural Dam vic.	Crawford	1838-1839	4/7/2010
W. D. and Kate McGaugh House		105 N. Rust	Gentry	Benton	c.1902	4/6/2016
W.F. Branch High School		Clay Street	Newport	Jackson	1950s	12/2/2020
W.S. Blackshare House		2691 Highway 141	Boydsville	Clay	1881-1883	12/3/1997
WPA Privy		9539 White Drive	Cord	Independence	c.1936	4/6/2018
Wallace-Menard-Coose Cemetery		529 Nady Road	Nady	Arkansas	1876-1956	8/2/2006
Walls House		AR 31	Tomberlin	Lonoke	1907	9/6/1995
War Memorial Stadium		Markham and Van Buren	Little Rock	Pulaski	1947	9/28/1998
Watson Jail		Main Street southwest of the Main Street and AR 1 Intersection	Watson	Desha	c.1930	12/3/2008
Waverly Plantation		junction County Roads 215 and 7	Waverly	Crittenden	1913	12/6/1995
William F. "Casey" Laman House		324 Dooley Road	North Little Rock	Pulaski	1947	4/7/1999
Wilson Cemetery		County Road 828	Trumann vic.	Craighead	c. 1900	9/4/1996
Wilson House		Southwest corner of North A and West Spring streets	Centerton	Benton	1905	4/5/2023
Wilson-Hartsfield House		2061 Columbia Road 38	Magnolia vic.	Columbia	c.1865	8/3/2016
Winthrop School		530 Spring Street	Winthrop	Little River	1913	11/7/2001
Wylds Cabin		East Arkansas Community College campus	Forrest City	St.Francis	1843	9/3/1997
YWCA Building		118 West Peach Street	El Dorado	Union	1938	8/2/2017
Yale Camp Historic District		1141 South Parkway Drive	Crossett	Ashley	1946	8/3/2022
Zero Milestone		623 Woodlane	Little Rock	Pulaski	1932	12/2/2020

== See also ==
- National Historic Sites (United States)
- National Register of Historic Places listings in Arkansas, with links to list articles by county
