= Bayou Meto Battlefield =

Battlefield in Arkansas, United States

- U.S. National Register of Historic Places
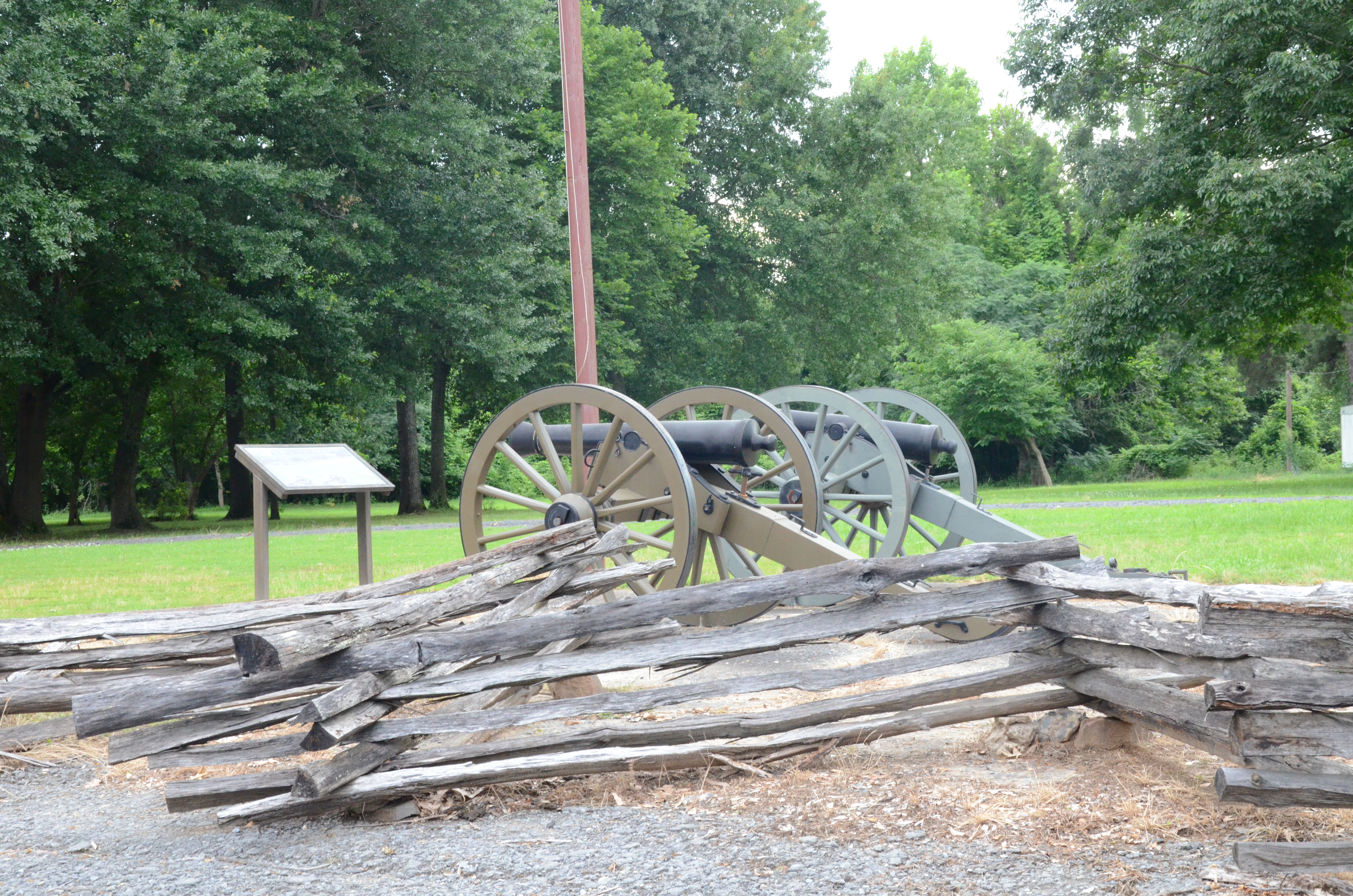
- Reed's Bridge Battlefield Heritage Park

- Location within Arkansas
- Location: Jacksonville, Arkansas
- Coordinates: 34°50′33.0″N 92°07′12.0″W
- Area: 412 acres (167 ha)
- MPS: Little Rock Campaign of 1863
- NRHP reference No.: 02001627
- Added to NRHP: December 31, 2002

The Bayou Meto Battlefield, also known as Reed's Bridge Battlefield Heritage Park, is an American Civil War battlefield in Jacksonville, Arkansas. It is the location of the August 27, 1863, Battle of Bayou Meto, in which Confederate forces successfully prevented Union forces from crossing the Bayou Meto River during their advance to capture Little Rock.

== Description and administrative history ==
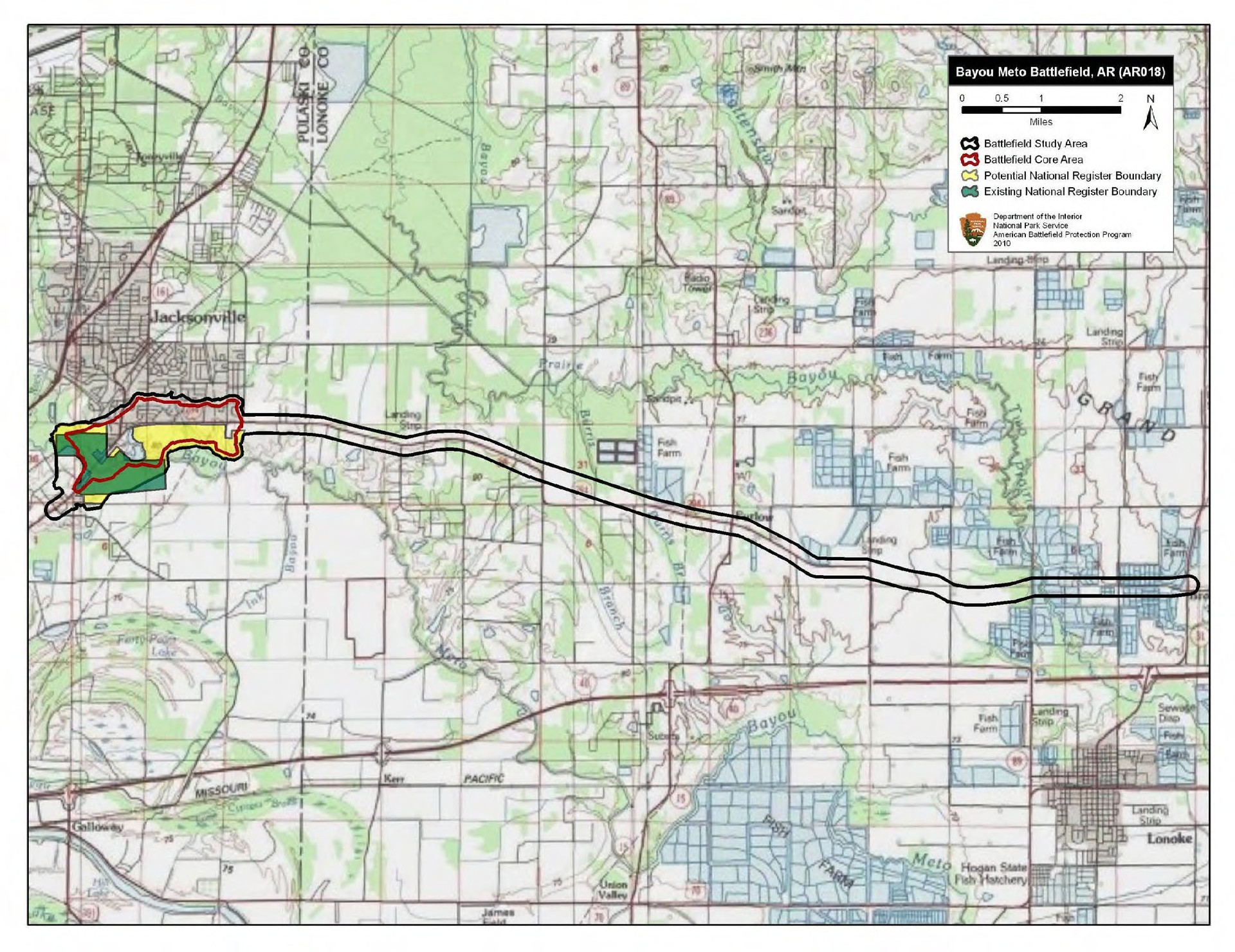
Map of battlefield core and study areas

The battlefield is located on both sides of the river, on either side of Arkansas Highway 161, whose bridge is the location of the 1863 Reed's Bridge. A portion of the battlefield is preserved as Reed's Bridge Battlefield Heritage Park. The entire battlefield is the best-preserved of the three major battle sites of the Union advance on Little Rock. A 412-acre (167 ha) area covering the core of the battlefield was listed on the National Register of Historic Places in 2002.

== See also ==
- Bayou Fourche Battlefield
- National Register of Historic Places listings in Pulaski County, Arkansas
