= Bayou Fourche Battlefield =

Battlefield in Arkansas, United States

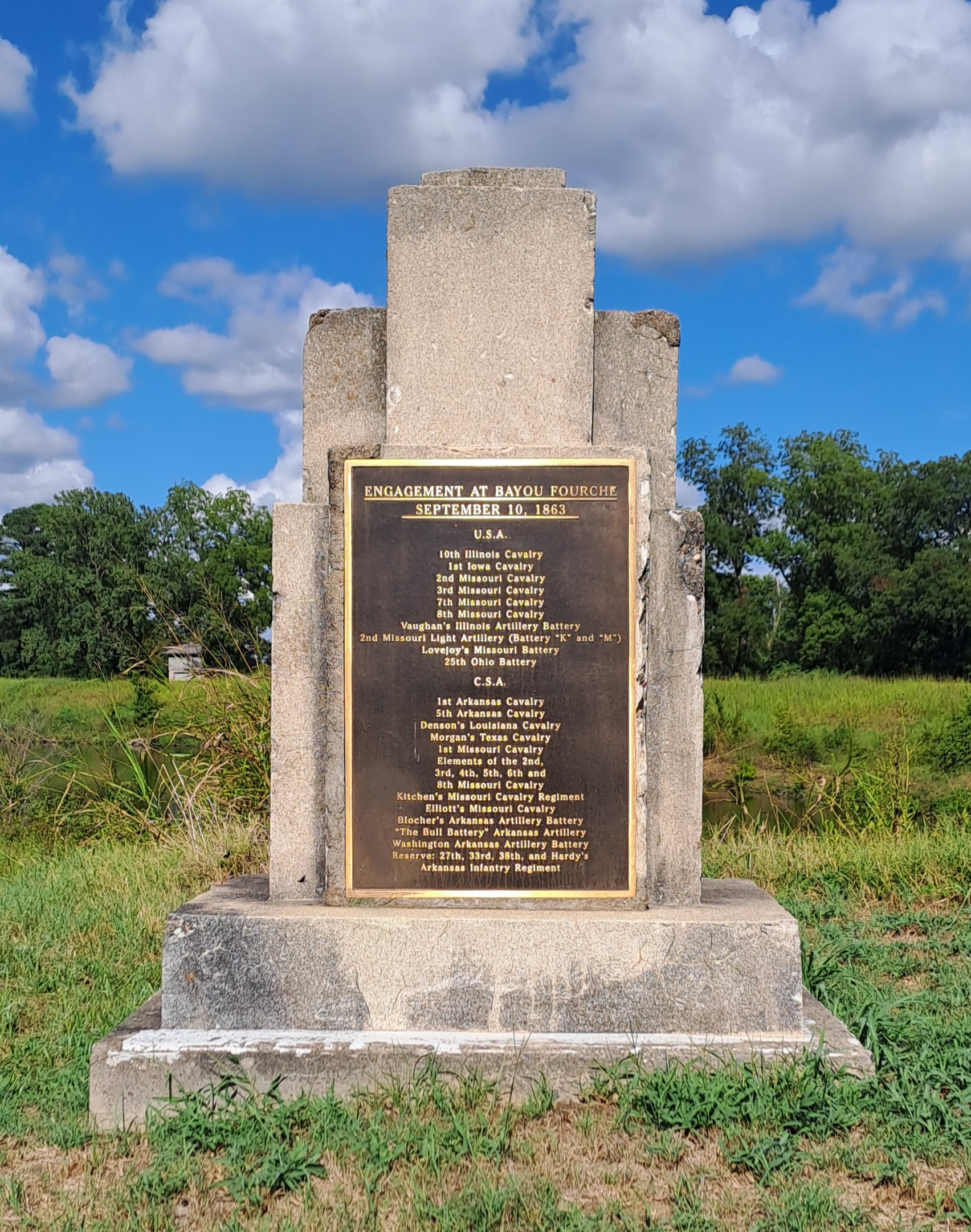
- Battle of Bayou Fourche Monument, 2024

- Location in Arkansas
- 34°43′19.1″N 92°12′05.4″W
- Location: East of Willow Beach Lake to east of Clinton National Airport, Little Rock and North Little Rock, Arkansas

The Bayou Fourche Battlefield, also known as the Fourche Bayou Battlefield, is an American Civil War battlefield in Little Rock and North Little Rock, Arkansas. A city park located within its boundaries, and maintained by Little Rock Parks and Recreation, commemorates the Battle of Bayou Fourche fought on September 10, 1863.

The Union victory over Confederate forces in central Arkansas resulted in a fourth Confederate state capital falling into Union hands and creating conditions to establish a loyal Unionist government. The Confederate army fell back into southwest Arkansas, where it effectively remained for the duration of the Civil War. The capture of Little Rock, combined with other Union victories at Fort Smith and in the Indian Territory, led to nominal Federal control of the Arkansas River valley for the rest of the war.

== Description and administrative history ==
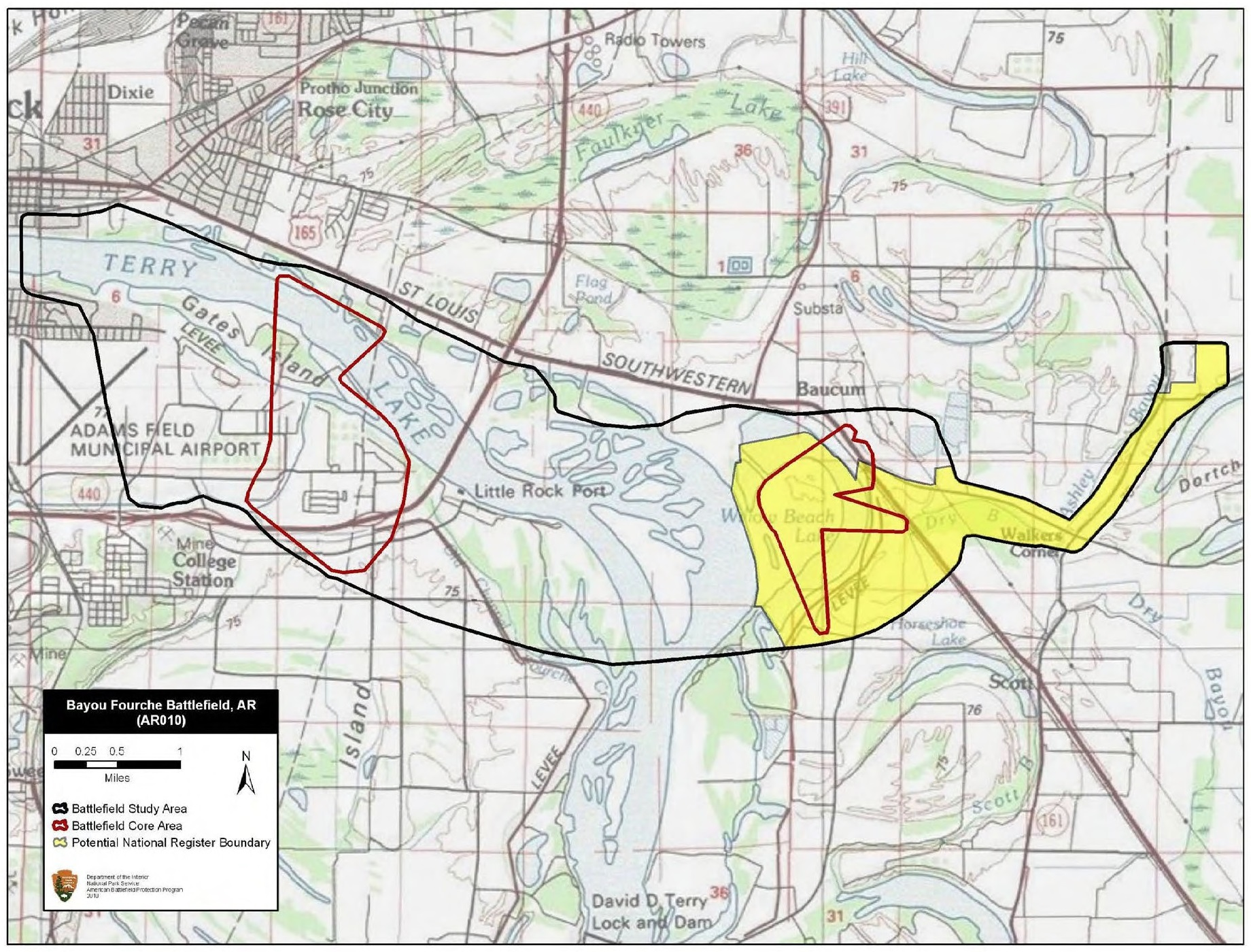
Map of battlefield core and study areas

The Bayou Fourche Battlefield lies within the borders of Little Rock and North Little Rock, Arkansas, running east of Willow Beach Lake to the east of Clinton National Airport. Remaining portions of the battlefield are threatened by development. The eastern engagement area where the Federal cavalry crossed the Arkansas River is being converted for lakeside residential uses. While much of the landscape has been compromised by growth around Little Rock, the eastern portion retains its integrity. The battlefield was listed in the Arkansas Register of Historic Places on April 7, 2010.

== See also ==
- Bayou Meto Battlefield
- Jenkins' Ferry Battleground State Park
