= Little Rock (disambiguation) =

Little Rock is the capital of the U.S. state of Arkansas.

Little Rock or Littlerock may also refer to:

== Places ==
- Little Rock, Arkansas
  - Little Rock Union Station, a railway station
- Littlerock, California
- Little Rock, Illinois
- Little Rock, Indiana
- Little Rock, Iowa
- Little Rock, Beltrami County, Minnesota, a census-designated place
- Little Rock, Morrison County, Minnesota. an unincorporated community
- Little Rock, Oklahoma
- Little Rock, Mississippi
- Little Rock, South Carolina
- Littlerock, Washington
- Little Rock Air Force Base, in Jacksonville, Arkansas
- Little Rock Creek (disambiguation)
- Little Rock Dam
- Little Rock Township, Kendall County, Illinois
- Little Rock Township, Nobles County, Minnesota

== People ==
- Little Rock (Cheyenne chief)

== Music ==
- "Little Rock" (Reba McEntire song), 1986
- "Little Rock" (Collin Raye song), 1994
- Little Rock (album), Hayes Carll album), 2005

== Other uses ==
- Littlerock (film), a 2010 film
- Little Rock (poem), composition by Cuban writer Nicolás Guillén
- Little Rock Crisis, a forced school desegregation during the American Civil Rights Movement
- USS Little Rock, several ships of the United States Navy
- Little Rock Trojans, the athletic program of the University of Arkansas at Little Rock
