= J. Knox Walker =

Confederate States Army officer (1818–1863)

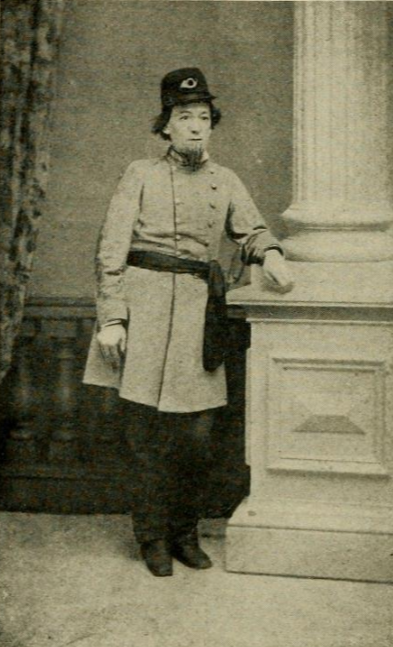
- Walker in uniform, c. 1862

Member of the Tennessee Senate from Fayettey and Shelby counties
- In office October 5, 1857 – October 3, 1859
- Preceded by: Charles S. Palmer
- Succeeded by: Constituency abolished

Secretary to the President of the United States
- In office March 4, 1845 – March 4, 1849
- President: James K. Polk
- Preceded by: Robert Tyler
- Succeeded by: William W. S. Bliss

Personal details
- Born: Joseph Knox Walker; July 19, 1818 Columbia, Tennessee, U.S.
- Died: August 21, 1863 (aged 45) Memphis, Tennessee, C.S.
- Relatives: Lucius M. Walker (brother); James K. Polk (uncle)

Military service
- Allegiance: Confederate States
- Branch: Confederate States Army
- Years of service: 1861–1863
- Rank: Colonel
- Commands: 2nd Tennessee Infantry Regiment
- Battles: American Civil War; Battle of Shiloh; Siege of Corinth

Joseph Knox Walker (July 19, 1818 – August 21, 1863) was an American politician who served as a senior officer of the Confederate States Army who commanded infantry in the Western Theater of the American Civil War.

== Early life and career ==
Walker was born on July 19, 1818, in Columbia, Tennessee. He was the son of James Walker, of Columbia, Tennessee, a nephew of President James K. Polk, and a brother of Lucius M. Walker. He graduated from Yale College in 1838.

In March 1845, he became Private Secretary to President Polk and the signer of land-warrants. He was a member of the Tennessee Senate's 32nd General Assembly as a member of the Democratic Party.

Soon after the beginning of the American Civil War, he entered the Confederate States Army and became colonel of the 2nd Tennessee Infantry Regiment. Exposure in camp at Columbus, Kentucky, and afterward in the vicinity of the Battle of Shiloh and Siege of Corinth, impaired his health so seriously that he resigned his command. The United States Army general commanding the department permitted him to return home to Memphis, Tennessee. There, his strength gradually declined until he died.

== Personal life and death ==
Walker was married to Augusta Adams Tabb and had four children. He died at the residence of his brother-in-law, Mr. Wm. S. Pickett, on August 21, 1863 (aged 45).

== Notes ==
This article incorporates public domain material from the Yale Obituary Record.
