= Army of Arkansas =

- Active: 1863–1865
- Country: United States (Union)
- Branch: United States Army
- Type: Field army
- Engagements: American Civil War

Commanders
- Notable commanders: Frederick Steele; Joseph J. Reynolds

The Army of Arkansas was a Union Army that served in the Trans-Mississippi Theater during the American Civil War. This force functioned exclusively in the state of Arkansas.

== History ==
The Army of Arkansas was created on July 27, 1863, with Major General Frederick Steele in command. The army was created in the wake of the Union victories at Vicksburg and Helena, both of which occurred on July 4, 1863, resulting in the complete consolidation of federal control of the Mississippi River and the opportunity to seize Little Rock and begin pacification efforts to return Arkansas to the Union. It was composed of troops in Union-occupied areas of the state of Arkansas. General Steele led the army in its two most significant campaigns: The Little Rock Expedition and Camden Expedition. At Little Rock the army consisted of three divisions under John W. Davidson, Adolph Englemann and Samuel A. Rice.

During the Camden Expedition the army consisted of one corps – the VII Corps – and the two were virtually synonymous. It was composed of the divisions of Frederick Salomon, John M. Thayer and Eugene A. Carr.

Steele was replaced as commander of the army on December 22, 1864, by Major General Joseph J. Reynolds. Reynolds commanded the army during Price's Missouri Raid but his troops actively involved in the Union pursuit. Reynolds remained in command until the war's end.

== Commanders ==
- Major General Frederick Steele (July 27, 1863 – December 22, 1864)
- Major General Joseph J. Reynolds (December 22, 1864 – August 1, 1865)

== Major Battles ==
- Battle of Bayou Fourche (Steele)
- Camden Expedition (Steele)
