= Little Rock Creek (Mississippi River tributary) =

Stream in Benton and Morrison County, Minnesota, U.S.

Coordinates: 45°45′6″N 94°10′41″W

Little Rock Creek is a stream in Benton and Morrison counties, Minnesota, in the United States. It is a tributary of the Mississippi River.

Little Rock Creek was named for a rock outcropping near its mouth.

== See also ==
- List of rivers of Minnesota
