= Little Rock Creek (Minnesota River tributary) =

Stream in Minnesota, U.S.

Coordinates: 44°23′6″N 94°37′11″W

Little Rock Creek is a stream in the U.S. state of Minnesota. It is a tributary of Minnesota River.

Little Rock Creek took its name from an old Native American trading post called Little Rock, or Petite Roche in French.

== See also ==
- List of rivers of Minnesota
