= Brownsville, Arkansas =

Brownsville
- Unincorporated community
- Location within Arkansas Location within the United States
- Coordinates: 34°49′10″N 91°52′46″W
- Country: United States
- State: Arkansas
- County: Lonoke
- Elevation: 246 ft (75 m)
- Time zone: UTC-6 (Central (CST))
  - Summer (DST): UTC-5 (CDT)
- Area code: 501
- GNIS feature ID: 59092

Brownsville is an unincorporated community in Lonoke County, Arkansas, United States. The community is on Arkansas Highway 31 2.7 miles (4.3 km) north-northeast of Lonoke.

Brownsville was established in 1846 in what was at the time part of Prairie County, and it served as the first county seat. The community was named for U.S. Army officer Jacob Brown, who was killed in the Siege of Fort Texas the same year. By 1860, the town's population had grown to 2,000 residents, and it had a courthouse, a hotel, a newspaper, and several churches and businesses. During the American Civil War, a battle and multiple smaller skirmishes were fought at Brownsville, and soldiers from both sides plundered resources from the town. After the war, the Memphis and Little Rock Railroad bypassed the town to the south, and Prairie County moved its seat to DeValls Bluff in 1868. When Lonoke County formed in 1873, it chose Lonoke over Brownsville as its county seat, ending the town's early prominence.
