= Little Rock Creek (Red Lake) =

Stream in Beltrami County, Minnesota, U.S.

Coordinates: 47°52′31″N 95°6′31″W

Little Rock Creek is a stream in Beltrami County, Minnesota, in the United States. It flows into Red Lake.

Little Rock Creek was named from the many small boulders near its mouth.

== See also ==
- List of rivers of Minnesota
