= Bill Clinton Boyhood Home =

Historic house in Arkansas, United States

- U.S. National Register of Historic Places
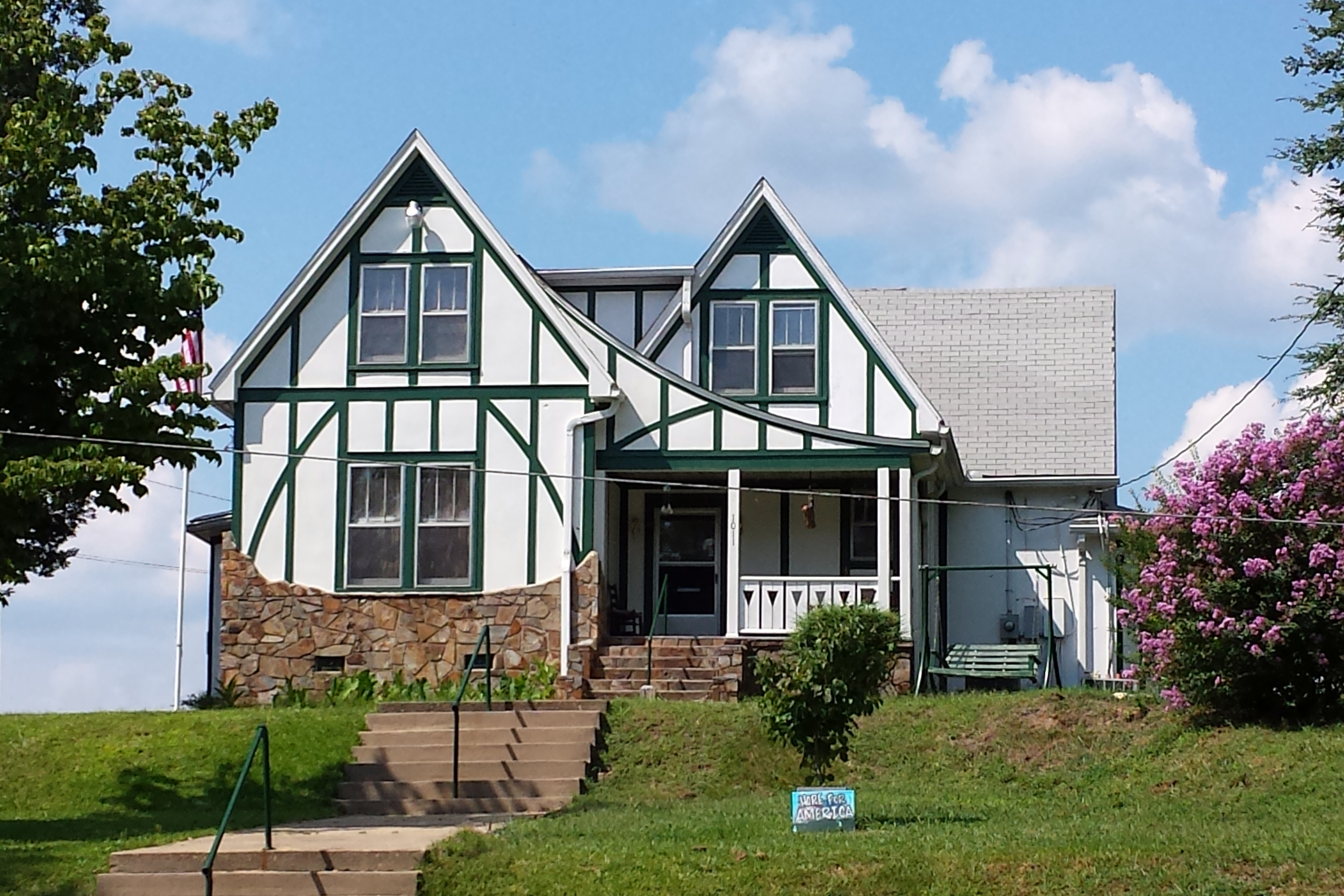

- Location within Arkansas Location within the United States
- Location: 1011 Park Ave., Hot Springs, Arkansas
- Coordinates: 34°31′53″N 93°2′45″W
- Area: less than one acre
- Built: 1896; 1938
- Architectural style: Tudor Revival
- NRHP reference No.: 95000655
- Added to NRHP: May 18, 1995

The Bill Clinton Boyhood Home, also known as the Birnbaum-Shubetz House, is a historic house at 1011 Park Avenue in Hot Springs, Arkansas. Built about 1896 and redesigned in the Tudor Revival in 1938, it was the home of United States President Bill Clinton between 1954 and 1961, teenage years in which he first determined to enter politics. In addition to this national historic significance, it is locally notable as an example of Tudor Revival architecture. The house is a private residence and is not open to the public.

The house was listed on the National Register of Historic Places in 1995.

== See also ==
- National Register of Historic Places listings in Garland County, Arkansas
