= Skirmish at Ashley's Mills =

1863 battle of the American Civil War

Skirmish at Ashely's Mill
- Part of the American Civil War
Date	September 7, 1863
Location	Pulaski County (present-day Scott), Arkansas 34°42′06.2″N 92°05′45.3″W
Result	Union victory

Belligerents
United States (Union)	Confederate States

Commanders and leaders
(United States) John W. Davidson	(Confederate States of America) Robert C. Newton

Units involved
7th Missouri Cavalry	5th Arkansas Cavalry

Casualties and losses
None reported	1 Killed, 3 Wounded, 2 Captured
- Location in Arkansas

The Skirmish at Ashley's Mill, also known as the Skirmish at Ferry Landing, was a battle of the American Civil War fought between Union and Confederate forces on September 7, 1863, in Pulaski County (present-day Scott), Arkansas.

== Battle ==
Union Brigadier-General John W. Davidson commanding the cavalry division of the Union Army of Arkansas sent the 7th Missouri Volunteer Cavalry Regiment as his lead regiment to clear the 5th Arkansas Cavalry Regiment, under the temporary command of Major John Bull while Colonel Robert C. Newton was in temporary brigade command, from its position guarding a crossing of the Arkansas River near Little Rock, Arkansas. The Union cavalry forced the Confederates to retreat which opened the route to the east of the river, leading to the Battle of Bayou Fourche on September 10, 1863, and the capture of Little Rock by the Union Army of Arkansas under the command of Major-General Frederick Steele. The Confederate regiment's casualties were 1 killed, 3 wounded and 2 captured while the Union regiment reported no casualties.

== See also ==
- List of American Civil War battles
- Troop engagements of the American Civil War, 1863
