= Lucius M. Walker =

Confederate States Army officer (1829–1863)

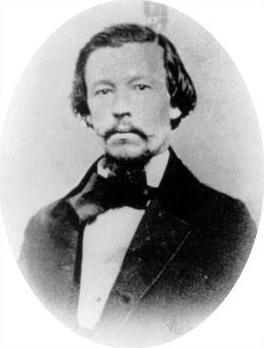
- Born: October 18, 1829; Columbia, Tennessee, U.S.
- Died: September 7, 1863 (aged 33); Little Rock, Arkansas, C.S.
- Relatives: J. Knox Walker (brother); James K. Polk (uncle)
- Military career
- Allegiance: United States; Confederate States
- Branch: United States Army; Confederate States Army
- Service years: 1850–1852 (U.S.); 1861–1863 (C.S.)
- Rank: Second Lieutenant (U.S.); Brigadier General (C.S.)
- Nickname: "Marsh"
- Conflicts: American Civil War; Battle of Island Number Ten; Siege of Corinth; Battle of Helena; Battle of Reed's Bridge

Lucius Marshall Walker (October 18, 1829 – September 7, 1863) was an American soldier who served as a Confederate general during the American Civil War. He was mortally wounded in a duel with fellow general John S. Marmaduke.

== Early life and education ==
Lucius Marshall Walker was born in Columbia, Tennessee. He was a nephew of President James K. Polk. Walker finished his school year in the United States Military Academy in 1850, placing 15th of a class of 44. He was brevetted Second Lieutenant of dragoons and served on frontier duty in Texas. He was commissioned a second lieutenant in 1852, shortly before resigning to return to Tennessee, where he established a successful mercantile business.

Walker lived in St. Francis County, Arkansas, at the time of his enlistment.

== American Civil War ==
With the outbreak of the Civil War, Walker was commissioned colonel of the 40th Tennessee Volunteer Infantry on November 11, 1861. His first assignment was to command the post at Memphis, Tennessee. In 1862, Walker and the 40th Tennessee were ordered to New Madrid, Missouri, to prepare for the Battle of Island Number Ten.

Walker was commissioned brigadier general on March 11, 1862, and was posted at Kentucky Bend, with the command of the 40th Tennessee falling to Lieutenant Colonel C. C. Henderson. He retreated in the face of a much larger United States Army, threatening to capture all of Walker's command. Being forced to surrender at Island Number 10, Walker was exchanged and rejoined the army at Corinth, Mississippi, before it retreated to Tupelo. On May 9, 1862, at the Battle of Farmington, his brigade attacked and drove a U.S. force from its entrenchments. He was reassigned to the Trans-Mississippi Department on March 23, 1863, commanding a brigade of cavalry under Lieutenant General Theophilus Holmes at the Battle of Helena.

== Duel with Marmaduke and death ==
After the Battle of Reed's Bridge on August 26, 1863, Brig. Gen. John S. Marmaduke accused Walker of imperiling Marmaduke's men by being absent from the field in the face of the enemy. Judging from the indications that the enemy was about to flank his position, Walker had withdrawn his troops after dark. Walker felt unjustly accused of cowardice and challenged Marmaduke to a formal duel. "I have not pronounced you a coward," Marmaduke wrote, "but I desire to inform you that your conduct as commander of the cavalry was such that I determined no longer to serve you." Major General Sterling Price ordered both officers to remain in their quarters in an attempt to prevent the duel. However, the orders were not delivered to Walker because of a series of mishaps.

At dawn on Sunday, September 6, Walker and Marmaduke squared off with Colt 1851 Navy Revolvers on the north bank of the Arkansas River near Little Rock. Both fired and missed. Marmaduke then recocked and fired again, mortally wounding Walker in the right side, just above the beltline. Walker forgave Marmaduke when the latter offered his assistance. As Walker lay dying, his wife rode from St. Francis to Little Rock, giving birth to their son, Lucius Marshall Walker Jr.

Walker died at 5 p.m. the next day. He was buried in Elmwood Cemetery in Memphis.

Frank Crawford Armstrong married Maria Polk Walker, daughter of Lucius's brother Joseph Knox Walker. Joseph Walker died on August 21, 1863.

== See also ==
- List of American Civil War generals (Confederate)
