= Battle of Helena =

1863 battle of the American Civil War

- Part of the American Civil War
Date	July 4, 1863 (163 years ago)
Location	Phillips County, Arkansas 34°31′34″N 90°35′49″W
Result	Union victory

Belligerents
United States (Union)	Confederate States

Commanders and leaders
(United States) Benjamin Prentiss: Frederick Salomon	(Confederate States of America) Theophilus Holmes: Sterling Price

Units involved
Thirteenth Division, XIII Corps; (United States Navy) USS Tyler	District of Arkansas

Strength
4,129	7,646

Casualties and losses
220 or 239	1,636
- Location within Arkansas

The Battle of Helena was fought on July 4, 1863, near Helena, Arkansas, during the American Civil War. Union troops captured the city in July 1862, and had been using it as a base of operations. Over 7,500 Confederate troops led by Lieutenant General Theophilus Holmes attempted to capture Helena in hopes of relieving some of the pressure on the Confederate army besieged in Vicksburg, Mississippi. Helena was defended by about 4,100 Union troops led by Major General Benjamin Prentiss, manning one fort and four batteries of artillery.

Differing interpretations of Holmes' order to attack at daylight resulted in Brigadier General James F. Fagan's troops attacking Battery D unsupported, and Major General Sterling Price's attack against the Union center was made after Fagan's had largely fizzled out. To the north, Confederate cavalry commanded by Brigadier Generals John S. Marmaduke and Lucius M. Walker failed to act in concert and accomplished little. The assaults failed, and Vicksburg fell the same day. Later in the year, Union troops used Helena as a staging ground for their successful campaign to capture Little Rock, Arkansas.

== Background ==
In December 1860, the state of South Carolina seceded from the United States, as a result of several disagreements with the federal government, slavery chief among them. Further Deep South states seceded early in the next year, forming the Confederate States of America. The Civil War began on April 12, when Confederate troops bombarded Fort Sumter. When Abraham Lincoln, the newly elected President of the United States, called for 75,000 volunteers to put down the rebellion, this proved the catalyst for the southern state of Arkansas to secede and join the Confederacy. Fighting occurred to the north in Missouri during 1861, but in early March 1862, Confederate forces were defeated in northern Arkansas at the Battle of Pea Ridge. Beginning in late April, Union (United States) forces followed up on the victory at Pea Ridge by moving into Arkansas, threatening the state capital of Little Rock, and occupying the Mississippi River town of Helena on July 12.

By early 1863, holding Helena provided the Union with significant advantages, such as serving as a supply depot for the ongoing Vicksburg campaign, providing a marshalling point for a future advance against Little Rock, and securing northeastern Arkansas. In late May, with Union troops heavily pressuring Vicksburg, Confederate authorities sent a message to General Joseph E. Johnston suggesting that forces from the Trans-Mississippi Department be used to relieve the pressure on Vicksburg. One idea was an attack on Helena. The commander of Confederate forces in the Trans-Mississippi, Lieutenant General Edmund Kirby Smith, was forwarded in June the dispatch that Johnston had received, and delegated making the decision whether to attack Helena to Lieutenant General Theophilus Holmes, the Confederate commander of the District of Arkansas.

== Prelude ==
On June 9, Holmes learned that the strength of the Union forces in Helena was about 3,000 or 4,000 men, and decided against an attack. He thought the attack would be too costly, and instead suggested placing an artillery battery along the Mississippi River to intercept Union shipping. Further vacillation by Holmes ended when Confederate cavalry reported on June 14 that the garrison at Helena had been weakened. He began moving towards Jacksonport and met Major General Sterling Price and Brigadier General John S. Marmaduke on June 18. There they formed a plan to concentrate Confederate forces against Helena, although Holmes was still nervous about the proposed attack, as he was worried that it might fail. He made an agreement with Price, who was much more popular with the general public, that he would publicly support the decision of the attack in the case of a failure.

Once formed, the plan called for Price, with his 3,095 infantry, to move from Jacksonport to Cotton Plant on June 22, along with Marmaduke's 1,750 cavalry; that 1,339 infantry commanded by Brigadier General James F. Fagan would move from Little Rock to Clarendon, and that Brigadier General Lucius M. Walker would screen Helena with his 1,462 cavalry. Holmes would accompany the attack. On June 22, Holmes revised the plan, ordering Price to concentrate at a location known as Switzer's, instead of Cotton Plant. Rains and high stream levels slowed Price's approach, and though Marmaduke's men reached Switzer's on time, the infantry was delayed at the crossing of the Cache River. Moving through swamps resulted in the loss of many accompanying animals and wagons. Holmes and Fagan reached Clarendon on June 26. Once there, Holmes provided further orders for the advance: Walker was to screen Fagan's movement to Helena with part of his command, while Price continued on to Helena from Switzer's. Price's advance continued to be slowed by the terrain and weather, to the annoyance of Holmes, who rightly believed that the delay had prevented any remaining chance of the movement being a surprise. The Confederate columns finally united on July 3, and that day began the final movement towards Helena. Overall, the Confederates had 7,646 men.

The Union troops in Helena were commanded by Major General Benjamin Prentiss and consisted of the Thirteenth Division of the Thirteenth Corps. Although Prentiss was in command of the general district around Helena, the garrison itself was operationally commanded by Brigadier General Frederick Salomon, the commander of the division. Salomon would make many of the decisions in the upcoming battle. Prentiss originally dismissed rumors of a Confederate attack, but by late June gave more credence to the reports. A defensive position known as Fort Curtis already existed to the west of Helena, but four new batteries, named with the letters A, B, C, and D, were ordered built. Each of the four batteries was located on a high point of Crowley's Ridge. Trees were felled in front of the Union lines, although it is unclear if they were simply left where they fell as an obstruction or were converted into abatis. Prentiss was originally intended to be reinforced by three vessels from the Union Navy, but only one, the timberclad USS Tyler, (Note: At this stage of her career, Tyler was armed with six eight-inch guns, three 30-pounder rifled cannon, and one 12-pounder smoothbore cannon.) was available when the Confederate attack struck. Prentiss also cancelled a planned celebration of the Fourth of July as a precaution, and ordered the roads into town barricaded with felled trees. The Union garrison would face the coming attack with 4,129 men. Remembering the surprise suffered by men under his command in the earlier Battle of Shiloh, Prentiss ordered reveille blown daily at 2 am. Prentiss' men had advantages over the Confederates through their defenses, batteries, and naval support. The Confederates had support from the local white populace.

== Battle ==
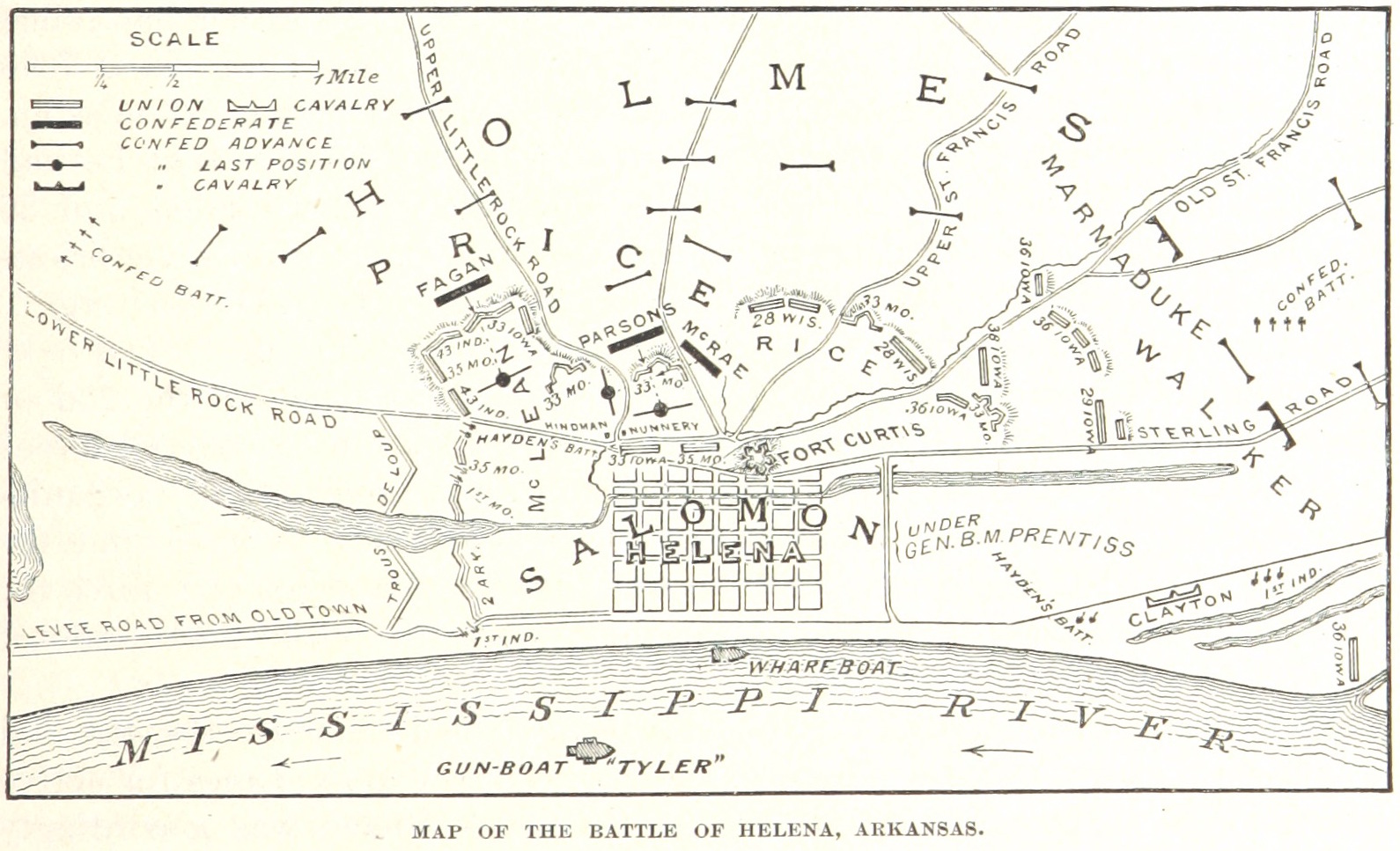
1887 map of the Battle of Helena

On July 3, Holmes, Price, Walker, Fagan, and Marmaduke gathered to formulate the plan of assault. Holmes noted that the defenses of Helena were stronger than he expected but carried on with the attack anyway. Price was to attack the Union center, focusing on Battery C on Graveyard Hill. South of Price, Fagan was to attack Battery D on Hindman's Hill, while Marmaduke, supported by Walker, was to attack from the north, take Rightor's Hill, and then use the hill as an artillery position to fire on Batteries A and B. Walker's specific orders were to "act against the enemy as circumstances may justify", a vague order that left him under his own initiative and resulted in him accomplishing little in the coming battle. Holmes made a pledge that he would take personal responsibility for the results of the assault if it failed. The converging attack would be difficult, and the generals interpreted Holmes' order to begin the attack at "daylight" differently. Historian Robert Kerby describes the Confederate plan as "a model of brutal irresponsibility". Since Prentiss was aware of a coming attack, the Confederates would not have the advantage of surprise. Their plans were also hampered by poor reconnaissance.

Late on July 3, Fagan sent a patrol commanded by Colonel William H. Brooks to secure the junction of the two roads leading to Little Rock. To protect Fagan's flank, Brooks' men were sent up the Lower Little Rock Road at around 1:30 am; the detachment opened the battle in the early dawn by clashing with Union pickets. Brooks' Confederates also encountered a camp of African-American refugees. Some of the refugees were killed, some were taken prisoner, and the camp was burned by the Confederates at some point during the battle. The felled trees slowed Fagan's main attack, which was on the Upper Little Rock Road, and forced the Confederates to leave their supply wagons and cannons behind. Either at 3:30 am or shortly after 4:00 am, Fort Curtis fired a warning shot, alerting the Union defenders to the Confederate approach. At 4:05 am, Fagan's skirmishers sighted the Union position, and with the day dawning, Fagan attacked with three infantry regiments. Fagan's charge took the first line of Union defenses, but his men started taking fire from Batteries C and D. Minutes after Fagan's men became engaged, Marmaduke's men on the north end of the Confederate line entered the action, driving Union skirmishers back towards Battery A. The Confederates came under fire from the 29th Iowa Infantry Regiment, which had been sent to reinforce the position at Rightor's Hill, and became disorganized. Marmaduke paused his men, who were fighting dismounted, to wait for artillery to be brought up and for Walker's men to arrive in support. Meanwhile, on the Lower Little Rock Road, Brooks ran into trouble, taking fire from Battery K, 1st Missouri Light Artillery Regiment and Tyler. The fire from the artillery battery did little damage, but the gunboat's shots were more effective. Brooks' men became disorganized and did not reform until 8:00 am.

Price's attack had been delayed. Advancing his men through ravines and over hills, Price decided that his artillery would have to be left behind, although picked men from his batteries were to accompany the infantry to man the Union pieces that the attack expected to capture. Obstructions on the line of approach also disorganized Price's ranks. Price's advance was led by the 9th Missouri Sharpshooter Battalion, who sighted the Union positions on Graveyard Hill. Despite dawn beginning to be visible in the sky, Price misunderstood Holmes' order to attack at daylight and held back his troops, until Holmes came over to explain his orders. Meanwhile, Fagan's men attacked the second Union line of works. The 43rd Indiana Infantry Regiment had been facing Fagan's Confederates, and was reinforced by parts of the 33rd Iowa Infantry Regiment and the 35th Missouri Infantry Regiment, under orders from Salomon. Because Price had not yet attacked, Fagan's men came under fire from both Battery D and Battery C. Fagan's Confederates broke through the second Union line, then a third and fourth, but then halted at about 7:00 am, their attack spent. They were now in front of Battery D.

Marmaduke had his own problems in his sector on the line. Bledsoe's Missouri Battery was brought up to provide artillery support, and two of its guns opened on the Union positions. Marmaduke followed up the bombardment with an attack against Battery A, but fog that had concealed the advance dissipated and the attack was repulsed by the 29th Iowa, who mounted a counterattack. His dismounted cavalrymen were pushed back by the 29th Iowa and part of the 36th Iowa Infantry Regiment, and his flank was threatened by the 5th Kansas Cavalry Regiment and the 1st Indiana Cavalry Regiment, which were commanded by Powell Clayton. The two Union cavalry regiments were holding a position behind a levee. Bledsoe's two guns were driven off, but neither side could defeat the other. Walker's men had encountered the felled trees across their path of advance, and though he threw forward a skirmish line, most of his men remained back at the barricades. Walker's men spent the rest of the morning primarily skirmishing with Clayton's cavalry and firing at long range. Without Clayton's men first being driven from behind the levee, Rightor's Hill could not be taken.

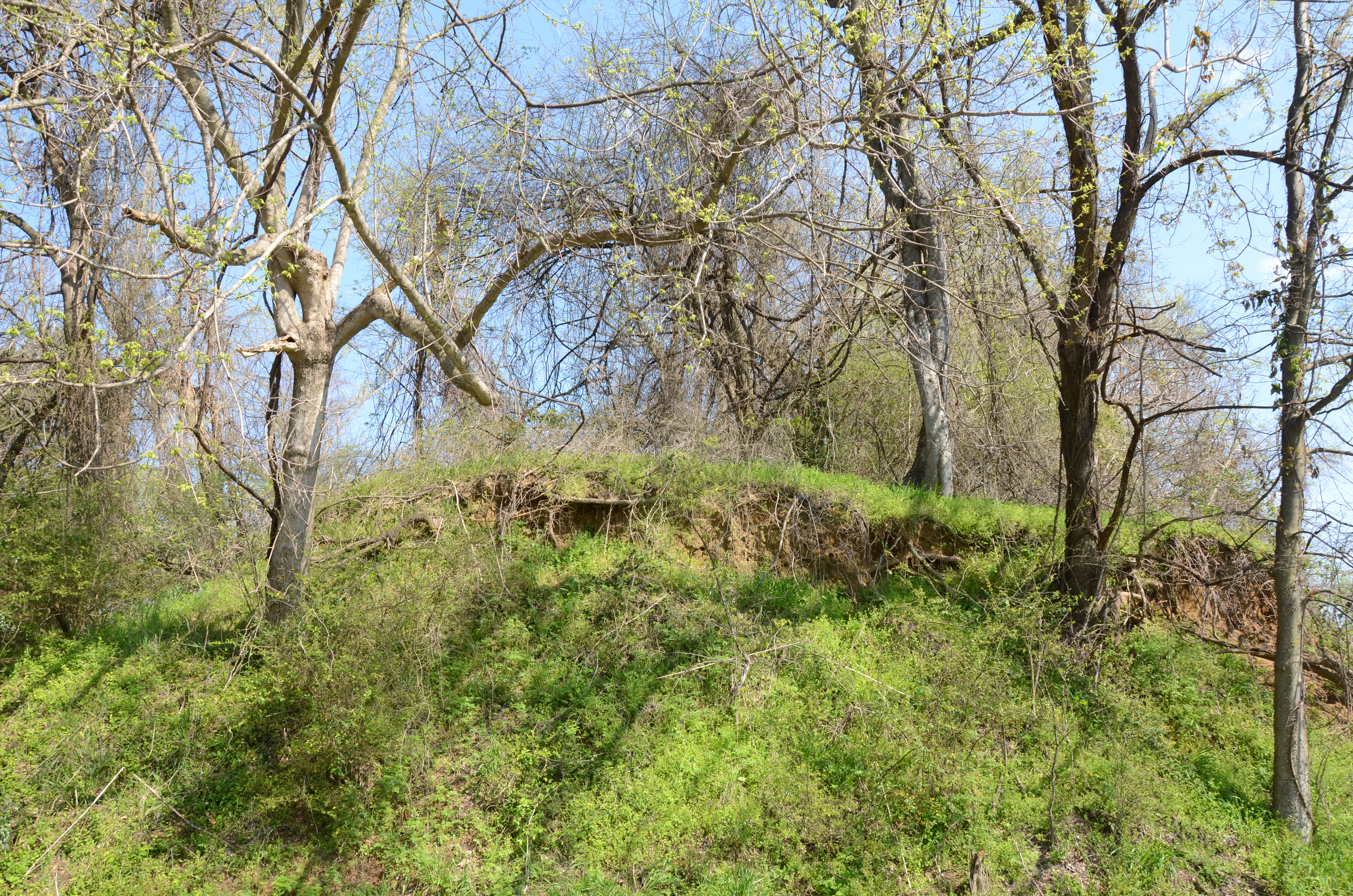
The ruins of Battery B in 2016

Around the time Fagan's men approached Battery D at 7:00 am, Price's attack began. Price's command consisted of the brigades of Brigadier Generals Dandridge McRae and Mosby Monroe Parsons, and was led by the 9th Missouri Sharpshooter Battalion and a company of Arkansans local to the Helena area. Confusion was initially caused by the two brigades being separated by a ridge and unable to see each other. Each wasted time waiting for the other to advance. The cannons in Battery C were manned by men from the 33rd Missouri Infantry Regiment, and they, along with a portion of the 33rd Iowa, poured a deadly fire into Parsons' men, while Battery B fired at McRae's brigade. The failure of the attacks on Batteries A and D allowed those positions to fire on Price's men, and Tyler and Fort Curtis added artillery fire as well; Tyler had moved to a different location that allowed for better fire on Graveyard Hill after suppressing Brooks' men. Price's Missouri sharpshooters found positions from which they could pick off the gunners in Battery C.

Price's first attack was repulsed, as was a second. On the third try, the Confederates managed to overrun Battery C, but the men from the 33rd Missouri had time to spike one cannon and take supplies necessary for firing before the Confederates captured the guns. Holmes and Price arrived on the hill, and finding that the Union guns could not be used, ordered Tilden's Missouri Battery and Marshall's Arkansas Battery to begin to come up. The advance up the hill had also thrown the Confederates into disarray. Carried by momentum, some of Price's infantry charged down the hill towards Helena itself, but were driven off. Many men from the 7th Missouri Infantry Regiment (Lewis') were captured at this time. A critical moment in the battle had arrived: if the Confederates could get enough artillery onto Graveyard Hill, they could shell the Union forces into submission. Prentiss ordered the other three batteries to fire on Graveyard Hill, as well as Tyler, two cannons in reserve, and four cannons from Battery K, 1st Missouri Light Artillery emplaced on Lower Little Rock Road. Confident that a single regiment could hold off Walker, Salomon pulled the 1st Indiana Cavalry towards Fort Curtis and a new line was formed in that vicinity using the Indiana cavalrymen and parts of the 33rd Iowa, 33rd Missouri, and 35th Missouri.

Fagan's men resumed the attack upon hearing the fighting on Graveyard Hill, and drove the 43rd Indiana and part of the 33rd Iowa from the final Union line in front of Battery D, but were unable to take the Battery itself, having been hit by crossfire while maneuvering through a ravine. Fagan's lines had been badly thinned by not only Union fire but also heat and exhaustion. Both Price and Holmes were issuing orders independently, and Holmes' orders were making things worse for the Confederates. Holmes ordered the 8th Missouri Infantry Regiment (Burns') to attack Fort Curtis, but upon seeing the regiment charge, the rest of Parsons' men joined in, believing a general attack was beginning. The Union guns concentrated on this attack and inflicted heavy casualties on it. The few who made it close to Fort Curtis were easily repulsed. Many Confederates surrendered. Holmes ordered Parsons to attack Battery D to support Fagan, but as Parsons' men were too badly disorganized at the time, McRae was given the order to attack. McRae sent about 200 men to attack the battery, but they were unsuccessful. Believing a full-fledged attack to be a suicide charge, McRae had his men simply fire on the rifle pits in hopes of diverting attention away from Fagan's command. Price then ordered Parsons to attack Battery D, but was informed that McRae had already been ordered to do that. (Note: Historian Ed Bearss and doctoral candidate G. David Schieffler indicate that the order to Parsons' regimental commander occurred before McRae's 200-man attack, but historian Mark K. Christ places the two events as occurring in the opposite order.)

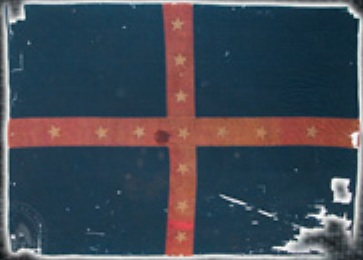
Regimental color of the 37th Arkansas captured at Helena

With Price's men shredded, Fagan's men exhausted, and the cavalry not making any progress, Holmes decided to order a withdrawal at 10:30 am. Price's men fell back and abandoned Graveyard Hill. About 100 men remained behind on the hill, pinned down by Union fire. A Union counterattack retook the hill and captured many prisoners, with over 350 prisoners taken on Graveyard Hill alone. Between 10:30 and 11:00 am, Fagan received orders to retreat from before Battery D. Part of the 37th Arkansas Infantry Regiment was trapped during the retreat and was captured. Including the men of the 37th Arkansas, about 250 Confederates surrendered in Fagan's sector. The Union troops had taken advantage of the severe disorganization and scattering of the Confederate forces to take the prisoners. Either around the time that Battery C fell to Price's attack or as Fagan's withdrawal was ending, Brooks placed a 6-pounder field gun on a hilltop and began to fire on the Union positions, but Battery K, 1st Missouri Light Artillery and Tyler drove it off. Marmaduke received orders to withdraw at about 11:00 am, but being angry at Walker over Walker's failure to support his attack and believing that Walker faced only a small force, decided against informing Walker of his retreat. After Marmaduke's withdrawal, Union troops attempted to attack Walker's flank, but the Confederate cavalrymen withdrew from the field before they were caught. Walker's withdrawal occurred at about 2:00 pm. Historian Robert E. Shalhope wrote that the Confederate attacks were repulsed "perhaps less by the powerful Union entrenchments than by their own poorly co-ordinated attack".

== Aftermath ==
Holmes lost 1,636 of the 7,646 men he had taken into the battle: 173 killed, 687 wounded, and 776 missing. Prentiss claimed the capture of more than 1,100 Confederate soldiers and stated that over 300 dead Confederates were buried by Union troops. Almost all of the Confederate losses were from the brigades of Fagan, Parsons, and McRae, who took 32 percent of their attacking forces as casualties. Walker lost only 12 men; historian Mark Christ attributes this to the weakness of his attack. According to Christ, Prentiss lost 220 of the 4,129 men he took into battle: 57 killed, 127 wounded, and 36 missing. The historian Ed Bearss reports Union losses as 57 killed, 146 wounded, and 36 missing for a total of 239, and historian Thomas W. Cutrer provides the same figures as Bearss. Casualties were heaviest among the 33rd Iowa and the 33rd Missouri, while the 2nd Arkansas Infantry Regiment (African Descent) saw the first combat wounds suffered by African American soldiers in Arkansas during the war. The unit had not completed formation at the time of the battle and was poorly trained, so it had been positioned in an area where it was unlikely to be directly engaged. (Note: Union media later greatly embellished the role played by the regiment in the fighting.) Holmes accused McRae of "misbehavior before the enemy", and in his report placed part of the blame for the failure on McRae, but McRae was cleared by a subsequent court-martial. The battle also destroyed any positive relationships remaining between Holmes and Price, with the former believing that the latter should have reinforced Fagan. Both Holmes and Marmaduke accused Walker of dereliction of duty.

Most of the Confederates withdrew from the area the next morning, falling back to Jacksonport, although Walker's men remained behind to harass any Union troops that sallied forth from the city. Believing that the Confederates were preparing to attack again, Prentiss requested reinforcements, which arrived from Memphis, Tennessee, on July 6. Vicksburg had surrendered on July 4, and the Confederate garrison at Port Hudson, Louisiana fell within a week. News also reached the Union forces at Helena of a major Union victory at the Battle of Gettysburg in Pennsylvania. With the fall of Vicksburg and Port Hudson, the Confederate forces in the Trans-Mississippi were cut off from the rest of the Confederacy. Confederate infantry deserted in large numbers, their morale shattered. The Confederate repulse at Helena had preserved the Union bridgehead in eastern Arkansas, and had parried an attempt to break Union control of the Mississippi River.

Helena was reinforced and in mid-August, Union forces began a campaign against Little Rock, with Helena as the staging ground. Price commanded the Confederate forces during the campaign, as Holmes had fallen ill. Events during this campaign worsened the split between Marmaduke and Walker, and the former killed the latter in a duel on September 6. On September 10, Union troops took Little Rock. The Helena Confederate Cemetery includes burials of Confederate soldiers killed during the battle, and is listed on the National Register of Historic Places, as are the remains of the Union batteries.

== See also ==
- List of American Civil War battles
- Troop engagements of the American Civil War, 1863
- Helena Batteries

== Bibliography ==
- Bearss, Edwin C. (1961). "The Battle of Helena, July 4, 1863". Arkansas Historical Quarterly. 20 (3): 256–297. doi:10.2307/40038050. ISSN 0004-1823. JSTOR 40038050.
- Castel, Albert E. (1993) [1968]. General Sterling Price and the Civil War in the West. Baton Rouge, Louisiana: Louisiana State University Press. ISBN 978-0-8071-1854-2.
- Christ, Mark K. (2010). Civil War Arkansas 1863: The Battle for a State. Norman, Oklahoma: University of Oklahoma Press. ISBN 978-0-8061-4433-7.
- Cutrer, Thomas W. (2017). Theater of a Separate War: The Civil War West of the Mississippi River 1861–1865. Chapel Hill, North Carolina: University of North Carolina Press. ISBN 978-1-4696-3156-1.
- DeBlack, Thomas A. (1994). "1863: "We Must Stand or Fall Alone"". In Christ, Mark K. (ed.). Rugged and Sublime: The Civil War in Arkansas. Fayetteville, Arkansas: University of Arkansas Press. ISBN 978-1-55728-356-6.
- Gurley, Bill (2013). "Mosby Monroe Parsons: Missouri's Forgotten Brigadier". In Schott, Thomas E.; Bergeron, Arthur W.; Hewitt, Lawrence L. (eds.). Confederate Generals in the Trans-Mississippi. Vol. 1. Knoxville, Tennessee: University of Tennessee Press. ISBN 978-1-57233-985-9.
- Kerby, Robert L. (1972). Kirby Smith's Confederacy: The Trans-Mississippi South, 1863–1865 (University of Alabama paperback ed.). Tuscaloosa, Alabama: University of Alabama Press. ISBN 978-0-8173-0546-8.
- Moneyhon, Carl (1994). "1861: "The Die is Cast"". In Christ, Mark K. (ed.). Rugged and Sublime: The Civil War in Arkansas. Fayetteville, Arkansas: University of Arkansas Press. pp. 1–19. ISBN 978-1-55728-356-6.
- Schieffler, G. David (2017). Civil War in the Delta: Environment, Race, and the 1863 Helena Campaign (PhD). University of Arkansas. OCLC 1078690836.
- Schieffler, G. David (2018). "Timber, Torrents, and the Trans-Mississippi Mud March". The History Teacher. 52 (1): 9–47. ISSN 0018-2745. JSTOR 26646471.
- Shalhope, Robert E. (1971). Sterling Price: Portrait of a Southerner. Columbia, Missouri: University of Missouri Press. ISBN 978-0-8262-0103-4.
- Silverstone, Paul H. (1989). Warships of the Civil War Navies. Annapolis, Maryland: Naval Institute Press. ISBN 0-87021-783-6.
