= Bayou Meto =

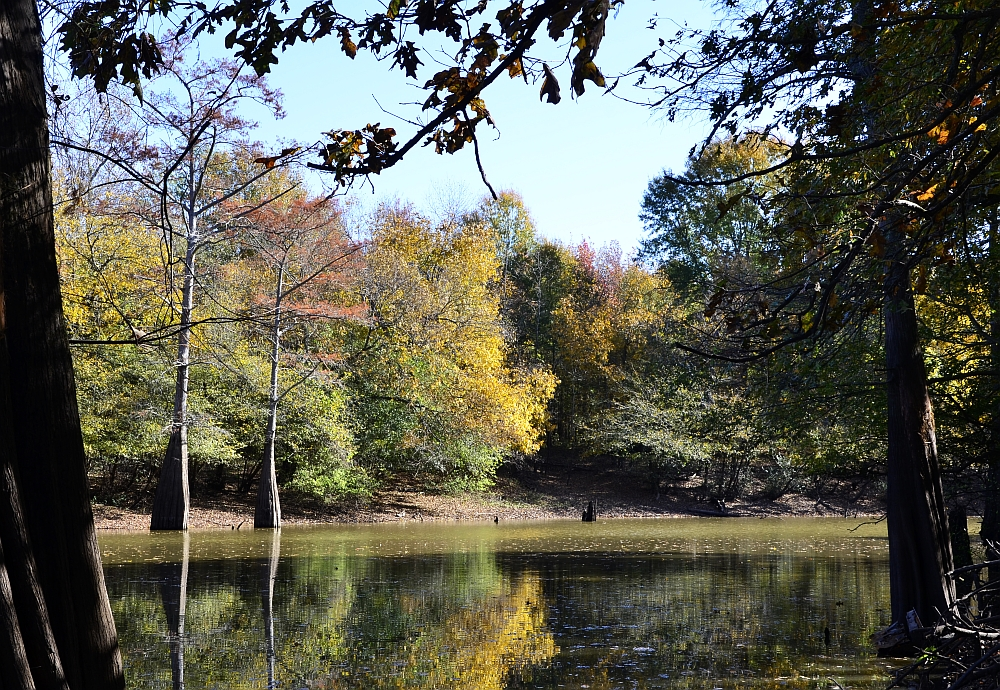
- Bayou Meto flowing through Henton Township

Location
- Country: United States
- State: Arkansas

Physical characteristics
- Source
  - location: Wilson Hill, Faulkner County
  - coordinates: 35°00′04″N 92°17′05″W
- Mouth
  - location: Arkansas River
  - coordinates: 34°04′52″N 91°26′36″W
- Length: 150 mi (240 km)

Basin features
- River system: Mississippi River

Bayou Meto is a tributary of the Arkansas River in the U.S. state of Arkansas. Its headwaters are at Wilson Hill, in Faulkner County, Arkansas a few miles east of Camp Robinson State Wildlife Management Area. Bayou Meto meanders 150 miles (240 kilometers) southeast, feeding into the Arkansas River a few miles southwest of Gillett, in Arkansas County, Arkansas.

Bayou Meto is a habitat for a wide variety of fish, waterfowl, mammals and reptiles.

== See also ==
- List of rivers of Arkansas
