= Battle of Prairie Grove order of battle: Confederate =

This is the Confederate order of battle for the Battle of Prairie Grove. The offensive was fought in the Trans-Mississippi Theater of the American Civil War on Sunday, December 7, 1862, between Confederate forces and the United States (Union) in the Boston Mountain region of northwestern Arkansas.

== Abbreviations used ==
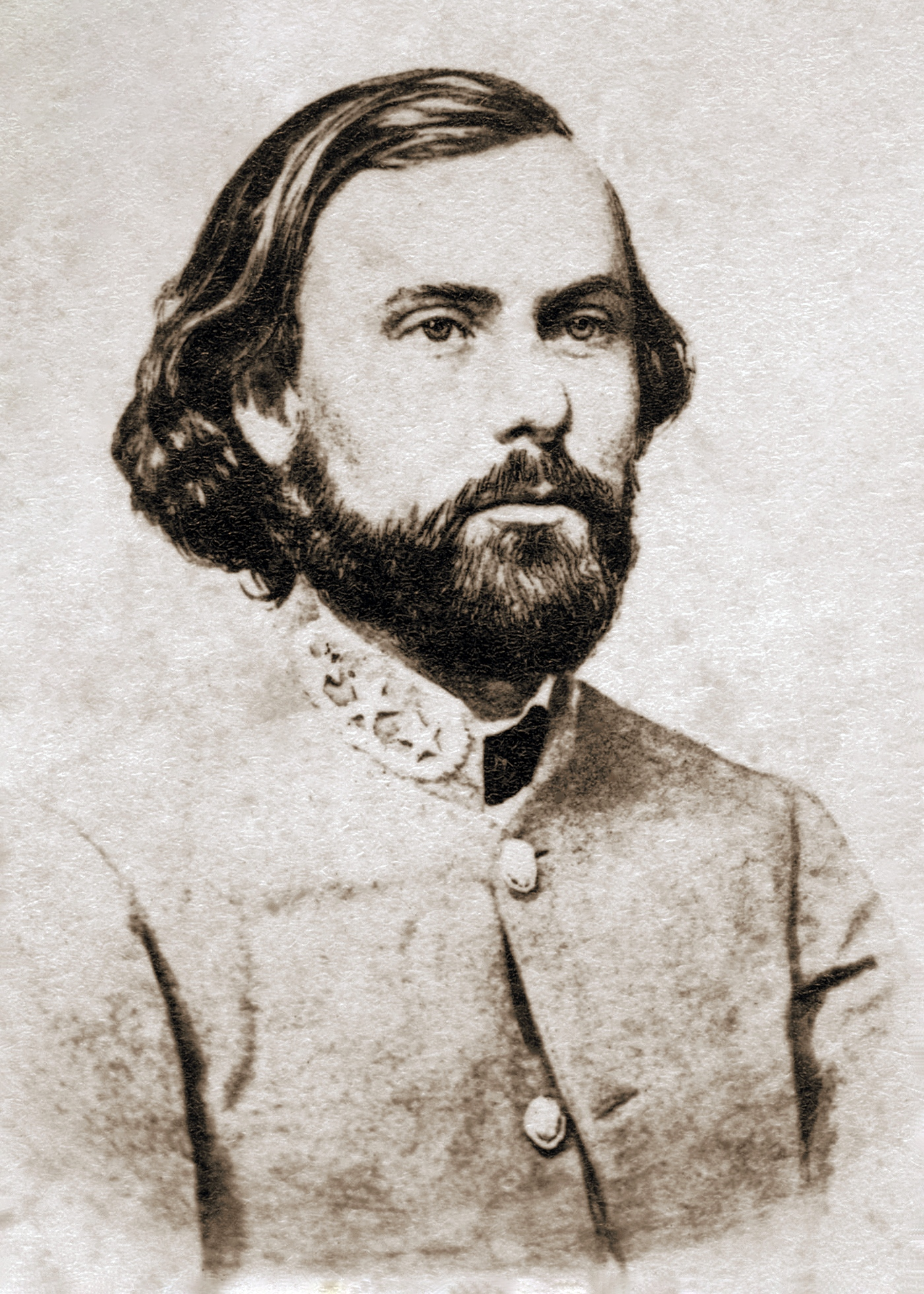
MG Thomas C. Hindman, commanding First Corps, Trans-Mississippi Army

=== Military rank ===
- MG = Major-General
- BG = Brigadier-General
- Col = Colonel
- Ltc = Lieutenant-Colonel
- Maj = Major
- Cpt = Captain

=== Other ===
- k = killed
- w = wounded
- m = missing

== First Corps, Trans-Mississippi Army ==
Headquarters
MG Thomas C. Hindman (12,059)

Division	Brigade	Regiments and Others
Second Division; BG Francis A. Shoup (3,219)	First Brigade BG James F. Fagan (1,555)	Hawthorn's Arkansas - Col Alexander T. Hawthorn (291); 22d Arkansas - Col James P. King (400); 29th Arkansas - Col Joseph C. Pleasants (304); 34th Arkansas - Col William H. Brooks (400); Chew's Battalion - Maj Robert E. Chew (k) (115); Blocher's Battery - Cpt William D. Blocher (45 men, two 6 pound smooth bore cannon, two 12 pound field howitzers)
Second Division; BG Francis A. Shoup (3,219)	Second Brigade Col Dandridge McRae (1,664)	26th Arkansas - Col Asa S. Morgan (412); 28th Arkansas - Ltc John E. Glenn (497); 30th Arkansas - Col Archibald J. McNeill (304); 32d Arkansas - Ltc Charles L. Young (k) (370); Woodruff's Battery - Cpt John G. Marshall (78 men, two 6 pound smooth bore cannon, two 12 pound field howitzers)
Third Division; BG Daniel M. Frost (6,058)	First Brigade BG Mosby M. Parsons (3,111)	Mitchell's Missouri - Ltc Charles S. Mitchell (440); 7th Missouri - Col Josiah H. Caldwell (754); 8th Missouri - Col Dewitt C. Hunter (684); 9th Missouri - Ltc Willis M. Ponder (476); 10th Missouri - Col Alexander E. Steen (k) (560); 9th Missouri Sharpshooters - Maj Lebbeus A. Pindall (123); Tilden's Battery - Cpt Charles B. Tilden (74 men, two 6 pound smooth bore cannon, two 12 pound field howitzers)
Third Division; BG Daniel M. Frost (6,058)	Second Brigade Col Robert G. Shaver (815)	Adams' Arkansas - Col Charles W. Adams (305); 27th Arkansas (Note: The unit participated in the campaign, but was not present at the battle of Prairie Grove.) - Col James R. Shaler; 33d Arkansas - Col Hiram L. Grinstead (306); 38th Arkansas - Ltc William C. Adams (140); Roberts' Battery - Cpt Westley Roberts (64 men, two 14-pounder James rifles, two six pound smooth bore cannon)
Third Division; BG Daniel M. Frost (6,058)	Second Brigade, First Division (Note: Attached.) BG John S. Roane (2,132)	20th Texas Cavalry (Note: Dismounted Cavalry.) - Col Thomas C. Bass (228); 22d Texas Cavalry (Note: Dismounted Cavalry.) - Maj Robert D. Stone (429); 31st Texas Cavalry (Note: Dismounted Cavalry.) - Ltc George W. Guess (284); 34th Texas Cavalry (Note: Dismounted Cavalry.) - Col Almarine M. Alexander (491); 9th Missouri - Col John B. Clark (564); Reid's Battery - Cpt John G. Reid (37 men, two 6 pound smooth bore cannon); Shoup's Battery - Cpt James C. Shoup (98 men, three mountain howitzers, two 25 pound mountain howitzers)
Fourth Division; BG John S. Marmaduke (2,782)	First Brigade Col James C. Monroe (500)	Carroll's Arkansas Cavalry - Ltc Lee L. Thomson (225 men); Monroe's Arkansas Cavalry - Maj Andrew N. Johnson (225 men)
Fourth Division; BG John S. Marmaduke (2,782)	Second Brigade Col Joseph O. Shelby (1,475)	1st Missouri Cavalry - Ltc B. Frank Gordon (338); 2d Missouri Cavalry - Col Beal G. Jeans (334); 3d Missouri Cavalry - Col Gideon W. Thompson (333); Elliot's Cavalry Battalion - Maj Benjamin Elliott (101); Quantrill's Company - Lt William Gregg (33) (Note: Including Frank and Jesse James.); Bledsoe's Battery - Cpt Joseph Bledsoe (36 men, two six pound smooth bore cannon)
Fourth Division; BG John S. Marmaduke (2,782)	MacDonald's Brigade Col Emmett MacDonald (807)	MacDonald's Missouri Cavalry - Ltc Merrit L. Young (202); 1st Texas Partisan Rangers - Ltc R. Phillip Crump (544); West's Battery - Cpt Henry C. West (61 men, one 6 pound smooth bore cannon, two 12 pound field howitzers)
