= Battle of Helena order of battle =

The following Union and Confederate Army units and commanders fought in the Battle of Helena of the American Civil War on July 4, 1863.

== Abbreviations used ==
=== Military rank ===
- LTG = Lieutenant General
- MG = Major General
- BG = Brigadier General
- Col = Colonel
- Ltc = Lieutenant Colonel
- Maj = Major
- Cpt = Captain

=== Other ===
- w = wounded
- mw = mortally wounded
- k = killed

== Union ==
=== District of East Arkansas ===
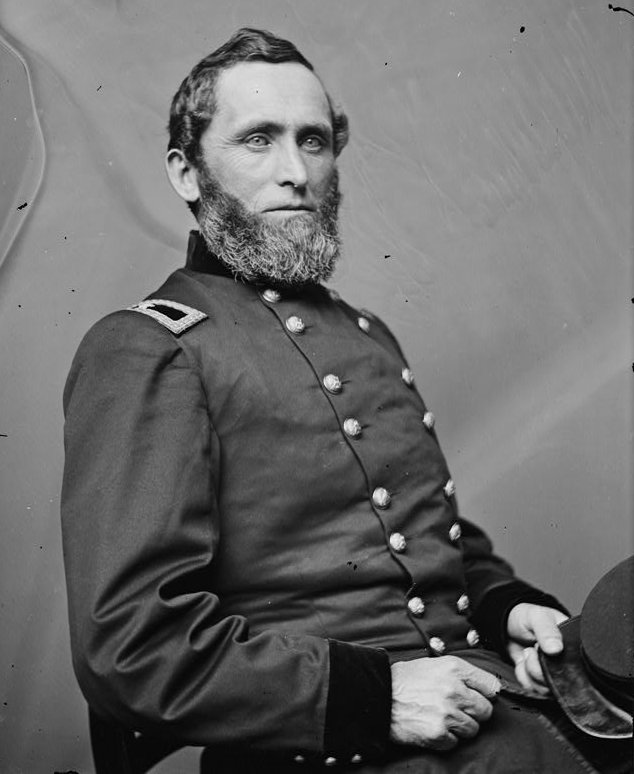
MG Prentiss

MG Benjamin M. Prentiss

Division	Brigade	Regiments and others
District of East Arkansas	Cavalry Brigade; K-5, W-18, M-1 = 24 Col Powell Clayton	1st Indiana Cavalry and Battery - Ltc Thomas Pace; 5th Kansas Cavalry - Ltc Wilton A. Jenkins
District of East Arkansas	Artillery; K-0, W-1, M-0 = 1	3rd Battery, Iowa Light Artillery - Lt Melvin Wright; Battery K, 1st Missouri Light Artillery - Lt John O'Connell
District of East Arkansas	Unattached; K-0, W-0, M-0 = 0	2nd Arkansas Colored Infantry - Maj George W. Burchard
1st Division (XIII Corps); BG Frederick Salomon	1st Brigade; K-9, W-28, M-5 = 42 Col William E. McLean	43rd Indiana - Ltc John C. Major; 35th Missouri - Ltc Horace Fitch; 28th Wisconsin - Ltc Edmund B. Gray
1st Division (XIII Corps); BG Frederick Salomon	2nd Brigade; K-43, W-99, M-30 = 172 Col Samuel A. Rice	29th Iowa - Col Thomas Hart Benton II; 33rd Iowa - Ltc Cyrus H. Mackey; 36th Iowa - Col Charles W. Kittredge; 33rd Missouri - Ltc William H. Heath

== Confederate ==
=== District of Arkansas ===
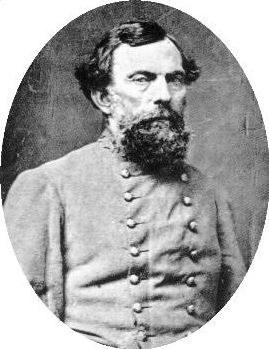
LTG Holmes

LTG Theophilus H. Holmes

Division	Brigade	Regiments and others
Price's Division; MG Sterling Price	First Brigade; K-46, W-168, M-133 = 347 BG Dandridge McRae	32nd Arkansas Infantry Regiment - Col Lucien C. Gause; 36th Arkansas Infantry Regiment - Col John E. Glenn; 39th (30th) Arkansas Infantry Regiment - Col Robert A. Hart (w); Arkansas Artillery Battery - Cpt John G. Marshall
Price's Division; MG Sterling Price	Second Brigade; K-47, W-115, M-273 = 435 BG James F. Fagan	Hawthorn's Arkansas Infantry Regiment - Col Alexander T. Hawthorn; 34th Arkansas Infantry Regiment - Col William H. Brooks; 35th Arkansas Infantry Regiment - Col James P. King; 37th Arkansas Infantry Regiment - Col Samuel S. Bell (w & c); Denson's Cavalry - Cpt William B. Denson; Arkansas Battery - Cpt William D. Blocker
Price's Division; MG Sterling Price	Fourth Brigade; K-59, W-326, M-368 = 753 BG Mosby M. Parsons	7th Missouri Infantry Regiment - Col Levin M. Lewis; 8th Missouri Infantry Regiment - Col Simon P. Burns; 9th Missouri Infantry Regiment - Col James D. White; 10th Missouri Infantry Regiment - Col Alexander C. Pickett; 9th Battalion, Missouri Sharpshooters - Maj Lebbeus A. Pindall; 3rd Field Battery Missouri Light Artillery - Cpt Charles B. Tilden
Marmaduke's Division; BG John S. Marmaduke	First Brigade; K-8, W-37, M-10 = 55 BG Joseph O. Shelby	5th Missouri Cavalry Regiment - Ltc B. Frank Gordon; 6th Missouri Cavalry Regiment - Col Gideon W. Thompson; Jeans' Cavalry - Col Beal G. Jeans; 1st Missouri Cavalry Battalion - Maj Benjamin Elliott; Bledsoe's Missouri Battery - Cpt Joseph Bledsoe
Marmaduke's Division; BG John S. Marmaduke	Second Brigade; K-5, W-7, M-0 = 12 Col Colton Greene	3rd Missouri Cavalry Regiment - Ltc Leonidas C. Campbell; 8th Missouri Cavalry Regiment - Col William L. Jeffers; Young's Cavalry Battalion - Ltc Merritt L. Young; Bell's Missouri Battery - Cpt Charlie O. Bell
Walker's Division; BG Lucius M. Walker	K-4, W-8, M-0 = 12	5th Arkansas Cavalry Regiment - Col Robert C. Newton; 1st Arkansas Cavalry Regiment- Col Archibald S. Dobbins

== See also ==
- List of orders of battle
