= 22nd Arkansas Infantry Regiment =

Infantry regiment of the Confederate States Army

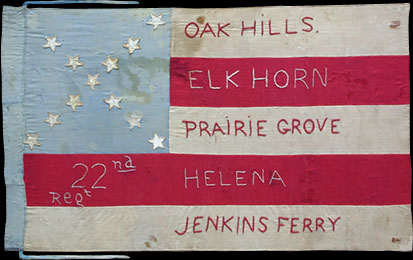
- Regimental color of the 22nd Arkansas at the Old State House Museum in Little Rock, Arkansas
- Active: 1861–1865
- Disbanded: June 9, 1865
- Country: Confederate States
- Allegiance: Arkansas
- Branch: Army
- Type: Regiment
- Role: Infantry
- Facings: Light blue
- Battles: American Civil War; Battle of Oak Hills; Battle of Elk Horn; Battle of Prairie Grove; Battle of Helena; Battle of Mansfield; Battle of Pleasant Hill; Battle of Jenkins' Ferry
- Battle honors: Oak Hills; Elk Horn; Prairie Grove; Helena; Jenkins Ferry

The 22nd Arkansas Infantry Regiment was an infantry formation of the Confederate States Army in the Trans-Mississippi Theater of the American Civil War.

Originally formed as the 17th Arkansas Infantry Regiment; it was reorganized after the Battle of Elk Horn as 1st Regiment, Northwest Division, Trans-Mississippi Department, or Rector's War Regiment; redesignated as the 35th Arkansas in the summer of 1862; and reorganized and redesignated as the 22nd Arkansas following the Battle of Prairie Grove. It was also known as King's regiment or McCord's regiment. This was the second regiment to be officially designated as the 22nd Arkansas. The first was mustered in at DeValls Bluff, Arkansas, on April 9, 1862, and later reorganized as the 20th Arkansas Infantry Regiment.

== Formation ==
The core of what became the 22nd Arkansas Infantry Regiment was originally organized as the 17th Arkansas Infantry Regiment, which was organized at Fort Smith, Arkansas, November 17, 1861. The regiment was originally composed of volunteer companies from Sebastian, Washington, Madison and Hempstead Counties,

The 17th Arkansas's first major action was the Battle of Elk Horn in March 1862 where, from some accounts, Rector's regiment did not acquit itself well. A Missouri (Confederate) artillery battery allegedly found the regiment's colors lying on the field, and for a time refused to return the flag to Rector, saying that a regiment that would abandon its colors in battle had no right to carry them after the battle. On March 20, 1862, Colonel Rector tendered his resignation as Colonel of the 17th Arkansas Infantry, On May 20, 1862, the Lieutenant Colonel Griffith and the officers of the regiment who were with General Van Dorn east of the Mississippi demanded a court of inquiry to attempt to clear the regiment's name.

Whatever the truth behind the 17th Arkansas's retreat and break up following the Battle of Elk Horn, by early May 1862 Colonel Rector and portions of Companies A, B, C, and G were still in Arkansas and the balance of the regiment was at Corinth, Mississippi, with the Army of the West, under the command of Lieutenant Colonel John Griffith. A battalion-sized 17th Arkansas fought at the Battle of Corinth, and this portion of the regiment would go on to form the 11th/17th Consolidated Mounted Infantry.

== Reorganization ==
Meanwhile, back in Arkansas, Governor Henry Rector issued an address on May 5, 1862, calling for the formation of 30 new infantry companies and 20 new cavalry companies. Governor Rector indicated that if there were insufficient volunteers to fill these new companies, a draft would be made upon the militia regiments and brigades. As a further enticement, Rector also indicated that these regiments were for home defense and that they would not be transferred to Confederate Service without their consent. Many new volunteer companies were organized from the militia regiments in the summer of 1862. It appears that the militiamen decided it was better to enlist and remain together, and be allowed to elect their own officers, rather than to wait for forced conscription under new Confederate Conscription laws, which were being strictly enforced during the summer of 1862. Colonel Rector's much reduced former regiment, the remaining portions of Companies A, B, C, and G, were reinforced with troops, many of whom were came from the 58th Regiment Arkansas Militia regiment of Franklin County, the 15th Regiment Arkansas Militia of Pope County, and the 10th Militia Regiment of Johnson County.

Colonel Rector's new reorganized regiment, was initially organized at Camp Johnson, on July 11, 1862, near Fort Smith, Arkansas, as the "1st Regiment, Northwest Division, Trans-Mississippi Department" with 1037 men. They were also called Rector's War Regiment, 1st Arkansas Volunteers. The reorganized regiment consisted of the following companies:

- Company A – Enlisted 12 June 1862, at Fort Smith, commanded by Captain A.J. Cline. This company was made up of men who transferred from Companies B, C, and F, of the 17th Arkansas Infantry.
- Company B – Enlisted 19 Jun 1862 at Ft Smith, commanded by Captain James C. Bourland.
- Company C – Enlisted 9–22 June 1862 at Fort Smith, commanded by Captain George W. Bennett.
- Company D – Enlisted 27 June 1862 at Greenwood, commanded by Captain John M. Inge.
- Company E – Enlisted 25 Jun 1862 at Charleston, commanded by Captain unknown. These men were largely from Franklin County and many had been present when the 58th Regiment Militia of Franklin County had been activated in February 1862 during the Pea Ridge Campaign.
- Company F – The first Company F was transferred to the 11th Missouri Infantry on August 27, 1862, and was replaced by a new Company F from which had enlisted 15 Aug 1862 in Benton County, commanded by Captain John Miser.
- Company G – “The Brown Guards,” enlisted 18 June 1862 at Van Buren, under the command of Captain James P. King. When Captain King was appointed Major of the regiment, Captain Robert Miles succeeded him. This company included many men who had previously served in the Frontier Guards of Van Buren Crawford County. The Frontier Guards had been organized as a volunteer militia company in the 5th Regiment, Arkansas State Militia, on January 5, 1860, under the command of Captain Hugh T. Brown and had been assigned to the 3rd Regiment, Arkansas State Troops. Captain Brown was killed during the Battle of Oak Hills. After that battle, the State Troops had returned to Arkansas mustered out of service on September 19, 1861. The company reformed under the command of Captain J.P. King, who had served as a Lieutenant under Captain Brown and the Company was renamed in Brown's honor.
- Company H – Enlisted 20 June 1862 at Dover, Pope County, Arkansas, under the command of Captain James E. Truett. Many men in this company had been activated with the 15th Regiment, Arkansas Militia of Pope County in February 1862 during the Pea Ridge Campaign.
- Company I – Enlisted 20 June 1862 at Dover, Arkansas, under the command of Captain Joseph Howard. Most of the men in this company were from Johnson county and many had been activated with the 10th Regiment, Arkansas State Militia of Johnson County in February 1862 during the Pea Ridge Campaign.
- Company K – New enlistments on 4 July at Fort Smith, under the command of Captain William Johnson, This company included several men who had previously served Company G, 17th Arkansas Infantry, in a company originally enlisted in Madison County in November 1861. A few men has also previously served in either the 16th Arkansas Infantry or Stirman's Battalion.

Its commanding officers were Colonels Frank Rector, James George, James P. King and Henry J. McCord, Lieutenant Colonel John W. Wallace, and Majors John J. Dillard and Mark T. Tatum. The regiment was originally composed of eight companies mostly from Sebastian County and the surrounding area.

== American Civil War ==
=== 1862 ===
Two other new regiments were raised under Governor Rector's plan, Brooks' 2nd Arkansas and Adams' 3rd Arkansas. On May 31, 1862, Major General Thomas Hindman was assigned as the Commander of the District of the Trans-Mississippi. General Hindman found that Major General Van Dorn had stripped the state of almost all organized forces and immediately began organizing a new Confederate Army in Arkansas, by vigorously enforcing the new Confederate Conscription Act. General Hindman also demanded that Governor Rector cease organizing State Troops and transfer all unit to the Confederate Army. This ultimately resulted in the three new regiments that Governor Rector had intended to be State Troops, being enrolled as new Confederate Regiments and numbered accordingly. These regiments would become Rector's 35th Arkansas Infantry Regiment and Brook's 34th Arkansas Infantry Regiment.

On July 5, 1862, Colonel Frank A. Rector was reported to be north of the Arkansas River, en route to Fayetteville, with some 400 men mounted, and not well armed. On 11 July 1862, Rector appointed Colonel of the 1st Regiment, Northwest Division, Trans-Mississippi Department. On the same day Captain James Georges was appointed Lieutenant Colonel and Capt James P King was appointed Major. The muster rolls of the Field and Staff state that the regiment was stationed at Camp Johnson from 11 July 1862 to 7 August 1862. On 17 July 1862, Capt. Green of the Union army reported intelligence that Col Rector had passed 15 miles east and south of Tahlequah on the 14th (July) en route for Fort Gibson to join Cooper in Indian Territory.

On 26 July 1862, Colonel Rector sent a letter from Col John Griffith to Richmond, requesting that the balance of Rector's regiment be ordered to join Colonel Griffith on the east side of the Mississippi River where the 17th Arkansas was then serving. The next day, Colonel Carroll, commanding the Northwest Division, Trans-Mississippi Department, wrote to Major General Hindman and reported that Rector's Regiment was not yet armed. For reasons that remain unclear, Colonel Rector stepped down as Colonel in early August 1862 and by 11 August 1862, Rector had filed his bond to begin service as the Brigade Quartermaster for Colonel Carroll's command, in the rank of Major. Lieutenant Colonel James George assumed command of the regiment following Colonel Rector's departure.

Sometime in early September 1862 the 35th Arkansas and 34th Arkansas Infantry Regiments moved to Elm Springs, 12 miles (19 km) northwest of Fayetteville which was a training camp designed for 5,000. Here the regiment continued to drill. On September 14, 1862, James P. King became colonel of the Regiment. King had served in Gratiot's 3rd Regiment, Arkansas State Troops as a 1st Lieutenant of the Crawford County “Frontier Guards”. During the Battle of Oak Hills, August 10, 1861, the captain of Company G had been killed and King assumed command of the company. It is unclear where King served between the disbanding of Pearce's State Troops in September 1862 and June 1862. If he did serve during this time, it was likely in Colonel Rector's 17th Arkansas Infantry but, he is not shown in the records of that regiment. After the battle of Elk Horn when the remnants of the 17th Arkansas were reorganized to become the 35th Arkansas, James P. King became captain of Company G.

At Elm Springs the 35th along with the other units in training were ordered to turn over their weapons to the ordnance department. The purpose would have been to convert as many of the weapons as possible to standard percussion cap weapons. In this unarmed state the regiments drilled. Supplies and clothing dribbled through and the men began to rely less and less on homemade knapsacks and haversacks. In mid-September the unit was ordered to Elkhorn. Soon they retraced their path back to Elm Springs. At this time the Federals advanced toward the southwestern part of Missouri. General Holmes summoned General Hindman to Little Rock. Federal cavalry was reported to be marching with all speed to capture the three unarmed regiments. Under orders from General Rains the regiments marched south heading to Judge Walker's farm in southern Washington County. The march was hampered by torrential rains and took two days to cover 15 miles (24 km). Captain Fontaine Richard Earle of Company B, 34th Arkansas said “it seemed as if the heavens had been overcrowded with water and that the flood-gates had been opened for relief.”

During the retreat there were many desertions. The regiment moved to Spadra Bluff on the Arkansas River near Van Buren, occupying winter quarters that had been built by a Texas cavalry unit the previous winter. The regiment that had formed with more than 1,000 men in July, numbered approximately 400 men by the time of the Battle of Prairie Grove. They remained here for almost a month and continued their training. Here weapons were supplied, Enfield rifles.

On November 15, 1862, General Hindman moved the Arkansas infantry to Massard Prairie, 3 miles (4.8 km) southeast of Fort Smith to drill and organize the divisions. The 35th Arkansas was assigned to Brigadier General James F. Fagan's 1st Brigade of Brigadier General Frances A. Shoup's 2nd Division, of Major General Thomas Carmichael Hindman's 1st Corps of Lieutenant General Theophilus Holmes's Army of the Trans-Mississippi. The unit was brigaded with the 34th Arkansas Infantry Regiment commanded by Colonel William H. Brooks, the 29th Arkansas Infantry Regiment, commanded by Colonel Joseph C. Pleasants, the 39th Arkansas Infantry Regiment, commanded by Colonel Alexander T. Hawthorne and Chew's Arkansas Infantry Battalion, commanded by Major Robert E. Chew.

At the very end of November the cavalry was sent north toward Washington County. Early in December the infantry followed heading north. The 35th Arkansas crossed the Arkansas River on December 2, 1862. On December 4, the column reached Oliver's Store on Lee Creek in the Boston Mountains, were battle flags were presented to the regiments of the division.

On December 6, 1862 Fagan's brigade arrived at Morrow's and controlled all the approaches to Cane Hill from the south and east. Hindman then learned of the approach of General Herron, who had two divisions just north of Fayetteville. Hindman planned to get behind the Federal division of General Blunt and prevent General Herron's division from combining with Gen. Blunt. Upon reaching the high ground at Prairie Grove on December 7, Hindman’ s army formed on ridge overlooking Crawford Prairie and Fagan's brigade was advanced to a position fifty yards from the Borden Orchard. The position was very good and there the army waited for Herron to advance. Brook's regiment was posted behind an artillery battery. Around 2:00 pm the artillery duel started. Blocher's Battery, which was part of Fagan's brigade became a lightning rod for Federal artillery and later infantry. The 20th Wisconsin advanced to take the battery and when their right flank was 50 yards away from their Brook's 34th Arkansas rose and fired into them. The regiment was ordered forward along with Chew's Arkansas Infantry Battalion and Hawthorne's regiment. The 20th Wisconsin was driven back and the battery was retaken. As the Confederate counterattack came off the ridge and onto the prairie they came under heavy fire and retreated to their position in the ravine. As the Confederates were reorganizing another Federal attack was launched. This time the 37th Illinois advanced to the summit. Again the Fagan's brigade rose out of the scrub and fired a point blank volley and charged. The two forces locked in hand-to-hand fighting. Again the Confederates followed the retreating Federals and ran into heavy fire. As the brigade resumed their position on the summit, the tempo of the battle slowed and shifted to another part of the battlefield. They stayed in position until nearly midnight when the order to retreat came. During the march over the Boston Mountains many of the men deserted to their homes. In April 1862, Colonel King wrote home to his mother and had this to say about the regiment, "The fight at Prairie Grove notwithstanding. We whipped it proved to be a very disastrous one to us. My loss in the fight was a very heavy one. I lost one hundred and thirty two men, killed and wounded out of less than five hundred men. I still have a fine Regt. and am ready for another fight. We have a very fine army here and will move in a few days but where to I can't tell."

=== 1863 ===
After the retreat from Prairie Grove to Van Buren, Fagan's brigade spent the winter of 1863-64 in camp near Little Rock, remaining there until June when the unit began the movements that would lead to the Battle of Helena. Fagan's Brigade was assigned to Major General Sterling Price's Division of Lieutenant General Theophilus H. Holmes's army during the attack on Union forces at Helena Arkansas on July 4, 1863. General Fagan's 1,300 men were assigned to capture Hindman's Hill southwest of the city. Generals Fagan and Price failed to coordinate their attacks due to General Holmes' vague order to "attack at daylight." Price interpreted this order to mean an attack at sunrise and Fagan interpreted it to mean an attack at first light. The result was that Fagan was surprised to find his attack on Hindman Hill was opposed by artillery fire from Graveyard Hill, which was General Price's objective. General Fagan had expected Price to be engaged already with that battery. Fagan's artillery had not been able to reach the battlefield because of felled trees blocking the road. Fagan had no artillery available to silence the Federal guns and had no choice but to order his troops to try to take the hill while under artillery fire. Fagan's men reached the summit of the hill and managed to seize the outer fortifications but were pinned down just short of the summit by the two Union batteries. The exposed Confederates were targeted by every remaining gun on the battlefield as well as the heavy guns of the USS Tyler. By 10:30 Holmes realized that his position had deteriorated and that he could make no further headway. A general retreat was ordered, and the attack on the Union base had failed. The regiment reported 75 casualties during the Battle of Helena, including 16 Killed, 44 wounded and 15 missing.

The 22nd Arkansas subsequently served in the defense of Little Rock in September, 1863, with Fagan's Brigade. The Union advance upon Little Rock was opposed mainly by the Confederate cavalry divisions of Generals Marmaduke and Walker. The Confederate infantry brigades were dug in on the north side of the Arkansas River. According to Captain Ethan Allen Pinnell of the Eighth Missouri Infantry, "Our works extend from the Arkansas river two miles below the city. to the eastern part of Crystal Hill, a distance of 6 miles. Gen'l Fagan's Brig. is on the extreme right, Parson's on Fagan's left, Frost in the center and McRea's on the left." The Union forces established a pontoon bridge near Bayou Fourche, and crossed to the south side of the very low Arkansas River. With his works on the north side of the river now flanked, Major General Price was forced to abandon the city on September 10, after a brief engagement at Bayou Fourche. Price's Army withdrew in the direction of Rockport. Colonel Alexander T. Hawthorn took command of the brigade in the fall of 1863. The regiment spent the winter of 1863-64 in Camden, Ouachita County.

The Arkansas State Military Board was responsible for authorizing and designating regiments of volunteers. The board did a reasonably good job of sequencing the unit designations through much of the war; however the Confederate War Department at Richmond tended to designate new regiments based upon when the muster rolls were received. Another reason for dual designations was administrative. In the case of the 35th Arkansas, it is a little more convoluted. Earlier, Col. George W. King's south Arkansas regiment had been designated by the State Military Board as the 22nd Arkansas. Since the rolls for the 20th Arkansas had not yet arrived at Richmond, the War Department assumed that Arkansas had skipped that number, so G. W. King's 22nd Arkansas was designated by the Confederate War Department as the 20th Arkansas. By the time the reorganized muster rolls of Col. James P. King's 35th Arkansas arrive in Richmond, the War Department noticed that the designation 22nd Arkansas wasn't being used (due to their previous error), so J. P. King's regiment was re-designated at the 22nd Arkansas. Colonel Henry J McCord assumed command of the 35th Arkansas Infantry on December 2, 1863, the re-designation of the 35th Arkansas to the 22nd Arkansas appears to have been effective at the same time that Colonel McCord assumed command.

=== 1864 ===
The brigade was assigned to Churchill's Arkansas Division during the Red River Campaign. In the Spring of 1864, the Churchill's Division, with Hawthorn's Brigade moved south to oppose the advance of Union General Nathaniel Bank's army in north-central Louisiana in March and early April 1864, helping to defeat him at the Battle of Pleasant Hill, Louisiana, on April 10, 1864. Hawthorn's brigade was initially left behind at Camden when the rest of the army went to join General Taylor. They were eventually called upon as well, and left Camden for Louisiana on April 5. They reached Shreveport around the 14th or 15 April when they got news about the Confederate victories at Mansfield and Pleasant Hill. On the 16th, they started their march back to Arkansas with the rest of the army. Churchill's Division marched back north into Arkansas to deal with the other part of the Federal advance, General Frederick Steele's Camden Expedition. The division arrived after a long forced march at Woodlawn, Arkansas, on April 26, where they rested overnight, then joined the pursuit of Steele's retreating army, catching it trying to cross the Saline River near Jenkins' Ferry. At the Battle of Jenkins' Ferry. Colonel Cocke was killed during the Battle of Jenkins' Ferry.

On September 30, 1864, the regiment was assigned to Brigadier General Alexander T. Hawthorn's 4th (Arkansas) Brigade, Acting Major General Thomas J. Churchill's 1st (Arkansas) Division, Major General John B. Magruder's Second Army Corps, Army of the Trans-Mississippi and remained in that assignment through December 31, 1864. On 17 November 1864, a union spy reported that the Hawthorn's Brigade and Churchill's Division was in the vicinity of Camden, in Ouachita County, Arkansas. On 31 December 1864, General Kirby Smith's report on the organization of his forces lists the 35th Arkansas, under the command of Colonel Henry J. McCord as belonging to Brigadier General Alexander T. Hawthorne's, 4th Brigade of Acting Major General Thomas J. Churchill's 1st Arkansas Infantry Division of Major General John B. Magruder's 2nd Army Corps, Confederate Army of the Trans-Mississippi.

=== 1865 ===
Hawthorn's Brigade was ordered to move to Dooley's Bluff, near Washington, in Hempstead County on 19 January 1865 in order to assist with the building of fortifications along the Red River. On 22 January 1865, Major General Churchill was ordered to move his division to Minden, Louisiana, and occupy winter quarters. On 23 January 1865, Major General Churchill sent a dispatch to Colonel Hawthorn at Dooley's Ferry and directed his movement to Minden, Louisiana.

Union commanders in the Department of the Gulf reported on March 20, 1865, that General Hawthorn's brigade was composed of four regiments and was located a Minden, Louisiana, with the rest of Churchill's Division. In early April 1865, the division concentrated near Shreveport, Louisiana, and then moved to Marshall, Texas, by mid-April 1865.

This regiment surrendered with the Department of the Trans-Mississippi, General E. Kirby Smith commanding, May 26, 1865. When the Trans-Mississippi Department surrendered, all of the Arkansas infantry regiments were encamped in and around Marshall, Texas (war-ravaged Arkansas no longer able to subsist the army). The regiments were ordered to report to Shreveport, Louisiana, to be paroled but none of them did so. Company G of the 22nd Arkansas Infantry Regiment along with members of the 34th Arkansas Infantry Regiment decided that rather than march to Shreveport, Louisiana, they would to march to Fort Smith and surrendered to General Bussey at that location on June 9, 1865.

== Campaign credit ==
The 35th/22nd Arkansas Infantry was involved in the following engagements :

- Battle of Prairie Grove, Arkansas, December 7, 1862.
- Battle of Helena, Arkansas, July 4, 1863.
- Battle of Little Rock, Arkansas, September 10, 1863.
- Red River campaign, Louisiana-Arkansas, March–May, 1864.
  - Camden Expedition, Arkansas March–May, 1864.
    - Battle of Jenkins' Ferry, Arkansas, April 30, 1864.

== Regimental color ==
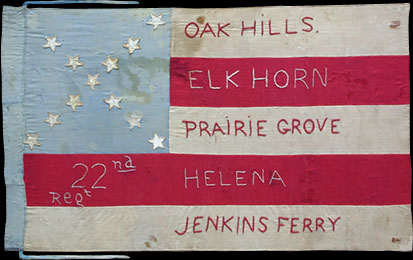
Regimental color of the 22nd Arkansas at the Old State House Museum in Little Rock, Arkansas.

A flag attributed to the 22nd Arkansas is in the collection of the Old State House Museum Collection in Little Rock Arkansas. The flag is made of wool and cotton flag with a field of five red and white horizontal bars of varying widths. Canton is light blue 11 1/2" on the staff by 11 1/2" on the fly. There are 13 5-pointed stars that are white with gold edges each 1 1/2. Set in an "X" shape. Unit designation is embroidered in white chain stitch Roman uncial and minuscule figure and letters: 22nd Regt. Battle honors are embroidered in contrasting red or white block letters on the red and white bars: OAK HILLS, ELK HORN, PRAIRIE GROVE, HELENA, JENKINS FERRY. Museum curators believe that the flag was actually carried by the 22nd Arkansas during the war up until the unit surrender on June 9, 1865. The flag is believed to have been returned to the State of Arkansas in 1905 by the U.S. War Department. Other historians believe that the flag may be a post war flag created by the veterans of the unit for use during a Reunion.

== See also ==
- List of Confederate units from Arkansas

== Bibliography ==
- Banasik, Michael E. Embattled Arkansas: The Prairie Grove Campaign of 1862. Wilmington, NC: Broadfoot Publishing Company, 1996.
- Baxter, William. Pea Ridge and Prairie Grove: Scenes and Incidents of the War in Arkansas. Fayetteville: University of Arkansas Press, 2000.
- Bears, Edwin C. “The Battle of Helena, July 4, 1863.” Arkansas Historical Quarterly 20 (Autumn 1961): 256–297.
- Christ, Mark K. Civil War Arkansas, 1863: The Battle for a State. Norman: University of Oklahoma Press, 2010.
- Christ, Mark K., ed. Rugged and Sublime: The Civil War in Arkansas. Fayetteville: University of Arkansas Press, 1994.
- Christ, Mark K. “‘We Were Badly Whipped’: A Confederate Account of the Battle of Helena, July 4, 1863.” Arkansas Historical Quarterly 69 (Spring 2010): 44–53.
- DeBlack, Thomas A. With Fire and Sword: Arkansas, 1861–1874. Fayetteville: University of Arkansas Press, 2003.
- Hess. Earl J.; Shea, William L.; Piston, William G.; Hatcher, Richard W.: Wilson's Creek, Pea Ridge, and Prairie Grove: A Battlefield Guide, with a Section on Wire Road, Lincoln, Nebraska, U.S.A. Bison Books 2006, ISBN 978-0-8032-7366-5
- Montgomery, Don, ed. The Battle of Prairie Grove. Prairie Grove, AR: Prairie Grove Battlefield Historic State Park, 1996.
- Sallee, Scott E. “The Battle of Prairie Grove: War in the Ozarks, April ’62–January ’63.” Blue & Gray Magazine 21 (Fall 2004): 6–23, 45–50.
- Schieffler, George David. “Too Little, Too Late to Save Vicksburg: The Battle of Helena, Arkansas, July 4, 1863.” MA thesis, University of Arkansas, 2005
- Shea, William L. War in the West: Pea Ridge and Prairie Grove. Abilene, TX: McWhiney Foundation Press, 2001.
- Shea, William L. Fields of Blood: The Prairie Grove Campaign. Chapel Hill: University of North Carolina Press, 2009. ISBN 978-0-8078-3315-5
