= Benjamin T. DuVal =

American state legislator in Arkansas (1822-1905)

Benjamin T. DuVal (1822-1905) was an American state legislator in Arkansas. He served in the Arkansas House of Representatives from 1858-1861 and 1895-1896.

DuVal was the eldest of William DuVal's (1786-1851) six children. His father was a pioneer resident of Fort Smith, Arkansas who arrived with his family in 1822 and established a trading business.

During the American Civil War he served on James Fleming Fagan's staff.
