= 37th Arkansas Infantry Regiment =

Infantry regiment of the Confederate States Army

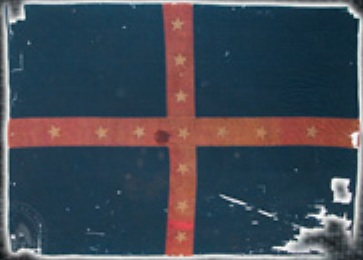
- Regimental color of the 37th Arkansas at the State Historical Society in Des Moines, Iowa
- Active: 1862–1865
- Disbanded: May 26, 1865
- Country: Confederate States
- Allegiance: Arkansas
- Branch: Army
- Type: Regiment
- Role: Infantry
- Facings: Light blue
- Battles: American Civil War; Battle of Prairie Grove; Battle of Helena; Battle of Mansfield; Battle of Pleasant Hill; Battle of Jenkins' Ferry

The 37th Arkansas Infantry Regiment or the 1st Trans-Mississippi Rifle Regiment (also known as "Pleasants' regiment" and "Bell's regiment") was an infantry formation of the Confederate States Army in the Trans-Mississippi Theater of the American Civil War. It was successively commanded by Colonels Joseph C. Pleasants and Samuel S. Bell.

== Formation ==
The 37th Arkansas Infantry Regiment was organized in Pope County by individual companies during March through June 1862 and organized as the 29th Arkansas Infantry Regiment upon its acceptance into Confederate service on June 6, 1862, under the command of Colonel Joseph C. Pleasants. The unit was also at one time designated as the 1st Trans-Mississippi Infantry Regiment. The unit's Field Officers were Lieutenant Colonel Jeptha C. Johnson and Major John A. Geoghegan. It was renamed as the 37th Arkansas Infantry regiment following the Battle of Prairie Grove. The unit was composed of volunteer companies from the following counties:

- Company A, Commanded by Captain William J. Donaldson, organized at Hamburg, Arkansas, on March 15, 1862.
- Company B, Commanded by Captain George W. Hurley, organized in Searcy, Arkansas, on March 29, 1862.
- Company C, Commanded by Captain J. J. Hall, organized at Augusta, Arkansas, on April 30, 1862.
- Company D, Commanded by Captain John N. Bradley, organized at Hillsboro, Arkansas, on April 26, 1862.
- Company E, Commanded by Captain Joe P. Vann, organized at Princeton, Arkansas, on May 8, 1862.
- Company F, Commanded by Captain William J. Smith, organized in Clark County, Arkansas, on May 7, 1862.
- Company G, Commanded by Captain William H. Bell, organized in Hamburg, Arkansas, on May 10, 1862.
- Company H, Commanded by Captain James L. Weatherspoon, organized at Arkadelphia, Arkansas, on May 15, 1862.
- Company I, Commanded by Captain W. R. Basden, organized at Sulphur Springs, Arkansas, on May 20, 1862.
- Company K, Commanded by Captain William Goodrum, organized at Camp Hindman, Arkansas, on June 7, 1862.

Maj John A. Geoghagan was assigned as Lieutenant Colonel and Captain Sam S. Bell was assigned as Major, with date of rank June 17, 1862.

Captain J.B. Dugger was appointed as the Assistant Quarter Master of the regiment. Lieutenant Lieut C.H. Rundell was appointed as the Adjutant of the regiment.

== History ==
On November 15, 1862, General Hindman moved the Arkansas infantry to Massard Prairie, three miles southeast of Fort Smith to drill and organize divisions. The 37th Arkansas was assigned to Brigadier General James F. Fagan's 1st Brigade of Brigadier General Francis A. Shoup's 2nd Division, of Major General Thomas Carmichael Hindman's 1st Corps of Lieutenant General Theophilus Holmes's Army of the Trans-Mississippi. The unit was brigaded with the 34th Arkansas Infantry Regiment commanded by Colonel William H. Brooks, the 35th Arkansas Infantry Regiment, commanded by Colonel James P. King, the 39th Arkansas Infantry Regiment, commanded by Colonel Alexander T. Hawthorn and Chew's Arkansas Infantry Battalion, commanded by Major Robert E. Chew.

At the very end of November the cavalry was sent north toward Washington County. Early in December the infantry followed heading north. The brigade crossed the Arkansas River on December 2, 1862. On December 4, the column reached Oliver's Store on Lee creek in the Boston Mountains. Their battle flags were presented to the regiments of the division.

On December 6, 1862, Fagan's brigade arrived at Morrow's and controlled all the approaches to Cane Hill from the south and east. Hindman then learned of the approach of General Herron, who had two divisions just north of Fayetteville. Hindman planned to get behind the Federal division of General Blunt and prevent General Herron's division from combining with Gen. Blunt. Upon reaching the high ground at Prairie Grove on December 7, Hindman's army formed on the ridge overlooking Crawford Prairie and Fagan's brigade was advanced to a position fifty yards from the Borden Orchard. The position was very good and there the army waited for Herron to advance. Brook's regiment was posted behind an artillery battery. Around 2:00 pm the artillery duel started. Blocher's Battery, which was part of Fagan's brigade became a lightning rod for Federal artillery and later infantry. The 20th Wisconsin advanced to take the battery and when their right flank was 50 yards away from their position, Brook's 34th Arkansas rose and fired into them. The regiment was ordered forward along with Chew's Arkansas Infantry Battalion and Hawthorne's regiment. The 20th Wisconsin was driven back and the battery was retaken. As the Confederate counterattack came off the ridge and onto the prairie they came under heavy fire and retreated to their position in the ravine. As the Confederates were reorganizing another Federal attack was launched. This time the 37th Illinois advanced to the summit. Again the Fagan's brigade rose out of the scrub and fired a point blank volley and charged. The two forces locked in hand-to-hand fighting. Again the Confederates followed the retreating Federals and ran into heavy fire. As the brigade resumed their position on the summit, the tempo of the battle slowed and shifted to another part of the battlefield. They stayed in position until nearly midnight when the order to retreat came. During the march over the Boston Mountains many of the men deserted to their homes. The casualties of the 29th Arkansas included the regiment's colonel, major, color-bearer, half of the first sergeants, and a third of the company commanders. Only one man deserted the field during the battle. Colonel John C. Pleasent [sic?] died as a results of wounds in the Battle of Prairie Grove and he was succeeded by Colonel Samuel S. Bell.

=== Redesignation as the 37th Arkansas ===
During the general re-organization of the 1st Corps of the Army of the Trans-Mississippi, following the Battle of Prairie Grove, new muster rolls for several of the regiments were sent to the Confederate War Department in Richmond, which assumed that the rolls were for new regiments, and thus assigned new numerical designations, thus the 29th Arkansas Infantry became redesignated as the 37th Arkansas Infantry Regiment. After the retreat from Prairie Grove to Van Buren, Fagan's brigade spent the winter of 1863–64 in camp near Little Rock, remaining there until June when the unit began the movements that would lead to the Battle of Helena.

=== Helena ===
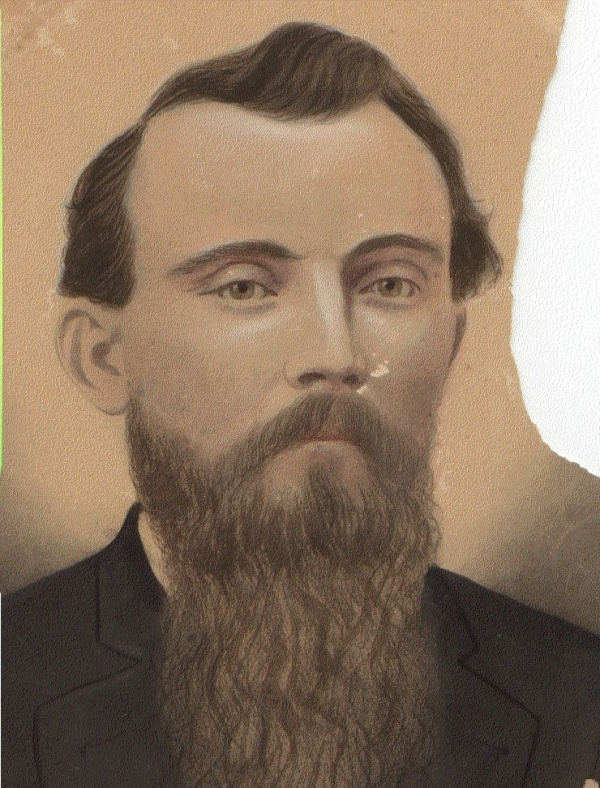
Colonel Samuel S. Bell, captured at Helena in 1863.

On July 4, 1863, the 37th Arkansas served in the attack on the federal post at Helena, Arkansas. Fagan's Brigade was assigned to Major General Sterling Price's Division of Lieutenant General Theophilus H. Holmes's army during the attack on Union forces at Helena Arkansas on July 4, 1863. General Fagan's 1,300 men were assigned to capture Hindman's Hill southwest of the city. Generals Fagan and Price failed to coordinate their attacks due to General Holmes' vague order to "attack at daylight." Price interpreted this order to mean an attack at sunrise and Fagan interpreted it to mean an attack at first light. The result was that Fagan was surprised to find his attack on Hindman Hill was opposed by artillery fire from Graveyard Hill, which was General Price's objective. General Fagan had expected Price to be engaged already with that battery. Fagan's artillery had not been able to reach the battlefield because of felled trees blocking the road. Fagan had no artillery available to silence the Federal guns and had no choice but to order his troops to try to take the hill while under artillery fire. Fagan's men reached the summit of the hill and managed to seize the outer fortifications but were pinned down just short of the summit by the two Union batteries. The exposed Confederates were targeted by every remaining gun on the battlefield as well as the heavy guns of the USS Tyler.

By 10:30 General Holmes realized that his position had deteriorated and that he could make no further headway. A general retreat was ordered, and the attack on the Union base had failed. During this stage of the battle, a significant part of the 37th Arkansas was captured. Detachments of the 43rd Indiana, 33rd Iowa and 33rd Missouri all seem to have been involved in the capture of the forward elements of the 37th Arkansas. Here is what Lieutenant-Colonel William H. Heath, commanding 33rd Missouri, reported:

About 9 a.m. a second attack was made upon Battery D by Fagan's brigade of Arkansas troops, three regiments strong, and said by prisoners to have acted under the personal direction of Lieutenant-General Holmes. The battery was bravely supported by detachments from the Forty.third Indiana, under Major Norris, and the Thirty-third Iowa, under Major Gibson. In spite, however, of the most determined resistance, Bell's regiment, with small portions of Hawthorn's and Brooks', succeeded in penetrating our outer line of rifle-pits, and securing a position in a deep ravine to the left of the battery and below the range of its guns. The remainder of the brigade was broken and scattered by the terrific fire of our artillery in the works, and compelled to seek shelter in the woods out of range. Immediately upon their retreating, our riflemen from all three regiments in the pits closed in upon those of the enemy who were in the ravine, from all sides cutting off retreat. The reserve of the Forty-third Indiana formed across the mouth of the ravine, and two Parrott guns of the First Missouri Battery, under Lieutenant O'Connell, were also brought to rake the enemy's position. Capt. John G. Hudson, of the Thirty-third Missouri, commanding Battery D, then demanded the surrender of the entire force. The men at once threw down their arms, and Lieutenant-Colonel Johnson, of Bell's regiment, made a formal surrender of his command, mustering 21 officers and between 300 and 400 men, with all their arms and one stand of colors. At about 10.30 a.m. the main body of the enemy had entirely drawn off from in front of our batteries and the firing ceased.

Lieutenant-Colonel Cyrus H. Mackey, commanding 33rd Iowa, reported:

At 8 a.m. they charged Batteries D and C, bringing forward Generals Fagan's and Parsons' brigades. They succeeded in carrying Battery C, but not until they had many of their men and officers killed and wounded; but their superiority in numbers was so great that they completely overpowered our force at the battery. The three companies from my own regiment and two from the Thirty-third Missouri constituted the entire force at this battery. The men retired from the battery in the direction of Fort Curtis, about 250 yards. By this time we had completely routed the enemy in front of Battery D. They succeeded here only sufficiently to get possession of the extreme left of the rifle-pits. Our force at this battery consisted of six companies of my own regiment, six of the Thirty-third Missouri, and two of the Forty-third Indiana. I now withdrew Companies I and K, and formed a new line with them, and Companies A, F, D, and C, to the rear of Battery C 250 yards, which succeeded completely in stopping any further progress of the enemy. Finding themselves repulsed at all points, they commenced to fall back to the timber. Things at this battery remained in this condition for some time. Many of them, instead of falling back to the timber, took refuge in the woods around the battery, and kept up a desultory fire therefrom. Finding that the enemy was not going to attempt anything more in this direction, I withdrew the two companies I had brought here, and returned to the Little Rock road, in front of Battery D; arriving there I ordered the whole force to charge forward on this road. The entire force advanced with a will that carried everything before them, and in ten minutes I had complete possession of the entire battle-ground on this road and obtained several hundred prisoners and two stand of colors.

Col. Samuel A. Rice, 33rd Iowa, commanding the brigade to which these regiments belonged, didn't credit any specific regiment with the capture of the 37th Arkansas, but the captured colors were credited to his own regiment. The regiment sustained 50 percent casualties, including the colonel, lieutenant-colonel, adjutant, color-bearer, and seven of the ten company commanders. The regiment reported 222 losses during the Battle of Helena, including 14 Killed, 17 wounded and 191 missing. Most of the men of the 37th Arkansas captured at Helena were sent to military prison at Alton, Illinois, and later sent to Fort Delaware, where they were held until March 1865, when they were forwarded to City Point, Virginia, for exchange. The Officers were sent to military prison Johnson's Island, near Sandusky, Ohio. A large number of the men who were captured died in captivity.

=== Little Rock ===
The 37th Arkansas, now under the command of Maj Thomas H. Blacknall, due to Colonel Bell's capture at the Battle of Helena, subsequently served in the defense of Little Rock in September, 1863, with Fagan's Brigade. The Union advance upon Little Rock was opposed mainly by the Confederate cavalry divisions of Generals Marmaduke and Walker. The Confederate infantry brigades were dug in on the north side of the Arkansas River. According to Captain Ethan Allen Pinnell of the Eighth Missouri Infantry, "Our works extend from the [Arkansas] river two miles below the city. to the eastern part of Crystal Hill, a distance of 6 miles. Gen'l Fagan's Brig. is on the extreme right, Parson's on Fagan's left, Frost in the center and McRea's on the left." The Union forces established a pontoon bridge near Bayou Fourche, and crossed to the south side of the very low Arkansas River. With his works on the north side of the river now flanked, Major General Price was forced to abandon the city on September 10, after a brief engagement at Bayou Fourche. Price's Army withdrew in the direction of Rockport.

=== Red River ===
The Fagan's brigade, now under the command of Brigadier General A. T. Hawthorn, spent the winter of 1863 southwest of Little Rock and then was sent south with General Churchill's Arkansas Infantry Division to Shreveport, Louisiana, in the early spring of 1864 to assist General Kirby Smith's army in countering Union General Nathaniel Banks' advance along the Red River. Churchill's Division, helped defeat Banks at the Battle of Pleasant Hill, Louisiana, on April 10, 1864. Hawthorn's brigade was initially left behind at Camden when the rest of the army went to join General Taylor. They were eventually called upon as well, and left Camden for Louisiana on April 5. They reached Shreveport around the 14th or 15 April when they got news about the Confederate victories at Mansfield and Pleasant Hill. On the 16th, they started their march back to Arkansas with the rest of the army. Churchill's Division and Kirby Smith then marched back to Arkansas to assist General Price in dealing with the other half of the Red River campaign, Union General Frederick Steele's Camden Expedition moving southwest from Little Rock. The Division and Hawthorn's Brigade arrived in time to join the pursuit of Steele's army as it retreated from Camden, and join in the attack on Steele as he tried to cross the Saline River at Jenkins' Ferry on April 30, 1864. Hawthorn's Brigade returned to the vicinity of Camden following Jenkins' Ferry.

=== Service until the end ===
On September 30, 1864, the regiment was assigned to Brigadier General Alexander T. Hawthorn's 4th (Arkansas) Brigade, Acting Major General Thomas J. Churchill's 1st (Arkansas) Division, Major General John B. Magruder's Second Army Corps, Army of the Trans-Mississippi and remained in that assignment through December 31, 1864. On 17 November 1864, a union spy reported that the Hawthorn's Brigade and Churhill's Division was in the vicinity of Camden, in Ouachita County, Arkansas. On 31 December 1864, General Kirby Smith's report on the organization of his forces lists the 37th Arkansas, under the command of Colonel Samuel S. Bell, as belonging to Brigadier General Alexander T. Hawthorne's, 4th Brigade of Acting Major General Thomas J. Churchill's 1st Arkansas Infantry Division of Major General John B. Magruder's 2nd Army Corps, Confederate Army of the Trans-Mississippi.

Hawthorn's Brigade was ordered to move to Dooley's Bluff, near Washington, in Hempstead County on 19 January 1865 in order to assist with the building of fortifications along the Red River. On 22 January 1865, Major General Churchill was ordered to move his division to Minden, Louisiana, and occupy winter quarters. On 23 January 1865, Major General Churchill sent a dispatch to Colonel Hawthorn at Dooley's Ferry and directed his movement to Minden, Louisiana.

Union commanders in the Department of the Gulf reported on March 20, 1865, that General Hawthorn's brigade was composed of four regiments and was located a Minden, Louisiana, with the rest of Churchill's Division. In early April 1865, the division concentrated near Shreveport, Louisiana, and then moved to Marshall, Texas, by mid April 1865.

=== Surrender ===
This regiment was surrendered by the Trans-Mississippi Department, General E. Kirby Smith commanding, on May 26, 1865. With few exceptions, the Arkansas Infantry regiments in the Trans-Mississippi simply disbanded without formally surrendering. When the Trans-Mississippi Department surrendered, all of the Arkansas infantry regiments were encamped in and around Marshall, Texas (war-ravaged Arkansas no longer able to subsist the army). The regiments were ordered to report to Shreveport, Louisiana, to be paroled but none of them did so. Some individual soldiers went to Shreveport on their own to be paroled, others reported to Union garrisons at Fort Smith, Pine Bluff or Little Rock to receive their paroles, but for the most part, the men simply went home.

== Battles ==
The regiment is credited with participation in the following battles:

- Battle of Prairie Grove, Arkansas, December 7, 1862
- Battle of Helena, Arkansas July 4, 1863
- Battle of Little Rock, Arkansas, September 10, 1863
- Battle of Jenkins Ferry, Arkansas, April 30, 1864

== Regimental colors ==
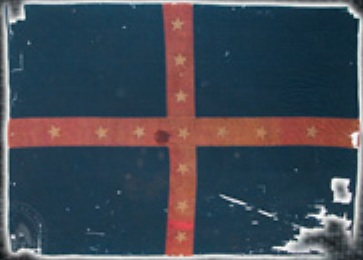
Regimental color captured at Helena, Arkansas, on July 4, 1863.

There are two flags associated with the 37th Arkansas which were captured at the Battle of Helena on July 4, 1863, by the 33rd Iowa Infantry Regiment. The first is a Trans-Mississippi pattern flag which is often described as a variant of the Polk pattern battle flag. The flag is very similar to the flag of Dobbin's 1st Arkansas Cavalry Regiment. This flag is currently in the collection of the Iowa State Historical Society.

The second flag of the 37th Arkansas, also captured by the 33rd Iowa at Helena is a 1st National Flag pattern battle flag with the inscription "IN GOD WE TRUST" printed on the white stripe in the center. The flag is large at 50 inches by 84 inches. The stars on this flag are eight pointed stars rather than the normal five pointed stars. There are twelve stars on the flag in recognition of the secession of the state of Missouri, which is unusual for a 1st National pattern flag. One of the stars on the flag bears the inscription "CAPT FLAG/4th July/Confederate A_______ or ____/________" which is presumed to refer to the Battle of Helena.

== See also ==
- List of Confederate units from Arkansas
