= John B. Cocke =

Confederate States Army officer (c. 1833–1864)

- Born: John Benjamin Cocke c. 1833; Madison County, Alabama, U.S.
- Died: April 30, 1864 (aged 30–31); Hot Spring County, Arkansas, C.S.
- Cause of death: Killed in action
- Occupations: Lawyer; army officer
- Spouse: Mahalia S. Murrah (m. 1861)
- Military career
- Allegiance: Confederate States
- Branch: Confederate States Army
- Service years: 1861–1864
- Rank: Colonel
- Commands: 39th Arkansas Infantry Regiment
- Battles: American Civil War; Battle of Shiloh; First Battle of Corinth; Battle of Prairie Grove; Battle of Helena (WIA); Battle of Mansfield; Battle of Pleasant Hill; Battle of Jenkins' Ferry †

John Benjamin Cocke (c. 1833 – April 30, 1864) was an American lawyer from eastern Arkansas. A senior officer of the Confederate States Army in the Trans-Mississippi Theater of the American Civil War, Cocke commanded the 39th Arkansas Infantry Regiment from 1863 until he was killed in action at the battle of Jenkins' Ferry in 1864.

== Biography ==
Cocke was born about 1833 in Madison County, Alabama, to Jester and Eliza (née Atkins) Cocke. Removing to Monroe County, Arkansas, before the American Civil War; he commenced the practice of law at Clarendon, the county seat. He was married to Mahalia S. Murrah on November 7, 1861, in Limestone County, Alabama. Cocke was commissioned a second lieutenant in Company A (also known as the "Harris Guards") of the 15th Arkansas Infantry Regiment, on April 30, 1861; later attaining the rank of colonel in the 39th Arkansas Infantry Regiment, and was in some of the most important battles of the Trans-Mississippi Theater. He was at Prairie Grove, Helena (where he was wounded), Mansfield, and Pleasant Hill. Cocke was killed on April 30, 1864, at the battle of Jenkins' Ferry in Arkansas. His burial location is unknown.

== Notes ==
Military offices
| Preceded by Colonel Alexander T. Hawthorn | Commanding officer of the 39th Arkansas Infantry Regiment; 1864 | Succeeded by Lieutenant Colonel Cadwallader Polk acting |
