= 39th Arkansas Infantry Regiment =

Infantry regiment of the Confederate States Army

- Active: 1862–1865
- Disbanded: May 26, 1865
- Country: Confederate States
- Allegiance: Arkansas
- Branch: Army
- Type: Infantry
- Size: Regiment
- Facings: Light blue
- Battles: American Civil War; Battle of Prairie Grove; Battle of Helena; Battle of Mansfield; Battle of Pleasant Hill; Battle of Jenkins' Ferry

Commanders
- Commanding officers: Col. Albert W. Johnson; Col. Alexander T. Hawthorn; Col. John B. Cocke †; Lieut. Col. Cadwallader Polk (acting)

The 39th Arkansas Infantry Regiment or the 6th Trans-Mississippi Rifle Regiment (also known as "Johnson's regiment," "Hawthorn's regiment," "Cocke's regiment," and "Polk's regiment") was an infantry formation of the Confederate States Army in the Trans-Mississippi Theater of the American Civil War. It was successively commanded by Colonels Albert W. Johnson, Alexander T. Hawthorn, John B. Cocke, and Lieutenant-Colonel Cadwallader Polk.

The regiment was mustered into service on June 17, 1862, at Trenton, Arkansas, remaining active through May 26, 1865. When Major-General Thomas C. Hindman began authorizing the creation of new infantry regiments within the Trans-Mississippi Department in the summer of 1862, he initially designated them as "Trans-Mississippi Rifle Regiments", and the new regiment being formed by Albert W. Johnson was designated as the 6th Trans-Mississippi Rifle Regiment.

Another state regiment was also designated 39th Arkansas Infantry; that being successively commanded by Colonels Hart, McNeill, and Rogan. It was originally designated as the 39th Arkansas Infantry Regiment, but later redesignated as the 30th. The regiment served in the Trans-Mississippi Theater and participated in all of the principal engagements in the Trans-Mississippi Department before being disbanded on May 26, 1865.

== Formation ==
The 39th Arkansas Infantry Regiment was organized in 1862 at Trenton, Arkansas. Hindman assumed command of the Trans-Mississippi Department on May 30, 1862, and immediately began attempting to organize the Confederate forces in Arkansas. On June 15, 1862, Colonel Robert C. Newton, Hindman's Adjutant-General, wrote to Colonel Albert W. Johnson who was attempting to raise a regiment in Phillips County, Arkansas:

The order assigning Maj. Polk to you was made upon the information that you wished it. As far as practicable, the preferences of officers raising troops will be consulted in such matters. Your action requiring the conscripts to rendezvous at Trenton is approved. Use your discretion in similar cases. To expedite our operations against the enemy, an order has been made, dividing the country east of White River with three districts, a copy of which is enclosed. It is believed taking the State records as the cases of the calculation, that each district contains persons within the ages of conscription sufficient to form a Regiment. You are hereby authorized to retain command of Capt. Anderson's Co. as part of the Regiment you are raising. It is quite probable the Federals will put a force at Helena – In that event, your opportunities for successfully attacking them will be very favorable. Do so, at all times, by day and night, when you possibly can – Gun boats will be useless in the night. Transports will afford a fire wand. There may possibly be an iron gun or two in Phillips – such pieces might be mounted and used to advantage, allow no threats of shelling or burning Helena, or doing any other injury to prevent you from striking the enemy whenever you can.

In mid-July 1862, several companies, including a small battalion under Captain Daniel H. Ringo, were added to Colonel Johnson's regiment. Ringo was appointed Lieutenant-Colonel of the Regiment on July 19, 1862. By August 12, 1862, the new regiment was at Crystal Hill, north of Little Rock. Johnson received his official appointment as Colonel on August 15, with date of rank from June 8, 1862. In September and October, the regiment camped at Austin, Arkansas, and Des Arc. Johnson resigned on October 27 in order to report to Major-General John C. Breckinridge, East of the Mississippi River. Lieutenant-Colonel Ringo resigned the following day. In accepting their resignations, Hindman noted that the two men were not in good standing with the officers of the regiment. On November 3, 1862, Hindman issued Special Order Number 30:

Upon the recommendation of the Company officers of Johnson's regiment of Ark inf, the following persons are assigned to duty as the Field Officers of that Regiment, subject to confirmation by the War Dept:

A. T. Hawthorn, to be Colonel, in the place of Colonel Johnson, resigned.
Maj. C. Polk to be Lt Colonel in the place of Lt Colonel Ringo, resigned.
Lt. J. B. Cocke to be Major in the place of Maj. C. Polk, promoted to Lt Colonel

All to make rank from this date. The Regiment will hereafter be known as "Hawthorn's Regiment of Ark inf."

The regiment consisted of the following companies:

- Company A – commanded by Captain John B. Torbett, organized at Rockport, in Hot Spring County, on June 9, 1862;
- Company B – original commander is unknown but the company was organized in Phillips County;
- Company C – commanded by Captain J. W. Scaife, consisting of men from Monroe County, enlisted June 12, 1862;
- Company D – commanded by Captain Walton Watkins, organized at Benton, in Saline County, June 17, 1862;
- Company E – commanded by Captain W. J. F. Jones, organized in Monroe County, on June 17, 1862;
- Company F – commanded by Captain J. H. Boring, organized in Perry County, on August 1, 1862;
- Company G – commanded by Captain Felix Strayhorn, organized in Yell County;
- Company H – commanded by Captain Pleasant G. Roper, organized at Trenton, in Phillips County, on June 4, 1862;
- Company I – commanded by Captain George Washington, organized in Hot Spring County;
- Company K – commanded by Captain George Harrod, organized at Danville, in Yell County, on July 21, 1862;
- Company L – commanded by Captain Joel C. Anderson, organized in Green County, on July 1, 1862.

The regiment served in McRae's, Fagan's, and Hawthorn's brigades, Trans-Mississippi Department. The field officers were Colonels Albert W. Johnson, Alexander T. Hawthorn, John B. Cocke, Cadwallader Polk, and Lieutenant-Colonel D. W. Ringo.

=== Confusion over naming ===
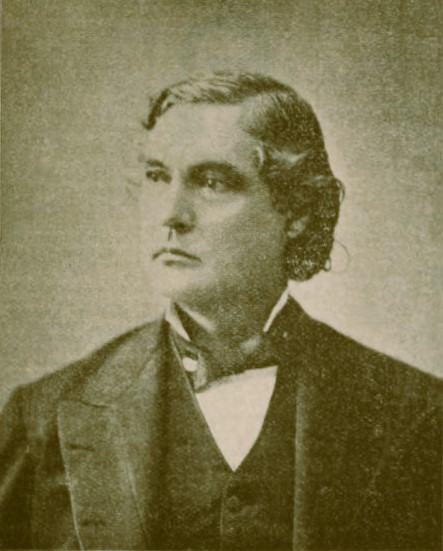
Alexander T. Hawthorn, a veteran of the battles of Shiloh and Perryville, commanded the regiment at Prairie Grove, and Helena.

The regiment's designation has caused problems for historians attempting to research the unit. Although Colonel John B. Cocke commanded "Cocke's Regiment" for only three months, and the historically accurate designation should be "39th (Johnson's-Hawthorn's-Cocke's) Infantry Regiment or the 6th Trans-Mississippi Rifle Regiment, and Hailey's, Perkins' and Tumlinson's independent cavalry companies, historians have adopted "Cocke's Arkansas Regiment."" This is because the U.S. government used the name to catalog the service records of the men who served in the regiment. In the early 1900s, an army of U.S. War Department clerks pored over hundreds of thousands of Confederate army records, muster rolls, payrolls, quartermaster and commissary receipts, prisoner of war records, etc., and painstakingly extracted individual information from them to create a Compiled Service Record for each Confederate soldier. This monumental task is one of the most valuable services the federal government performed for researchers. However, the clerks misread many names and also worked with sometimes confusing records, cataloguing everything about this unit under "Cocke's Regiment".

The regiment is officially referred to by the U.S. National Archives and Records Administration as "Cocke's Arkansas Infantry Regiment," even though John B. Cocke was the last known colonel of the regiment, serving from January 1864 until April, when he was killed at the Battle of Jenkins' Ferry. He was preceded in command by Albert W. Johnson, and Alexander T. Hawthorn. Cadwallader Polk assumed command upon Cocke's death, but there is no surviving record to show he was promoted to colonel. The Trans-Mississippi Department frequently used the name of the regimental commander in its official correspondence, especially for Arkansas regiments. The order of battle for the Battle of Helena lists a "39th Arkansas Infantry Regiment" in McRae's brigade, but this was actually Hart's 30th Arkansas Regiment, which was known for a short time as the 39th Arkansas. Hart's regiment was with McRae, and the real 39th Regiment was in Brig. Gen. Fagan's brigade and is referred to in the battle reports as "Hawthorn's Regiment".

The Arkansas State Military Board was responsible for authorizing, raising and designating Arkansas regiments, in response to requests from the Confederate States War Department for new units. The board took a sheet of lined paper, numbering the lines from 1 to 48, and applied the next available number to each new regiment. Unfortunately, the Confederate States War Department, the Trans-Mississippi Department, the brigade commanders, and even the regimental commanders often used designations different from the State Military Board's.

The State Military Board designated the regiment as "Cocke's Regiment" as 39th in its ledger book. Hindman originally decided to designate all of the Arkansas infantry regiments raised in the District of Arkansas during the summer of 1862 as "Trans-Mississippi Rifle Regiments." Cocke's Regiment was designated as the 6th Trans-Mississippi Rifle Regiment; and, the officers and men of Cocke's Regiment quickly began referring to the regiment as the 6th Arkansas. This redesignation causes more confusion because this designation had already been given to Lyon's-Hawthorn's-Smith's elite 6th Arkansas Infantry Regiment in the Army of Tennessee, on the east side of the Mississippi River. This incorrect association with the other 6th Arkansas Infantry is further reinforced by the fact that Alexander T. Hawthorn commanded the original "6th Arkansas Infantry Regiment" for a time, and later commanded the "other" 6th Arkansas, the 6th Trans-Mississippi (39th Arkansas Infantry Regiment).

== History ==
=== Prairie Grove ===
On November 15, 1862, Hindman moved the Arkansas infantry regiments to Massard Prairie, three miles southeast of Fort Smith to drill and organize divisions. Hawthorn's regiment was assigned to the First Brigade, Second Division of the First Corps, Army of the Trans-Mississippi. The unit was brigaded with the 34th Arkansas commanded by Colonel William H. Brooks, the 35th Arkansas, commanded by Colonel James P. King, the 37th Arkansas, commanded by Colonel Joseph C. Pleasants and Chew's Sharpshooter Battalion, commanded by Major Robert E. Chew .

At the very end of November the cavalry was sent north toward Washington County. Early in December the infantry followed heading north. The brigade crossed the Arkansas River on December 2, 1862. On December 4, the column reached Oliver's Store on Lee creek in the Boston Mountains. There battle flags were presented to the regiments of the division.

On December 6, 1862 Fagan's brigade arrived at Morrow's and controlled the approaches to Cane Hill from the south and east. Hindman then learned of the approach of General Herron, who had two divisions just north of Fayetteville. Hindman planned to get behind the Federal division of General Blunt and prevent General Herron's division from combining with Gen. Blunt. Upon reaching the high ground at Prairie Grove on December 7, Hindman's army formed on the ridge overlooking Crawford Prairie and Fagan's brigade was advanced to a position fifty yards from the Borden Orchard. The position was very good and there the army waited for Herron to advance. Brook's regiment was posted behind an artillery battery. Around 2:00 pm the artillery duel started. Blocher's Battery, which was part of Fagan's brigade became a lightning rod for Federal artillery and later infantry. The 20th Wisconsin advanced to take the battery and when their right flank was 50 yards away from their position, Brook's 34th Arkansas rose and fired into them. The regiment was ordered forward along with Chew's battalion and Hawthorne's regiment. The 20th Wisconsin was driven back and the battery was retaken. As the Confederate counterattack came off the ridge and onto the prairie they came under heavy fire and retreated to their position in the ravine. As the Confederates were reorganizing another Federal attack was launched. This time the 37th Illinois advanced to the summit. Again the Fagan's brigade rose out of the scrub and fired a point blank volley and charged. The two forces locked in hand-to-hand fighting. Again the Confederates followed the retreating Federals and ran into heavy fire. As the brigade resumed their position on the summit, the tempo of the battle slowed and shifted to another part of the battlefield. They stayed in position until nearly midnight when the order to retreat came. During the march over the Boston Mountains many of the men deserted to their homes.

On December 1, 1862, Brig. Gen. James F. Fagan asked for the consolidation of Hawthorn's regiment and Chew's battalion, both of his brigade. While this order was not approved until after the Battle of Prairie Grove, the battalion and Hawthorn's regiment fought side by side during the battle. They took part in the charges of Fagan's brigade driving back the 20th Wisconsin, 19th Iowa, and 37th Illinois and 26th Indiana regiments when these Union troops ascended the ridge.

Camp near Van Buren, Ark.

December 13, 1862

On the 7th inst. this army, under the command of Major-General Hindman, fought the battle of "Prairie Grove" fifty miles north of this. It was a most terrific fight, lasting from 12 o'clock until dark. I take it for granted that you would like to hear the particulars of the battle, and of the part which my regiment took in it. I will endeavor to describe it.

We left Van Buren on the morning of the 3rd, and encamped on the night of the 6th within eight miles of the enemy. Boston Mountain lay between us, and here the roads forked, one crossing the mountain and leading direct to Cane Hill, the other sweeping round to the right and rear of Cane Hill, and crossing the mountain at a point where the difficulties were not so great. Gen. Hindman made a most splendid and masterly movement. He threw forward a heavy force of cavalry on the road towards Cane Hill and made such demonstrations as induced the enemy to believe that he was moving in heavy force upon them in that direction, while in reality he was rushing with his whole infantry and artillery to the right and rear of the enemy, and by sunrise we were completely in rear of Cane Hill, fronting the main body, under Gen. Heron, having completely cut the enemy's lines and divided his army into two parts; one part at Cane Hill, commanded by Gen. Blount, the other at Ray's mill, about five miles distant, under Gen. Heron. The result of this brilliant maneuvre was the capture of four hundred of the enemy's cavalry, thirty-two wagons and teams, a large amount of quartermaster and commissary stores, &c. So far the maneuvre was brilliant and resembled one of Napoleon's lightning-like strokes. But we did not pursue our advantage with sufficient rapidity. We ought to have thrown our whole force upon one part and destroyed it, before the other could come to its relief; instead of which, we halted, fronted to all points of the compass, in the form of a hollow square, and waited for the enemy to attack us. The result was that Gen. Blount passed with his whole force around our left, united his forces with Gen. Heron, and together they attacked our lines.

Our brigade, Gen. Fagan's, was drawn up in line of battle on the crest of a hill; our batteries and skirmishers were placed about three hundred yards in front, near the foot of the hill and on the edge of a field. About 12 o'clock the enemy commenced a most furious cannonading. Shot and shell flew thick and fast in all directions. Five batteries were directed against us, while we had only two with which to reply, and these being smooth bore, soon ceased, because they were out of range.

At length, about one o'clock, we received the order to advance from Gen. Fagan in person. The ground in my front was covered by an almost impenetrable thicket. So great was the difficulty in getting forward through the thick undergrowth, that I asked and obtained permission to advance by the right of companies, rather than in line. I continued to advance until the rapid and heavy firing in my front convinced me that the enemy was moving up in heavy force, when I threw my men into line and halted, expecting every moment to see my skirmishers running in. A moment after halting I heard loud cheering just ahead of me, but I could not tell who it was that cheered, nor why they cheered. One of our batteries (Blocker's) which I supposed to be at least three hundred yards to my right, was immediately in my front; but the thicket was so dense that I could see nothing ahead of me more than forty yards. It was the Abolitionists that cheered, and they were charging Blocker's Battery. As they rushed up and took the battery their blue coats shone through the thicket, and I saw them. Both parties discovered each other about the same time, and rapid and deadly volleys were exchanged. for a few moments the fight was terrific. I heard the Yankee commander order his men to mount the horses and take away the guns: and then, for the first time, I understood that one of our batteries had been captured. Not a moment was to be lost. I dashed to the front and called upon my brave "Conscripts" to charge and retake the guns. They responded with an Arkansas "yell" that rang out loud and clear above the roar of battle, rushed forward at a double quick, drove the enemy from the battery, out of the thicket, through a little orchard in our front, down the hill and across the field in utter confusion and dismay back to their batteries, at least a half mile distant. We now fell back to the edge of the thicket and reformed. Scarcely had we done so when the enemy again advanced with fresh regiments to retake their lost ground. Our whole brigade now advanced to meet them. We charged and drove them, with great slaughter, a second time back to their batteries. Again we fell back and reformed, and again the Yankees, with increased numbers and fresh regiments advanced upon our position, making the most stubborn and determined efforts to take it. But our men had now become accustomed to victory, and they charged with such fury that the enemy broke and fled in the utmost disorder, leaving the ground literally covered with their dead. Every time that we drove them down the hill, their batteries would open furiously upon us, throwing solid shot, shell, canister and grape. The enemy's loss in killed, on this part of the field, was really frightful, and is without any parallel in this war, according to the numbers engaged. We fought them with only four regiments, numbering in all not more than fifteen hundred men, and yet we killed outright upon the field not less than seven hundred of them, to say nothing of the wounded. Among them I saw two full-blooded negroes lying near the battery that my regiment retook. The battle now ceased upon our right only to be renewed with increased violence on our extreme left. I had reformed my regiment after the last charge, but I was without orders. When I heard the terrible fire on our extreme left, without waiting for further orders, I moved my regiment rapidly in that direction. We advanced at "double quick" something less than a half mile, when we came in full view of this most terrible contest. The enemy were pressing our men very hard. I found my regiment at right angles with the line occupied by the enemy, and charged him instantly, both in flank and rear. The effect was like magic. In five minutes his lines were broken and disordered and he in full retreat. But again the enemy rallied, and came back with more determination than ever. They assailed us with fresh regiments and overwhelming numbers. The fight was now desperate and bloody beyond all description. The enemy advanced amid a storm of bullets within fifty yards of our lines, when our men, with loud shouts, rushed forward to meet them, and the closing scenes of Waterloo itself were not more terrific than the scenes that were here enacted. But the hired assassins of Lincoln could not stand before the free sons of the South. They broke and fled in all directions, leaving the ground covered with their mangled corpses. The slaughter was horrible to behold, and for the numbers engaged is without parallel in this war. Thus ended the battle of "Prairie Grove." I omitted to state that the other regiments of our brigade took no part in this last engagement, remaining in line of battle upon the right, to meet any further movements of the enemy in that direction. The loss of the brigade was over 500 killed and wounded; in our whole army about 1200. The enemy's loss can not be less than 4,000 killed and wounded, beside 500 prisoners. My loss was 144 killed and wounded, out of 350, with which I went into action. Out of 27 officers in my regiment 18 were killed and wounded. I never dismounted during the entire engagement, and yet strange to say, though I was in the hottest fire, though my regiment made five desperate and bloody charges, though five batteries were playing upon us for six mortal hours, I never received a single scratch, nor was my horse touched by a single bullet. My battle-flag was literally riddled with balls.

For want of subsistence our army has again fallen back to Van Buren. The enemy has been heavily reinforced since the battle, and it may be that we will soon have another engagement.

Your affectionate brother,

A. T. Hawthorn

==== Reorganization and consolidation with Chew's battalion ====
After the retreat from Prairie Grove to Van Buren, Hawthorn's regiment underwent a major reorganization on December 16, 1862. Hailey's, Perkins' and Tumlinson's cavalry companies had been dismounted and organized into Chew's battalion prior to the battle of Prairie Grove, and, in the general reorganization of the Confederate army after the battle, the companies were consolidated with Hawthorn's Regiment. The U.S. War Department clerks who created the Compiled Service Records combined all the service records of these cavalrymen into "Cocke's regiment", rather than catalog them as independent companies. The problem is that many of the men who served in those companies were not around when the companies were consolidated with Cocke's regiment.

- Company A, Commanded by Captain Pleasant Roper,
- Company B, Commanded by Captain J.H. Borning, organized by consolidation of old Company F and old Company G,
- Company C, Commanded by Captain Richard Davis, organized by consolidated of old Company C and old Company I,
- Company D, Commanded by Captain Walton Watkins,
- Company E, Commanded by Captain W.J.F. Jones, organized by consolidation of old company E and Company L,
- Company F, Commanded by Captain George Harrod, formerly old Company K.
- Company G, Commanded by Captain Elbert Dawson. This company had previously been assigned as Company A, Chew's Sharpshooter Battalion. The company was organized at King's River, Madison county, September 3, 1862; enlisted at Elm Springs, Washington county, September 12, 1862.
- Company H, Commanded by Captain B.T. Hailey, formerly Companies C and D, Chew's battalion, Perkins' and Hailey's dismounted cavalry companies. These companies had also previously served in Major Gipson's Battalion of Mounted Rifles. Captain Hailey's company was dismounted on August 24, 1862, and Captain Perkin's company was dismounted no September 16, 1862. After being dismounted the companies were assigned to Chew's battalion and participate in the battle of Prairie Grove with that unit and suffered ten killed and wounded.
- Company I, Commanded by Captain Martin V. Cook, formerly Company B,
- Company K, Commanded by Captain Jacob C. Mules, organized by Captain Wiley Tomlinson (KIA Prairie Grove) as Tomlinson's Cavalry at Waldron, Scott county, July 4, 1862; enlisted at Big Creek, Sebastian county, July 20, 1862; The Company was assigned to Maj Gipson's Battalion of Mounted Rifles, before being dismounted and assigned as Company B, Chew's battalion.

=== Helena ===
Fagan's Brigade spent the winter of 1863–64 in camp near Little Rock, remaining there until June when the unit began the movements that would lead to the Battle of Helena. During the attack on Union forces at Helena, Arkansas, on July 4, 1863, Fagan's Brigade was assigned to Sterling Price's Division of Theophilus H. Holmes's army. Fagan's 1,300 men were assigned to capture Hindman's Hill southwest of the city, but they were ultimately unsuccessful. Amidst confusing and vague orders to "attack at daylight" from Holmes, Fagan and Price failed to coordinate their attacks. Price interpreted this order to mean an attack at sunrise and Fagan interpreted it to mean an attack at first light. The result was that Fagan was surprised to find his attack on Hindman Hill was opposed by artillery fire from Graveyard Hill, which was Price's objective. General Fagan had expected Price to be engaged already with that battery. Fagan's artillery had not been able to reach the battlefield because of felled trees blocking the road. Fagan had no artillery available to silence the Federal guns and had no choice but to order his troops to try to take the hill while under artillery fire. Fagan's men reached the summit of the hill and managed to seize the outer fortifications but were pinned down just short of the summit by the two Union batteries. The exposed Confederates were targeted by every remaining gun on the battlefield as well as the heavy guns of the USS Tyler. By 10:30 Holmes realized that his position had deteriorated and that he could make no further headway. The attack on the Union base had failed, and a general retreat was ordered. The regiment reported 137 casualties during the Battle of Helena, including 17 killed, 52 wounded and 67 missing. Major Cocke was among the wounded. In his report, Colonel Hawthorn stated that Captain Walton Watkins, Co. D, was killed. "Here also the much-beloved Capt. Walton Watkins, while most gallantly leading his company over the enemy's works, fell. It has never been my lot to witness more gallantry and more determined courage than displayed by this young officer on that day. We mourn the loss of other brave and true officers who fell during the engagement." However, Captain Watkins' compiled service record states that he was wounded and captured and sent to Overton Hospital at Memphis; then transferred to Johnson's Island Military Prison on August 6, 1863; and forwarded to New Orleans for exchange on January 9, 1865.

=== Little Rock ===
The 39th (Hawthorn's) Regiment Arkansas Infantry Regiment, with Fagan's Brigade participated in the defense of Little Rock on September 10–11. The Union advance upon Little Rock was opposed mainly by the Confederate cavalry divisions of Generals Marmaduke and Walker. The Confederate infantry brigades were dug in on the north side of the Arkansas River. According to Captain Ethan Allen Pinnell of the 8th Missouri Infantry Regiment,

Our works extend from the [Arkansas] river two miles below the city [of Little Rock], to the eastern part of Crystal Hill, a distance of six miles. Gen'l Fagan's Brig. is on the extreme right, Parsons on Fagan's left, Frost in the center and McRea's on the left.

The Union forces established a pontoon bridge near Bayou Fourche, and crossed to the south side of the very low Arkansas River. With his works on the north side of the river now flanked, Price was forced to abandon the city on September 10, after a brief engagement at Bayou Fourche. Price's army withdrew in the direction of Rockport. Colonel Alexander T. Hawthorn took command of the brigade in the fall of 1863 and Colonel John Cocke took command of the regiment. The regiment spent the winter of 1863–1864 in Camden, Arkansas.

=== Red River ===
In the Spring of 1864, the regiment was assigned to Brig. Gen. Hawthorn's Brigade, of Major-General Churchill's Arkansas Division Red River Campaign. In early in March and early April 1864, Churchill's Division marched south to oppose Union Major-General Nathaniel P. Banks during the Red River Campaign of north-central Louisiana defeating him at the Battle of Pleasant Hill on April 10, 1864. Hawthorn's Brigade was initially left behind at Camden, Arkansas, when the rest of the army went to join Lieutenant-General Dick Taylor. They were eventually called upon as well, and left Camden for Louisiana on April 5. It reached Shreveport around April 14 or 15 when they got news about the Confederate victories at Mansfield and Pleasant Hill. On the 16th, they started their march back to Arkansas with the rest of the army.

==== Jenkins' Ferry ====
Churchill's Division marched back north into Arkansas to deal with the other part of the Federal advance, Major-General Frederick Steele's Camden Expedition. The division arrived after a long forced march at Woodlawn, Arkansas, on April 26, where they rested overnight, then joined the pursuit of Steele's retreating army, catching it trying to cross the Saline River near Jenkins' Ferry. Colonel John B. Cocke was killed in action during the battle of the same name. Lieutenant-Colonel Cadwallader Polk assumed command of the regiment after Cocke's death.

=== Close of the war ===
On September 30, 1864, the 39th (Cocke's) Regiment Arkansas Infantry Regiment was assigned to 4th (Hawthorn's) Brigade, 1st (Churchill's) Division, Second (Magruder's) Corps, Army of the Trans-Mississippi, and remained in that assignment through December 31, 1864. On November 17, 1864, a union spy reported that Hawthorn's Brigade and Churchill's Division was in the vicinity of Camden, in Ouachita County, Arkansas. On December 31, 1864, General E. Kirby Smith's report on the organization of his forces lists the 34th Arkansas, under the command of Colonel Brooks as belonging to 4th (Hawthorn's) Brigade, 1st (Churchill's) Division, Second (Magruder's) Corps, Army of the Trans-Mississippi.

Hawthorn's Brigade was ordered to move to Dooley's Bluff, near Washington, in Hempstead County on January 19, 1865, in order to assist with the building of fortifications along the Red River. On January 22, 1865, Major-General Churchill was ordered to move his division to Minden, Louisiana, and occupy winter quarters. On January 23, 1865, Churchill sent a dispatch to Colonel Hawthorn at Dooley's Ferry and directed his movement to Minden, Louisiana.

Union commanders in the Department of the Gulf reported on March 20, 1865, that General Hawthorn's brigade was composed of four regiments and was located a Minden, Louisiana, with the rest of Churchill's Division. In early April 1865, the division concentrated near Shreveport, Louisiana, and then moved to Marshall, Texas, by mid April 1865.

=== Surrender and parole ===
The Regiment was surrendered, along with the rest of the Trans-Mississippi Department, on May 26, 1865, by Lieutenant-General Simon B. Buckner. With very few exceptions, the Arkansas Infantry regiments in the Trans-Mississippi simply disbanded without formally surrendering. When the Trans-Mississippi Department surrendered, all of the Arkansas infantry regiments were encamped in and around Marshall, Texas (war-ravaged Arkansas no longer able to subsist the army). The regiments were ordered to report to Shreveport, Louisiana, to be paroled but none of them did so. Some individual soldiers went to Shreveport on their own to be paroled, others reported to Union garrisons at Fort Smith, Pine Bluff, or Little Rock to receive their paroles, but for the most part, the men simply went home.

== Battles ==
The regiment participated in the following battles:

- American Civil War
  - Battle of Prairie Grove
  - Battle of Helena
  - Battle of Mansfield
  - Battle of Pleasant Hill
  - Battle of Jenkins' Ferry

== See also ==
- List of Confederate units from Arkansas
