= B. Frank Gordon =

Confederate States Army colonel

Benjamin Franklin Gordon
- Born: May 18, 1826; Henry County, Tennessee
- Died: September 22, 1866 (aged 40); Waverly, Missouri
- Burial place: Waverly, Missouri
- Military career
- Allegiance: United States; Confederate States
- Branch: United States Army; Confederate States Army
- Service years: 1847–1848; 1861–1865
- Rank: Private, USA; Colonel, CSA; Assigned to duty as: Brigadier General
- Conflicts: American Civil War

Benjamin Franklin Gordon (May 18, 1826 – September 22, 1866), commonly known as B. Frank Gordon, was a Confederate States Army colonel during the American Civil War (Civil War). Gordon had been a private and bugler for a Missouri regiment serving in the U.S. Army during the Mexican–American War. Gordon served in the Confederate Army under Brigadier General Joseph O. "Jo" Shelby in Missouri and Arkansas in the Confederate Trans-Mississippi Department throughout the war. On May 16, 1865, with the war coming to an end, General E. Kirby Smith, as the Confederate commander of the Trans-Mississippi Department, assigned Gordon to duty as a brigadier general. The Confederate government took no action on the appointment and Confederate President Jefferson Davis did not officially appoint and nominate Gordon to the rank of brigadier general because the Confederate Senate last met on March 18, 1865, and Davis was captured by Union troops on May 10, 1865. Although he was only aged 40 at his death, Gordon survived the war by little more than a year.

== Early life ==
Gordon was born in Henry County, Tennessee, on May 18, 1826. His parents, Thomas W. Gordon and Eliza (Brooks) Gordon moved the family to Lafayette County, Missouri in 1831. Thomas Gordon was a farmer, who later was elected to the position of justice of the Lafayette County Court.

B. Frank Gordon, as he was sometimes known, was a private and bugler in Doniphan's Missouri regiment in the Mexican–American War. Following that war, in 1849, he went to California to prospect for gold. He later returned to Waverly, Missouri and became a partner in a merchandising business. In 1858, Gordon opened his own store where he sold drugs and groceries. His wife's maiden name was Sarah Henton.

== American Civil War service ==
Gordon was an early enlistee in the pro-Confederate Missouri State Guard. He became adjutant of the 1st Brigade, 2nd Division of that guard and advanced to major. Gordon was severely wounded at the Battle of Wilson's Creek.

In 1862, Gordon helped Jo Shelby raise a regiment of cavalry in Lafayette County, Missouri. On September 12, 1862, this regiment was mustered into service as the 5th Missouri Cavalry Regiment (CSA). Shelby became the regiment's colonel while Gordon became its lieutenant colonel. When Shelby thereafter began to lead his "Iron Brigade," including the 5th Missouri Cavalry Regiment, Gordon succeeded to command of the regiment. On December 7, 1862, the regiment fought at the Battle of Prairie Grove. Shelby praised Gordon's courageous conduct in his report on the battle.

Confederate Brigadier General John S. Marmaduke led a force including Shelby's brigade and Gordon's regiment on two raids into Missouri in early 1863. Gordon led Shelby's brigade during the Little Rock Campaign of August and September 1863 while Shelby recovered from a wound. Shelby led his brigade, including the 5th Missouri Cavalry now under Gordon's immediate command, on Shelby's Great Raid through Missouri between September 22, 1863, and November 3, 1863. Despite his command of a brigade through much of 1863, Shelby was not promoted to brigadier general until December 15, 1863. Gordon became full colonel of the 5th Missouri Cavalry when Shelby was promoted to brigadier general on December 15.

In March and April 1864, Shelby's men harassed and skirmished with the Union Army force under the command of Major General Frederick Steele during his Camden Expedition, part of the Red River Campaign. Gordon led more than one charge against the Union forces during Steele's march from Little Rock to Camden, Arkansas. On April 25, 1864, Gordon led his regiment at the Battle of Marks' Mills where they captured two Union artillery pieces from the detachment of Union Lieutenant Colonel Francis M. Drake when Shelby's force attacked the Union left wing of the detachment which had been sent from Camden toward Pine Bluff, Arkansas, to obtained supplies for Steele's force which was increasingly besieged by gathering Confederate forces at Camden. The Confederates outnumbered the Union force at Marks' Mills by more than 2 to 1 and overwhelmed it, taking about 1,300 prisoners and about 240 wagons. The overall commander of the Confederate cavalry force at Marks' Mills, Brigadier General James Fagan, led the Confederates, including Shelby's command, toward Pine Bluff in an effort to capture the Union supply depot. The Confederates did not make it to Pine Bluff due to flooding. They also did not return fast enough to cut off Steele's return march to Little Rock or to participate in the Battle of Jenkins' Ferry, the one big engagement during the retreat before the Union troops escaped across the swollen Saline River.

Gordon's regiment next engaged the 10th Illinois Cavalry Regiment at Searcy, Arkansas, in July 1864 and routed them. Gordon led his men to a similar victory at Helena, Arkansas, two weeks later.

Under Shelby, Gordon led his men on Major General Sterling Price's 1864 raid into Missouri from August 1864 to December 1864. Price was decisively defeated and driven from Missouri at the Battle of Westport on October 23, 1864. Gordon's regiment made a successful attack during the battle but had to abandon their efforts and cut their way through encircling Union troops when the Confederate rear collapsed. Gordon's men acted as a rear guard had helped slow down the Union pursuit after the Federal force had shattered two of Price's divisions at the Battle of Mine Creek and the Second Battle of Newtonia, the final battles during Price's Raid.

After the conclusion of Price's Raid, Shelby moved up to division command and Gordon received permanent command of Shelby's "Iron Brigade." As the war was winding down and communications with the Trans-Mississippi Department were becoming slower and more difficult, Gordon did not receive a promotion to brigadier general. In a gesture with little more than symbolic significance, General E. Kirby Smith, as commander of the Trans-Mississippi Department, assigned Gordon to command as a brigadier general on May 16, 1865, a month after the surrender of the Army of Northern Virginia and six days after the capture of Jefferson Davis by Union troops in Georgia.

== Aftermath ==
After E. Kirby Smith's surrender of the Confederate Trans-Mississippi Department, Gordon went with Jo Shelby and some of his officers and men to Mexico. These men could not decide on which side of the war between the imperial forces of Maximilian I of Mexico and republican forces led by Benito Juárez. Gordon soon decided to return to Missouri, sparing him some of the difficulties encountered by Shelby and his men before those who had not died during the time in Mexico returned.

Nonetheless, Gordon did not survive long after the Civil War. Gordon died on September 22, 1866, in Waverly, Missouri. He is buried in Waverly Cemetery, sometimes called Old Waverly Cemetery.

== See also ==
- List of American Civil War generals (Acting Confederate)
