= 6th Arkansas Infantry Regiment =

Infantry regiment of the Confederate States Army

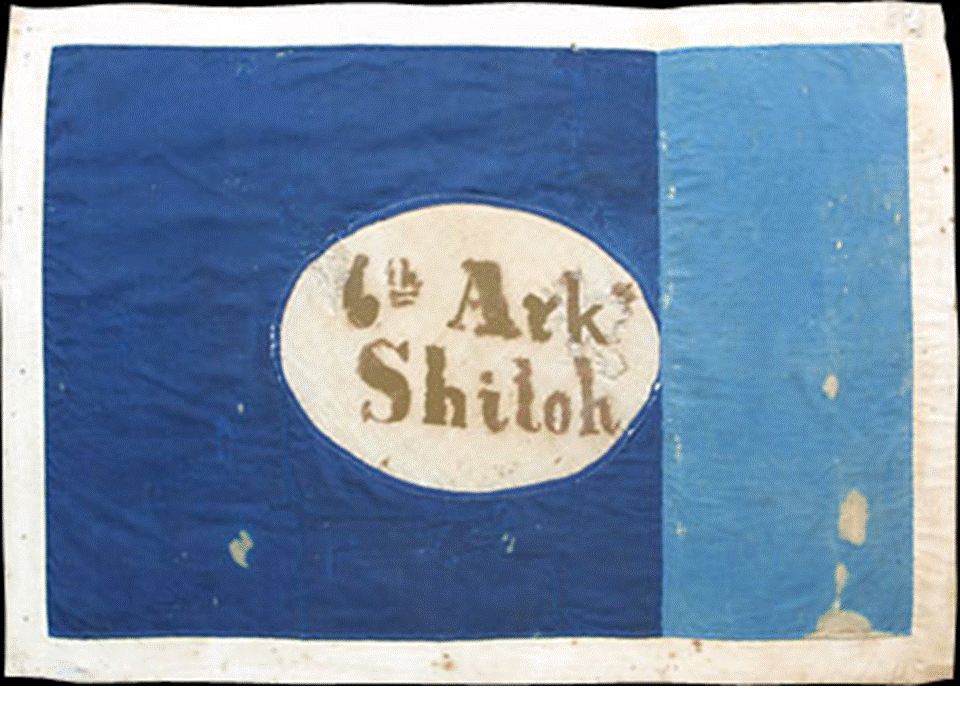
- Regimental color of the Sixth Arkansas at the Old State House Museum in Little Rock, Arkansas
- Active: 1861–1865
- Disbanded: May 1, 1865
- Country: Confederate States
- Allegiance: Arkansas
- Branch: Army
- Role: Infantry
- Size: Regiment
- Facings: Light blue
- Battles: American Civil War; Battle of Rowlett's Station; Battle of Shiloh; Siege of Corinth; Battle of Perryville; Battle of Murfreesboro; Battle of Liberty Gap; Battle of Chickamauga; Battle of Missionary Ridge; Battle of Ringgold Gap; Battle of Rocky Face Ridge; Battle of Resaca; Battle of New Hope Church; Battle of Pickett's Mill; Battle of Kennesaw Mountain; Battle of Peachtree Creek; Battle of Atlanta; Battle of Jonesboro; Battle of Franklin; Battle of Nashville; Battle of Bentonville
- Battle honors: Shiloh

Commanders
- Notable commanders: Col. Alexander T. Hawthorn

The 6th Arkansas Infantry Regiment, commonly known as the "Sixth Arkansas", was a line infantry formation of the Confederate States Army in the Western Theater of the American Civil War.

Organized in 1861 with volunteers from the southern Arkansas (to include several antebellum militia companies), the regiment was among the first Arkansas units mustered into Confederate service. Sustaining heavy casualties at Shiloh and Perryville, it spent the remainder of the war amalgamated with the "Seventh Arkansas," resulting in the creation of the 6th and 7th Arkansas Infantry Regiment.

== Formation ==
The 6th Infantry was mustered into state service in Little Rock, Arkansas, on June 10, 1861, a little less than a month after the state first began raising infantry regiments. The 6th Arkansas, also known as the 6th Arkansas, State Troops and the 6th Arkansas Volunteer Infantry, was made up of volunteer companies from the following counties:

- Company A, the "Capital Guards" of Little Rock, in Pulaski County, commanded by Captain Gordon N. Peay. This company was one of the oldest militia organizations in the state. Its officers were first elected in 1858, and included Peter Hotze, later to be one of Little Rock's most prominent businessmen and community member, owner of the Hotze House in Little Rock, a National Historic Landmark. The unit played a prominent role in the seizure of the Little Rock Arsenal.
- Company B, the "Yellow Jackets" of Calhoun County, commanded by Captain P. H. Echols. The company was originally organized on May 9, 1861, as a volunteer company in the 54th Regiment, Arkansas State Militia. The company was in state service from May 5 until July 26, 1861, but was discharged when the regiment was mustered into Confederate service on July 26. Fourteen men from Company B accepted the transfer to Confederate command and were reassigned to Company H.
- Company C, the "Dallas Rifles" of Dallas County, commanded by Captain F. J. Cameron. The company was originally organized on May 9, 1861, as a volunteer company in the 46th Regiment, Arkansas State Militia.
- Company D, the "Ouachita Voyageurs", or "Ouachita Voltiquers" of Ouachita County, commanded by Captain J.W. Kingswell. This company was originally organized on May 31, 1861, as a volunteer company in the 39th Regiment, Arkansas State Militia.
- Company E, the "Dixie Grays" of Arkansas County, commanded by Captain Sam G. Smith. This company was originally organized on June 1, 1861, as a volunteer company in the 1st Regiment, Arkansas State Militia.
- Company F, the "Lafayette Guards" of Lafayette County, commanded by Captain Sam H. Dill. This company was originally organized on June 3, 1861, as a volunteer company in the 40th Regiment, Arkansas State Militia.
- Company G, the "Columbia Guards" of Magnolia in Columbia County, commanded by Captain J. W. Austin. This company was originally organized on May 10, 1861, as a volunteer company in the 56th Regiment, Arkansas State Militia.
- Company H, the "City Guards" of Camden in Ouachita County, commanded by Captain S. H. Southerland. This company was originally organized on May 9, 1861, as a volunteer company in the 39th Regiment, Arkansas State Militia. The first company commander was Richard Lyon.
- Company I, the "Lisbon Invincibles" of Union County, commanded by Captain Sam Turner.
- Company J, the "Ouachita Grays" of Ouachita County, commanded by Captain Hope T. Hodnett. This company was originally organized on June 1, 1861, as a volunteer company in the 39th Regiment, Arkansas State Militia.

The regiment's first commander was Colonel Richard Lyon. The other regimental officers were:

- Lieutenant Colonel Alexander T. Hawthorn
- Major D. L. Kilgore
- C. A. Bridewell Adjutant
- John F. Ritchie, Quartermaster

The regiment was armed with weapons which the state confiscated when the Federal Arsenal at Little Rock was seized by Arkansas State Militia troops in February 1861. Disposition of the weapons found in the Arsenal is somewhat sketchy, but from various records it can be surmised that the 5th, 6th, 7th, and 8th Arkansas Infantry Regiments, mustered in June, 1861, were issued M1816/M1822 .69 caliber flintlocks. They retained these weapons until April 1862, when they were able to exchange them for more modern percussion rifles scavenged from the battlefield at Shiloh. The unit began with mixed uniforms, but by the end of 1861 had been issued matching uniforms from the Little Rock supply depot. Prior to that, they marched to Pocahontas, Arkansas, to be attached to the 2nd Division of the Provisional Army of Arkansas commanded by Major General James Yell. While stationed there, measles broke out in the camp, and many soldiers died. When offered the opportunity to vote on accepting transfer from state service to Confederate service, Company B declined to re-enlist. A few other soldiers from other companies also declined to extend their enlistments. The remainder of the regiment was mustered into Confederate service on July 26, 1861, at Pittman's Ferry, Arkansas. The 6th Arkansas, with the 2nd, 5th, 7th, and 8th Arkansas Infantry units was initially assigned to a brigade under Brigadier General William J. Hardee.

== History ==
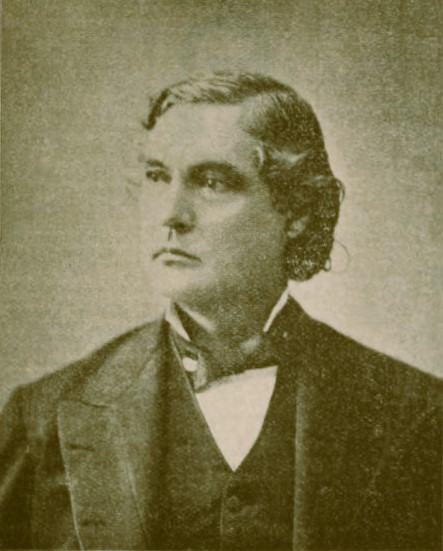
Alexander T. Hawthorn commanded the regiment at Shiloh and Perryville in 1862.

The 6th Arkansas saw no action in the coming months, only taking part in a small raid into Missouri. By October 1861, the regiment, along with the rest of General Hardee's division had been sent to Columbus, Kentucky, to become the Army of Central Kentucky. When Colonel Lyon was killed during a river crossing, Alexander T. Hawthorn assumed command. Gordon N. Peay of Company A was promoted to replace Hawthorn as lieutenant colonel. They experienced their first real combat while supporting Terry's Texas Rangers near Woodsonville, Kentucky. On March 29, 1862, the Army of Central Kentucky was merged into the Army of Mississippi. General Albert Sidney Johnston ordered the army to consolidate in northern Mississippi.

The regiment saw its first true combat during the Battle of Shiloh, where it performed extremely well. The 6th Arkansas was decisively engaged at Shiloh with the Confederate left wing, engaged against Sherman's Federal troops. The 6th Arkansas was able to re-arm itself with "Springfield rifles" (probably .58 cal. M1855 rifle muskets) from Federal weapons left on the field at Shiloh.

In early May 1862, Confederate forces underwent an army-wide reorganization due to the passage of the Conscription Act by the Confederate Congress in April 1862. All twelve-month regiments had to re-muster and enlist for two additional years or the duration of the war; a new election of officers was ordered; and men who were exempted from service by age or other reasons under the Conscription Act were allowed to take a discharge and go home. Officers who did not choose to stand for re-election were also offered a discharge. The reorganization was accomplished among all the Arkansas regiments in and around Corinth, Mississippi, following the Battle of Shiloh. During its reorganization, Colonel Hawthorn chose not to stand for re-election and Samuel G. Smith was elected to the colonelcy. Colonel Smith would later die as a prisoner in a Union hospital during the Atlanta campaign.

Sent to Chattanooga, Tennessee, following the evacuation by Confederate forces of Corinth, Mississippi, the 6th Arkansas became a part of the Army of Mississippi under Major General Braxton Bragg and participated in the Kentucky Campaign.

During the Battle of Perryville, the 7th Arkansas Infantry Regiment took devastating casualties, leaving it all but ineffective. The 6th Arkansas had also suffered heavy casualties in that same battle, so the 7th Arkansas' remaining soldiers were consolidated with the 6th Arkansas. The 6th and 7th Arkansas Infantry Regiments were combined on December 22, 1862, and remained consolidated for the remainder of the war. The rolls of each company were, however, continued as though no consolidation had ever been made. The following consolidations also occurred among the companies of the 6th Arkansas:

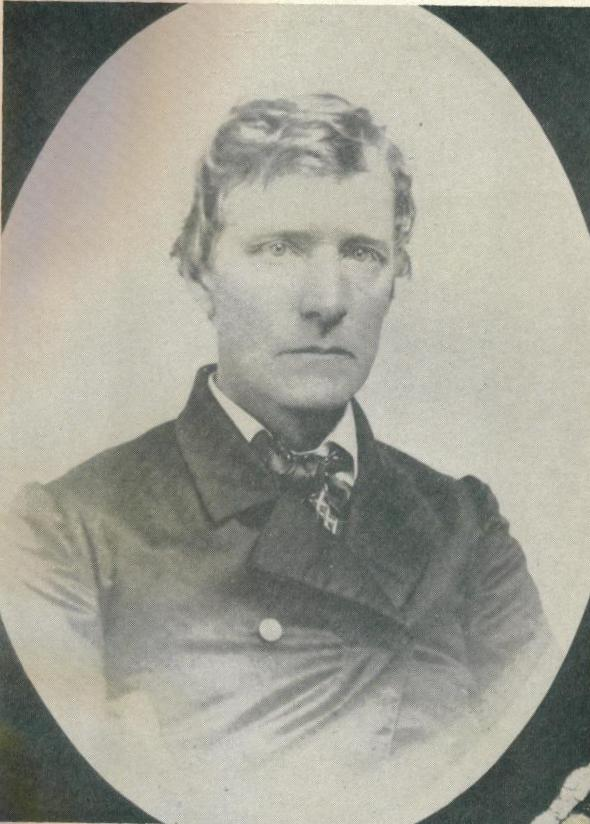
Gordon N. Peay commanded the "Capitol Guards," an antebellum militia company from Little Rock. In 1862, he would be appointed Adjutant General of Arkansas.

- Companies A and F, 6th Arkansas were consolidated in May or June 1862.
- Companies D and H were merged on June 20, 1862.
- Companies B and E were consolidated December 22, 1862, and were known as Co D, 6th & 7th Infantry Regiment.
- Companies C and G were consolidated December 22, 1862, and were known as Co E, 6th & 7th Infantry Regiment.

From December 31, 1862, through January 2, 1863, the 6th and 7th Consolidated Arkansas Infantry Regiment was heavily engaged in the Battle of Murfreesboro, losing a total of 29 killed and 140 wounded. The unit fought in the Battle of Chickamauga and the Battles for Chattanooga. Colonel D. A. Gillespie was wounded at Chickamauga and died in a hospital on October 26, 1862. The combined regiment had 16 disabled at the Battle of Ringgold Gap, totaled 314 men and 265 arms in December 1863, and sustained 66 casualties in the Battle of Atlanta. The entire regiment was captured along with several other regiments during the Battle of Jonesboro, which was part of the Atlanta campaign, but the men were released several weeks later in a prisoner exchange. They joined the Army of Tennessee in time to participate in the Franklin-Nashville Campaign. After the retreat from Tennessee, the regiment was moved to North Carolina where it took part in the final charge of the army during the Battle of Bentonville.

== Battles ==
The 6th - 7th Arkansas actively took part in the following battles, skirmishes and campaigns:

- Battle of Rowlett's Station, Kentucky, December 17, 1861
- Battle of Shiloh, Tennessee, April 6–7, 1862.
- Siege of Corinth, Mississippi, April–June 1862.
- Kentucky Campaign, Kentucky, August–October, 1862
  - Battle of Perryville, Kentucky, October 8, 1862.
- Battle of Murfreesboro, Tennessee, December 31, 1862 – January 3, 1863.
- Tullahoma Campaign, June 24 – July 3, 1863.
  - Battle of Liberty Gap, Tennessee, June 24–26, 1863.
- Chickamauga Campaign, Georgia, August–September, 1863.
  - Battle of Chickamauga, Georgia, September 19–20, 1863.
- Chattanooga campaign, September to November 1863.
  - Battle of Missionary Ridge, Tennessee, November 25, 1863.
  - Battle of Ringgold Gap, Georgia, November 27, 1863.
- Atlanta campaign, May to September 1864.
  - Battle of Rocky Face Ridge, Georgia, May 5–11, 1864.
  - Battle of Resaca, Georgia, May 14–15, 1864.
  - Battle of New Hope Church, Georgia, May 25 – June 4, 1864.
  - Battle of Pickett's Mill, Georgina, May 27, 1864.
  - Battle of Kennesaw Mountain, Georgia, June 27, 1864.
  - Battle of Peachtree Creek, Georgia, July 20, 1864.
  - Siege of Atlanta, Georgia, July 22, 1864.
  - Battle of Jonesboro, Georgia, August 31 – September 1, 1864.
- Franklin–Nashville Campaign, Alabama, Georgia, and Tennessee, September 18 – December 27, 1864
  Battle of Spring Hill, Tennessee, November 29, 1864.
  - Battle of Franklin, Tennessee, November 30, 1864.
  - Battle of Nashville, Tennessee, December 15–16, 1864.
- Carolinas campaign, February – April 1865.
  - Battle of Bentonville, North Carolina, March 19–21, 1865.

Toward the end of the war, ten depleted Arkansas regiments, including the 7th Arkansas, were lumped together as the 1st Arkansas Consolidated Infantry, on April 9, 1865.

== Regimental colors ==
At least six flags attributed to the 6th Arkansas Infantry or the 6th & 7th Consolidated Infantry Regiments are known to exist.

The earliest flag known for the 6th Arkansas is a 1st pattern Hardee (Buckner) battle flag- 28" x 38", no white border on three sides, and only a 2" white border on the staff edge. (See Battle Flags of the Confederate Army of Tennessee, p. 55) This flag is in the collections of the Smithsonian Institution in Washington, DC; accession no. 18342. This flag (according to its file card) "was made by a soldier of the Sixth Arkansas, from remnants of blue and white shirts." The blue field is extensively pieced.

National Color of the Sixth Arkansas. A silk Confederate 1st national flag of the 6th Arkansas Infantry with battle honor "PERRYVILLE" attached by means of a rectangular applique on the reverse; 55" x 84 1/2" (exclusive of fringe), badly faded. It was captured when found in an abandoned railroad car at Macon, Georgia, on 20 May 1865 by Sergt. John W. Deen, 17th Indiana Mounted. Infantry; and is War Department capture no. 500. According to a 1907 letter, this flag was only used at Perryville, then retired before Murfreesboro. It is currently in the collection of the Old State House Museum in Little Rock.

Regimental Color of the Sixth Arkansas. The second known flag of the 6th Arkansas is a 2nd pattern, Hardee battle flag, 31" x 43 1/2", with white border all around and inscription "6th Arks/Shiloh" on an elliptical central disc in black paint or ink. This flag presumably was used by the 6th Arkansas as its battle flag from sometime in early 1862 until the flag was too worn for further use. One third of the fly portion of the blue field is replaced, presumably a repair, but the date of the repair is uncertain. This flag is currently in the collection of the Old State House Museum in Little Rock. Dimensions: 31.5" x 43.5"; blue wool bunting, white cotton, with black painted letters.

National Color of the 6th and 7th Arkansas. A Confederate 2nd national flag of the combined 6th & 7th Arkansas Infantry. currently in the Missouri State archives in Columbia, Missouri. When examined in 1978, it consisted of a 40 1/2" x 76 1/2" white bunting field with a red canton bearing an unedged 3 1/2" wide St. Andrew's cross bearing thirteen white cotton stars, those on the arms 3 1/2" across their points, the center 5" across its points, applied to the reverse and cut away on the obverse (reverse side accordingly 1/2" larger in diameter.) The white field bears the following inscriptions: (upper- in outline scrolls) "6th and 7th/ARK/REG'T" (middle) "God & Our Country"; (lower) "SHILOH. PERRYVILLE. MURFREESBORO.", all in red painted lettering. This flag dates no earlier than May 1863 and was probably a "parade" flag used briefly between May and June 1863, however no firm history survives regarding it.

Regimental Color of the 6th and 7th Arkansas. This is a 2nd pattern Hardee battle flag, originally of the 7th Arkansas, but modified for the combined 6th & 7th Arkansas; 30" x 37 1/4"; captured at Jonesboro, Georgia, on 1 September 1864 by Private Henry B. Mattingly, 10th Kentucky Infantry; War Department capture no. 531. This flag bears the embroidered battle honor "SHILOH" in the center of the elliptical disc, over embroidered "Down with the Tyrant", and with "7TH ARK." above it in paint, with "6TH &" added in front of it, both in black. Similarly, three battle honors, "PERRYVILLE." "MURFREESBORO." and "CHICKAMAUGA" painted in black on the white border. Also painted in white on blue field, "LIBERTY GAP", "RINGGOLD GAP", and "TUNNEL HILL, Tenn." This is the flag that the combined 6th and 7th Arkansas carried from their consolidation in November, 1862 until its loss in September 1864. This flag was captured, along with the regiment, when Govan's Arkansas Brigade was overrun and captured by a Federal charge on their position at Jonesboro, Georgia, on September 1, 1864. Private Henry B. Mattingly of Co. B, 10th Kentucky Infantry (Union) won the Medal of Honor for the capture of this flag. This flag is in the collection of the Old State House Museum in Little Rock, Arkansas. Dimensions: 28.5" x 37.5"; blue wool bunting, white cotton, silk embroidery, with blue, black, and white painted letters.

Camp Color of the 6th and 7th Arkansas. This is a small (23 1/2" x 28 1/8") flag, most likely a camp color or flag marker, in the form of the 2nd pattern Hardee battle flag, with the Arkansas coat-of-arms painted on the elliptical disc and the designation "6TH and 7TH ARK. REG." painted on the upper border in black. It was acquired in 1976 by the National Park Service, and is on display at the Stone's River National Battlefield visitor center in Murfreesboro, TN. Dimensions: 28" x 38"; blue wool bunting, white cotton, with black painted letters.

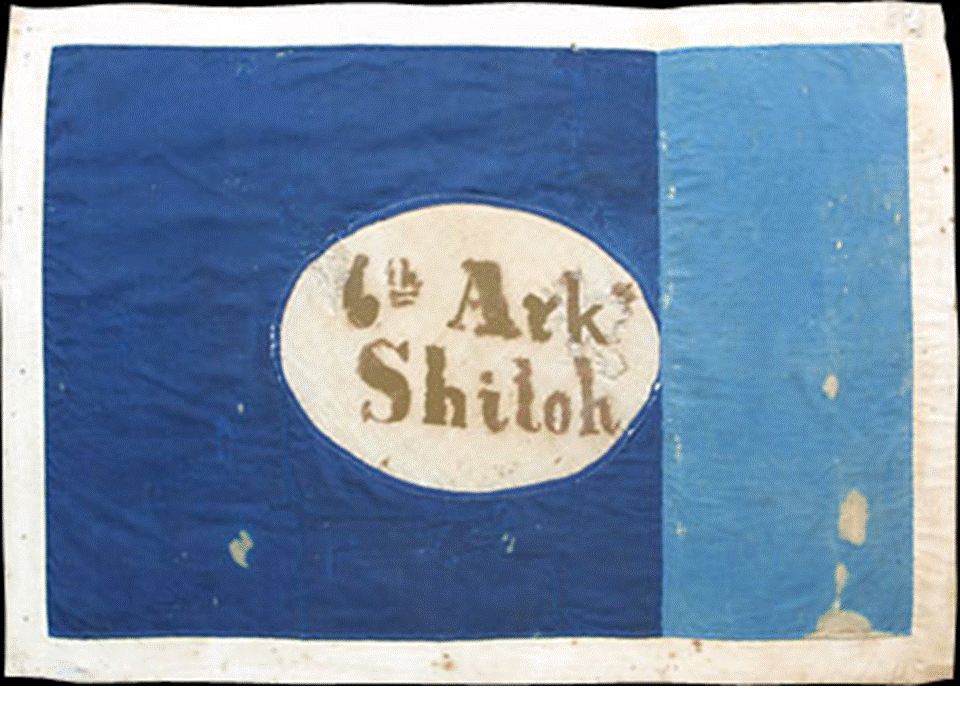
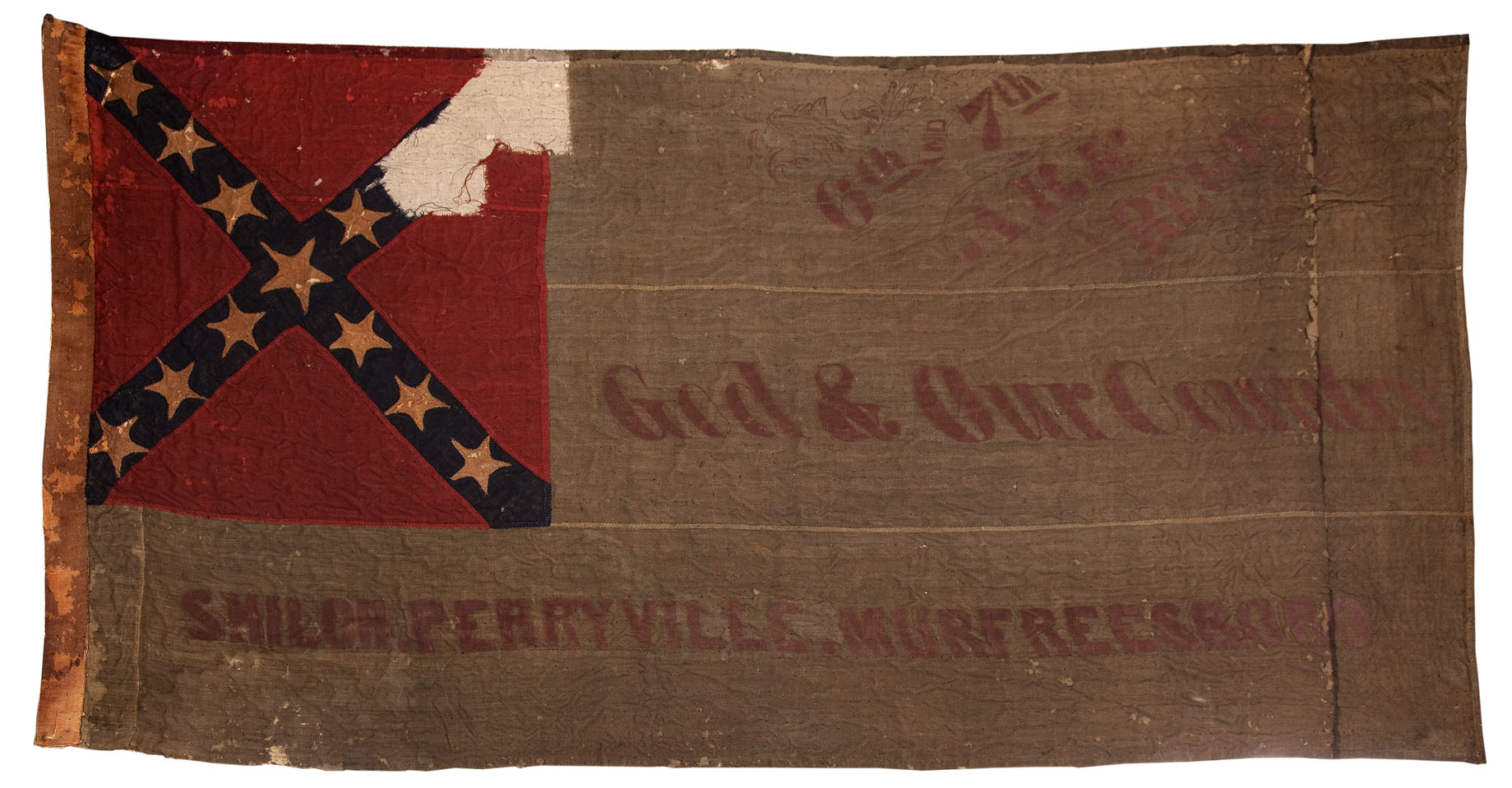
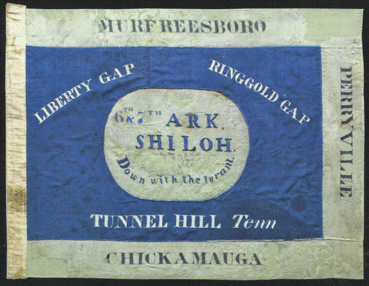
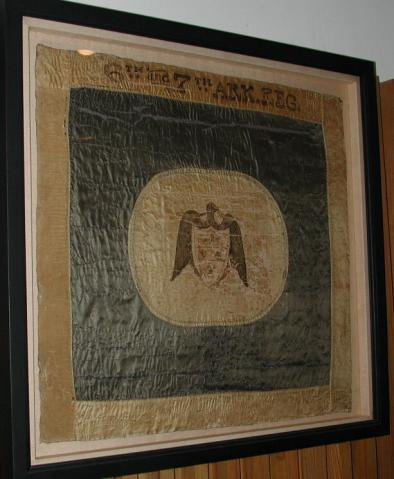
National Color of the Sixth Arkansas	Regimental Color of the Sixth Arkansas	National Color of the 6th and 7th Arkansas	Regimental Color of the 6th and 7th Arkansas	Camp Color of the 6th and 7th Arkansas

== See also ==
- List of Confederate units from Arkansas

== Bibliography ==
- Collier, Calvin L. First In – Last Out, the Capitol Guards, Arkansas Brigade. (Little Rock, AR: Pioneer Press, 1961).
- Thomasson, Bryan. "We Have Drunk From the Same Canteen: Company H, Sixth Arkansas Regiment; the Camden City Guards." Master's thesis, University of Arkansas, 1995.
