= Chew's Arkansas Infantry Battalion =

- Active: 1862
- Country: Confederate States of America
- Allegiance: CSA
- Branch: Infantry
- Engagements: Battle of Prairie Grove, Battle of Helena, Battle of Little Rock, Red River Campaign, Battle of Jenkins Ferry

The Chew's Arkansas Infantry Battalion (1862) was a Confederate Army infantry battalion during the American Civil War. The unit was originally known as Hawthorne's Battalion, but the battalion is most often referred to as Chew's Sharpshooter Battalion. The unit was eventually consolidated with the 39th Arkansas Infantry Regiment.

== Organization ==
On October 19, 1862, at Camp Reagan, Arkansas Colonel A. T. Hawthorne was assigned to the command of an unarmed battalion composed of the companies of Dawson, Tumlinson, Perkins and Hailey and the new unit was referred to as Hawthorn's Battalion Arkansas Volunteers. The four companies that made up Hawthorne's Battalion were:

- Company A - Captain Elbert Dawson's Company (Madison County) Organized September 3, 1862 on King's River, Madison County. Marched thence to Elm Springs and was mustered into service on September 12, 1862, as Arkansas Infantry.
- Company B - Captain Wiley Tumlinson's Company (Scott County) Organized July 4, 1862 and served as cavalry until September 16.
- Company C - Captain B.T. Hailey's Company (Marion, Carroll and Benton Counties) Organized in June, 1862 and served as cavalry until August 24.
- Company D - Captain Samuel W. Perkin's Company (Scott County) Organized in June/July, 1862 and served as cavalry until September 16.

Dawson's Company was the last to be organized and apparently never served as cavalry. The other three companies mentioned above spent approximately two months serving together as cavalry in Gipson's Battalion Mounted Rifles. They were eventually dismounted at the approximate dates mentioned above to serve as infantry. It appears that a portion of Tumlinson's Company was divided and placed into Perkins' Company as two men from the former company show up on the casualty list of Company C at the battle of Prairie Grove.

On Oct 23, 1862 an order to Colonel C. W. Adams, (Adams' Arkansas Infantry Regiment) countermanded a previous order assigning Captain Chew as Lieutenant Colonel of Adams' Regiment "in deference to the wishes of men and officers of the regiment in their memorandum to the Major General commanding."

Two weeks later, Major Hawthorn was elected colonel of the 39th Arkansas Infantry Regiment. On November 3, 1862 Captain Robert E. Chew was appointed major and placed in command of the battalion which then became known as "Chew's Sharpshooter Battalion."

.... assign the senior Captain to the command of the Battalion now commanded by Colonel Hawthorne and move them up when armed. You will notify the Captain commanding that the battalion will be consolidated with Buster's battalion and a regiment formed of the two. The field officers will be appointed hereafter.

On November 5, 1862 an order from Colonel Brooks at Camp Hindman mentioned a "memorial" of the commissioned officers of Hawthorne's Battalion to have Captain Chew appointed Major to fill the vacancy caused by promotion of Major Hawthorne.

It appears that this battalion was a sharpshooter battalion in name only. Had it survived after the battle of Prairie Grove it may have become one in time. Sharpshooters were equipped in the same manner as infantry, with the standard rifle or rifle-musket; some were even armed for a time with smoothbore weapons. There was no difference in the organization of what was called a "sharpshooter battalion" and a regular light infantry battalion. The term "battalion" implies that the unit was organized with fewer than the full ten companies required for a regiment. Tactically, these units were specialists in skirmishing. "Sniping" – at least in the manner we think of it today – was the main purpose of a "sharpshooter" unit. Civil War infantry units received little formal instruction in rifle marksmanship; however, skirmishers were expected to deliver individual, aimed fire at targets of opportunity rather than the massed volleys of the infantry line of battle.

No known roster of the battalion exists. The casualty list of this unit at Prairie Grove did survive as it was published in the True Democrat newspaper in Little Rock on December 31, 1862.

== Service ==
On December 1, 1862 Brigadier General James F. Fagan asked for the consolidation of Major Chew's Arkansas Infantry battalion and Hawthorne's 39th Arkansas Infantry Regiment both of his brigade. While this order was not approved until after the Battle of Prairie Grove, the battalion and Hawthorn's 39th Arkansas Infantry Regiment fought side by side during the battle. It is well documented that all four infantry regiments of Fagan's Brigade sent out their own skirmishers, so Chew's men did not act as skirmishers for the entire brigade. Their primary role was serving as an infantry battalion alongside Hawthorn's Regiment during the fighting at Prairie Grove. In that role, they took part in the charges of Fagan's Brigade driving back the 20th Wisconsin, 19th Iowa, and 37th Illinois and 26th Indiana regiments when these Union troops ascended the ridge.

On the day of the Battle of Prairie Grove, only one of the original company commanders was present. The other three are absent, most likely due to illness. At the time of the battle on December 7, the battalion's command was as follows:

- Major Robert E. Chew, commanding:
- Company A- 1st Lieutenant Willis Greenlee
- Company B- 1st Lieutenant Jacob C. Moles
- Company C- Captain Samuel W. Perkins
- Company D- Lieutenant Samuel L. Hayhurst (specific rank not noted, probably 1st lieutenant)

Major Robert E. Chew, was killed during the Battle of Prairie Grove. He was born circa 1822 in Virginia, the son of John Winslow and Ann Thornton (Voss) Chew. The family moved to Humphrey Co., Tennessee and by 1850 they were living in Fayetteville, Arkansas. In the census of that year the father was listed as the postmaster and Robert, 28, was listed as a farmer. Robert's father died in 1855 and at some point the family moved away probably to Missouri. A query in the Confederate Veteran magazine by Chew's nephew stated that his uncle belonged to a Tennessee regiment and was killed at Prairie Grove. The nephew said he was told that his uncle's sword and watch had been recovered from his body and was hoping these items could be reunited with the family. Chew had, in fact, served as a captain in Company H, 2nd Tennessee Infantry (Col. J. Knox Walker commanding). This regiment was formed entirely in Memphis, so Robert apparently had moved to this city sometime before the war started. The Official Records mentioned that Capt. Chew had assisted in the recapture of an artillery piece at the battle of Belmont, Missouri. At Shiloh the 2nd Tennessee Infantry suffered severe casualties and afterwards was consolidated into four companies. This left Captain Chew without a company to command. Apparently through Arkansas connections, he managed to get transferred back across the river to serve as a staff officer for Gen. Thomas C. Hindman. In that capacity, late in September, 1862, he met face to face with General William T. Sherman when he hand delivered a letter to him from General Hindman and returned with a reply. Sometime in October November, 1862 Robert Chew received a promotion to major and was given the assignment of commanding his own sharpshooter battalion. Adding up the numbers in the casualty list that appeared in the True Democrat, Chew's Battalion went into action with 12 officers and 104 enlisted men. They suffered 3 killed, 22 wounded (five of them mortally), and 5 missing for a total loss of 30.

=== Consolidation with Hawthorn's Regiment ===
On December 14, 1862, Major General Thomas C. Hindman endorsed General Fagan's request to consolidate Chew's Battalion and Hathorn's 39th Arkansas Infantry:

Chew's Battalion consists of four companies and had been selected as a Battalion of sharpshooters. I assigned Major Chew to the command of it sometime ago. In the late battle of Prairie Grove the Battalion acted with and as a part of Hawthorne's regiment, and Major Chew was killed.....Hawthorne's Regiment is much reduced and the Battalion if attached to any Regiment would probably prefer this one due to prior service together.

earnestly recommended-

TCH

Major General Hindman mentioned the battalion again on December 23, 1862 in a letter to General Theophilus Hunter Holmes:

In Fagan's command there is a battalion of five companies formerly commanded by Major Chew, which I organized as a Battalion of sharp shooters. It acted with and as a part of Hawthorns Regiment in the recent battle and Chew was killed, and as Hawthorne Regiment is much reduced and the men of Chew's Battalion would prefer to go to that Regiment, I ask that the Battalion and Regiment be consolidated.

Chew's Battalion was consolidated into Hawthorn's Regiment in the following manner:

- Company A, Chew's Battalion became Company G, Hawthorn's 39th Arkansas Infantry Regiment.
- Company B, Chew's Battalion became Company K, Hawthorn's 39th Arkansas Infantry Regiment. It appears this also included the members of Tumlinson's Company who had gone over to Perkin's Company. They rejoined their former company and became part of Company K.
- Companies C and D, Chew's Battalion became Company H, Hawthorn's 39th Arkansas Infantry Regiment. Captain Samuel W. Perkins was apparently forced out by this consolidation and does not appear on the roster of Hawthorn's Regiment.

From its initial service as Chew's Battalion through its consolidation with the 39th Arkansas Infantry, its members participated in the following engagements:

- Battle of Prairie Grove, Arkansas, December 7, 1862
- Battle of Helena, Arkansas July 4, 1863
- Battle of Little Rock, Arkansas, September 10, 1863
- Red River Campaign, Arkansas March–May, 1864
- Battle of Jenkins Ferry, Arkansas April 30, 1864

== Surrender ==
The survivors of Chew's Battalion surrendered with the remnants of the 39th Arkansas Infantry Regiment and the rest of the Department of the Trans-Mississippi at Marshall, Texas on May 26, 1865.

== See also ==
- List of Confederate units from Arkansas
- Confederate Units by State
