= Army of the Trans-Mississippi =

Field army of the Confederate States

Army of Trans-Mississippi
- Flag
- Active: 1862–1865
- Disbanded: May 26, 1865
- Country: Confederate States
- Branch: Army
- Size: Field army
- Part of: Trans-Mississippi Department
- Headquarters: Little Rock, Arkansas (1862–63); Shreveport, Louisiana (1863–65); Houston, Texas (May 1865)
- Wars: American Civil War; Trans-Mississippi Theater

Commanders
- Notable commanders: Edmund Kirby Smith

The Army of Trans-Mississippi was a field army of the Confederate States Army in the Trans-Mississippi theater of the American Civil War. It was the last major Confederate command to surrender, submitting on May 26, 1865, exactly one month after General Johnston had surrendered in the eastern United States.

== Background ==
The Trans-Mississippi Department separated from the Western Department of the Confederate States Army on May 26, 1862. It consisted primarily of the three Confederate states west of the Mississippi (Texas, Louisiana, and Arkansas), the contested state of Missouri, and two Confederate territories—the Indian Territory and Confederate Arizona (roughly corresponding to the present-day states of Oklahoma, New Mexico, and Arizona). The command of the area was given to Major-General T. H. Holmes. It was the operational theater for many quasi-independent forces, including Quantrill's Raiders and the Missouri Bushwhackers.

== History ==
The Army of Trans-Mississippi originally numbered well over 50,000 troops, but fewer than 43,000 were available by the end of the war. Major campaigns included Sibley's New Mexico campaign, Banks' Red River campaign, and Price's Missouri campaign. The last battle of the Civil War, the Battle of Palmito Ranch, was fought May 12–13, 1865, by units of the Trans-Mississippi Army.

General E. Kirby Smith, who commanded the Army, surrendered to Union forces on May 26, 1865, although by that point many of his troops had already deserted. The last remaining Trans-Mississippi Army force—and also the last remaining Confederate force—was the 1st Cherokee Mounted Rifles, commanded by Brigadier-General Stand Watie. Watie surrendered on June 23.

== Organization ==
- Third Corps, ATM (Headquartered at Shreveport, Department of Louisiana)

This corps was organized under the command of Simon Bolivar Buckner

- Second Corps, ATM (Department of Arkansas and Missouri)

This corps was organized on August 4, 1864, under the command of John B. Magruder.

- Third Corps, ATM (Headquartered at Galveston, Department of Texas)

This corps was organized on August 4, 1864, under the command of John George Walker.

- Cavalry Corps, ATM

The Cavalry Corps was organized on August 4, 1864, under the command of Sterling Price.

- Reserve Corps, ATM

The Reserve Corps was established on September 10, 1864, to support the Trans-Mississippi Army.
