= Alexander T. Hawthorn =

Confederate States Army general

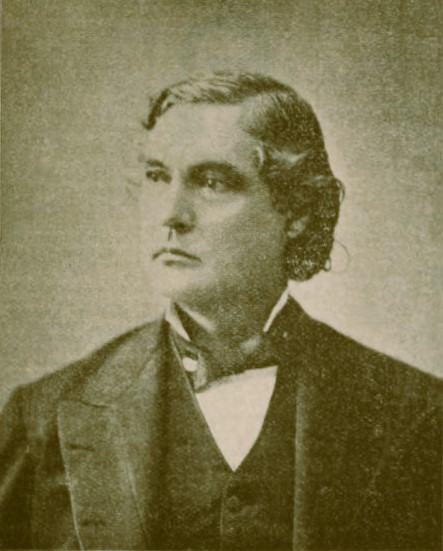
- Hawthorn, before 1861
- Born: Alexander Travis Hawthorn; January 10, 1825; Conecuh County, Alabama, U.S.
- Died: May 31, 1899 (aged 74); Dallas, Texas, U.S.
- Burial place: Greenwood Cemetery, Marshall, Texas, U.S. 32°33′14.5″N 94°22′34.7″W
- Spouse: Anna Medley (m. 1850)
- Children: 3
- Military career
- Allegiance: United States; Confederate States
- Branch: United States Volunteers; Confederate States Army
- Service years: 1847–1848 (U.S.); 1861–1865 (C.S.)
- Rank: First Lieutenant (U.S.); Brigadier General (C.S.)
- Commands: 6th Arkansas Infantry Regiment (1861–62); 39th Arkansas Infantry Regiment (1862–64); 4th Arkansas Infantry Brigade (1864–65)
- Battles: Mexican–American War; American Civil War; Battle of Shiloh (WIA); Battle of Perryville; Battle of Prairie Grove; Battle of Helena; Battle of Mansfield; Battle of Pleasant Hill; Battle of Jenkins' Ferry

Alexander Travis Hawthorn (January 10, 1825 – May 31, 1899) was a senior officer of the Confederate States Army who commanded infantry in the Western and Trans-Mississippi theaters of the American Civil War. After the war, in company with a party of friends, he traveled extensively in Brazil as the guest of the imperial government, the policy of the government being to encourage immigration from the Southern States. In 1880, he was ordained a minister of the Baptist Church.

== Early life and education ==
Hawthorn was born on January 10, 1825, in Conecuh County, Alabama, and educated at Evergreen Academy and Mercer University. He then studied law at Yale University, from 1846 to 1847, relocating to Camden, Arkansas, where he commenced the practice of law.

== American Civil War ==
When the 6th Arkansas Infantry Regiment was organized in 1861, Hawthorn was elected lieutenant colonel and then, the following spring, was appointed its colonel. He was wounded at Shiloh and, in 1863, took a gallant part in the assault on Hindman Hill during the attack on Helena. During the Spring 1864 Red River Campaign and Battle of Jenkins' Ferry, he commanded the 4th Arkansas Infantry Brigade of the 1st Arkansas Infantry Division. Meanwhile, Hawthorn had been promoted brigadier general to date from February 18, 1863. He remained with the division until May 1865.

== Later life ==
Hawthorn traveled to Brazil in 1867, but returned in 1874 and engaged in business in New Orleans. Six years later he entered the Baptist ministry and was ordained, after which he lived in Texas until his death on May 31, 1899, at Dallas. He is buried in Greenwood Cemetery at Marshall, Texas.

== See also ==
- List of Confederate States Army generals
- List of Mercer University alumni
- List of people from Alabama
- List of Yale Law School alumni

Military offices
Preceded by Colonel Richard Lyon	Commanding officer of the 6th Arkansas Infantry Regiment; 1861–1862	Succeeded by Lieutenant-Colonel Gordon N. Peay; Acting
Preceded by Colonel Albert W. Johnson	Commanding officer of the 39th Arkansas Infantry Regiment; 1862–1864	Succeeded by Colonel John B. Cocke
Preceded by James F. Fagan	Commanding officer of the 4th Arkansas Infantry Brigade; 1864–1865	Command disbanded
