= 35th Arkansas Infantry Regiment =

Infantry regiment of the Confederate States Army

- Active: 1862–1865
- Country: Confederate States
- Allegiance: Arkansas
- Branch: Army
- Type: Infantry
- Size: Regiment
- Facings: Light blue
- Battles: American Civil War; Battle of Pea Ridge; Battle of Prairie Grove; Battle of Helena; Battle of Mansfield; Battle of Pleasant Hill; Battle of Jenkins Ferry

The 35th Arkansas Infantry Regiment (also known as the 1st Arkansas Infantry Regiment, the 22nd Arkansas Infantry Regiment, "King's regiment," "McCord's regiment," and "Rector's regiment") was an infantry formation of the Confederate States Army in the Trans-Mississippi Theater of the American Civil War.

== Formation ==
35th Arkansas Infantry Regiment was organized during the summer of 1862 and later redesignated as the 22nd Arkansas Infantry Regiment. It was organized from remnants of the 17th (Griffiths) Arkansas Infantry Regiment and former Militia members who enlisted in the summer of 1862. It was also known as the 1st (Rector's War Regiment) Arkansas Infantry. The unit was placed in Fagan's and A. T. Hawthorne's Brigade, Trans-Mississippi Department. Its commanding officers were Colonels Frank Rector, James P. King and Henry J. McCord, Lieutenant Colonel John W. Wallace, and Majors John J. Dillard and Mark T. Tatum.

== History ==
Under the command of Colonel James P. King, the 35th Arkansas fought at the Battle of Bayou Fourche and the Battle of Helena where it reported 75 casualties. Later, under the command of Colonel Henry J. McCord, the unit saw action at the Battle of Jenkins' Ferry.

== See also ==
- List of Confederate units from Arkansas
- Confederate Units by State
