= James Fleming Fagan =

Confederate States Army general

James F. Fagan
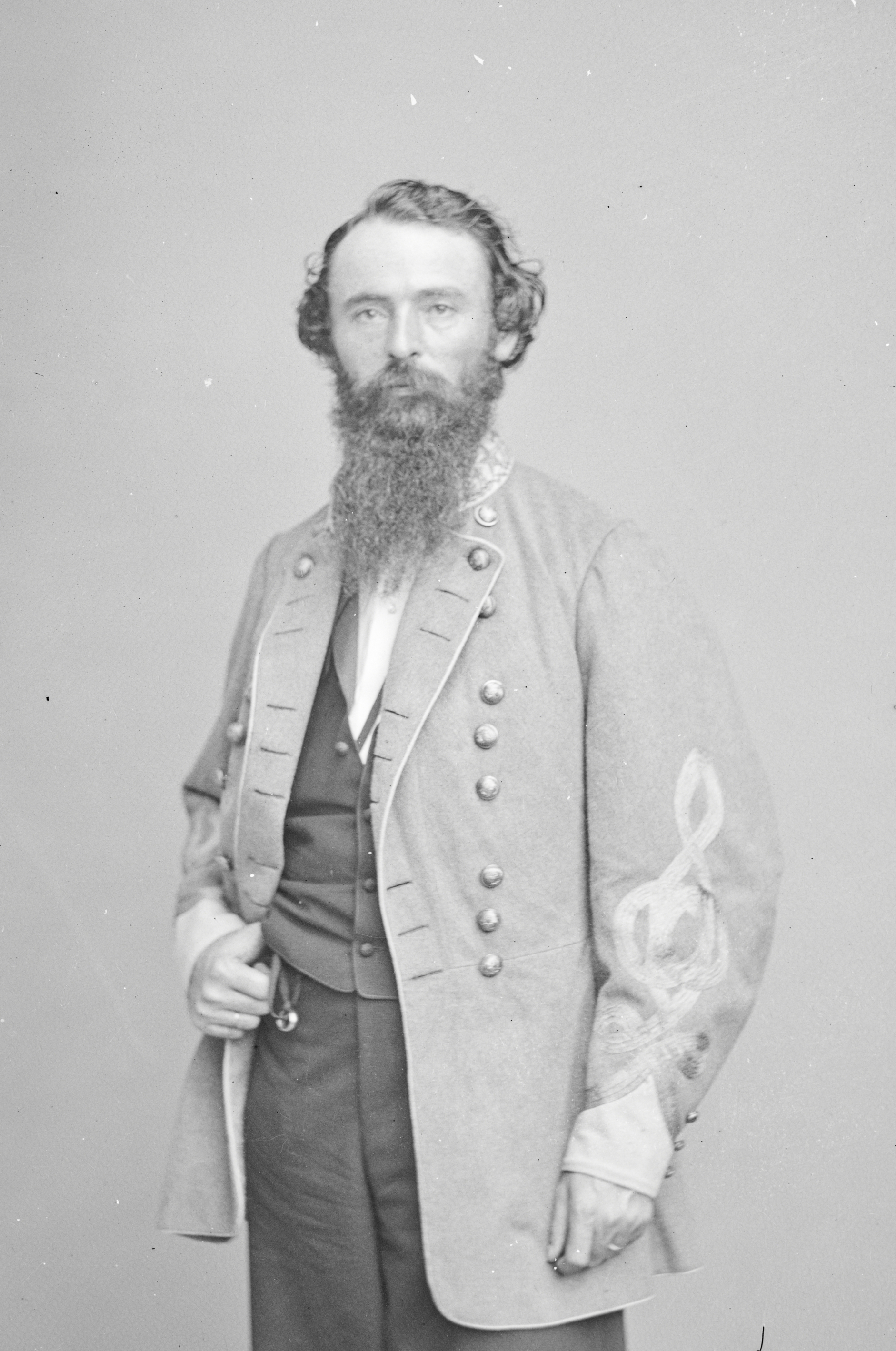
- Fagan in uniform, taken by Mathew Brady

Member of the Arkansas Senate from Hot Spring, Montgomery and Saline counties
- In office November 5, 1860 – November 3, 1862
- Preceded by: W. H. Hammond
- Succeeded by: F. Leach

Member of the Arkansas House of Representatives from Saline County
- In office November 1, 1852 – November 6, 1854
- Preceded by: J. M. Willis; D. Dodd
- Succeeded by: A. R. Hockersmith

Personal details
- Born: James Fleming Fagan; March 1, 1828 Clark County, Kentucky, U.S.
- Died: September 1, 1893 (aged 65) Little Rock, Arkansas, U.S.
- Cause of death: Malaria
- Resting place: Mount Holly Cemetery, Little Rock, Arkansas, U.S. 34°44′15.3″N 92°16′42.5″W
- Party: American Party (from 1856)
- Other political affiliations: Whig (until 1856)
- Spouses: Mura Elisiff Beall (m. 1851; died 1870) Elizabeth Mildred Ora Rapley (m. 1873)
- Relations: Samuel Adams (stepfather)
- Children: 5

Military service
- Allegiance: United States; Confederate States
- Service: United States Volunteers; Confederate States Army
- Years of service: 1847 (U.S.); 1861–1865 (C.S.)
- Rank: Second Lieutenant (U.S.); Major-General (C.S.)
- Unit: Company C, Arkansas Mounted Infantry Regiment
- Commands: 1st Arkansas Infantry Regiment; 1st Arkansas Cavalry Regiment; Fagan's Brigade; Fagan's Cavalry Division; District of Arkansas
- Battles: Mexican–American War; Battle of Buena Vista; American Civil War; Battle of Shiloh; Siege of Corinth; Battle of Cane Hill; Battle of Prairie Grove; Battle of Helena; Little Rock Campaign; Battle of Marks' Mills; Battle of Pilot Knob; Battle of Mine Creek

James Fleming Fagan (March 1, 1828 – September 1, 1893) was an American farmer, politician, and senior officer of the Confederate States Army during the American Civil War. His brigade distinguished itself in the Camden Expedition of 1864, helping to drive the U.S. Army's Seventh Corps from southwest Arkansas.

== Early life ==
James Fleming Fagan was born in Clark County, Kentucky. When he was ten years old, his family moved to Little Rock. His father had been hired to work on the Arkansas State House. His father died during his youth and his mother, Catherine A. Fagan, in 1842 married Samuel Adams, who became acting governor of Arkansas two years later. After his stepfather's death, Fagan took control of the family farm along the Saline River in southern Arkansas. Though he was a member of the Whig Party, he represented the heavily Democratic Saline County for two terms in the General Assembly. Fagan served in the United States Volunteers during the Mexican–American War with Company C, Arkansas Mounted Infantry Regiment, under Colonel Archibald Yell and was promoted to the rank of second lieutenant.

== American Civil War ==
At the start of the American Civil War, Fagan raised a company for the Confederate States Army and became its captain. When his unit was folded in with the 1st Arkansas Infantry Regiment on May 6, 1861, the very day that Arkansas seceded from the Union, he was elected as colonel of the combined 900-man regiment. They were formally mustered into service in Lynchburg, Virginia in May 1861. His regiment was a part of the first wave of Confederate attacks under General Albert Sidney Johnston at the Battle of Shiloh. He also participated in the Siege of Corinth, but fell into disfavor with his superior officer, General Braxton Bragg.

Fagan was soon transferred to the Trans-Mississippi Theater, where he fought at the battles of Cane Hill and Prairie Grove in command of the 1st Arkansas Cavalry Regiment. He was promoted to brigadier-general on September 12, 1862, and assumed command of a brigade composed of the 34th Arkansas, 35th Arkansas, 37th Arkansas, and Hawthorn's Arkansas infantry regiments. Fagan played a central role in the Battle of Helena, where he and his Arkansas brigade made repeated frontal assaults on United States artillery batteries. During the Little Rock Campaign, Fagan was given temporary command of Sterling Price's division.

Fagan fought in the Camden Expedition, including the successful destruction of a Federal supply train at the Battle of Marks' Mills, which led to the Federal retreat from southern Arkansas. In recognition for his service in the Camden Expedition, he was promoted to major-general on April 24, 1864, and commanded the Arkansas division of Confederate cavalry during Price's Missouri Expedition. His division broke in a "disgraceful manner" during the failed assault on Fort Davidson at Pilot Knob, Missouri. During Price's withdrawal from Missouri and Kansas, Fagan and John S. Marmaduke's divisions were overwhelmed at the Battle of Mine Creek. The end of the war found Fagan in command of the District of Arkansas of the Trans-Mississippi Department, which was active militarily until late April 1865.

== Later life ==
Fagan was paroled by United States military authorities on June 20, 1865. After his parole, he returned to his farm to make a living. Fagan commanded Joseph Brooks' militia forces during the so-called Brooks-Baxter War of 1874, despite Fagan's former service as a Confederate States Army general.

He was appointed United States Marshal by President Ulysses S. Grant in 1875, working for "Hanging Judge" Parker. In this capacity, Fagan recruited Bass Reeves as the first black deputy marshal to work west of the Mississippi River.

He served as a receiver for the United States Land Office in 1877. In 1890, Fagan ran for the office of state railroad commissioner but was defeated. He died of malaria in Little Rock, Arkansas, and was buried at the historic Mount Holly Cemetery in that city.

== Personal life ==
Fagan's first wife was the sister of Confederate States Army general William N. R. Beall. He was also related by marriage to Arkansas governor Henry M. Rector.

== Legacy ==
Chapter No. 280 of the Military Order of the Stars and Bars in Jonesboro, Arkansas, was named after him.

== See also ==
- List of Confederate States Army generals

Arkansas House of Representatives
Preceded by J. M. Willis; D. Dodd	Member of the Arkansas House of Representatives from Saline County; 1852–1854	Succeeded by A. R. Hockersmith
Arkansas Senate
Preceded by W. H. Hammond	Member of the Arkansas Senate from Hot Spring, Montgomery and Saline counties 1860–1862	Succeeded by F. Leach
