= 7th Missouri Cavalry Regiment =

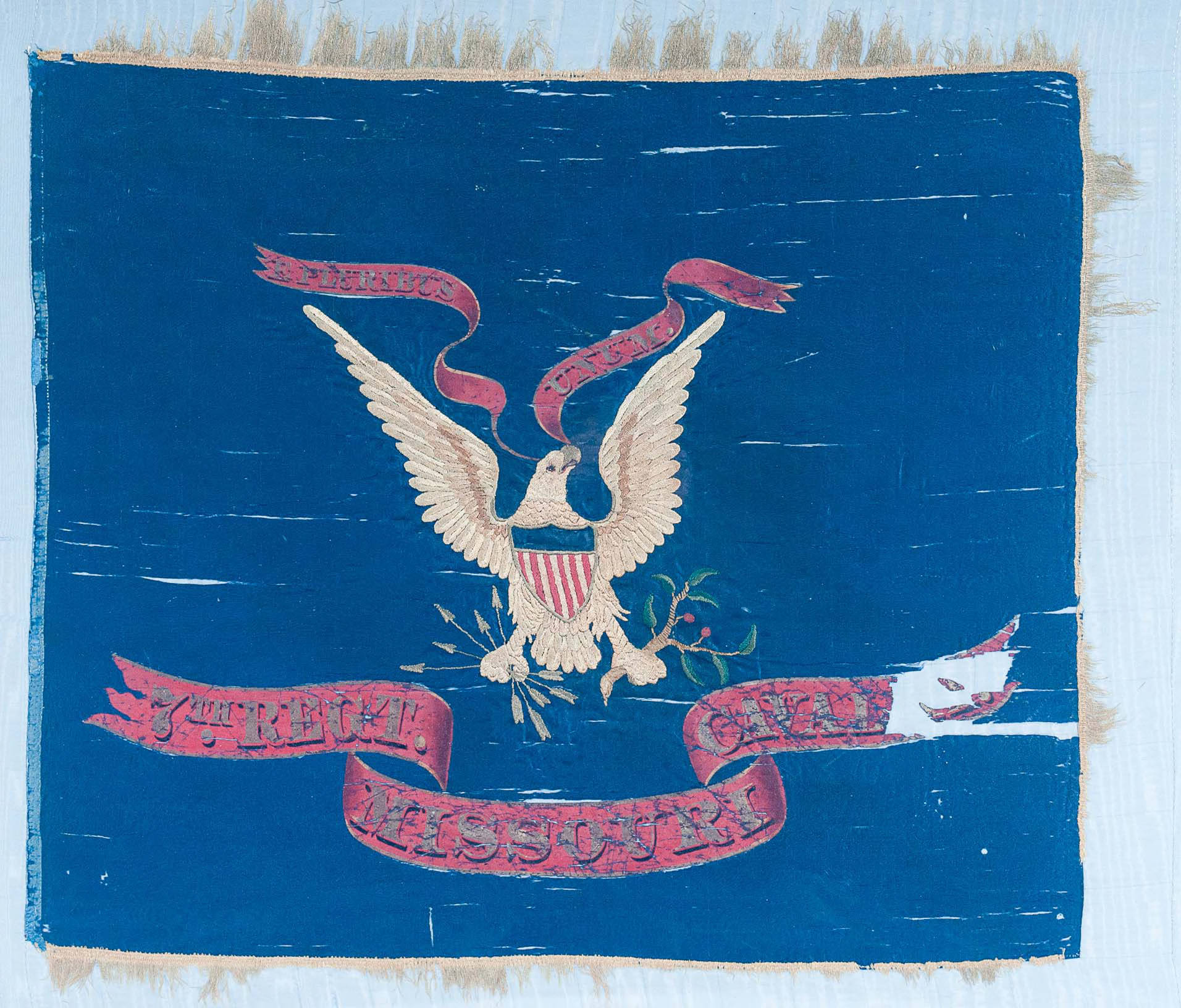
- Regimental flag of the 7th Missouri Cavalry
- Active: 20 Feb. 1862 – 22 Feb. 1865
- Country: United States
- Allegiance: (United States) Union; Missouri
- Branch: Union Army
- Type: Cavalry
- Size: Regiment
- Nickname: Blackhawk Cavalry
- Engagements: American Civil War; First Battle of Independence (1862); Battle of Lone Jack (1862); Battle of Prairie Grove (1862); Battle of Van Buren (1862); Battle of Brownsville (1863); Skirmish at Ashley's Mills (1863); Battle of Bayou Fourche (1863); Camden Expedition (1864); Battle of Mount Elba (1864); Battle of Marks' Mills (1864)

Commanders
- Notable commanders: Daniel Huston Jr. Eliphalet Bredett †

7th Missouri Cavalry Regiment was a cavalry unit from Missouri that served in the Union Army during the American Civil War. The regiment was formed on 20 February 1862 by merging Bishop's Cavalry Battalion (also known as the Blackhawk Cavalry, which had formed on 14 November 1861) with some unattached cavalry companies. The regiment fought at Independence, Lone Jack, Prairie Grove and Van Buren in 1862. The unit participated in Frederick Steele's expedition to Little Rock in 1863, fighting at Brownsville, Ashley's Mills, and Bayou Fourche. In 1864, the regiment went on the Camden Expedition and fought at Mount Elba and Marks' Mills. The remaining soldiers were consolidated with the 1st Missouri Cavalry Regiment on 22 February 1865.

== Formation ==
The 7th Missouri Cavalry Regiment was formed on 20 February 1862 by consolidating the Blackhawk Cavalry, also known as Bishop's Cavalry Battalion, with several unattached cavalry companies. The Blackhawk Cavalry organized at Henderson and Laclede, Missouri (Camp Morgan) between 14 November and 31 December 1861. After transfer into the 7th Missouri Cavalry, the Blackhawk Cavalry became Companies A–G and K. Captain Nathan A. Winters' company formed at Kirksville, Macon, and Sedalia, Missouri and became Company H. Captain Foster R. Hawk's company formed from July 1861 to January 1862 and became Company I on 25 February 1862. Captain Benjamin T. Humphrey's company formed at Laclede on 14 November 1861 and became Company M on 7 March 1862. Captain Wesley R. Love's company formed on 14 November 1861 and became Company D (or L). Typically, a cavalry regiment consisted of 12 companies named A through M, not including J. (Note: Source stated that Love's company was Company D. This appears to be a typographical error for Company L which is missing from the normal list of 12 companies.)

Colonel Daniel Huston Jr. assumed command of the 7th Missouri Cavalry. The other field officers were Lieutenant Colonel William Bishop and Majors Andrew H. Linder and David McKee. Bishop was discharged on 3 April 1862 and replaced by Lieutenant Colonel James T. Buel. Buel was discharged on 25 August 1862 and replaced by Lieutenant Colonel John L. Chandler. Eliphalet Bredett was promoted major on 29 March 1862. Linder resigned on 22 September 1862, Bredett was killed in action on 7 December 1862, and McKee resigned on 21 July 1863. Their replacements were Majors Milton H. Brawner on 1 January 1863 and Henry P. Spellman on 20 February 1863. Huston graduated from the United States Military Academy and had 12 years experience serving in the US Army.

Original Company Officers, 7th Missouri Cavalry Regiment
Company	Captain	To Rank From
A	Milton H. Brawner	5 July 1861
B	Eliphalet Bredett	15 August 1861
C	Henry P. Spellman	18 August 1861
D	William McKee	10 September 1861
E	George Rockwell	12 September 1861
F	Thomas C. Miller	28 August 1861
G	William A. Martin	26 September 1861
H	Nathan A. Winters	15 October 1861
I	Foster R. Hawks	15 October 1861
K	Fred C. Loring	18 June 1861
L	Wesley R. Love	24 July 1861
M	Benjamin T. Humphrey	11 July 1861

== History ==
=== Before consolidation ===
The Blackhawk Cavalry was assigned to duty in northeast Missouri. Humphrey's independent (Company M) cavalry fought at Spring Hill on 27 October 1861. The Blackhawk Cavalry took part in an expedition to Milford, Missouri on 15–19 December. The battalion was at Shawnee Mound or Milford on 18 December and a detachment was at Hudson, Missouri on 21 December.

=== Independence and Lone Jack ===
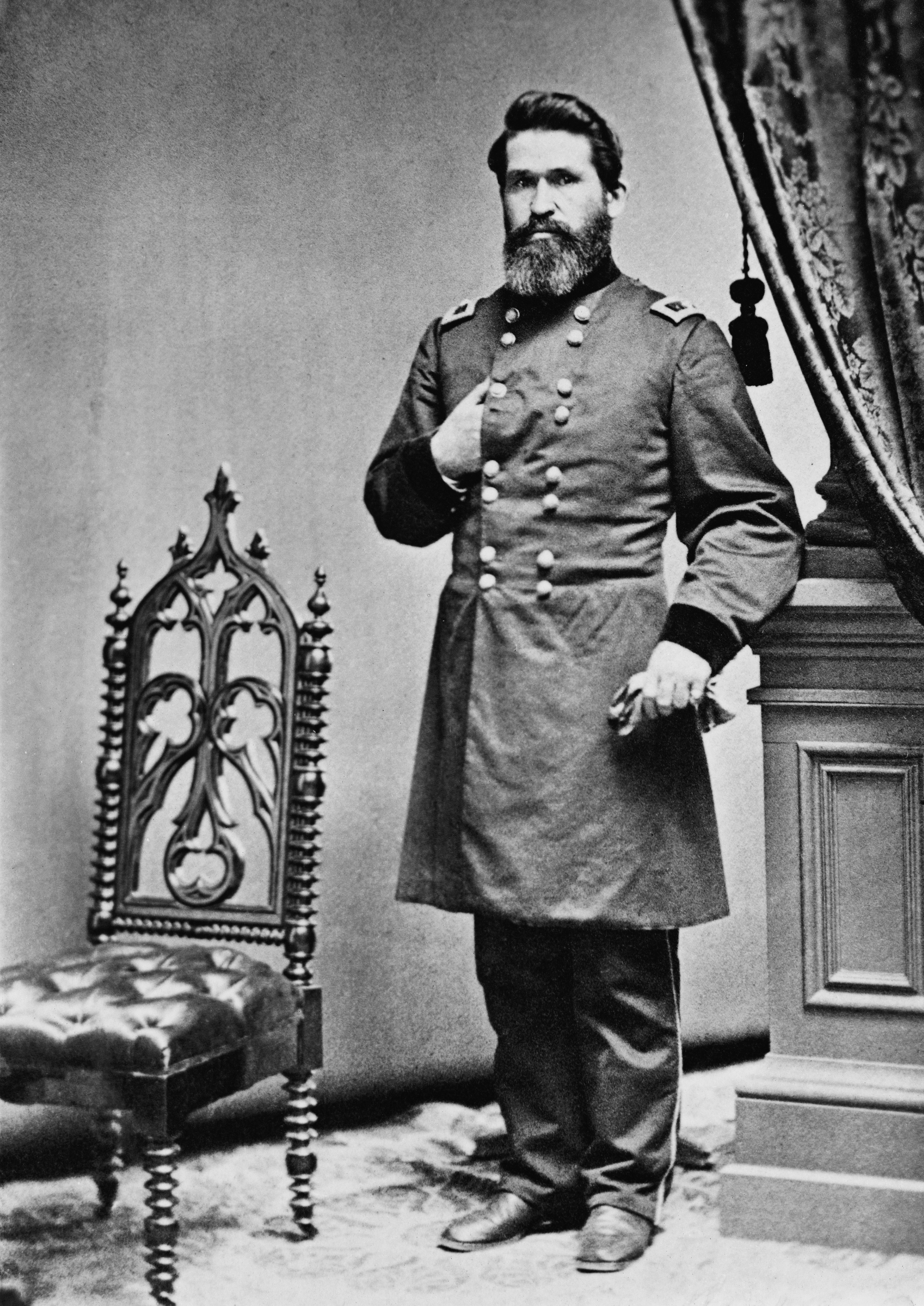
James G. Blunt

After being organized on 20 February 1862, the 7th Missouri Cavalry was attached to Department of Kansas until June 1862. During this period, the regiment participated in operations near Miami and Waverly, Missouri on 25–28 May. The regiment was assigned to the District of Southwest Missouri, Department of Missouri in June–October 1862. Companies H and I took part in a reconnaissance to Miami, Waverly, Franklin, and Pink Hill, Missouri on 4–10 June. A detachment fought a skirmish at Pink Hill on 11 June. Company B was in action at Raytown, Missouri on 23 June. Companies B, D, F, and K were in operations at Pink Hill and Sibley, Missouri from 28 June to 1 July. The regiment took part in expeditions in Cass County on 9–11 July, including at Wadesburg near Creighton. The unit skirmished at Columbus, Missouri on 23 July.

At the First Battle of Independence on 11 August 1862, Buel commanded about 350 Union soldiers, including a detachment of the 7th Missouri Cavalry. Buel's troops were deployed at the bank, jailhouse, and a field camp. Approximately 800 Confederates and bushwhackers under John T. Hughes, Upton Hays, Gideon W. Thompson, and William Quantrill surprised the Federals at dawn, driving off the troops at the jail and surrounding Buel at the bank building. The attackers overran the camp, but when they turned aside to loot the tents, the Federals rallied behind a nearby stone wall. Hughes was killed while directing the attack on the stone wall and a stalemate resulted. Buel and his soldiers continued to hold out at the bank until Quantrill threatened to burn down the building. Fearful of being massacred by Quantrill's men, Buel insisted on surrendering his entire force to Thompson with the promise that they would be treated as prisoners of war. Buel's surrender was accepted and the Confederates honored it, paroling the survivors. Union losses were 14 killed, 18 wounded, and 312 captured, while Confederate casualties numbered 32. Buel faced a court-martial for cowardice and conspiracy and was dismissed from service.

Shocked by the bold attack on Independence, Union forces converged on the area in an attempt to drive out the Confederates and bushwhackers. Emory S. Foster led an 800-man column of Federal troops from Lexington, Missouri. They were supposed to cooperate with Fitz Henry Warren with 500 Union soldiers from Clinton, Missouri and James G. Blunt with a 2,500-strong column from Fort Scott, Kansas. Foster's column included Captain Brawner and 265 men of the 7th Missouri Cavalry in Companies A, C, E, F, and I. The other units were two guns of the 3rd Independent Battery Indiana Light Artillery and several units of Missouri militia cavalry. Foster's troops arrived in Lone Jack, Missouri on the evening of 15 August, unaware that the other two columns were still distant. In the Battle of Lone Jack on 16 August, Foster's soldiers were attacked at dawn by over 1,500 Confederates. Having heard that the bushwhackers gave no quarter, Foster's soldiers fought desperately until late afternoon. The possession of the two Union artillery pieces changed hands several times before the Union soldiers finally abandoned the town. In the 7th Missouri Cavalry, one second lieutenant was killed in action while another died of his wounds five days later.

=== Prairie Grove ===
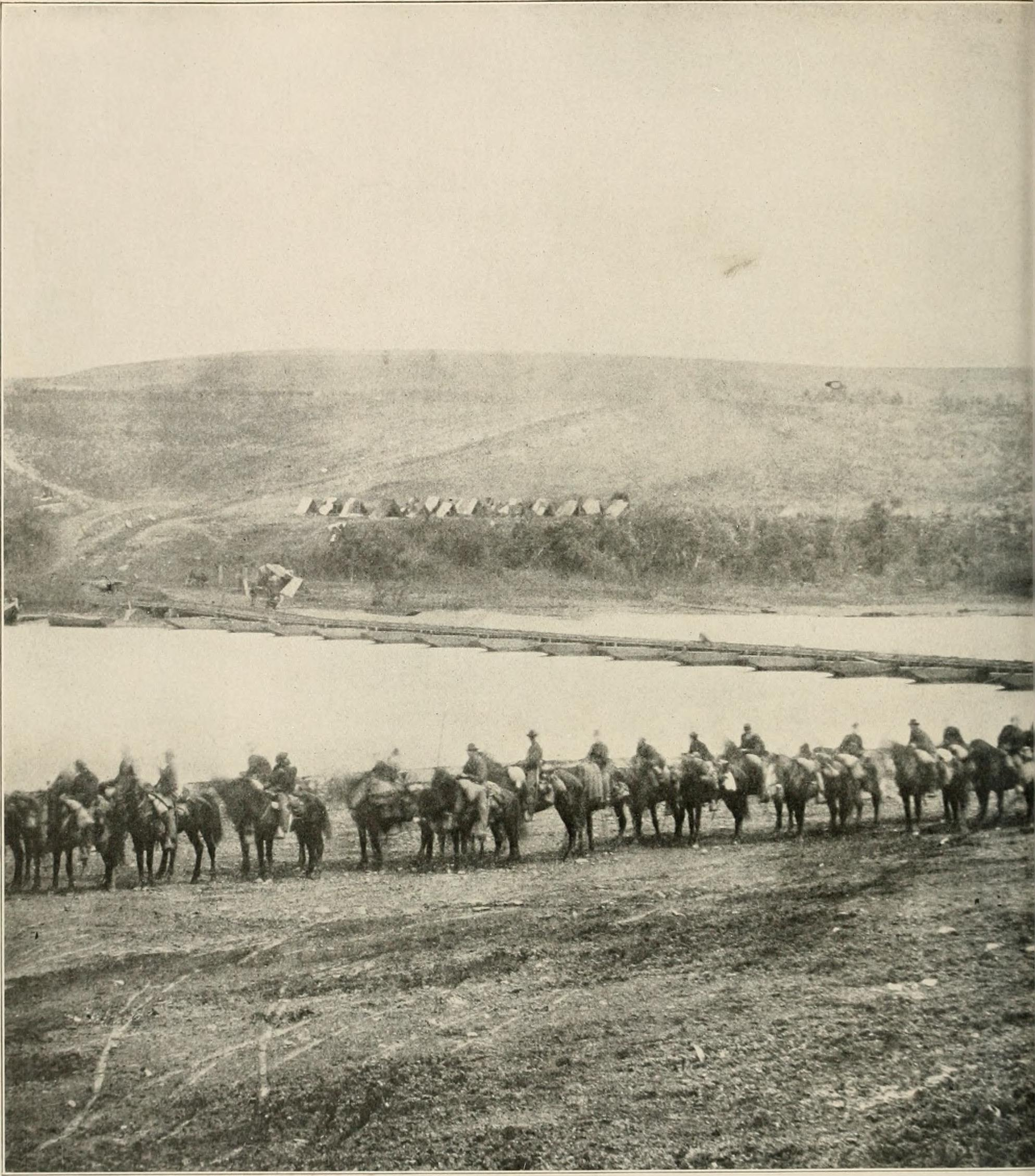
Union cavalry in column of march

From October 1862 to June 1863, the 7th Missouri Cavalry became part of the 1st Brigade, 2nd Division, Army of the Frontier. On 4 October, the regiment took part in the occupation of Newtonia, Missouri. When the Army of the Frontier entered Arkansas on 17 October, many soldiers in the regiment protested that their terms of enlistment prohibited them from serving outside Missouri. Colonel Huston appealed to the men "in the name of God and patriotism and the state of Missouri" to perform their duty, but a body of troopers still resisted. Four companies of the 20th Wisconsin Infantry were summoned and, in the face of this threat, the soldiers finally consented to serve in Arkansas. After a night march on 27–28 October, the 7th Missouri Cavalry and other 2nd Division units occupied Fayetteville, Arkansas. On 4 November, the Army of the Frontier left Arkansas and returned to Missouri.

At the Battle of Prairie Grove on 7 December 1862, the regiment was part of John G. Clark's 1st Brigade in the 2nd Division. James Totten led the 2nd Division, but on 27 November he was called away to be a witness on a court-martial in St Louis. The 7th Missouri Cavalry's Colonel Huston assumed command since he was the 2nd Division's ranking officer. The soldiers cheered the change in commanders because of Totten's drunken and surly behavior. Starting on the morning of 4 December, the 2nd Division force marched 105 mi (169 km) on bad roads in bitterly cold weather in response to Blunt's appeal for reinforcements. When Blunt requested cavalry, Francis J. Herron (3rd Division and overall commander) formed 1,600 of his cavalry into a provisional brigade under Dudley Wickersham and sent it ahead of the infantry on 6 December. Herron also ordered Major Bredett to take 650 troopers and follow Wickersham. Bredett set out with two battalions of the 7th Missouri Cavalry and one battalion of the 6th Missouri Volunteer Cavalry.

Bredett's force camped 3 mi (4.8 km) southwest of Fayetteville and marched before sunrise on 7 December. Near Prairie Grove, Bredett called a halt and the troopers dismounted and began preparing breakfast. Unknown to the hapless Union cavalrymen, Thomas C. Hindman's army bypassed Blunt's division and marched north to crush Herron's approaching force. Scouts quickly detected Bredett's column and Confederate cavalry division commander John S. Marmaduke assigned the brigades of Joseph O. Shelby and Emmett MacDonald to attack. At dawn, Shelby's 450 troopers, many of them in captured blue uniforms, swooped down on Bredett's surprised cavalrymen. Bredett lopped off one Confederate's head with his saber, but he was soon killed. In the confusion, many of the cavalrymen ran toward the Confederates and were killed or captured. Captain Brawner took command but most of the survivors fled through the ranks of the 1st Arkansas Cavalry Regiment (Union). Soon MacDonald's brigade crashed into the 1st Arkansas and it also fled. The Confederate pursuit ended when their horses became exhausted and Herron's infantry appeared. Captain William McKee was killed in the action. During the afternoon battle, about 100 men from the 7th Missouri Cavalry dismounted and supported Battery L, 1st Missouri Light Artillery. After the battle, members of the regiment buried their dead with the name, company, and regiment cut into head boards.

From 27 to 29 December 1862, the 7th Missouri Cavalry took part in the expedition to Van Buren. The soldiers marched 24 mi (39 km) into the Boston Mountains on the first day. One officer from the regiment wrote, "the night was very cold and the boys doubled up to keep warm". When the Federals quit Van Buren on the evening of 29 December, they took 50 captured wagons with supplies. They also burned five steamboats and destroyed tons of material badly needed by the Confederacy.

=== Little Rock expedition ===
The 7th Missouri Cavalry marched to Flat Creek in February 1863. From there they moved to Rolla, Missouri. The unit took part in operations against Marmaduke's raid to Cape Girardeau from 17 April to 2 May. The regiment was stationed at Pilot Knob until July. The unit was assigned to the 1st Brigade, 1st Cavalry Division, District of Southeast Missouri, Department of Missouri in July–August and was at Brownsville, Arkansas on 25 July. The regiment was assigned to the 1st Brigade, 1st Cavalry Division, Arkansas Expedition, from September 1863 to January 1864. During Frederick Steele's expedition to Little Rock, Arkansas, the 7th Missouri Cavalry was part of Lewis Merrill's 1st Brigade in John Wynn Davidson's 1st Cavalry Division. The other units in the brigade were the 2nd Missouri and 8th Missouri Cavalry Regiments. There were clashes at Grand Prairie on 17 August, Brownsville on 25 August, and Ashley's Mills on 7 September. The climax of the expedition was the Battle of Bayou Fourche on 10 September 1863 when Steele moved his infantry along the north bank of the Arkansas River while Davidson's 6,000 cavalry crossed to the south bank. With John Montgomery Glover's brigade on the right and Merrill's brigade on the left, Davidson's horsemen drove back Marmaduke's cavalry and compelled Sterling Price's Confederates to evacuate Little Rock.

On 11–14 September 1863, the Union cavalry pursued Price's forces. On 10–18 November, the 7th Missouri Cavalry participated in an expedition from Benton to Mount Ida, Arkansas. On 5–13 December, the regiment engaged in a reconnaissance from Little Rock, including an 8 December skirmish at Princeton. In January–May 1864, 7th Missouri Cavalry was assigned to the 1st Brigade, 1st Cavalry Division, VII Corps, Department of Arkansas. At midnight on 18 January 1864, Powell Clayton led the 7th Missouri Cavalry, 5th Kansas Cavalry, and 1st Indiana Cavalry Regiments, and four artillery pieces from Pine Bluff. After a brief halt for breakfast on 19 January, Clayton's force skirmished with Confederate cavalry about 8 mi (13 km) south of Bayou Bartholomew. After their opponents withdrew, the Union cavalry pursued 7 mi (11 km) to Branchville where they occupied a Confederate camp. Soon after, Clayton's column withdrew to Pine Bluff. Captain Humphrey reported one man killed and one wounded in this action.

=== Camden expedition ===
On 18 March 1864, the 7th Missouri Cavalry was in action at Monticello. The regiment participated in Steele's Camden Expedition from 23 March to 3 May. The unit took part in an operation from Pine Bluff to Mount Elba and Longview on 27–31 March, including the Battle of Mount Elba on 30 March. A detachment fought at the Battle of Marks' Mills on 25 April. Steele at Camden sent Francis M. Drake with 1,200 Federal infantry, 240 wagons, and some cavalry and artillery to Pine Bluff on 23 April in order to get more supplies. On 25 April, the Union force was joined by 150 cavalry from Pine Bluff. That day, Drake's column was ambushed at Marks' Mills by Confederate cavalry under James F. Fagan, Joseph O. Shelby, and William Lewis Cabell and compelled to surrender after a five-hour fight.

From May–September 1864, the 7th Missouri Cavalry was assigned to Clayton's Independent Cavalry Brigade, VII Corps. In September, a detachment from 7th Missouri Cavalry was part of an expedition from Pine Bluff. There were clashes at Monticello on 10 September and at Brewer's Lane the following day. The unit was reassigned to the 2nd Brigade, Cavalry Division, VII Corps, from September 1864 to February 1865. The 7th Missouri Cavalry took part in a reconnaissance from Little Rock toward Mount Elba and Monticello on 4–11 October. The regiment skirmished near Pine Bluff on 9 January 1865. In this action, Captain John W. Toppass reported that one man was seriously wounded while fighting bushwhackers. The remaining soldiers were consolidated with the 1st Missouri Cavalry on 22 February 1865 and the 7th Missouri Cavalry ceased to exist.

== Casualties ==
During its service, the 7th Missouri Cavalry sustained losses of four Officers and 55 Enlisted men killed and mortally wounded, and four Officers and 228 Enlisted men dead by disease. Total fatalities were 291.

Union Army: 7th Missouri Volunteer Cavalry Casualties
Action	Officers Killed	Enlisted Killed	Officers Wounded	Enlisted Wounded	Officers Missing	Enlisted Missing
Spring Hill	0	0	0	5	0	0
Pink Hill	0	0	0	0	0	0
Raytown	0	1	1	0	0	0
Pleasant Hill	0	1	0	0	0	0
Columbus	0	0	0	2	0	0
Independence	0	4	1	3	1	54
Lone Jack	1	19	3	62	0	11
Prairie Grove	2	4	0	6	1	105
Van Buren	0	0	0	0	0	0
White River	0	0	0	0	0	4
Brownsville	0	0	0	0	0	0
Little Rock	0	0	0	0	0	0
Princeton	0	0	0	0	0	0
Branchville	0	0	0	0	0	0
Monticello	0	0	0	0	0	2
Mount Elba	0	0	0	0	0	0
Moro Bottom (Note: Moro Creek (Moro Bottom) is west of Marks' Mills State Park. See Google maps reference.)	0	0	0	4	1	74

== See also ==
- List of Missouri Union Civil War units

== Notes ==
Footnotes

Citations
