= 16th Missouri Infantry Regiment =

Infantry regiment of the Confederate States Army

16th Missouri Infantry Regiment Jackman's Missouri Regiment Caldwell's Missouri Regiment 7th Missouri Infantry Regiment (Lewis')
- Active: August 31, 1862 to June 8, 1865
- Country: Confederate States of America
- Branch: Confederate States Army
- Type: Infantry
- Size: 325 (July 6, 1863)
- Engagements: American Civil War: Battle of Prairie Grove; Battle of Helena; Battle of Pleasant Hill; Battle of Jenkins' Ferry

The 16th Missouri Infantry Regiment (also known as Jackman's Missouri Regiment, Caldwell's Missouri Regiment, and the 7th Missouri Infantry Regiment (Lewis')) was an infantry regiment that served in the Confederate States Army during the American Civil War. The regiment was formed from men recruited by Jeremiah V. Cockrell and Sidney D. Jackman during an expedition into Missouri in August 1862. Although the recruits fought at the Battle of Lone Jack on August 16, they were not officially mustered into Confederate service until August 31. The regiment fought at the Battle of Prairie Grove on December 7. In May 1863, the regiment was designated the 7th Missouri Infantry Regiment, although this designation was changed to the 16th Missouri Infantry Regiment in December. On July 4, the regiment fought at the Battle of Helena, suffering heavy casualties. The unit then spent time building fortifications at Little Rock, Arkansas, before leaving the town in September. The 16th Missouri then fought at the Battle of Pleasant Hill on April 9, 1864, and at the Battle of Jenkins' Ferry on April 30. On June 8, 1865, the men of the regiment were paroled and sent back to Missouri via steamboat. More men died while serving in the 16th Missouri Infantry Regiment than died in any other Missouri unit serving in the Confederate States Army.

== Organization ==
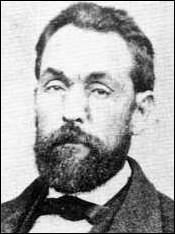
Sidney D. Jackman

During the middle of 1862, Jeremiah V. Cockrell and Sidney D. Jackman attempted to recruit men for a cavalry regiment in northwestern Arkansas. Because Cockrell and Jackman were unable to recruit enough men to form a regiment in Arkansas, the two men, accompanied by other recruiters, entered Missouri on August 1. After recruiting a number of men, Cockrell and Jackman established a camp near Lone Jack, Missouri on August 15. On August 16, Cockrell's force engaged a Union column commanded by Major Emory S. Foster as part of the Battle of Lone Jack. After a five-hour battle, the Union forces were defeated and forced to withdraw. Foster was severely wounded and captured. Jackman and Cockrell's recruits suffered at least 46 casualties at Lone Jack. More Union troops came to the area, and the Confederates withdrew back into Arkansas.

On August 31, the unit of recruits officially mustered into the Confederate States Army, while in the vicinity of Fayetteville, Arkansas as infantry. Cockrell returned to Missouri to continue recruiting cavalrymen, and Jackman became the first colonel of the regiment, which bore his name. Levin Major Lewis was the regiment's first lieutenant colonel, and Pleasant W. H. Cumming was the first major. As of the date of muster, the regiment's company organization was:

- Company A: Clay County, Jackson County, Johnson County, and Monroe County.
- Company B: Benton County and St. Clair County.
- Company C: Bates County, Boone County, Callaway County, and Johnson County.
- Company D: Johnson County.
- Company E: Newton County.
- Company F: Henry County and Johnson County.
- Company G: Dade County.
- Company H: McDonald County.
- Company I: Bates County and Henry County.
- Company K: Henry County.

== Service history ==
=== 1862 ===
Jackman resigned on September 25 to return to Missouri to continue recruiting; Jackman was replaced as commander of the regiment by Josiah H. Caldwell. On December 7, the regiment fought in the Battle of Prairie Grove as part of Brigadier General Mosby M. Parsons' brigade. Early in the fighting at Prairie Grove, Parsons' Brigade was aligned to support the Confederate left flank; the regiment (now known as Caldwell's Missouri Regiment) was on the left flank of Parsons' line. Later in the battle, Parsons' Brigade attacked a portion of Major General James G. Blunt's division. Parsons outflanked Blunt, and the Union troops were forced back. However, when a further attack was pressed against the Union line, Caldwell's Regiment was squeezed out by Parsons' advancing regiments and could not participate in the second charge. The regiment suffered 48 casualties at Prairie Grove. The Confederate army then fell back from Prairie Grove, and encamped at Van Buren, Arkansas.

=== 1863 ===
In January 1863, the regiment transferred from Van Buren to Little Rock, Arkansas. The next several months saw an outbreak of disease in the regiment, which took the lives of over 100 men. Colonel Caldwell resigned on March 23 and was replaced by Lewis. On May 3, the regiment was officially designated the 7th Missouri Infantry Regiment by special order of Major General Sterling Price. In late June, the regiment began moving towards Helena, Arkansas, although high water slowed the movement. During the Battle of Helena on July 4, the regiment, along with the rest of Parsons' Brigade, assaulted the Union defenses at Helena at a point known as Graveyard Hill. Parsons' charge was successful, but the rest of the Confederate assaults were repulsed, allowing Union troops to focus on Parsons' Brigade. After five hours of fighting, Parsons' Brigade was driven back with heavy losses, including many prisoners taken. At Helena, the 7th Missouri suffered 194 casualties; only 325 men remained in the regiment on July 6. Colonel Lewis was wounded and captured at Helena; Cumming replaced him as commander of the regiment.

After the debacle at Helena, the regiment returned to Little Rock, where it built defensive positions north of the city. Major General Frederick Steele's Union force advanced against Little Rock, but avoided the fortifications by attacking from the southeast. Parsons' Brigade left Little Rock on September 10 and transferred to the vicinity of Arkadelphia, Arkansas. On December 15, the regiment was renamed the 16th Missouri Infantry Regiment by order of Price's headquarters.

=== 1864–1865 ===
The 16th Missouri spent late 1864 in southern Arkansas. In March, Parsons was elevated to division command. His division contained the brigades of Colonels Simon P. Burns and John Bullock Clark Jr.; the 16th Missouri was in Burns' Brigade. Parsons' Division was sent to the aid of Major General Richard Taylor, who was threatened by a Union advance up the Red River; the troops reach Taylor on April 9. Later that day, the regiment participated in the Battle of Pleasant Hill. Parsons' Division, which was on the right flank of the Confederate line, attacked the Union line. The attack was initially successful, driving in part of the Union line, but a Union counterattack defeated the Confederates, who retreated in some disarray. The 16th Missouri lost 25 men at Pleasant Hill.

Parsons' Division then moved north to Camden, Arkansas, where a Union force commanded by Steele was positioned. Steele retreated in the face of the Confederate advance, but was caught by the Confederates at the crossing of the Saline River at Jenkins' Ferry. At the Battle of Jenkins' Ferry on April 30, the 16th Missouri was still part of Burns' Brigade, along with the 10th Missouri Infantry Regiment, 11th Missouri Infantry Regiment, 12th Missouri Infantry Regiment, Pindall's Missouri Sharpshooter Battalion, and Lesueur's Missouri Battery. At Jenkins' Ferry, Parsons arranged his division in a line with Burns' Brigade on the left and Clark's on the right. When Burns' Brigade advanced, it hit the 33rd Iowa Infantry Regiment and the 12th Kansas Regiment. After about half an hour of fighting, Burns' Brigade was able to work around the flank of the two Union regiments, driving them back. However, despite Burns' initial success, Union reinforcements arrived, driving the brigade back to where it had begun its attack. The 16th Missouri lost 30 men at Jenkins' Ferry, and Steele's force was able to escape across the Saline.

After Jenkins' Ferry, the regiment was stationed at various points in Arkansas and at Shreveport, Louisiana. Lewis returned to the regiment in early 1865, and was appointed to serve as a brigadier general by General Edmund Kirby Smith on May 16. (Note: Lewis' appointment as brigadier general was not officially confirmed.) Cumming was then officially promoted from lieutenant colonel to colonel. On June 8, the men of the regiment were paroled; they would return to Missouri via steamboat. The 16th Missouri Infantry had more men die while serving in the regiment than any other Missouri unit fighting for the Confederacy: 83 men killed in action, 253 died of various diseases, two were executed for deserting, and three were executed by Union forces.

== See also ==
- List of Missouri Confederate Civil War units

== General sources ==
- Forsyth, Michael J. (2003). The Camden Expedition of 1864. Jefferson, North Carolina: McFarland & Company, Inc. ISBN 0-7864-1554-1.
- Gerteis, Louis S. (2012). The Civil War in Missouri. Columbia, Missouri: University of Missouri Press. ISBN 978-0-8262-1972-5.
- Johnson, Ludwell H. (1993). Red River Campaign: Politics and Cotton in the Civil War. Kent, Ohio: Kent State University Press. ISBN 0-87338-486-5.
- McGhee, James E. (2008). Guide to Missouri Confederate Regiments, 1861–1865. Fayetteville, Arkansas: University of Arkansas Press. ISBN 978-1-55728-870-7.
- Shea, William L. (2009). Fields of Blood: The Prairie Grove Campaign. Chapel Hill: University of North Carolina Press. ISBN 978-0-8078-3315-5.
- Warner, Ezra J. (1987) [1959]. Generals in Gray (Louisiana Paperback ed.). Baton Rouge, Louisiana: Louisiana State University Press. ISBN 0-8071-3150-4.
