= Nichols's Missouri Cavalry Regiment =

Cavalry Regiment of the Confederate States Army

Nichols's Missouri Cavalry Regiment Jackman's Missouri Cavalry Regiment
- Active: June 22, 1864 to early June 1865
- Allegiance: Confederate States of America
- Branch: Confederate States Army
- Type: Cavalry
- Engagements: American Civil War: Price's Raid

Nichols's Missouri Cavalry Regiment served in the Confederate States Army during the late stages of the American Civil War. The cavalry regiment began recruiting in early 1864 under Colonel Sidney D. Jackman, who had previously raised a unit that later became the 16th Missouri Infantry Regiment. The regiment officially formed on June 22 and operated against the Memphis and Little Rock Railroad through August. After joining Major General Sterling Price's command, the unit participated in Price's Raid, an attempt to create a popular uprising against Union control of Missouri and draw Union troops away from more important theaters of the war. During the raid, while under the command of Lieutenant Colonel Charles H. Nichols, the regiment was part of an unsuccessful pursuit of Union troops who were retreating after the Battle of Fort Davidson in late September.

At the Battle of Little Blue River on October 21, Nichols's regiment attacked the Union flank, drawing artillery from the Union center to counter the regiment's attack. This allowed other Confederate units to successfully attack the now-weakened Union center. The next day, the regiment was part of a force that defeated the 2nd Kansas Militia Infantry Regiment during the Battle of Byram's Ford. On October 23, Nichols's regiment was engaged in the Confederate defeat at the Battle of Westport. After the defeat at Westport, the Confederates began retreating through Kansas. After a disastrous defeat at the Battle of Mine Creek on October 25, Nichols's regiment was part of the Confederate rear guard. The unit supported an artillery battery during the Second Battle of Newtonia on October 28, but did not see close combat. The men of Nichols's regiment were furloughed on October 30, with orders to return to the army in December. Before the war ended in 1865, the unit disbanded, probably while stationed in Texas; some of the men reported to Shreveport, Louisiana, in June to receive their paroles. The regiment had a strength of about 300 men in August 1864 and the number of casualties suffered by the regiment over the course of its existence cannot be accurately determined.

== Background and organization ==
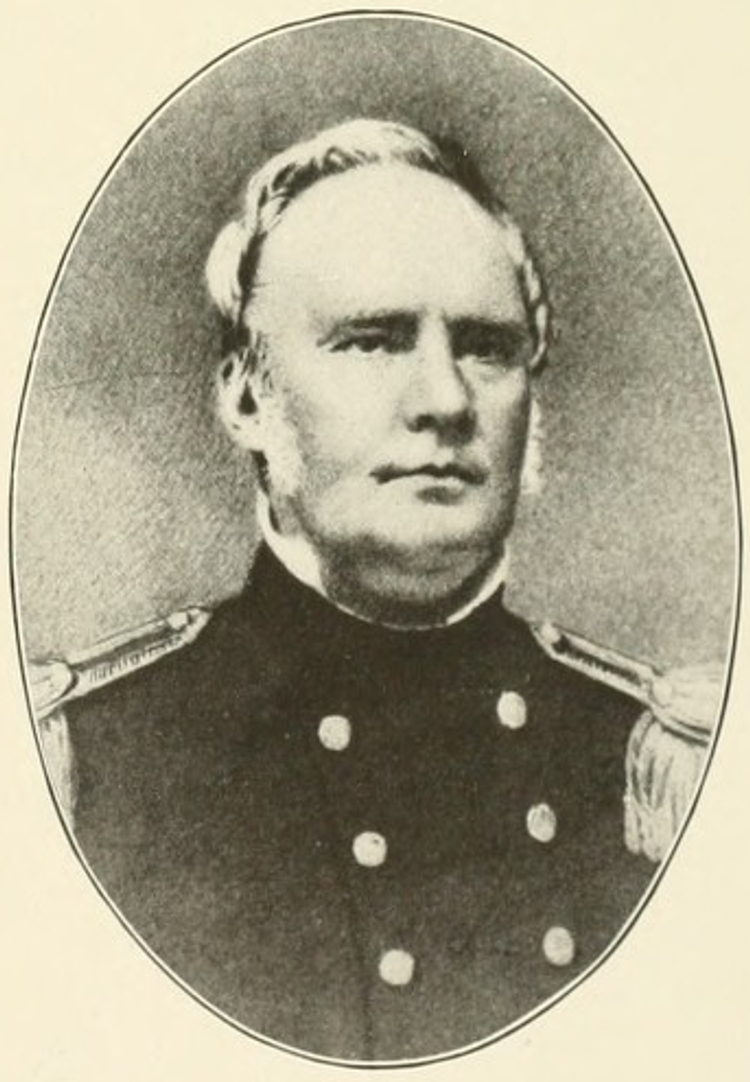
Sterling Price

At the outset of the American Civil War in April 1861, Missouri was a slave state. Governor Claiborne Fox Jackson supported secession from the United States, and formed a secessionist militia unit known as the Missouri State Guard. In July, anti-secession state legislators voted to remain in the Union, while Jackson and the pro-secession legislators voted to secede in November. Jackson and his supporters formed the Confederate government of Missouri and joined the Confederate States of America, functioning as a government-in-exile. As a result, Missouri had two opposing governments. Militarily, the pro-secession forces won some early victories, but the Union gained control of Missouri after the Battle of Pea Ridge in March 1862.

Colonel Sidney D. Jackman had led a newly recruited unit of Missouri Confederates in 1862, but resigned his commission when the unit was classified as infantry, as he preferred to lead cavalry. Jackman's former unit eventually became the 16th Missouri Infantry Regiment. Under the authority of Major General Thomas C. Hindman, Jackman returned to Missouri to continue recruiting cavalry. He led his recruits into Arkansas in October 1863 to join Major General Sterling Price's army. In early 1864, Jackman individually traveled to northeastern Arkansas to join the forces of Brigadier General Joseph O. Shelby, who authorized Jackman to begin recruiting again. Jackman's orders were to rejoin Shelby on June 16, at Jacksonport, Arkansas; Jackman and his recruits did not join the Confederates until June 22. About two-thirds of the new unit lacked weapons. Jackman was the regiment's colonel, while Charles H. Nichols was lieutenant colonel and George W. Newton was major. Ten companies of the regiment are known to have existed, but the only confirmed designations are G and H companies.

== Service history ==
=== Operations in Arkansas ===
The regiment spent July 1864 operating in the vicinity of the Memphis and Little Rock Railroad. That month, it took part in a fight that resulted in the unit inflicting 33 Union casualties and damaging about 1 mile (1.6 km) of the railroad. In August, Jackman was elevated to brigade command and Nichols took over leadership of the regiment. A squad of the unit moved on August 23, to join an attack on a station of the Memphis & Little Rock held by Union troops, but the fight had ended with a Union surrender before Nichols's men arrived. Later that same day, the men of the regiment were part of a Confederate column that attacked Jones's Hay Station, whose Union defenders quickly surrendered. The capture of the station netted 400 prisoners, as well as supplies, weapons, and a battle flag. Later, the unit skirmished for an hour with a Union column that had left DeVall's Bluff; the action ended when the Confederates disengaged. The regiment spent September 26 detached from the rest of Jackman's brigade as a rear guard unit. Nichols's regiment saw little further action until Price's Raid began in October. The regiment consisted of around 300 men during the month of August.

=== Price's Raid ===
==== Towards St. Louis ====
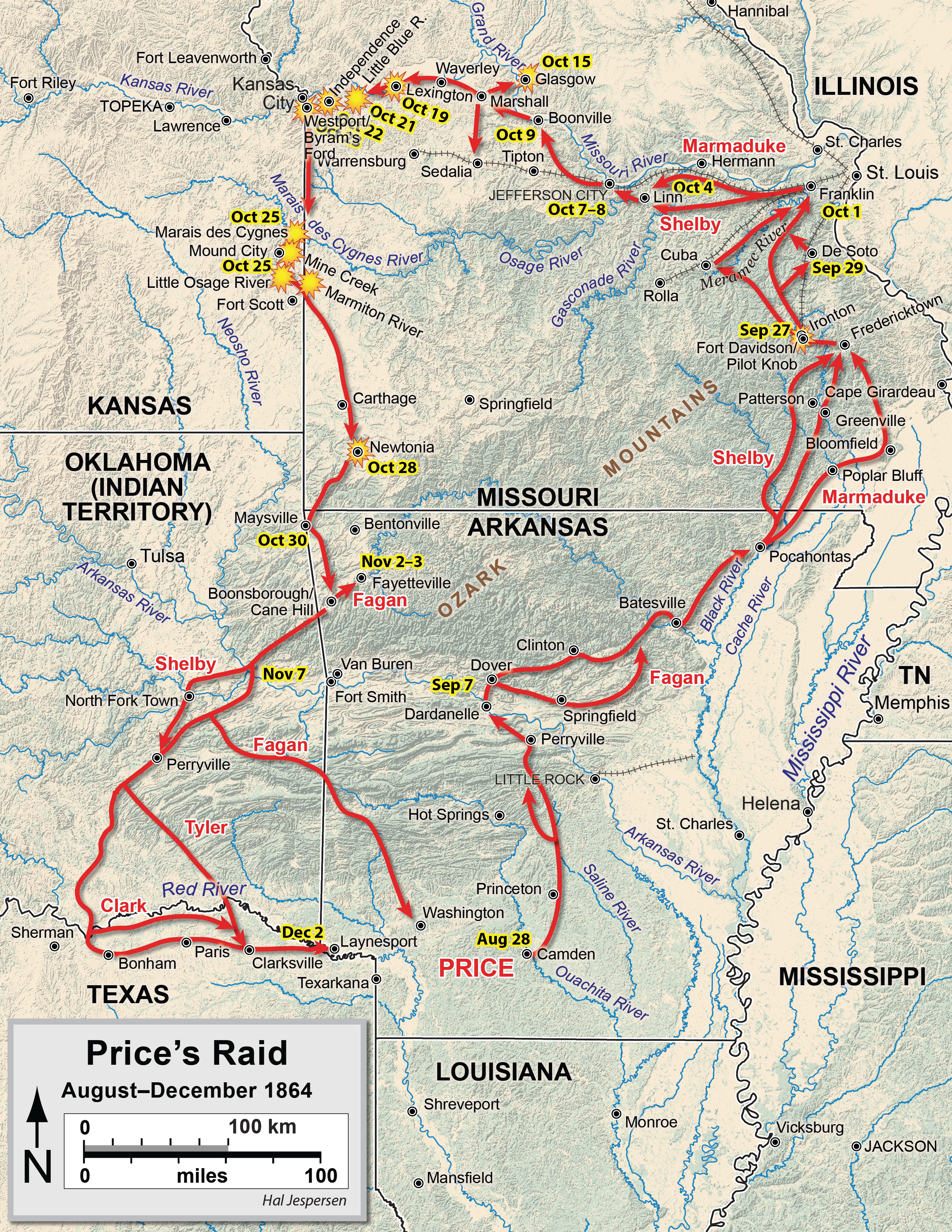
Map of Price's Raid

In the 1864 United States presidential election, incumbent president Abraham Lincoln supported continuing the war, while former Union general George B. McClellan promoted ending it. By the beginning of September 1864, military events in the eastern United States, especially the Confederate defeat in the Atlanta campaign, gave Lincoln an advantage in the election over McClellan. At this point, the Confederacy had very little chance of victory. As events east of the Mississippi River turned against the Confederacy, General Edmund Kirby Smith, commander of the Confederate Trans-Mississippi Department, was ordered to transfer the infantry under his command to the fighting in the Eastern and Western Theaters. This proved to be impossible, as the Union Navy controlled the Mississippi River, preventing a large-scale crossing.

Despite having limited resources for an offensive, Smith decided that an attack designed to divert Union troops from the principal theaters of combat would have the same effect as the proposed transfer of troops. Price and the new Confederate Governor of Missouri, Thomas Caute Reynolds, (Note: Jackson had died in early December 1862 of cancer; Reynolds replaced him in office on February 14, 1863.) suggested that an invasion of Missouri would be an effective operation; Smith approved the plan and appointed Price to command it. Price expected that the offensive would create a popular uprising against Union control of Missouri, divert Union troops away from the principal theaters of combat (many of the Union troops defending Missouri had been transferred out of the state, leaving the Missouri State Militia as the state's primary defensive force), and aid McClellan's chance of defeating Lincoln. On September 19, Price's column entered the state.

Nichols's regiment, as part of Jackman's brigade, traveled to Potosi. On September 24, Price learned that a Union force held the town of Pilot Knob. On September 26, Price moved to counter this force by sending Shelby's men to operate north of Pilot Knob, while moving the divisions of Brigadier General John S. Marmaduke and Major General James F. Fagan against the town. On September 27, Marmaduke's and Fagan's men attacked the Union soldiers, bringing on the Battle of Fort Davidson. The Confederate attackers suffered significant losses and were repulsed, although the Union troops abandoned the fort overnight. Price ordered Shelby's division, including Nichols's regiment, to pursue the Union soldiers, who managed to escape. On September 30, and October 1, the regiment operated against the Pacific Railroad, destroying parts of it. Jackman's brigade then headed to Jefferson City, and Nichols's regiment fought in several minor skirmishes on the way. On October 10, the unit arrived at Boonville, where it deployed south of the town to guard a road. Two days later, Union troops attacked the regiment's position. In this action, Nichols's unit, which was reportedly about 300-men strong, was initially driven back by the 5th Missouri State Militia Cavalry Regiment, but the Unionists retreated after engaging Hunter's Missouri Cavalry Regiment, Schnable's Missouri Cavalry Battalion, and Collins's Missouri Battery. The skirmish lasted about an hour.

==== To Kansas City ====
As the Confederate army passed through a pro-Confederate region around Boonville known as Little Dixie, many new recruits joined Price's force. Many of these men were unarmed, and Price needed weapons to issue to them. Price authorized a raid against Glasgow to capture supplies. This raiding force was under the command of Brigadier General John B. Clark Jr. Jackman selected elements of his brigade to serve with Clark on the left of the Confederate line. The attack against Glasgow was successful, with weapons, supplies, and prisoners being captured. The Confederate victors at Glasgow then rejoined Price's main army, which was moving towards Kansas City. The Confederate army encountered a Union force holding the town of Lexington on October 19, starting the Second Battle of Lexington. Jackman's brigade was sent around the Confederate left flank to cut off the Union path of retreat, but the brigade failed to get into an appropriate position to block the Union retreat, allowing the town's defenders to escape.

The Union soldiers engaged at Lexington fell back to Independence, leaving a small force to hold the crossing of the Little Blue River. Elements of Marmaduke's division attacked this holding force on October 21, bringing on the Battle of Little Blue River. Marmaduke's men drove the Union defenders back across the creek, but reinforcements for both sides arrived: those for the Union under Major General James G. Blunt, and the Confederates under Shelby's command. Nichols's regiment was deployed on the extreme Confederate right, from which it applied pressure on the Union flank. The regiment was the only one of Shelby's units to remain mounted. Union artillery was moved from other parts of the line to counter Nichols's attack, which in turn weakened the Union center, allowing Brigadier General M. Jeff Thompson's brigade to successfully attack it. Union troops counterattacked to rescue the threatened artillery and then fell back to Independence.

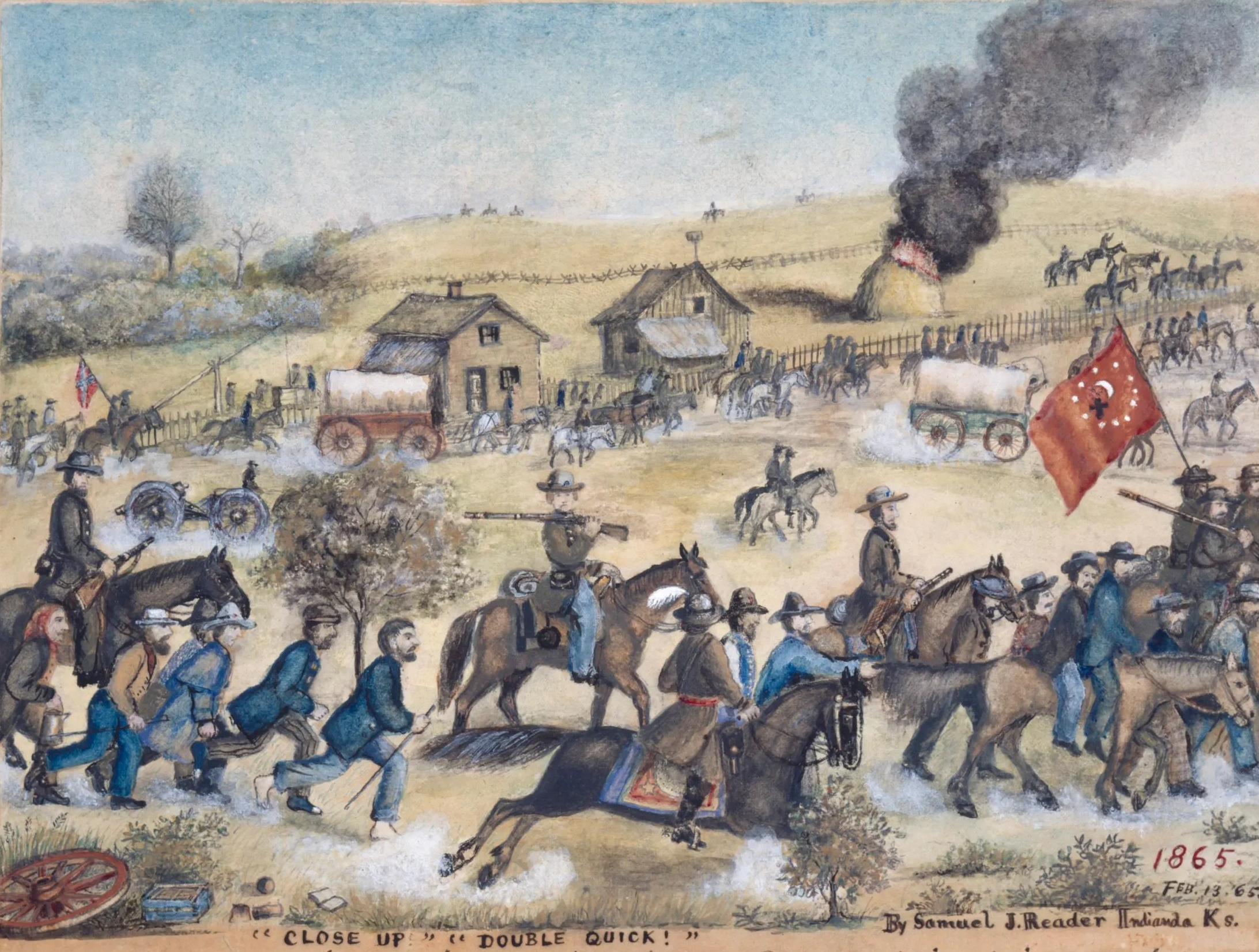
Confederate cavalry during Price's Raid drawn by Samuel J. Reader in 1865

The next day, some of Shelby's men broke through a Union line defending the Big Blue River in the opening stages of the Battle of Byram's Ford. Jackman's brigade and the 5th Missouri Cavalry Regiment then encountered a Union unit, the 2nd Kansas Militia Infantry Regiment, near the Mockbee Farm. Initially, the Kansans held their ground, fighting off two attacks, but a third attack shattered the Union line. Initially used to guard the Confederate flank, Nichols's regiment was involved in this affair, which resulted in the capture of a 24-pounder howitzer. While Jackman reported his losses as slight, Nichols's horse was killed during the fighting. That evening, Union cavalry commanded by Major General Alfred Pleasonton who had been following Price from the east, attacked and defeated his rear guard in the Second Battle of Independence.

By the morning of October 23, Price's army was caught between Pleasonton's troopers, who had advanced to between Independence and the Big Blue River, and Blunt's men. Major General Samuel R. Curtis's Union Army of the Border occupied Kansas City, adding to the encirclement. That day, Pleasonton's men continued the Battle of Byram's Ford, driving Marmaduke's division back from the Big Blue River. Meanwhile, Shelby's and Fagan's divisions fought against Blunt's men and elements of the Kansas State Militia in the Battle of Westport, the result being a Confederate defeat. Nichols's regiment took part in the Westport fighting in the vicinity of Brush Creek. Later in the fighting, Union troops coming from the east put pressure on Fagan's line, and Nichols's regiment was part of a force sent to Fagan's aid. The regiment, as well as the rest of Jackman's brigade, conducted a rear-guard action while dismounted before retreating.

==== Retreat and war's end ====
The Confederates retreated south into Kansas. On October 25, Union troops caught up with Price's column, and soundly defeated it at the Battle of Mine Creek. During the battle, hundreds of Confederate soldiers were captured including Marmaduke, as well as cannons and supplies. Shelby led a rear-guard action, which included Nichols's regiment. The Confederate troops conducted a drawn-out running fight until the Union pursuers broke contact later that day. After Mine Creek, the Confederates re-entered Missouri, where they stopped near the town of Newtonia on October 28, only for Blunt's troops to reestablish contact. During the Second Battle of Newtonia, Nichols's regiment was held to the rear of the right side of the Confederate line, supporting Collins's battery, and did not see close combat.

Price's army continued its retreat into Arkansas, where Nichols's regiment was furloughed on October 30, along with much of the rest of Jackman's brigade. The furloughs were ostensibly for the men to perform recruiting activities and catch deserters, but were mostly due to a lack of food and the continuing disintegration of the structure and morale of Price's army. The furlough terms set a date of mid-December for the men to return to the army. While direct evidence for the men's return from furlough is lacking, historian James McGhee believes that they did eventually return to Price's army. A Union cavalry officer reported clashing with Nichols's regiment near Crooked Creek in northern Arkansas on November 15, and stated that there were about 600 men with the unit. The unit disbanded in 1865 before the war ended, probably while stationed in Texas, and few of the men from Nichols's regiment reported to Shreveport, Louisiana, in June to receive their combat-ending paroles. No complete muster records for Nichols's regiment exist, and casualty figures for the unit cannot be accurately discerned.

== Sources ==
- Ainsworth, Fred C.; Kirkley, Joseph W., eds. (1902) [1893]. The War of the Rebellion: A Compilation of the Official Records of the Union and Confederate Armies. Vol. 41. Washington, D.C.: United States Government Printing Office. OCLC 262466842.
- Collins, Charles D. Jr. (2016). Battlefield Atlas of Price's Missouri Expedition of 1864 (PDF). Fort Leavenworth, Kansas: Combat Studies Institute Press. ISBN 978-1-940804-27-9.
- Kennedy, Frances H., ed. (1998). The Civil War Battlefield Guide (2nd ed.). Boston/New York: Houghton Mifflin. ISBN 978-0-395-74012-5.
- Lause, Mark A. (2016). The Collapse of Price's Raid: The Beginning of the End in Civil War Missouri. Columbia, Missouri: University of Missouri Press. ISBN 978-0-826-22025-7.
- McGhee, James E. (2008). Guide to Missouri Confederate Regiments, 1861–1865. Fayetteville, Arkansas: University of Arkansas Press. ISBN 978-1-55728-870-7.
- Parrish, William Earl (2001) [1973]. A History of Missouri: 1860–1875. Columbia, Missouri: University of Missouri Press. ISBN 978-0-8262-1376-1.
- Sinisi, Kyle S. (2020) [2015]. The Last Hurrah: Sterling Price's Missouri Expedition of 1864 (paperback ed.). Lanham, Maryland: Rowman & Littlefield. ISBN 978-1-5381-4151-9.
