= Gideon W. Thompson =

Confederate Army officer

- Born: February 18, 1823; Todd County, Kentucky, U.S.
- Died: January 8, 1902 (aged 78); Platte County, Missouri, U.S.
- Burial place: Barry Cemetery, Platte Co., MO
- Military career
- Allegiance: Missouri; Confederate States of America
- Branch: Missouri State Guard; Confederate States Army
- Service years: 1861–1865
- Rank: Colonel
- Conflicts: American Civil War; *Siege of Lexington; *Battle of Pea Ridge; *First Battle of Independence; *Second Battle of Springfield; *Battle of Hartville; *Battle of Helena

Gideon W. Thompson (February 28, 1823 – January 8, 1902) was a colonel in the Missouri State Guard and the Confederate Army during the American Civil War. He assumed command on the field after the fall of Brigadier General John T. Hughes at the First Battle of Independence.

== Early life ==
Gideon W. Thompson was born in Todd County, Kentucky, to Robert C. Thompson and Eveline (Roberts). They relocated to Howard County, Missouri, while Gideon was a toddler. Gideon became a farmer and livestock trader in Platte County, Missouri.

== Civil War ==
At the outbreak of the Civil War, Thompson was elected captain of a company in the 5th Division of the Missouri State Guard. Serving in the major battles of Price's 1861 Missouri campaign he was elected major then colonel in November 1861. In August 1862 he was recruiting a new regiment in Missouri and suffered a wound to the foot or leg at the First Battle of Independence.

Thompson was appointed Colonel of the 6th Missouri Cavalry (Confederate) November 9, 1862, as a result of John T. Coffee's removal from command on charges of drunkenness. The regiment participated in three large Missouri raids in 1863, including the Battle of Hartville and the defense of Little Rock, Arkansas. At the Battle of Hartville, he was reported as doing his duty "well and nobly" while commanding his regiment. After the Battle of Hartville, he was mistakenly reported dead in enemy communications by Union Brigadier General Fitz Henry Warren. After his many exploits during these campaigns, a command reorganization in December 1863 resulted in his replacement by another commander.

== Post-war ==
At the close of hostilities, Thompson returned to his farm in Platte County, Missouri. He died January 8, 1902, and is buried in the Barry Cemetery in Clay County, Missouri.

== See also ==
- Allardice, Bruce S., Confederate Colonels: a Biographical Register Columbia, MO: University of Missouri Press, 2008.
- Eakin, Joanne Chiles, Battle of Independence, August 11, 1862, Independence, MO: Two Trails Publishing, 2000
- Eakin, Joanne Chiles, Battle of Lone Jack, August 16, 1862, Independence, MO: Two Trails Publishing, 2001
- Peterson, Richard C.; McGhee, James C.; Lindberg, Kip A.; & Daleen, Keith I., Sterling Price's Lieutenants, Rev. Ed., Independence, MO: Two Trails Publishing, 2007
- McGhee, James E., Guide to Missouri Confederate Units, 1861-1865, University of Arkansas, 2010
- Paxton, William M., Annals of Platte County, Missouri: From its Exploration Down to June 1, 1897, Platte County, MO: Hudson-Kimberly Publishing Co., 1897
