= Battle of Independence =

Battle of Independence may refer to:

- First Battle of Independence, a battle of the American Civil War fought in on 11 August 1862
- Second Battle of Independence, a battle of the American Civil War fought on 22 October 1864

== See also ==
- War of independence
