= First Battle of Independence =

Battle of the American Civil War

Coordinates: 39.0938°N 94.4168°W

- Part of the Trans-Mississippi Theater of the American Civil War
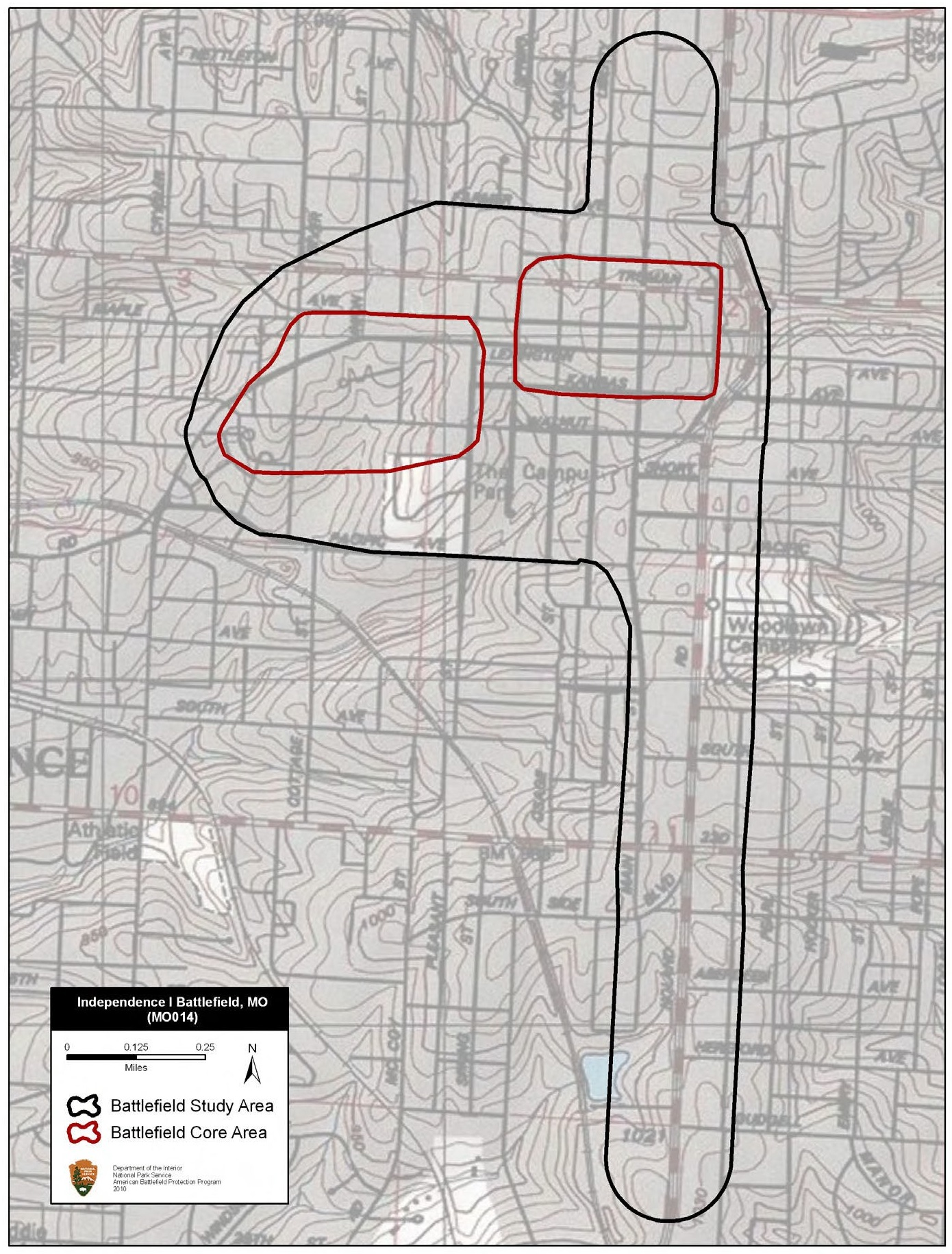
- Independence Battlefield
Date	August 11, 1862
Location	Independence, Missouri
Result	Confederate victory

Belligerents
United States (Union)	(Confederate States of America) CSA (Confederacy)

Commanders and leaders
James T. Buel	John T. Hughes; Gideon W. Thompson

Strength
344	700–800

Casualties and losses
~344	Unknown

The First Battle of Independence was a minor engagement of the American Civil War, occurring on August 11, 1862, in the city of Independence, located in Jackson County, Missouri. Its result was a Confederate victory, continuing the Southern domination of the Jackson County area for a few days while the recruiters completed their work.

This battle should not be confused with the Second Battle of Independence, which was fought in 1864. That battle resulted in a Union victory.

== Background ==
During the summer of 1862, many Confederate and Missouri State Guard recruiters were dispatched northward from Arkansas into Missouri to replenish the depleted ranks of Trans-Mississippi forces. Among these were Captain Jo Shelby, Colonel Vard Cockrell, Colonel John T. Coffee, Upton Hays, John Charles Tracy, John T. Hughes, Gideon W. Thompson and DeWitt C. Hunter.

Various guerrillas and bushwhackers, most notably those under William Quantrill, had gathered in Missouri and assisted these recruiters as they worked in the region. For example, Upton Hays was aided by thirty men from Quantrill's command under the brutal George Todd. By August 1, Hays was camped near Lee's Summit with 150 men. Additional Confederates continued to infiltrate the area throughout the days that followed.

Union forces, meanwhile, were bivouacked in Independence, the county seat of Jackson County. These were led by Lt. Col. James T. Buel. Like many towns in that part of Missouri, Independence had a number of sympathizers from both sides residing in it.

Colonel Hughes intended to cross the Missouri River, to recruit around his hometown of Clinton County, Missouri. He and Gideon Thompson rode to Hays's camp with 75 men; 25 additional men with Quantrill soon arrived. The officers conferred. Desperate for ammunition, and needing a victory to stir their recruiting efforts, they determined to make a surprise attack against Buel before he could attack them. Cole Younger and another man conducted a successful reconnaissance of the town on the day prior to the Confederate attack.

Lt. Col. Buel for his part had sent one of his officers, a Captain Breckenridge, scouting for eleven days, but Breckenridge found nothing. Buel became aware of Hays's camp, however, and prepared to attack it. On the evening of August 10, several citizens warned Buel of an impending assault on the city; many Union residents had already fled. Buel ignored these warnings, but another of his officers, a Captain Rodewald, did not.

The Federals were positioned in three main concentrations: their camp near a rock wall, the bank serving as Buel's headquarters, and the county jail.

== Opposing forces ==
=== Union ===
Lt. Col. James T. Buel

- 7th Missouri Volunteer Cavalry (cos. B & D) - Capt. James Breckenridge, Lt. James M. Vance
- 2nd Battalion Missouri State Militia Cavalry (cos. B, D, & E) - Capt. Jacob Axline, Capt. Franklin Cochran, Capt. Aaron Thomas
- 6th Regiment Missouri Enrolled Militia (1 company) - W.H. Rodewald

=== Confederate ===
Col./Acting Brigadier John T. Hughes

- Hughes' Recruiters
- Hays' Regiment
- Quantrill's Guerrillas

== Battle ==
Col. John T. Hughes's Confederate force, including the partisan leader William Quantrill, attacked Independence before dawn, in two columns using different roads. They drove through the town to the Union Army camp, delivering a deadly volley to the sleeping men. Captain Breckenridge suggested surrender, but Captain Jacob Axline formed the Federal troops behind a rock wall and a nearby ditch while the Confederates rifled through their camp, looking for ammunition. The Rebels made several attacks against Axline's wall, but never succeeded in taking it. Here Colonel Hughes was killed, while Thompson and Hays were wounded.

Lt. Col. Buel attempted to hold out with part of his force in the bank building he used as his headquarters. He was forced to surrender after an adjacent building was set afire. Through a flag of truce, Buel arranged a meeting with the new Confederate commander, Col. Gideon W. Thompson, who had replaced Colonel Hughes, killed earlier. Buel surrendered, and about 150 of his men were paroled; the remainder had escaped, hidden, or been killed.

== Murders committed by George Todd ==
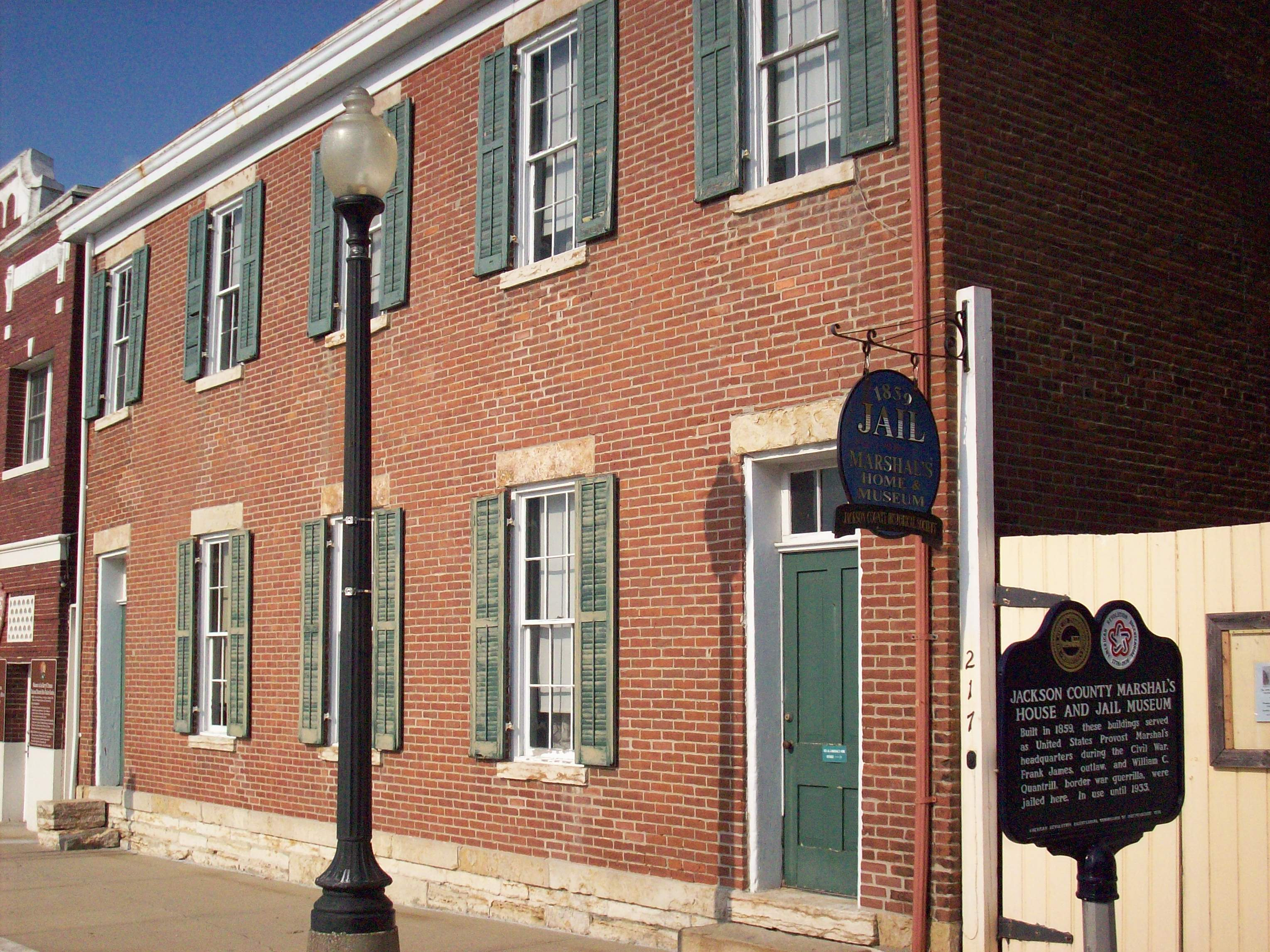
1859 Independence Jail. George Todd murdered one of the jail prisoners, together with a captured Federal officer, during the First Battle of Independence

Realizing that they would be quickly overwhelmed, the Federal troops defending the jail fired a volley and fled. Confederate guerilla leader George Todd freed the prisoners at the jail, among them City Marshal James Knowles, jailed for the killing of a rowdy citizen. Todd also captured Captain Aaron Thomas of the 2nd Battalion Missouri State Militia Cavalry. Knowles had guided Thomas' force in a successful ambush of Todd's command in an earlier engagement, killing several of them. Todd and his men summarily executed Knowles and Thomas. Ironically, George Todd was later killed at the Second Battle of Independence, in 1864.

== Casualties and aftermath ==
The First Battle of Independence resulted in approximately 344 known Union casualties; total losses for the Confederate side are unknown.

Most of the Union command in Independence was captured, with only a few groups of men making good their escape. The Confederate victory was costly, however, resulting in the death of ten experienced officers, among them Colonel John T. Hughes, and the wounding of Colonels Hays and Thompson. The victors left town late that afternoon, but remained in the area for several days. Hays led them in a cooperative attack with other Confederate commands against a Federal force arriving at Lone Jack.

Although the Southerners had won a victory at Independence, they were unable to follow it up in any significant fashion. Confederate dominance in the Jackson County area would continue—but not for long.

Lt. Col. Buel's performance and his failure to heed warnings of impending attack by prominent citizens were widely condemned. Captain Breckenridge's inability to find any guerrillas in the preceding eleven days, together with his eagerness to surrender, were also considered disgraceful. Both men were court-martialled and the soldiers who had been captured were mustered out of service. Since the two officers had been dismissed with their men, nothing ultimately came of the court martial proceedings.

On June 3, 1864, the former Capt. Axline was murdered by guerrillas (probably of George Todd's command) while on his way home to Hickman Mills.

Independence would later become the site of a second Civil War battle, in October 1864, as part of General Sterling Price's Missouri Campaign that culminated in his defeat at the Battle of Westport.
