= Levin Major Lewis =

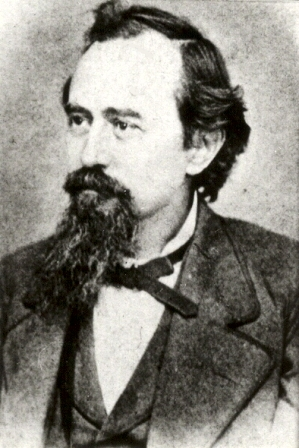
- Born: January 6, 1832; Baltimore, Maryland
- Died: May 28, 1886 (aged 54); Los Angeles, California
- Burial place: Greenwood Cemetery; Dallas, Texas
- Military career
- Allegiance: Confederate States of America
- Branch: Confederate States Army
- Service years: 1861–1865
- Rank: Colonel, CSA; Assigned to duty as: Brigadier General
- Commands: 16th Missouri Infantry Regiment
- Conflicts: American Civil War

Levin Major Lewis (January 6, 1832 – May 28, 1886) was a Confederate States Army colonel during the American Civil War. On May 16, 1865, he was assigned to duty as a brigadier general by General E. Kirby Smith when the war in the Trans-Mississippi Department was almost over, but he was not officially appointed by Confederate President Jefferson Davis and confirmed by the Confederate Senate to that grade.

At about age 22, Lewis moved to Missouri and briefly practiced law before becoming a Methodist minister. He was the principal of Plattsburg College from 1856 to 1859. At the outbreak of the Civil War, he organized a company of the pro-Confederate Missouri State Guard and was elected captain. In April 1861, he was elected colonel of the 3rd Cavalry Regiment of the 5th Division of the Missouri State Guard, a one-year regiment. After the end of the regiment's term, he was briefly an aide-de-camp for Major General Earl Van Dorn and then was elected a captain of the Confederate 7th Missouri Infantry. He was wounded four times at the Battle of Lone Jack, Missouri on August 16, 1862. The regiment soon broke up and Lewis became a major of another 7th Missouri Infantry, later designated the 16th Missouri Infantry. He became colonel of that regiment on March 24, 1863.

Lewis was wounded and captured in an attack on the Union force at Helena, Arkansas, on July 4, 1863. He was released from the prisoner of war camp at Johnson's Island, Ohio and exchanged in September 1864. Lewis declined an appointment from Confederate Missouri Governor Thomas Caute Reynolds to the Confederate Senate and returned to the army. Lewis was assigned to duty on May 16, 1865, by General E. Kirby Smith so that he could command an infantry brigade with the appropriate rank, although the war was effectively ended and the promotion could not be made through a legal appointment by Jefferson Davis or confirmation by the Confederate Senate.

After the war, Lewis returned to the ministry and at various times was president of Arcadia Female College, Arkansas Female College and Marvin College (Waxahachie, Texas). He also was a professor of English for a time at Texas A&M University. In 1884, he was appointed pastor of the First Methodist Church in Dallas, Texas.

== Early life ==
Levin Major Lewis was born in Baltimore, Maryland, on January 6, 1832. His parents were John Kendall and Mary (Jones) Lewis, a family of wealthy planters in Dorchester County, Maryland. Lewis's father died when he was young and he was raised by an uncle in Vienna in Dorchester County.

Lewis attended school in Washington, D.C., in 1843, and then at the Maryland Military Academy and at Wesleyan University in Middletown, Connecticut. A member of the class of 1852, Lewis left Wesleyan in his sophomore year to study law. In 1854 or 1855, he moved to Missouri and briefly practiced law before turning to the ministry. He became a Methodist minister in Liberty, Missouri, and Missouri City, Missouri. Lewis was principal of Plattsburg College in Plattsburg, Missouri, from 1856 to 1859.

Lewis's wife's maiden name was Margaret Barrow.

== American Civil War service ==
Levin Major Lewis was an early organizer and captain of a company in the pro-Confederate Missouri State Guard. In April 1861, Lewis was elected colonel of the 3rd Cavalry Regiment, 5th Division of the Missouri State Guard under Major General Sterling Price, a one-year regiment. In March 1862, he became a volunteer aide-de-camp for Major General Earl Van Dorn.

On June 18, 1862, Lewis was elected a captain of the Confederate 7th Missouri Infantry. He was wounded four times at the Battle of Lone Jack, Missouri on August 16, 1862. One of these wounds was from a spent musket ball which hit Lewis's forehead sufficiently hard to stick and which Lewis picked out and showed to his colonel.

After the Battle of Lone Jack, Lewis's regiment was broken up and Lewis became a major of another 7th Missouri Infantry, later designated the 16th Missouri Infantry Regiment. On December 4, 1862, Lewis was promoted to lieutenant colonel. On December 7, 1862, the regiment fought at the Battle of Prairie Grove. Lewis was promoted to colonel of the regiment on March 4, 1863, or March 24, 1863.

On July 4, 1863, Lewis led his regiment in the unsuccessful Confederate attack on the Union Army garrison at the Battle of Helena, Arkansas, where he was wounded and captured. He was released from the prisoner of war camp at Johnson's Island, Ohio and exchanged in September 1864. Lewis first went to the Confederate capital of Richmond, Virginia, where he declined an appointment to the Confederate Senate from Confederate Missouri Governor Thomas Caute Reynolds and then returned to his regiment.

Lewis was assigned to duty as a brigadier general on May 16, 1865, by General E. Kirby Smith so that he could command an infantry brigade with the appropriate rank, although the war was effectively ended by the surrender of the Army of Northern Virginia a month earlier and the capture of Jefferson Davis by Union troops in Georgia six days earlier. Smith also had no legal authority to promote officers to general officer rank. While Lewis vigorously opposed surrender of the Trans-Mississippi Department, by mid-May 1865 Smith realized the Confederacy was defeated, further fighting was senseless and he surrendered his forces and department on May 26, 1865.

== Aftermath ==
After the war, Lewis returned to the Methodist ministry. He served congregations in Shreveport, Louisiana, Galveston, Texas, and St. Louis, Missouri.

Lewis was president of Arcadia Female College in Missouri from 1870 through 1873, Arkansas Female College from 1874 to 1878 and Marvin College at Waxahachie, Texas in 1880. He was also a professor of English and was the first Head of the English Department at Texas A&M University in the year 1878–1879. In 1884, he left Waxahachie and was appointed pastor of the First Methodist Church in Dallas, Texas.

Levin Major Lewis died on May 28, 1886, in Los Angeles, California where he had gone for health reasons. He is buried in Greenwood Cemetery in Dallas, Texas.

== See also ==
- List of American Civil War generals (Acting Confederate)
