= John H. Stephens =

American politician (1847–1924)

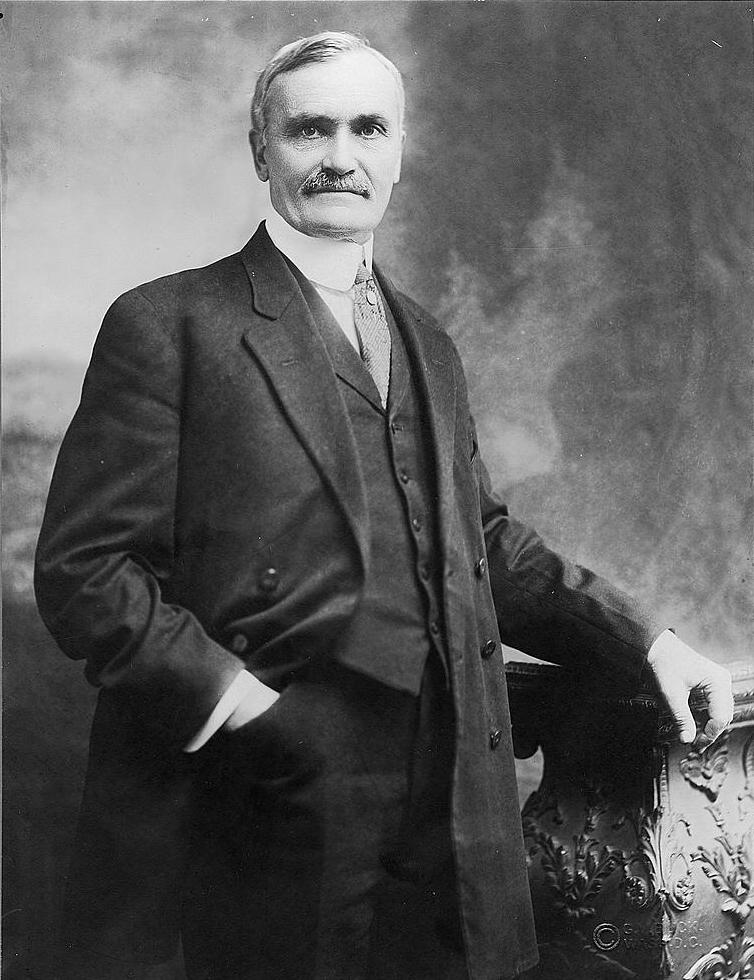

Member of the U.S. House of Representatives from Texas's 13th district
- In office March 4, 1897 – March 3, 1917
- Preceded by: Jeremiah V. Cockrell
- Succeeded by: John M. Jones

Personal details
- Born: John Hall Stephens; November 22, 1847 Shelby County, Texas, U.S.
- Died: November 18, 1924 (aged 76) Monrovia, California, U.S.
- Resting place: East View Cemetery; Vernon, Texas
- Party: Democratic

John Hall Stephens (November 22, 1847 – November 18, 1924) was an American lawyer and politician who served ten terms as a U.S. representative from Texas from 1897 to 1917.

== Early life and education ==
Born in Shelby County, Texas, Stephens attended the common schools in Mansfield, Texas. He graduated from Mansfield College, and from the law department of Cumberland University, Lebanon, Tennessee, in 1872.

== Career ==
After gaining admission to the bar in 1873, he practiced in Montague, Montague County, and Vernon, Wilbarger County, Texas.

He served as a member of the Texas State Senate from 1886 to 1888, and then resumed the practice of law in Vernon, Texas.

=== Congress ===
Stephens was elected as a Democrat to the Fifty-fifth and to the nine succeeding Congresses (March 4, 1897 – March 3, 1917). He served as chair of the Committee on Indian Affairs (Sixty-second through Sixty-fourth Congresses). He was an unsuccessful candidate for renomination in 1916.

== Retirement and death ==
He moved to Monrovia, California, in 1917, and died 4 days before his 77th birthday there November 18, 1924. He was interred in East View Cemetery, Vernon, Texas.

== Legacy ==
Stephens County, Oklahoma, was named for him.

== Sources ==
- United States Congress. "John H. Stephens (id: S000858)". Biographical Directory of the United States Congress.

U.S. House of Representatives
| Preceded by Jeremiah V. Cockrell | Member of the U.S. House of Representatives from Texas's 13th congressional district 1897–1917 | Succeeded by John M. Jones |
