= Mount Elba, Arkansas =

Unincorporated community in Arkansas, US

Coordinates: 33°51′03″N 92°09′31″W

Mount Elba is an unincorporated community in Cleveland County, Arkansas, United States. The land belonged to the Quapaw people, but it was opened to American settlement by a treaty in 1824. By the 1830s, a settlement was set up on the east bank of the Saline River on the road between Pine Bluff and Camden. Ferry service began in 1845 and a post office was opened in 1847. Mount Elba was a bustling community by the time of the American Civil War and a skirmish was fought there on March 30, 1864 as part of the Camden Expedition. The conflict badly damaged the town and the surrounding area. With the establishment of railroads, the importance of river traffic declined and the town's population dwindled. Only a few residences remain in the area.

== Geography ==
Mount Elba is located on County Road 122 a distance of 8.4 mi (13.5 km) south of Rison, or 10.3 mi (16.6 km) if taking Arkansas Highway 35 and County Road 114.
