= Battle of Lone Jack =

Battle of the American Civil War

Coordinates: 38°52′14″N 94°11′17″W

- Part of the Trans-Mississippi Theater of the American Civil War
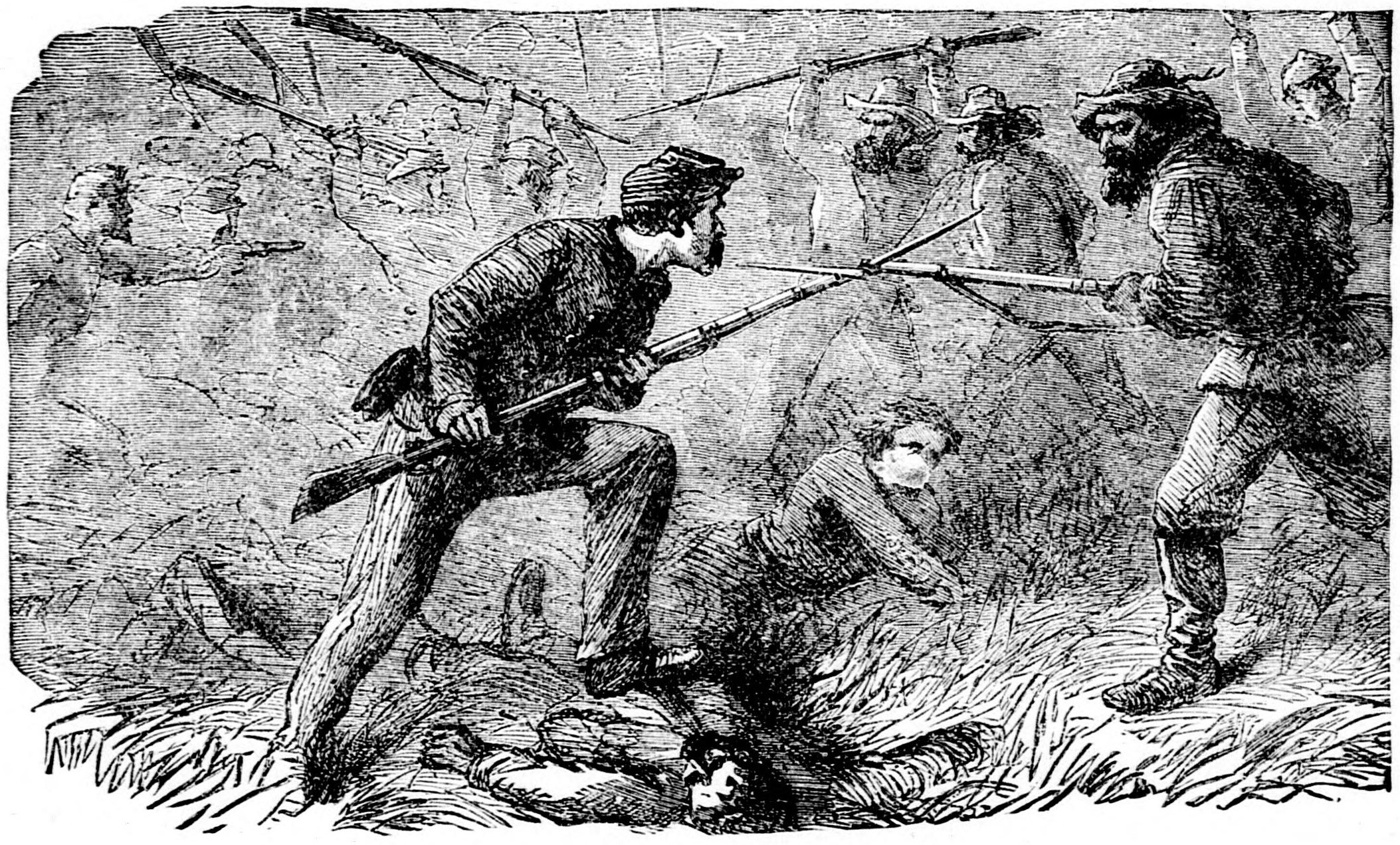
- Hand-to Hand fight at Lone Jack (19th-century illustration of Younger Brothers story)
Date	August 15–16, 1862
Location	Jackson County, near Lone Jack, Missouri
Result	Confederate victory

Belligerents
United States (Union)	(Confederate States of America) CSA (Confederacy)

Commanders and leaders
Emory S. Foster	Vard Cockrell

Strength
800	1,500–3,000

Casualties and losses
160	118

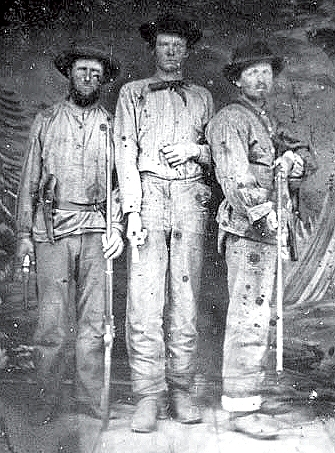
Thomas H. Brown, William Brown and Abe Brown, Confederate soldiers who fought at the Battle of Lone Jack

The Battle of Lone Jack took place during the American Civil War on August 15–16, 1862 in Jackson County, Missouri. The battle was part of the Confederate guerrilla and recruiting campaign in Missouri in 1862.

== Background ==
During the summer of 1862 many Confederate and Missouri State Guard recruiters were dispatched north from Arkansas into Missouri to replenish the depleted ranks of the Trans-Mississippi Confederacy. In Western/West-Central Missouri these included then Captain Jo Shelby, Colonel Vard Cockrell, Colonel John T. Coffee, Upton Hays, John Charles Tracy, John T. Hughes, and DeWitt C. Hunter. Most of these commands were working independently and there was no clear sense of seniority yet established. On August 11 the Federal commander General John Schofield was stunned to learn that Independence, Missouri had fallen to a combined force of Colonel John T. Hughes, William Quantrill, Gideon W. Thompson and Upton Hays. Schofield ordered General James Totten to concentrate his forces to deal with the threat.

== Skirmish ==
On August 15, 1862 Union Major Emory S. Foster, under orders from Totten, led a 740-man combined force from Lexington to Lone Jack. Other forces were dispatched from Kansas under General James G. Blunt (2,500 men) and Missouri under General Fitz Henry Warren (600 men), but they would not arrive in time for the engagement. Upon reaching the Lone Jack area, Foster received intelligence that 1,600 rebels under Col. Coffee and Lt. Col. Tracy were camped near town and prepared to attack them. The estimate of the rebel command was revised down to only 800 and at about 11:00 p.m., Foster and his men attacked the Confederate camp and dispersed the enemy. The firing of his cannon during this brief skirmish proved to be Foster's undoing, for it alerted Colonel Vard Cockrell and other rebel commands in the area of Foster's position and intent to fight. Foster's men returned to town to rest along the main street, having spent several days in the saddle. Colonel Cockrell conferred with Upton Hays, Lt. Col. Sidney D. Jackman, and DeWitt C. Hunter and determined to give battle the next morning with the intent of overwhelming the much smaller Union force.

== Battle ==
Cockrell's plan was to clandestinely deploy Hunter, Jackman and Tracy's forces in a field to the west of town well before sunrise on August 16 and await the opening of the fight. Hays was to initiate the battle with a mounted attack from the north as daylight approached, whereupon the others would launch a surprise flank attack. Hays did not attack as early as planned, instead reconnoitering the other commands before advancing. As daylight appeared Foster's pickets became aware of Hays' advance. This gave Foster's men a brief opportunity to deploy, spoiling the element of surprise.

With sunrise exposing them while awaiting Hays' tardy advance, Jackman, Hunter, and Tracy attacked but were held in check. Hays then performed a dismounted attack from the north. Together his force and Tracy's crumpled the Union right flank, forcing the 7th Missouri Cavalry (commanded by Captain Milton H. Brawner) back onto the artillery. The cannoneers now began a desperate fight. Union Captain Long's 2nd Battalion Missouri State Militia Cavalry concealed behind a hedge row of Osage orange trees poured a crossfire on the Confederates, temporarily repulsing them.

On the other side of the field Hunter's force was stalled by three companies of Captain Plumb's 6th Missouri State Militia Cavalry. A mounted force (possibly Coffee's) approached on Hunter's flank and he mistook them for Federals. The mounted men attacked but were surprised and repulsed by fire from Capt. Slocum's company of the 7th Missouri State Militia Cavalry behind another Osage orange hedge. Hunter, now short of ammunition, abandoned the field for the ammunition train, exposing Jackman's flank. Jackman was also short of ammunition and retired as well.

Tracy's and Hays' commands renewed their attack to the north, eventually displacing the Indiana artillerists. With no remaining Confederate threat to the south, Captain Plumb now counterattacked to the north, reclaiming the artillery. Jackman and Hunter's resupplied men then returned to the field. Hays attempted to counterattack but a counter-charge by Plumb forced him to retreat. Much of the fighting then devolved into a war of attrition between Confederates on the western side of the street, Union men on the right with their artillery in the middle. The artillerists were soon routed and the guns changed hands several times. Foster recaptured the guns a final time, being severely wounded himself in the process.

After five hours of fighting and the loss – by wounding – of Foster, rebel Col. Coffee and his 800 men reappeared north of town causing Foster's successor, Capt. Milton H. Brawner, to order a retreat. The men left the field in good order and returned to Lexington. The cannon were hastily spiked or disabled and hidden before the Federals departed. The Confederates secured a victory, but the approach of Union forces including Blunt and Fitz Henry Warren forced the Rebels to withdraw on August 17. General Fitz Warren occupied the town that day.

Foster was later criticized for attacking on the first day while being outnumbered and for not awaiting reinforcement. However, Fitz Warren's command did not arrive until two days later, and Blunt's three days after Foster arrived. The Federals fought more vigorously because many believed Quantrill's Raiders were present and would be brutal to prisoners.

== Casualties & aftermath ==
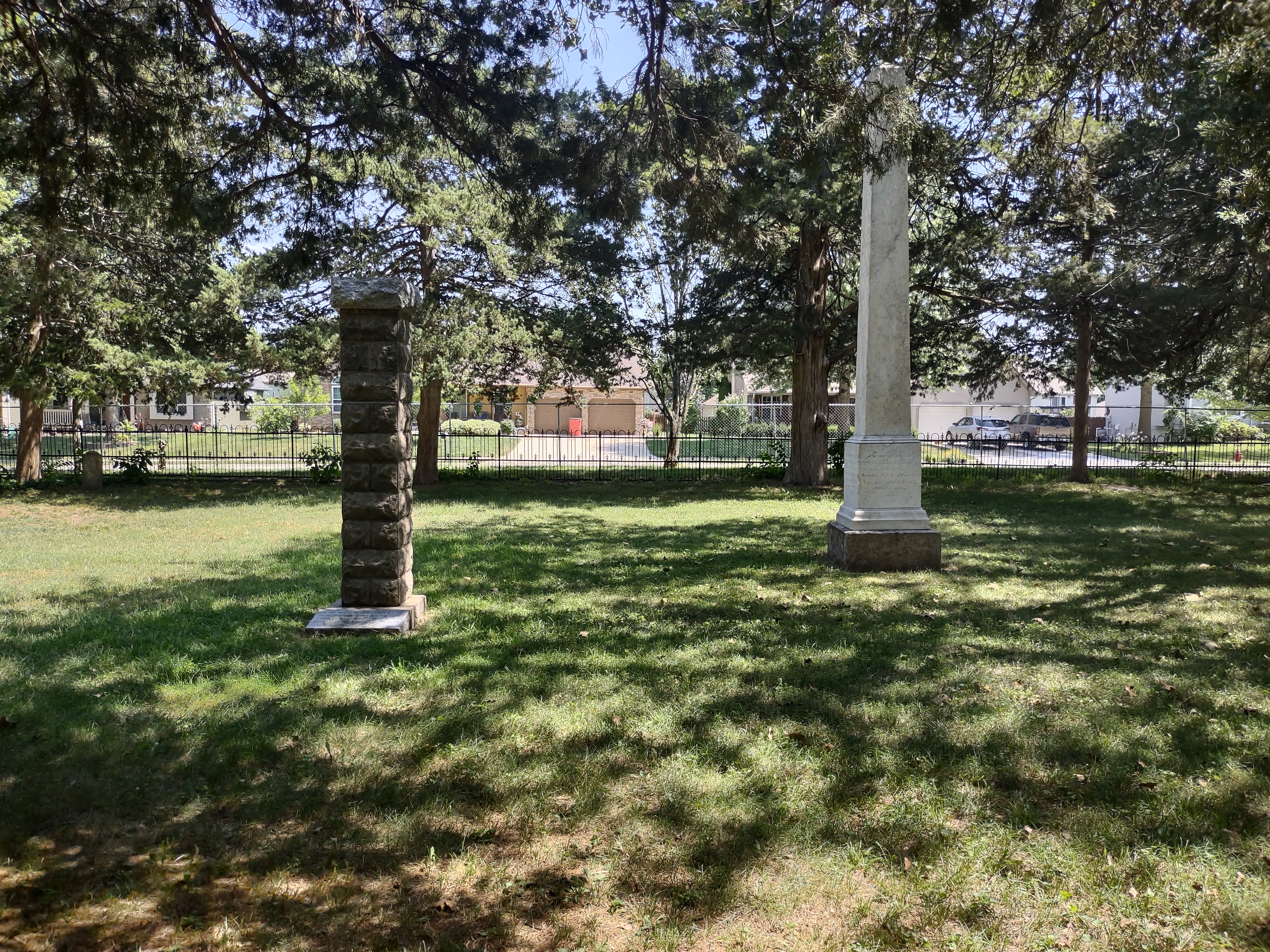
The Lone Jack battlefield in 2023. The monument to the left is for the Union troops, and the one to the right for the Confederates

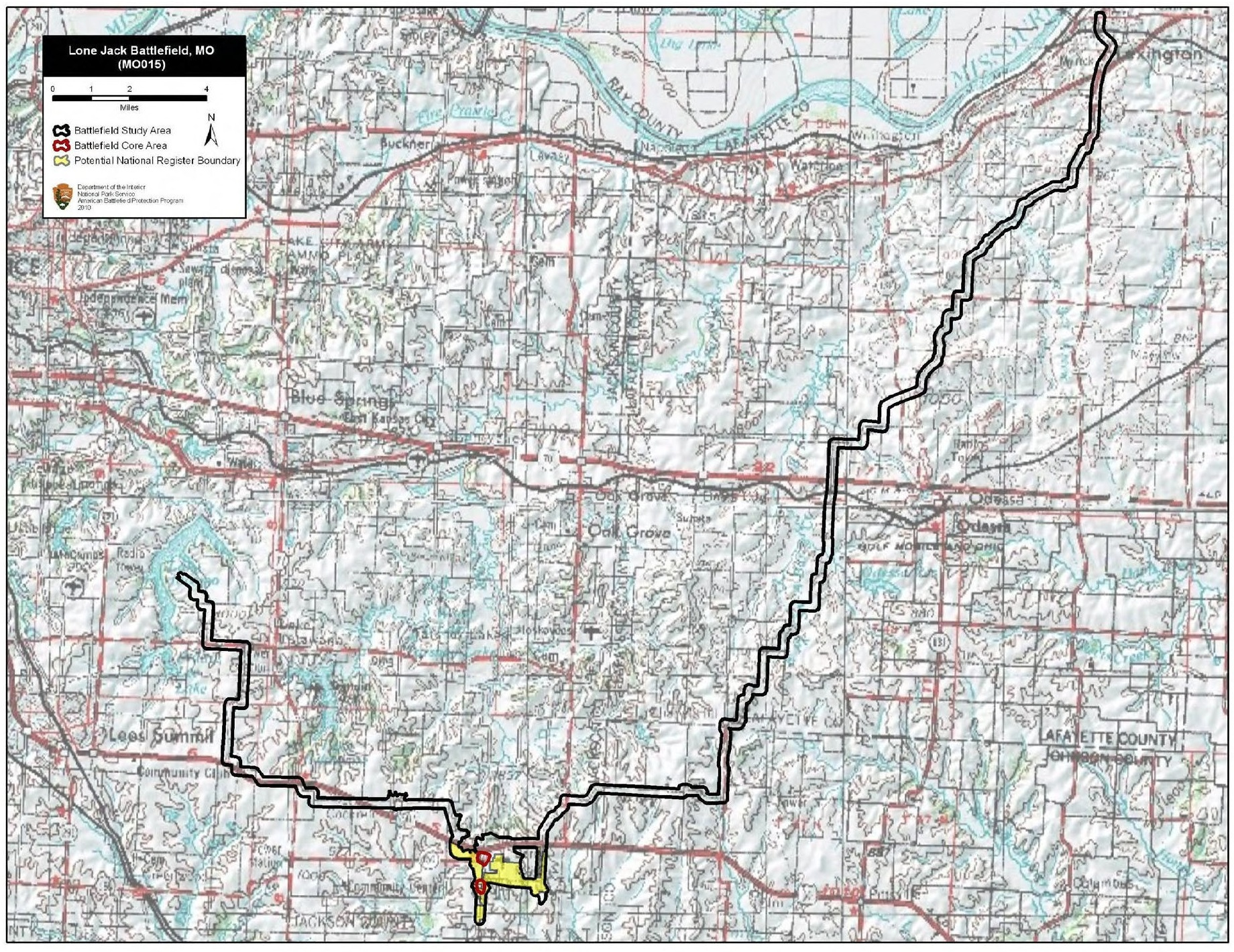
Map of Lone Jack Battlefield core and study areas by the American Battlefield Protection Program

Federal Capt. Brawner reported Union losses as 43 killed, 154 wounded, and 75 missing/captured, a casualty rate of 34 percent and this was almost certainly too low. Rebel Colonel Hunter reported burying 119 Federals and 47 Rebels, but the true losses are unknown. Excluded from Hunter's total were an unknown number of dead Confederates claimed by their friends and families for burial elsewhere. A recent roll call list of Federals killed at the action as compiled in service records by Wayne Schnetzer reveals 65 killed and at least 29 who later died from wounds received at Lone Jack. The list of known Confederate participation and deaths is less complete, but at least 55 names are listed as killed, with at least 4 others later succumbing to their wounds.

Colonel Cockrell succeeded in locating the two cannon and removed them from the field and back to Arkansas. One was later credited with firing the shot that disabled the Queen City on the White River. Because they were in possession of the field, the Confederate recruits gained a substantial quantity of needed firearms. As many as half of the recruits were initially unarmed.

This was the only Civil War battle fought by future Secretary of War and U.S. Senator Stephen B. Elkins. Elkins was to say that he disgusted of war after what he witnessed in the battle:

I saw one battle while in the service, that of Lone Jack, and a most awful battle it was. Col. Emory S. Foster had a Union regiment which was attacked by the brother of Senator Cockrell, but Foster thought the Confederates were the guerrilla hands who raised the black flag, and never gave any quarter. So he refused to surrender, and every one of his officers was picked off. The guerrillas were victorious. I went over the battlefield afterward, the blood, the cries for water and death, the naked bodies stripped of their clothing, the dead horses which served for ramparts, gave me a disgust for war, which makes it seem strange that I am here at the head of the war department of this great government.

== Cole Younger ==
Confederate guerrilla and later outlaw leader Thomas Coleman Younger was notable for his actions at Lone Jack. Though most of Quantrill's Raiders were still in Independence, Missouri, looting after victory in the First Battle of Independence, 18-year-old Cole Younger was present at Lone Jack riding along the front lines to supply the troops. The wounded Foster was briefly held by the Confederates in a cabin and was threatened with execution by a Confederate officer who had been his bitter enemy since before the war. Younger physically pushed Foster's would-be executioner, Dr. Josiah Hatcher Caldwell, out of the cabin, despite the fact that Caldwell was a ranking officer in the CSA. When Younger was captured in the James-Younger Gang robbery of the Northfield, Minnesota First National Bank, Foster (who was then editor of the St. Louis Evening Journal) argued for clemency for Younger.

== Popular culture ==
In the 1969 movie True Grit, character Rooster Cogburn (played by John Wayne) tells Mattie Ross that he lost an eye at the Battle of Lone Jack, calling it "a scrap outside of Kansas City."

== Order of battle ==
Union: Major Emory S. Foster

- 7th Missouri Volunteer Cavalry (companies A, C, E, F, I) – Capt. Milton H. Brawner, 265 men.
- 6th Missouri State Militia Cavalry (Companies A, B, E) – Capt. W. Plumb, 149 men.
- 8th Missouri State Militia Cavalry (Companies F, H) – 140 men.
- 2nd Battalion Missouri State Cavalry (Companies A, C, F) – Capt. J.H. Long, 81 men.
- 7th Missouri State Militia Cavalry (Company H) – Capt. E. Slocum, 69 men.
- 3rd Indiana Artillery (1 section of two 12-pounder James Rifles) – 2Lt. James S. Develin/Sgt. James M. Scott, 36 men.

Union order of battle, officers and strengths from Banasik's Embattled Arkansas.

Confederate: Colonel Jeremiah "Vard" Cockrell

- Hays Regiment recruits – Col. Upton Hays, 400 men.
- Hunter's Regiment recruits – Col. DeWitt C. Hunter, 750 men.
- Jackman's Regiment recruits – Lt. Col. Sidney Drake Jackman, 450 men.
- Tracy's Regiment recruits – Lt. Col. John Charles Tracy, 350 men.
- Coffee's Regiment recruits – Col. John T. Coffee, 800 men (arrived at end of action).

Confederate order of battle from "Shot All to Pieces" by Matt Matthews and Kip Lindberg.

== Sources ==
- http://historiclonejack.org
- https://web.archive.org/web/20070928114835/http://www.lstourism.com/battle.htm
- U.S. National Park Service Lone Jack Battle Summary
- CWSAC Report Update
