= Battle of Mount Elba =

1864 battle of the American Civil War

- Part of the American Civil War
Date	March 30, 1864
Location	Near Mount Elba, Arkansas 33.8509855°N 92.232298°W
Result	Union victory

Belligerents
United States (Union)	Confederate States

Commanders and leaders
(United States) Col. Powell Clayton	(Confederate States of America) Brig. Gen. Thomas Dockery

Casualties and losses
4	130

The Battle of Mount Elba (March 30, 1864) was fought near Mount Elba, Arkansas, as part of the Camden Expedition, during the American Civil War.

== Prelude ==
As a supporting effort to the Camden Expedition, to help fix Confederate forces at Monticello, Arkansas, and prevent them from opposing Steel's march to Camden, Arkansas, Colonel Powell Clayton conducted a raid on Longview, Arkansas, a port on the Saline, southwest of Monticello. Clayton's cavalry force crossed the Saline at Mount Elba, after sweeping aside a small guard force.

Clayton divided his forces and sent part to establish a blocking position to the west near Marks Mill. One hundred picked men under lieutenants Greathouse and Young were then dispatched to destroy the Confederate pontoon bridge at Longview, Arkansas. On March 29, the lieutenants surprised and captured approximately 250 soldiers belonging to Brigadier General Thomas P. Dockery's brigade at Longview.

== Battle ==
Confederate forces in the area were now alerted to the presence of Clayton's raiders and attempted to cut off Clayton's command by attacking their bridgehead at Mount Elba on March 30, 1864. Clayton was successful in re-crossing the Saline, defeating Confederate forces at the Battle of Mount Elba and returned to Pine Bluff, Arkansas, with over 260 prisoners. The Union's casualties throughout the expeditions were only two dead and eight missing. The first Union action of the Union expedition was a complete success, but the rest of the expedition would not go as planned.
