= Sidney D. Jackman =

Sidney Drake Jackman
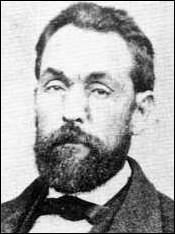
- Sidney Drake Jackman
- Born: March 7, 1826 or March 21, 1828; Jessamine County, Kentucky
- Died: June 2, 1886 (aged 60); Hays County, Texas
- Burial place: Kyle Cemetery
- Military career
- Allegiance: United States of America; Confederate States of America
- Branch: Confederate Army
- Service years: 1861–65
- Rank: Colonel, CSA; Assigned to duty as: Brigadier General
- Conflicts: American Civil War
- Other work: farmer, legislator, law enforcement

Sidney Drake Jackman (March 7, 1826 or March 21, 1828 – June 2, 1886) was an American farmer, teacher, and soldier. He served as an officer in the Confederate Army during the American Civil War, most noted for his performance in the early part of the Battle of Westport in 1864.

After the war, Jackman fled to Mexico, then returned to the United States. He again took up farming, served as a state legislator, and later entered law enforcement.

== Early life and career ==
Jackman was born in Jessamine County, Kentucky, in the spring of either 1826 or 1828, the son of Thomas Jackman and his wife Mary Drake. Sometime in 1830, the family moved to Howard County, Missouri, where Sidney Jackman was taught some basic schooling. By late in the 1840s he was living in Boone County, Missouri, where he look up work as a schoolteacher as well as farming. On February 18, 1849, Jackman married his first wife, Martha Rachael Slavin, in Boone County, and they had two daughters and four sons together.

Soon after getting married Jackman moved his family to Howard County, Missouri, and in 1855 they settled in Papinville, located in Bates County. In both locales Jackman again was farming and teaching. Jackman organized local militias while in Papinville to deal with "Jayhawker" and other raids from nearby Kansas, and in 1860 he relocated his family further into Missouri's interior to try to avoid these troubles. By the time of the American Civil War, Jackman was a captain in the Missouri State Militia.

== Civil War service ==
Jackman chose to follow the Confederate cause in 1861 and entered the Missouri State Guard. In May 1862, he led cavalry troops in the raid of Neosho, Missouri. In the summer of 1862, was authorized to raise a cavalry regiment of Missourians in Arkansas. Finding this slow going, he obtained permission to recruit in Missouri. On August 16 Jackman fought at the Battle of Lone Jack, where he led troops that helped defeat the Union forces occupying Lone Jack, Missouri. While this unit was originally mounted, upon its return to Arkansas it was dismounted by Maj. Gen. Thomas C. Hindman. It was mustered into Confederate service on August 31 in Arkansas under Col. Jackman. It was designated the 7th, then the 16th Missouri Infantry. On October 25, 1862, Jackman resigned to resume recruiting in Missouri.

Jackman served in the Trans-Mississippi Theater of the American Civil War, mainly participating in irregular guerilla style tactics against Union targets. By the fall and winter of 1862, Jackman had successfully recruited enough troops to aid the regular Confederate Army raids into Missouri. On January 11, 1863, his men entered Union-held Columbia, hoping to free Confederates in the city's jail, but the attempt failed. On April 23, Jackman and his troopers kidnapped Missouri Militia (Union) Brig. Gen. Thomas J. Bartholow and then set up camp at Glasgow. On June 1, Jackman's small command encountered and defeated a group of Federal cavalry, where he reportedly shot the leader of the Union horsemen.

In May 1864, Jackman and his men entered Arkansas and were based near the Boston Mountains in the northwest part of the state. By June, he had recruited a cavalry regiment that was to be called "Jackman's Missouri Cavalry" which was added to Brig. Gen. Joseph Shelby's cavalry division of Maj. Gen. Sterling Price's Army of Missouri in the Trans-Mississippi Department. That fall, Jackman's command (a cavalry brigade consisting of two regiments and two battalions of raw recruits) participated in Price's Raid. During the first stages of the raid Jackman led the attack and capture of Union-held Glasgow.

=== Westport ===
Jackman fought in the Union victory at the Battle of Westport near modern-day Kansas City, Missouri, on October 22 – 23, 1864, one of the war's largest clash of mounted troops. During the first day of the battle, he led the attack that routing the Federals from their initial position, and early on second day his brigade launched a successful attack directly on Westport. When the Confederate rear collapsed during his attack he was ordered to halt and act as rear guard to fend off the Union pursuit.

Two days later in Kansas at the Battle of Mine Creek, Jackman's cavalry was ordered to guard Price's supply trains and thus missed the Confederate defeat and resulting rout, though his brigade succeeded in slowing the Federal pursuit.

During his raids and skirmishes Union soldiers had taken his family into custody in 1865, as "retribution for his guerilla activities." At first, they were held in St. Louis, Missouri, later moved to Natchez, Mississippi, and finally held at Alexandria, Louisiana, until the end of the war.

On May 10, 1865, Jackman was promoted to the rank of brigadier general by the commander of the Trans-Mississippi Department, Gen. Edmund Kirby Smith; however his appointment was never confirmed by the Confederate Congress.

== Postbellum ==
With the collapse of the Confederate States in 1865, Jackman and some of his men decided not to surrender and headed for Mexico. Along the way, Jackman reunited with his now-released family in Shreveport, Louisiana, and proceeded with them toward Texas and the border. Near the end of 1865 they arrived in the city of San Marcos, located in Hays County, Texas. Jackman entered northern Mexico, leaving his family in Texas while he ascertained whether to relocate there. Deciding against it, he crossed back into the United States and surrendered to Federal authorities in San Antonio. Taken to New Orleans, Louisiana, took the loyalty oath to the U.S. Government, and was subsequently paroled.

During 1867 Jackman bought a ranch near Kyle, Texas, and settled his family there, farming and raising cattle. He and his wife helped found the First Christian Church, Disciples of Christ, and he later was a Blanco Chapel Free School trustee. His wife of 21 years, Martha, died in 1870. In 1873 Jackman won election as representative to the Fourteenth Texas Legislature. Jackman remarried in 1875 to Cass (Kyle) Gains, a widow, and they had two sons and two daughters together.

On March 17, 1885, Jackman was appointed the U.S. Marshal for western Texas by U.S. President Grover Cleveland. He held this post until his death at his home in Kyle in June 1886. He is buried in the town's Kyle Cemetery.

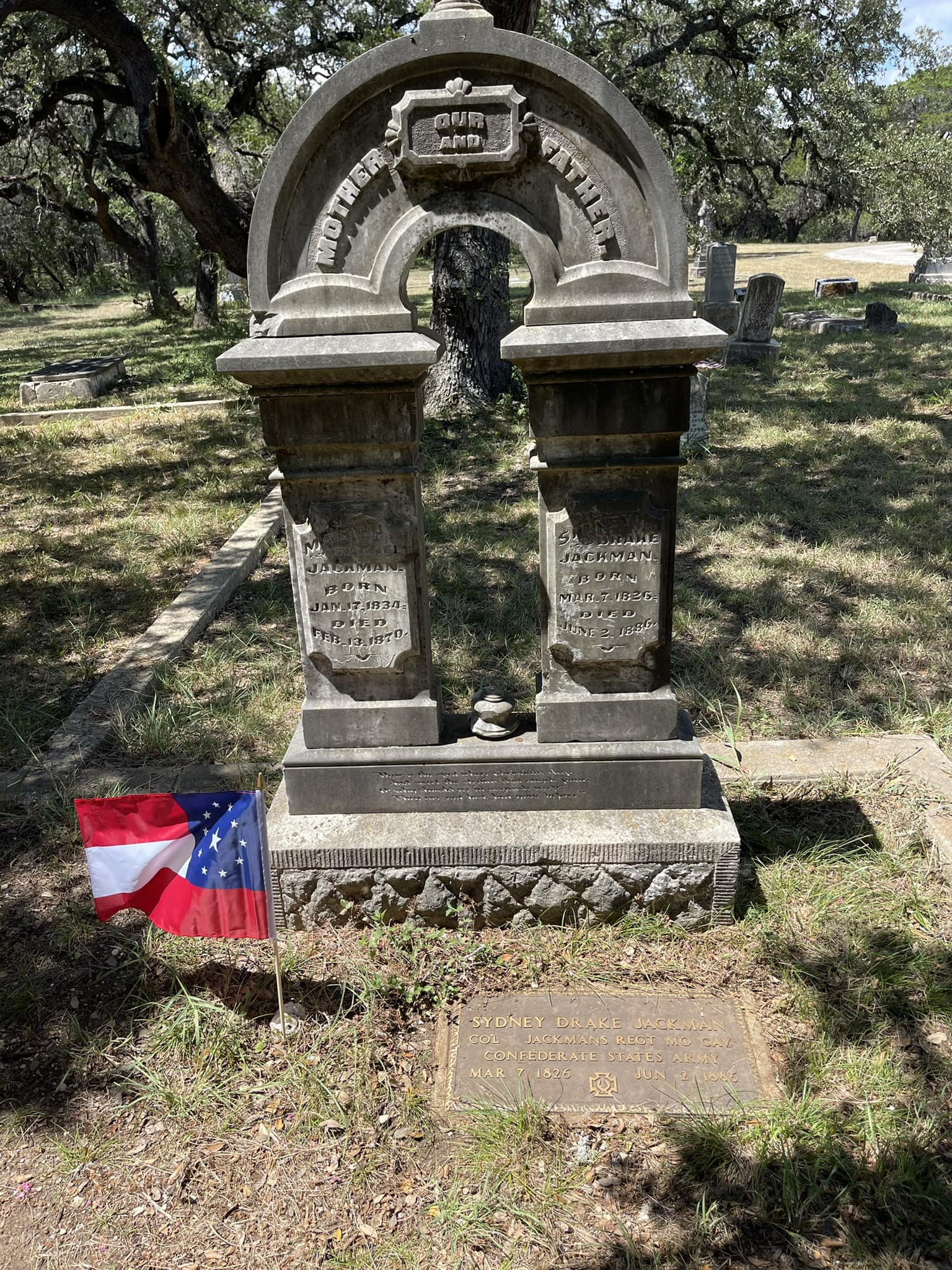
Grave of Brevet Brigadier General Sidney Drake Jackman

== See also ==
- List of American Civil War generals (Acting Confederate)
