= Upton Hays =

Confederate Army officer (1832–1862)

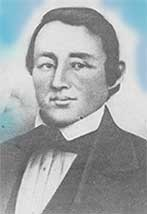
- Born: March 29, 1832; Caldwell County, Kentucky
- Died: September 15, 1862 (aged 30); Newtonia, Missouri
- Military career
- Allegiance: Confederate States of America
- Branch: Confederate States Army
- Service years: 1861–62
- Rank: Colonel
- Conflicts: American Civil War: Battle of Carthage; First Battle of Independence; Battle of Lone Jack

Upton Hays, sometimes spelled Hayes, (March 29, 1832 – September 15, 1862) was a colonel of the Confederate States Army during the American Civil War.

== Early life, career, and border warfare ==
Upton Hays was born in Caldwell County, Kentucky. His father was Boone Hays, and his great-grandfather was famed explorer Daniel Boone. Boone Hays settled in Jackson County, Missouri in 1837, later taking his sons to California in 1850 during the gold rush. However, he died of pneumonia during the trip. Upton Hays never received any formal education, though he was taught to read and write.

After Boone Hays died, his sons returned to Missouri, and Upton Hays married Margaret Jane Watts on February 4, 1852, in Jackson County near Westport. He farmed there and served as a wagonmaster and freight hauler. Hays owned one slave, and managed he six others for his mother-in-law, Elizabeth Watts. Hays was associated with the Border Ruffians, including the future guerrilla leader William Quantrill during the Bleeding Kansas era of cross-border warfare. He voted for John C. Breckinridge for president and Claiborne Fox Jackson for governor in the election of 1860.

== Civil War service ==
When the Civil War began, Hays enlisted the Missouri State Guard as the captain of a cavalry company. He commanded his men at the 1861 Battle of Carthage. Hays and noted guerrilla Dick Yager conducted a raid against Gardner, Kansas, on October 2, 1861, as part of the cycle of cross-border raids by the pro-Union Jayhawkers and the pro-Confederate Border Ruffians. By December 1861, the Jayhawkers had burned Hays' home to the ground. That same month he was elected lieutenant colonel of the 1st Cavalry Regiment, VIII Division, Missouri State Guard.

In June 1862, Hays led a recruiting detail from Arkansas into Western Missouri. He skirmished with pursuing Federals and dislocated his shoulder, forcing him to disperse his command for a time. On July 30, Hays, with bushwhacker Dick Yager and several others, went to Westport seeking several Northern informers. They killed a discharged German-American soldier and seized a large United States flag from a local resident.

At the First Battle of Independence in August 1862, Upton assumed command after the death of Brigadier General John T. Hughes and the wounding of Colonel Gideon W. Thompson. The battle was a Confederate victory, but they were unable to follow up in any major way.

Colonel Hays led the main attack at the Battle of Lone Jack. However, other Confederate commanders complained that his attack was unnecessarily delayed, and thus lost the element of surprise. Nevertheless, the battle was another Confederate victory.

After winning at Lone Jack, the Confederates withdrew closer to Arkansas for supplies. On September 12, 1862, Near Newtonia, Missouri, or 15, Colonel Hays attempted to personally drive in some Union pickets and was killed by a bullet to the head. According to a participant, he had been elected colonel of his consolidated regiment the previous day.
