= John T. Coffee =

American politician (1816–1890)

John Trousdale Coffee
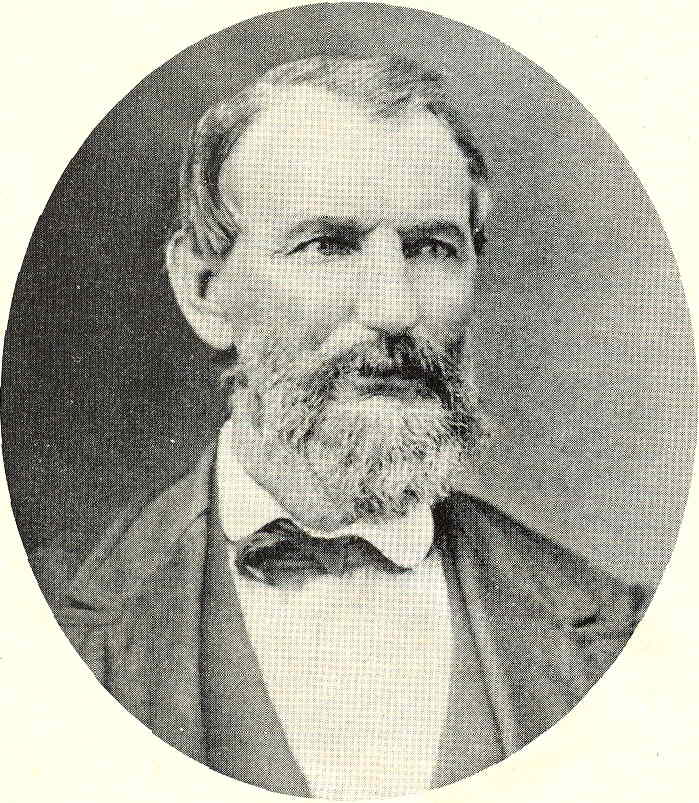

Speaker of the Missouri House of Representatives
- In office 1858–1859
- Preceded by: James Chiles
- Succeeded by: Christian Kribben

Personal details
- Born: December 14, 1816 Smith County, Tennessee, U.S.
- Died: May 23, 1890 (aged 73) Georgetown, Texas, U.S.
- Party: Democratic
- Children: 13

John Trousdale Coffee (December 14, 1816 – May 23, 1890) was an American politician, elected to the State Senate and then to the House, where he was elected as Speaker of the House (1856–1858). During the American Civil War, he served as a Confederate officer in Missouri. In the late war, he moved to Waco, Texas, and later lived in Georgetown, where he practiced law again. He had a total of four wives and thirteen children.

== Early life ==
Coffee was born in Smith County, Tennessee where he taught himself law and was admitted to the bar. He moved to Springfield, Missouri in 1842 following the deaths of his father and first wife.

== Marriage and family ==
Coffee married his first wife in Tennessee. After her death in 1842, he migrated to Missouri, where he married again.

His second wife died in 1845, two weeks after childbirth. That year in September, he married for the third time. By the end of the Civil War, when they had moved to Waco, Texas, he had a total of seven children. After his wife's death, he moved with his family to Georgetown, Texas.

There he married for the fourth time. With his young wife, he had six more children. One daughter, Catherine Jane, married rancher John Wesley Snyder.

== Career ==
Coffee practiced law in Springfield and Bolivar, Missouri.

He raised an army unit to participate in the Mexican–American War (1846–1848), but the war ended while they were en route to New Orleans.

=== Politics ===
Coffee returned to Missouri in 1849, where he was elected as the circuit attorney for Dade County. He lived in Greenfield.

In 1854, he was elected to the Missouri State Senate. He resigned in 1855 to accept a captain position with the First U.S. Army Cavalry Regiment at Fort Leavenworth, Kansas. After serving only four months, he resigned the captain position due to illness and returned to Greenfield.

In 1856, he argued to allow "squatter sovereignty" to solve the Bleeding Kansas problem (the argument was that Missourians should be allowed to vote deciding whether Kansas should be a slave state and they could do that by claiming land in Kansas). In 1857 he was a publisher of the Greenfield Southwest newspaper.

In 1858, Coffee ran again for the Missouri Senate but lost in the Democratic primary to B. H. Cravens. He ran for the Missouri House of Representatives and was elected Speaker of the Missouri House of Representatives in his first term. In 1860 he lost a Democratic primary for Missouri Secretary of State and returned to law practice.

=== Missouri militia ===
With the beginning of the American Civil War, Coffee raised a regiment in Dade County and was commissioned as a colonel in the Confederate Army. After Sterling Price retreated from Missouri, Coffee stayed in the state. He harassed Union troops in skirmishes around Neosho, Missouri. One of his most famous skirmishes was the Battle of Lone Jack.

Coffee's troops were routed by Union troops on August 12, 1863 at Pineville when 60-70 of his men were killed. In October 1863, Coffee's troops captured the Union garrison in his hometown of Greenfield and burned the courthouse. Among the destroyed records was his land deed, which caused him to lose his land claim in Missouri.

After the Pineville conflict, Coffee was passed over for promotion for General Joseph O. Shelby, who was given command of Missouri forces. Coffee left for Arkansas, where he attempted unsuccessfully to recruit a new regiment. In late 1864 or early 1865, he moved to Waco, Texas with his large family.

== Post-Civil War ==
After the surrender of the Confederates, Coffee refused a request by Shelby to continue the fight under the flag of Emperor Maximilian of Mexico. He formally surrendered to George Armstrong Custer on July 26, 1865 in Austin, Texas.

He died in Georgetown, Texas on May 23, 1890.

Preceded by James Chiles	Speaker of the Missouri House of Representatives; 1858– 1859	Succeeded by Christian Kribben
