= John T. Hughes (Confederate officer) =

Confederate Army officer

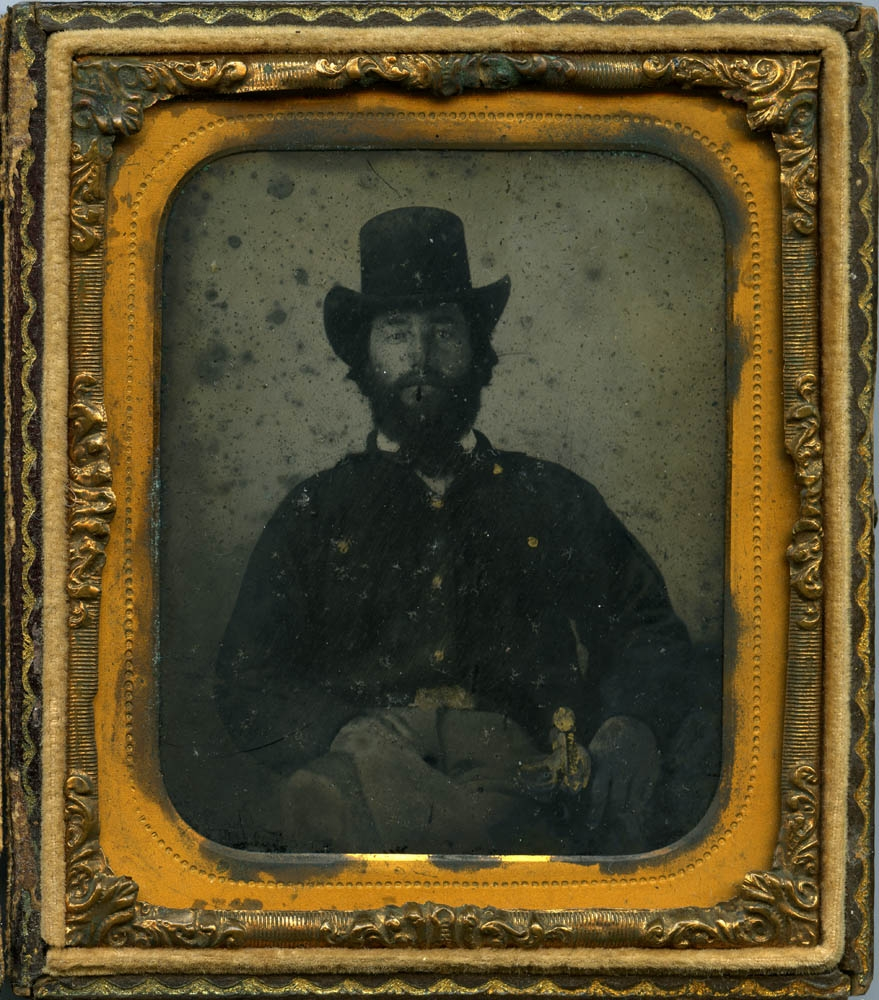
- Born: July 25, 1817; Versailles, Kentucky, U.S.
- Died: August 11, 1862 (aged 45); Independence, Missouri, U.S.
- Military career
- Allegiance: United States of America; Confederate States of America
- Branch: United States Army; Confederate States Army
- Service years: 1846–1847; 1861–1862
- Rank: Brigadier general
- Conflicts: Mexican War; American Civil War: Battle of Carthage; Battle of Wilson's Creek; Siege of Lexington; First Battle of Independence †

John T. Hughes (July 25, 1817 – August 11, 1862) was a Confederate military officer who served as a colonel in the Missouri State Guard and Confederate Army during the American Civil War. He might also have been a brigadier general at the time of his death but documentation of the appointment is lacking.

== Early life career, and Mexican War ==
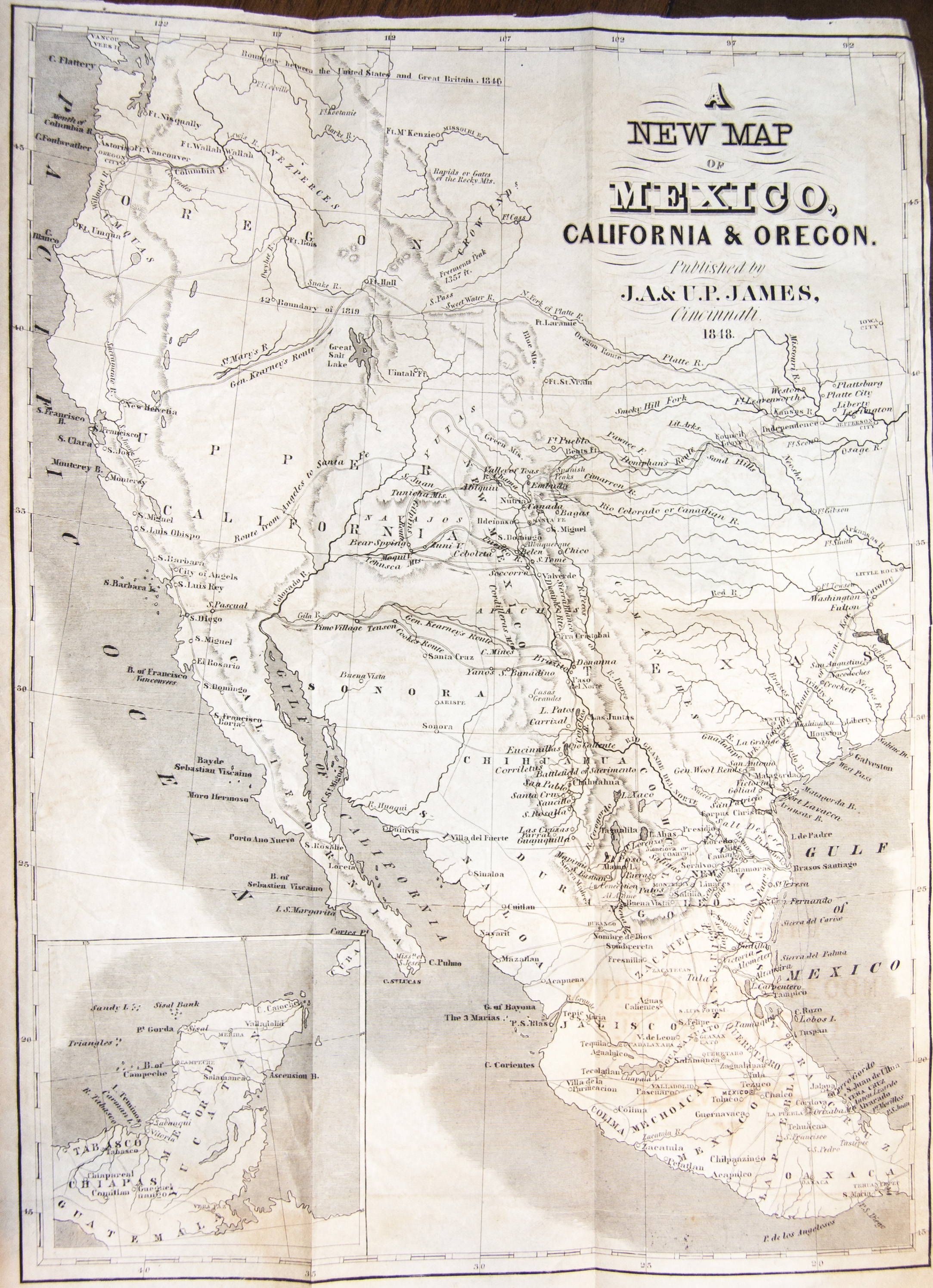
Hughes' A New Map of Mexico, California & Oregon

John Taylor Hughes was born July 25, 1817, near Versailles, Kentucky, to Samuel and Nancy (Price) Hughes. His family moved to Fayette, Missouri, when he was very young. He was an 1844 graduate of Bonne Femme College and taught school until the outbreak of the Mexican War in 1846. He enlisted as a private in the 1st Regiment Missouri Mounted Volunteers of Doniphan's expedition and penned his personal account of the trek upon his discharge in 1847.

Hughes' book provided national fame and following his move to Plattsburg, Missouri in 1848, he became editor of a Clinton County, Missouri, newspaper, the school superintendent, militia colonel, and state representative in 1854. He was also a planter and slaveowner.

== Civil War and death ==
Hughes was a cousin to Sterling Price and like Price professed Conditional Unionism until the Camp Jackson Affair, after which he joined the Missouri State Guard and was elected colonel of the 1st Regiment, 4th Division. He participated in the Battle of Carthage and the Battle of Wilson's Creek. He was slightly wounded in the Siege of Lexington.

At the Battle of Pea Ridge in March 1862, Hughes took over command of a brigade from the wounded Brigadier general William Yarnell Slack. Hughes returned to Missouri in the summer of 1862 to recruit for the Confederacy. At this time he may have been appointed as either an acting Confederate or Missouri State Guard brigadier general. No record of the appointment has been found but he was known as "general."

He, his recruits, and several other recruiting or partisan bands united to attack the garrison of Independence, Missouri, on August 11, 1862, with Hughes in overall command. During this battle (the First Battle of Independence), he was killed instantly by a shot to the head while leading a charge, but the city was captured. He is interred at Woodlawn Cemetery in Independence. He left behind a wife, Mary, and five young sons.

== See also ==
- List of American Civil War generals (Acting Confederate)
