= Jeremiah V. Cockrell =

American politician

Jeremiah Vardaman Cockrell
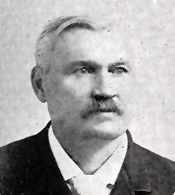
- Cockrell in 1896

Member of the U.S. House of Representatives from Texas's 13th district
- In office March 4, 1893 – March 3, 1897
- Preceded by: District created
- Succeeded by: John H. Stephens

Personal details
- Born: May 7, 1832 Warrensburg, Missouri, U.S.
- Died: March 18, 1915 (aged 82) Abilene, Texas, U.S.
- Party: Democratic

Military service
- Allegiance: Confederate States of America
- Branch/service: Confederate States Army
- Rank: Colonel
- Unit: Missouri State Guard, 8th Division
- Battles/wars: American Civil War

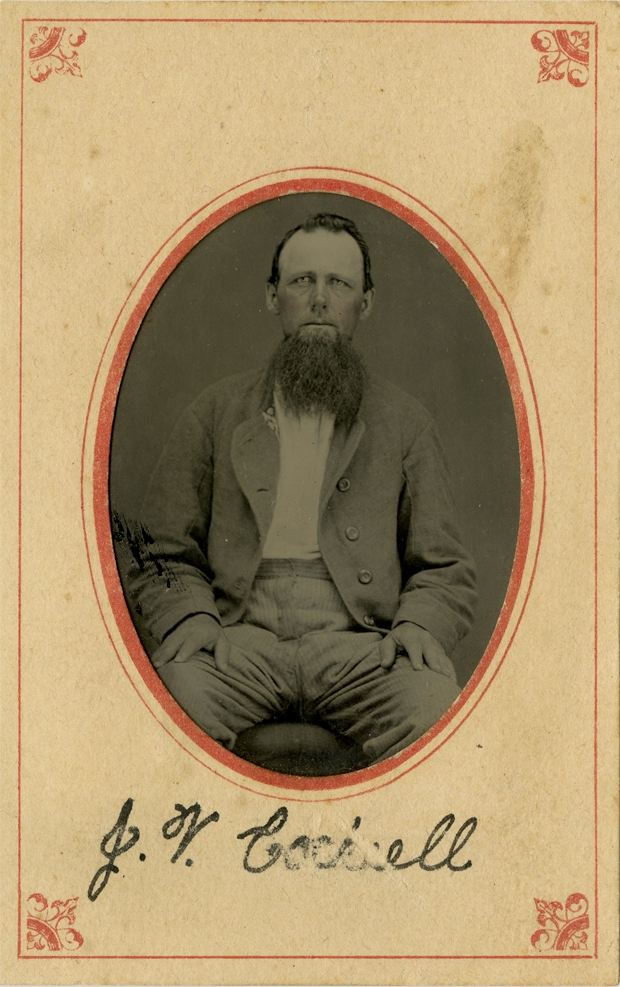
Cockrell in the Civil war

Jeremiah Vardaman Cockrell, also known as Vard Cockrell, (May 7, 1832 – March 18, 1915) was a U.S. representative from Texas, after having served as a field commander in the Confederate States Army during the American Civil War. He was a prominent member of the political South–Cockrell–Hargis family.

== Early life ==
Cockrell was born near Warrensburg, Missouri, to Joseph Cockrell (the sheriff of Johnson County) and Nancy (Ellis) Cockrell, who had migrated there from the Upper South. He attended the common schools and Chapel Hill College in Lafayette County, Missouri. He was the older brother of Francis Marion Cockrell, who also served as a Confederate officer and later as a US Senator from Missouri.

As a young man, Cockrell went to California in 1849 during the Gold Rush. He worked as a miner and a merchant near the Bear River. Cockrell returned to Missouri in 1853, where he engaged in agricultural pursuits, studied law and, for a time, was a minister in the Methodist Church.

== Marriage and family ==
On April 7, 1852, he married Maranda "Jane" Douglas. They had five children together.

== Civil War ==
Cockrell entered the Missouri State Guard and then later joined the Confederate States Army as a lieutenant. He served throughout the Civil War, attaining the rank of colonel. Cockrell served in the 8th Division of the Missouri State Guard at the Battle of Carthage, the Battle of Wilson's Creek and the Siege of Lexington. He was nominally in command at the Battle of Lone Jack, Missouri, in August 1862. In October 1862, he led a skirmish of State Guard and guerrillas (with Bill Truman) against Kansas forces at the Skirmish at Island Mound in Bates County, Missouri. This was the first time that a regiment of African Americans engaged in combat against Confederate forces; they held their ground and helped achieve Union victory. In 1864 Cockrell was wounded so severely that he could not return to field duty.

== Post-war and politics ==
At the close of the war, Cockrell settled with his family in Sherman, Texas, where he practiced law. He was appointed as Chief Justice of Grayson County, Texas, in 1872. He served as delegate to the Democratic state conventions in 1878 and 1880.

He and his family moved from the northern area to Jones County, in the center of Texas. There he was appointed judge of the Thirty-ninth judicial district court in 1885. He was elected to the position in 1886 and re-elected in 1890.

In 1892, Cockrell was elected as a Democrat to the U.S. Congress, where he served until 1897. He was not a candidate for renomination in 1896. He returned to engage in farming and stock raising in Jones County.

Cockrell died in Abilene, Texas on March 18, 1915, at the age of 82. He was interred in the Masonic Cemetery. His son, Joseph E. Cockrell, founded the Southern Methodist University School of Law.

== Sources ==
- United States Congress. "Jeremiah V. Cockrell (id: C000577)". Biographical Directory of the United States Congress. Retrieved on 2009-5-12

U.S. House of Representatives
Preceded by District created	Member of the U.S. House of Representatives from Texas's 13th congressional district 1893–1897	Succeeded by John H. Stephens
