= 4th Arkansas Field Battery =

- Active: 1862–1865
- Disbanded: May 22, 1865
- Country: Confederate States of America
- Allegiance: CSA
- Branch: Artillery
- Size: battery
- Engagements: American Civil War: Prairie Grove Campaign; Battle of Prairie Grove; Battle of Van Buren; Red River Campaign; Battle of Pleasant Hill; Battle of Mansfield; Battle of Mansura; Battle of Yellow Bayou

The 4th Arkansas Field Battery (1862–1865) was a Confederate States Army artillery battery during the American Civil War. The battery spent its entire existence in the Department of the Trans-Mississippi, including time in the Indian Territory. Late in the war the battery supported operations in Louisiana. It was also known as the Desha County Artillery and West's Battery.

== Formation ==
West's Battery was formed during the spring of 1862 and for a time served in the District of the Indian Territory. It was led by Captain Henry Clay West. Captain West had previously served as the 1st Lieutenant of Woodruff's Weaver Light Artillery of Pulaski County. The other battery officers were First Lieutenant Dan J. Murphy; Second Lieutenant Benjamin B. Brett; Third Lieutenant John J. Brooks. Lieutenant Brett resigned in the early part of the war, and Lieutenant Brooks succeeded him, the place of the latter being filled by Third Lieutenant Peter Dumas.

At the time that Lieutenant West learned that he had been elected captain of a battery organized from Desha County, he was at Fort Smith with the Weaver Light Artillery and the new Desha County battery was report to be at Dardanelle. West joined the unit at Dardanelle and eventually moved the unit to Indian Territory where it was joined in an artillery battalion with the Weaver Light Artillery under the command of Major Woodruff.

West's battery spent the remainder of the winter and spring in Indian Territory. When Major General Thomas C. Hindman assumed command of the Department of the Trans-Mississippi on May 31, 1862, one of his first acts was to order General Pike to return first Woodruff's Battery and eventually West Battery to Arkansas. This action touched off a bitter struggle between Brigadier General Pike and Major General Hindman that ultimately resulted in Pike demanding to be relieved of command of the Indian Territory.

In an August 1, 1862, telegraph from Major General Thomas C. Hindman to Colonel Charles A. Carroll at Fort Smith, Arkansas, giving him direction to divide two bronze guns obtained from Fort McCulloch in Indian Territory and the six guns of Wests battery between Colonel Carrol, Colonel Cooper and Brigadier General Rains. Hindman gave further instructions on August 8, 1862, when he instructed Colonel Cooper to choose between West's Battery and Howell's battery take three of the bronze guns. On the same day Hindman wrote to Major (former Brigadier General Nicholas Bartlett Pearce of the Confederate Commissary Department at Fort Smith stating, "I want these batteries completely effective by August 25th."

== Service ==
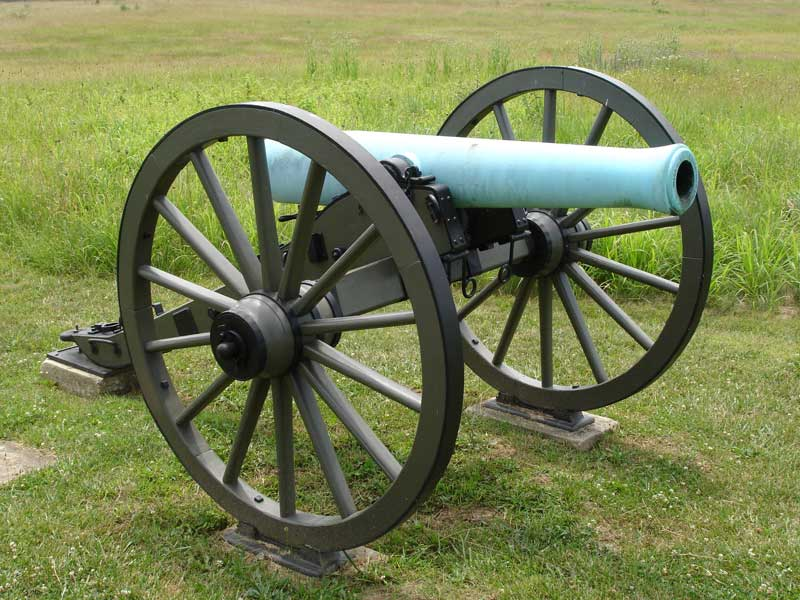
12-pounder Field Gun

The Desha County Artillery was assigned to Colonel Emmett MacDonald's brigade of Brigadier General John S. Marmaduke's division of Major General Thomas C. Hindman's 1st Corps, Army of the Trans-Mississippi during the Prairie Grove Campaign. At that time the battery consisted of sixty-one men, one 6-pounder field gun, and two 12-pounder field guns. The unit did not join Marmaduke's force until after the Battle of Cane Hill on November 28, 1862. According to Captain West's report on the Battle of Prairie Grove, December 7, 1862, Brigadier General Marmaduke ordered the battery to support Brigadier General Fagan's brigade of Shoup's Division. The battery fired in support of Shoup's Division until driven off by the rifled guns of the union artillery. The battery then supported Brigadier General Roan's brigade until nightfall ended the battle.

After Prairie Grove the unit retreated to Van Buren, with the rest of Hindman's Army. As Hindman attempted to reorganize his defeated army, West's battery was assigned to the brigade of Colonel Robert G. Shaver. West's Battery became involved in the Battle of Van Buren, Crawford County, Arkansas, on December 28, 1862, as Union generals James G. Blunt and Francis Herron pursued General Hindman's retreating 1st Corps, Army of the Trans-Mississippi. After Hindman's forces were forced to hastily retreat across the Arkansas River to escape the surprise Union attack, Hindman ordered the battery to shell Union forces in Van Buren. The battery almost struck a decisive below when one of its shells came close to killing both General Blunt and General Herron.

On January 1, Hindman's retreating army was met east of Van Buren by the 15th Texas Cavalry under Colonel J. W. Speight. Speight's regiment accompanied the retiring Confederate forces to Clarksville, Arkansas. At nearby Piney Bayou on January 7, the "four demoralized Texas [dismounted cavalry] regiments were put under command of Col Speight, creating a brigade. On January 10, 1863, West's Arkansas Battery was added to Speight's Texas Brigade. The battery would support Texas troops for the remainder of the war.

General Holmes ordered the Texas brigade back through Fort Smith to reinforce Brigadier General William Steele, the new commander of the Indian Territory. The brigade, including West’s Battery trudged in varying degrees of cold winter rain and snow, short of wagons, across a country already stripped of forage for men and animals. Snow piled up eight to ten inches deep in places, and a hundred mules from the teams for the supply wagons and an artillery battery froze to death. Cattle and oxen were broken to harness to meet the emergency and to bring the guns and supplies through.

The battery remained in Indian Territory until April 19, 1863, when Speight's Texas Brigade and West's battery were ordered to proceed to Alexandria, Louisiana, via Shreveport, Louisiana, to oppose a suspected Union advance into Texas. The Battery arrive in Shreveport Louisiana on May 14, 1863. May 14, 1863.

In the summer of 1863, the battery joined Major General Richard Taylor's District of Western Louisiana. West's battery had two 6-pounder smoothbores and two 12-pounder howitzers on February 12, 1864. By the time of the Red River Campaign in the spring of 1864, the unit was assigned to the division artillery of Brigadier General Jean Jacque Alexander Alfred Mouton's 2nd Infantry Division of Taylor's command. According to Major Joseph L. Brent's report of the Battle of Mansfield, "Henry C. West's & Moseley's Batteries were in reserve in rear of line of battle & beyond them Farris & Barnes were held ready for any emergency." On April 19, the battery had only three guns, a 6-pounder, a 10-pounder Parrott (or 3-inch rifle), and a 12-pounder howitzer. It is unknown what happened to the other 6-pounder and 12-pounder reported in February. The Parrott or 3-inch rifle probably came from the Union cannons captured at Mansfield. The battery then helps harass the retreating Union fleet and army as they attempted to escape the falling waters of the Red River. West's Battery was engaged in the Battle of Mansura, May 16, 1864, and the Battle of Yellow Bayou, May 17, 1864, during the pursuit of Banks fleeing forces.

In July 1864, following the Red River Campaign, the artillery of the District of Western Louisiana was reorganized and West's battery was assigned to Major G. S. Squires, 2nd Battalion of Colonel Bent's Division Artillery.

On September 30, 1864, General E. Kirby Smith, commanding the Confederate Trans-Mississippi Department reported West's Arkansas Battery as assigned to the artillery battalion, commanded by Major William Durbin Blocher, in Major General Thomas J. Churchill's First (Arkansas) Division of Major General John B. Magruder's Second Army Corps, Army of the Trans-Mississippi.

On November 19, 1864, General E. Kirby Smith, issued Special Orders No. 290, organizing the artillery of the department into battalions. The component batteries rarely, if ever, operated together. They were usually assigned individually to an infantry or cavalry brigade to provide fire support. In this reorganization, West's Battery, armed with 4 guns, and still under the command of Captain Henry Clay West was re-designated as the 4th Arkansas Field Battery and assigned to the 5th Artillery Battalion, commanded by Major William Durbin Blocher.

On December 31, 1864, The battery was assigned to Maj. Thomas A. Faries' 3rd Artillery Battalion, in Maj. Gen. Camille Giles de Polignac's 2nd Infantry Division, in Lieutenant General Simon Bolivar Buckner's First Army Corps.

Lieutenant General Richard Taylor offered Captain West the position of Chief of Artillery with the rank of lieutenant-colonel, but West declined, saying that the people of Desha County had sent him this battery to command and he would "remain with it to the close of the war and take the survivors back to their homes".

== Surrender ==
The battery was included in the surrender of General E. Kirby Smith with the Trans-Mississippi Department on May 26, 1865. The date of the military convention between Confederate General Edmund Kirby Smith and Union General Edward Canby for the surrender of the troops and public property in the Trans-Mississippi Department was May 26, 1865, however, it took a while for parole commissioners to be appointed and for public property to be accounted for. As a result, a final report of field artillery which was part of the accounting process, was not completed until June 1, 1865. At the end of the war West's Battery was stationed at Rock Mount, Louisiana, and was armed with four rifled guns, including two 3 inch rifles, one 3.67 inch rifle and one 2.9 inch rifle. Like most Arkansas units in the Trans-Mississippi, the battery did not participate in a formal surrender ceremony, nor did its members report to Shreveport to be paroled as the convention between General Edmund Kirby Smith and General Edward Canby required. Captain West simply disbanded his unit on May 26, 1865, and returned to Arkansas. Captain West and twenty-six of his men surrendered at Pine Bluff, Arkansas, on June 6, 1865.

== See also ==
- List of Confederate units from Arkansas
- Confederate Units by State

== Bibliography ==
- Barr, A. (January 1, 1964). Confederate Artillery in Western Louisiana, 1864. Louisiana History: the Journal of the Louisiana Historical Association, 5, 1, 53–73.
- Barr, A. (1998). Polignac's Texas Brigade. College Station: Texas A & M University Press.
- Goodspeed Publishing Co. (1890). Biographical and historical memoirs of southern Arkansas: Comprising a condensed history of the state ... biographies of its distinguished citizens, a brief descriptive history ... of the counties. Chicago, St. Louis, etc.: Goodspeed Pub. Co.
- Shea, W. L. (2009). Fields of blood: The Prairie Grove Campaign. Chapel Hill: University of North Carolina Press.
- United States. (1961). Compiled service records of Confederate soldiers who served in organizations from the State of Arkansas. Washington [D.C.: National Archives, National Archives and Records Service, General Services Administration.
- U.S. War Department, The War of the Rebellion: a Compilation of the Official Records of the Union and Confederate Armies, U.S. Government Printing Office, 1880–1901.
- Woodruff, W. E. (1903). With the light guns in '61-'65: Reminiscences of eleven Arkansas, Missouri and Texas light batteries, in the civil war. Little Rock, Ark: Central printing company.
