= 3rd Arkansas Field Battery =

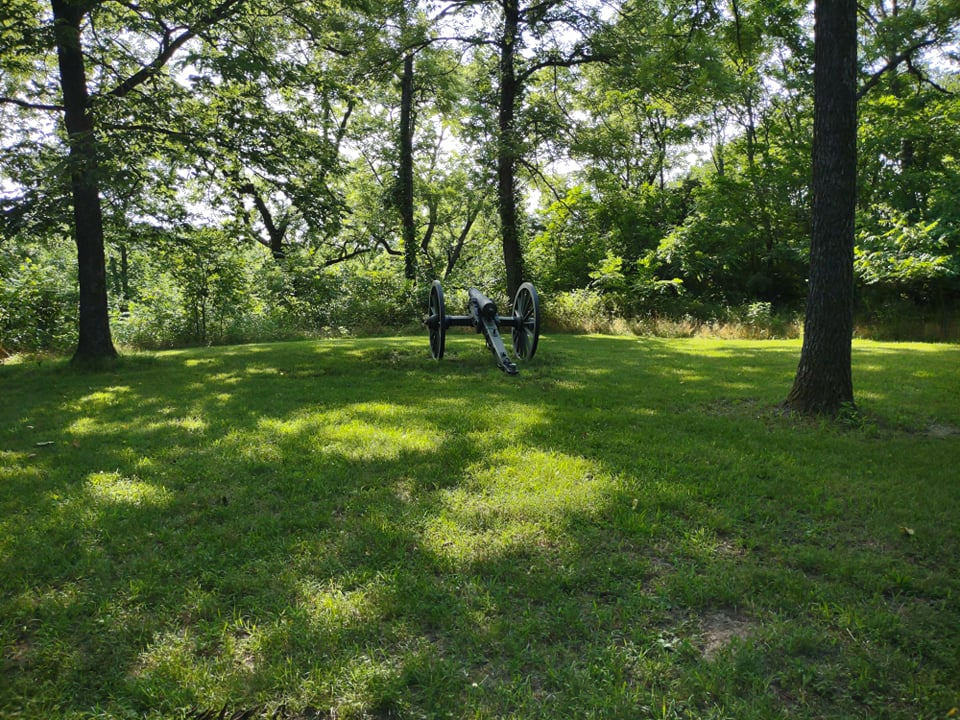
- Cannon marking the position of the 3rd Arkansas Field Battery at Wilson's Creek National Battlefield
- Active: 1860–1865
- Disbanded: May 26, 1865
- Country: Confederate States of America
- Allegiance: CSA
- Branch: Artillery
- Size: battery
- Nicknames: Totten Light Artillery, Pulaski Light Artillery, Weaver Light Artillery
- Engagements: American Civil War: Battle of Wilson's Creek; Battle of Prairie Grove; Battle of Helena; Battle of Little Rock; Red River Campaign

Commanders
- 1860: Captain Robert C Newton
- 1861-1862: Captain William Edward Woodruff, Jr.,
- 1862-1865: John G. Marshall

The 3rd Arkansas Field Battery (1860–1865) was a Confederate Army artillery battery from Pulaski County, Arkansas, during the American Civil War. The battery is also known as the Totten Light Artillery, Pulaski Light Artillery, the Weaver Light Artillery, Woodruff's Battery, and Marshall's Battery. The battery originated as a pre-war Militia company, initially enrolled in state service. After the Battle of Wilson's Creek, the battery was released from state service and eventually reorganized for Confederate Service. The battery provided the initial training for the leaders of numerous other Arkansas artillery batteries during the Civil War. The battery spent its entire service in the Department of the Trans-Mississippi.

== Organization ==
The Pulaski Light Artillery was organized at Little Rock, Pulaski County, Arkansas, in December 1860. This was a time when sectional strife between the Deep South and the northern states caused the young men in many southern cities to form military companies in preparation for what was looking like the inevitability of armed conflict between the North and the South. Little Rock was no different from other southern cities in this respect. In addition to the regular militia, The Militia Law of Arkansas allowed each county to raise up to four Volunteer Companies: one each of infantry, rifles, horse, and artillery. Col. C. Peyton, the commander of the 13th Regiment Arkansas Militia Regiment of Pulaski County certified the election of the officers of Totten's battery.

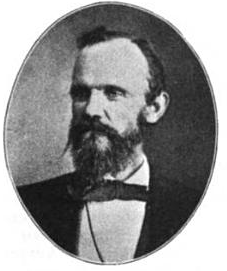
Robert C Newton, first commander of the Pulaski Light Artillery

The company was initially called the Totten Light Artillery, in honor of the popular commander of the United States Arsenal at Little Rock from 1839 to 1860, William Totten. When Totten's son, Captain James Totten, then commanding a U.S. Army artillery battery at the arsenal, cast his lot with the Union, following the seizure of the Little Rock Arsenal, the battery promptly changed its name to the Pulaski Light Artillery. Little did they know that in a few short months they would be facing Totten's guns in battle.

The first mention of the Pulaski Light Artillery came in an article published in the Arkansas State Gazette, on Saturday, December 22, 1860, announcing that, The young men of this city favorably disposed toward a Military organization which may do the 'State some service,' have formed under the title of the 'Pulaski Artillery,' and have elected Rob't C. Newton, Captain; Wm. E. Woodruff, Jr., 1st Lieut.; L. B. Brown, 2d Lieut. and Wm. H. Causin, 3d Lieut. Robert Crittenden Newton, a Little Rock lawyer, resigned in early 1861 and went into the cavalry service, eventually becoming colonel of the 5th Arkansas Cavalry Regiment, CSA. William Edward Woodruff, Jr., the son of the owner and publisher of the Arkansas State Gazette, succeeded Newton as captain.

The Pulaski Light Artillery maintained an armory over the Market House in downtown Little Rock, where they drilled every Monday, Wednesday and Friday afternoon at 3:30, and continued to recruit. There were several volunteer companies organizing in Little Rock in the fall of 1860. Many of the young men from the wealthier families seemed to be attracted to the cavalry service, and the Pulaski Lancers (actually equipped with lances decorated with pennants) attracted its share. The young mechanics and tradesmen of the city seemed to be particularly drawn to the artillery service, and the roster of the Pulaski Light Artillery shows a high percentage of skilled artisans of various trades among its ranks. Apparently the businesses that employed these young men began frowning on their frequent absence from their jobs, causing the following appeal to be printed in the local paper:

... [I]t is desirable that merchants, head mechanics, and others having young men in their employ, belonging to military companies, should grant them leave of absence on the days designated for drills. Business is not so brisk as to require the whole of their time, and it is important that every man in the land who is capable of doing a soldier's duty, should be instructed properly, and hold himself in readiness to respond to the call of his country.

The Battery was armed with two 6 pound smooth bore cannon and two 12 pound smooth bore cannon.

== Service ==
=== Militia service ===
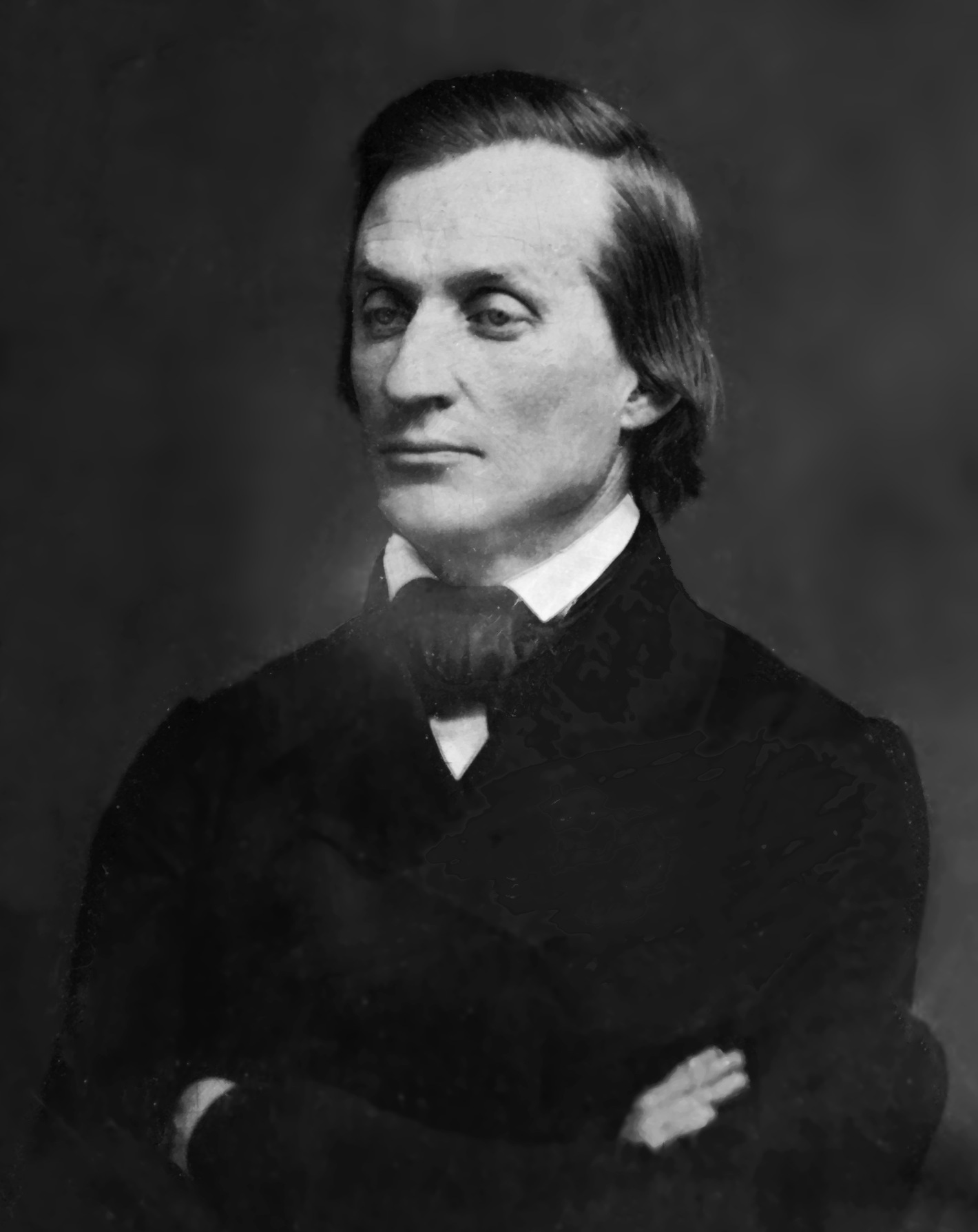
Colonel Solon Borland led a militia battalion, including the Pulaski Light Artillery, to seize the United States Army post at Fort Smith, Arkansas, before Arkansas seceded from the Union

The first military action for the Pulaski Light Artillery came in late April 1861. In order to force the surrender of the United States Army post at Fort Smith, Arkansas, the State of Arkansas organized four of Little Rock's volunteer military companies – Woodruff's "Pulaski Light Artillery," Capt. Thomas James Churchill's "Pulaski Lancers," Capt. Daniel W. Ringo's "Peyton Rifles," and Capt. George W. King's "Little Rock Grays" – along with a nine-member band under Chief Musician Joseph A. Schaer – into a battalion under Colonel Solon Borland. Since Arkansas had not yet seceded from the Union, the expedition to Fort Smith was authorized under the State militia law. The battalion traveled up the Arkansas River by steamer to Fort Smith, made a display of force which achieved the desired objective, and returned to Little Rock, all in ten days, from April 20 to April 30, 1861.

=== State service ===
Arkansas seceded the next month and joined the Confederacy. The Pulaski Light Artillery immediately offered its services to the State, and new recruits rushed to join the battery. Its effective strength was doubled within a couple of weeks. Woodruff's battery was first ordered back to Fort Smith, leaving Little Rock on May 23, 1861, on the steamer "Tahlequah." The men were presented with a flag from the young ladies of Little Rock before their departure, with Miss Juliet Langtree making the presentation, and Lieutenant James W. Finley accepting on behalf of the battery. Miss Langtree closed her presentation speech with these stirring words: Take then this flag and let your determination be like that of the Spartan mother's advice when she presented her son with his shield: 'Come home with it or come home on it'. Prophetic words indeed for Lieutenant Finley, who would be dead a month later.

The Pulaski Light Artillery garrisoned the abandoned U.S. Army post at Fort Smith for several weeks, before being ordered to join the Arkansas State forces commanded by Brigadier General Nicholas Bartlett Pearce at Camp Walker, near Harmony Springs, in Benton County, Arkansas. Joining with Brigadier General Ben McCulloch's Confederate brigade, the troops marched north into Missouri and linked up with Major General Sterling Price's Missouri State Guard (roughly equivalent to the Arkansas State Troops). Proceeding to just south of Springfield, Missouri, the Pulaski Light Artillery arrived at Wilson's Creek and took part in its first pitched battle.

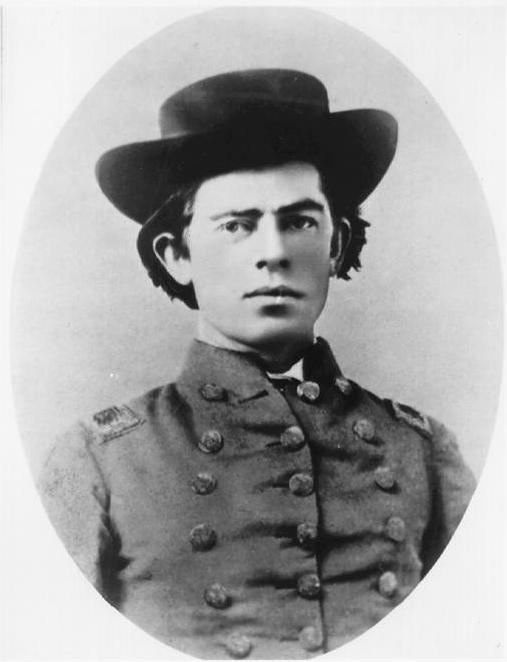
First Lieutenant Omer Rose Weaver, a member of the Pulaski Light Artillery, is recognized as the first Arkansan to die in the Civil War

From the official after-action reports for the Battle of Wilson's Creek (Oak Hills), the Pulaski Light Artillery performed like veterans, coolly and professionally. In fact, at least one regimental commander remarked that Woodruff's battery was key to the Southern victory. Captain Woodruff had had the foresight to have his battery limbered up, with horses standing in trace, at dawn on August 10. Thus, when the Union batteries opened on the Southern forces, the Pulaski Light Artillery was the first Confederate battery to be able to move into position, unlimber and open fire. Initially firing counter-battery salvoes to silence the Union guns, Woodruff's battery was then moved to a position to support an assault by Arkansas and Louisiana infantry on the Federal lines.

In this engagement, the Pulaski Light Artillery suffered two killed and one seriously wounded. During the counter-battery duel with a Union battery, First Lieutenant Omer Weaver was hit in the chest by solid shot while commanding his section of the battery, and soon died. Private Hugh Byler was hit above the knee with solid shot, which shot away his leg. Later, during the infantry support phase, Private Richard Byrd was shot in the leg by a Minié ball.

Following the battle at Wilson's Creek, the Arkansas State Troops, which had signed three-month State service enlistments, returned to Arkansas and were mustered out of service. The Pulaski Light Artillery turned their guns and equipment over to a Confederate ordnance officer and mustered out on September 2, 1861.

=== Confederate Service ===
Immediately upon their return to Little Rock, they began organizing a company for regular Confederate service. About the 1st day of November, 1861, Captain Woodruff received authority from General Albert Pike, commanding the Indian Department, the same to recruit a light battery for the Confederate service. On December 27, 1861, the "Weaver Light Artillery," named in honor of Lieutenant Omer Rose Weaver, was enlisted in Confederate service, with William E. Woodruff, Jr., as captain. The majority of the original members of the Pulaski Light Artillery remained in the artillery service. Approximately thirty enlisted in the Weaver Light Artillery and served throughout the war in either Marshall's or Blocher's batteries. A few went into cavalry or infantry units, and one, Private Allen Rufus Witt, would go on to become colonel of the 10th Arkansas Infantry Regiment. Several former members would go on to lead their own artillery batteries. John T. Trigg served as a private in the Pulaski Light Artillery before organizing Trigg's Arkansas Battery. Lieutenant Louis W. Brown would become Captain of Brown's Arkansas Battery. Lieutenant Henry Clay West would serve as commander of 4th Arkansas Field Battery and Sergeant William Durbin Blocher would eventually become Captain of the 7th Arkansas Field Battery. Corporal Anderson Mills would serve as the First Lieutenant and Acting Commander of the 9th Arkansas Field Battery Private William Pratt "Buck" Parks would serve first as a lieutenant in and later as the captain commanding Hoadley's Heavy Artillery Battery.

Lieutenant William Durbin Blocher was a sergeant in the Pulaski Light Artillery during the Battle of Wilson's Creek, later served as a Lieutenant of the Weaver Light Artillery, and became commander of Blocher's Arkansas Battery when that unit was created with a veteran cadre from the Weaver Light Artillery.

The reorganized battery was originally intended for service in the Indian Territory under General Albert Pike. General Pike had arranged for the shipment of two light batteries of six bronze guns each from Richmond for used in the Indian Territory. After taking a detachment to Devals Bluff to pick up the guns, Woodruff moved the battery west to Van Buren and was at that location when news arrived of the Confederate defeat at the Battle of Pea Ridge. The battery's caissons were utilized to transport the bodies of General McCulloh and General McIntosh from Van Buren to the government cemetery in Fort Smith for burial with full military honors. Major General Van Dorn at first considered taking Woodruff's battery with him as he moved his army first to Eastern Arkansas and then across the Mississippi River to Northern Mississippi. Captain Woodruff showed General Van Dorn a copy of the battery's orders assigning them to General Pike and General Van Dorn agreed to allow them to proceed to Indian Territory.

While at Fort Smith the unit was notified that First Lieutenant Henry Clay West had been elected as the new commander of an artillery battery organized from Desha County. Captain West met his battery at Dardnelle and brought it with him to Indian Territory. Woodruff's Battery, along with West's Battery spent the rest of the winter and spring of 1862 in Indian Territory. During this winter in Indian Territory, Brigadier General Pike directed the formation of an artillery battalion consisting of the Weaver Light Artillery, and West's Desha County Artillery and under the command of the senior Captain, Captain Woodruff. General Pike also recommended Woodruff for promotion to Major. The notice of the issuance of Captain Woodruff's commission as a major was much delayed. While dated April 17, 1862, the commission did not arrive until late in the fall of 1862, just before the Battle of Prairie Grove. The component batteries rarely, if ever, operated in combat together. They were usually assigned individually to an infantry or cavalry brigade to provide fire support, but the battalion organization provided for a method of providing logistical support and standardizing training.

When Major General Thomas C. Hindman assumed command of the Department of the Trans-Mississippi on May 31, 1862, one of his first acts was to order General Pike to return Woodruff's Battery to Arkansas. This action touched off a bitter struggle between Brigadier General Pike and Major General Hindman that ultimately resulted in Pike demanding to be relieved of command of the Indian Territory. Pike had utilized his own private funds to purchase artillery horses for Woodruff's battery.

Apparently the Battery's march to Little Rock took more time than General Hindman had anticipated because on June 29, 1862, his Adjutant, Colonel Robert C. Newton addressed the following letter to Captain Woodruff:

Captain

I sent you three days since a courier to enquire your whereabouts and let you know the importance of your hastening here. General Hindman directs me to dispatch you this, also, urging you to lose no time. - The enemy is again advancing and our force is small - really inadequate for the proper defense of this country. - We need efficient artillery above all other things. The Major General Commanding appeals to you and your men to delay not a moment, but push forward with the greatest energy.

Upon reaching Little Rock, Woodruff's battery was directed by Special Order No. 23 to join Colonel Dandridge McRae's Brigade of Brigadier General Albert Rust's 1st Division of the newly formed Army of the South West. McRea's Brigade was immediately sent east, along with the Texas Cavalry Command of Col. W.H. Parsons to counter a thrust toward Little Rock by Union General Curtis. McRea's Brigade and Woodruff's Battery were present but not engaged during the July 7, 1862 Battle of Cotton Plant, Arkansas. Curtis eventually broke off his advance on Little Rock and moved instead to occupy Helena on the Mississippi River.

Later that summer, Woodruff's Battery provided a cadre of veterans under Lieutenant Blocher to form yet another battery. General Hindman was scrambling to organize new Confederate forces in the wake of the departure of almost all organized forces when General Van Dorn moved his Army of the West across the Mississippi in April 1862. When Woodruff's Battery returned to Little Rock, General Hindman learned that the battery had not been reorganized as required by the Confederate Conscription Act of April 1862. To correct this, General Hindman ordered that the battery re-organize and a new election of officers occur. In this election conducted on July 19, 1862, First Lieutenant William Durbin Blocher and First Lieutenant James Cook were not re-elected. General Hindman immediate ordered that these officers remain in the artillery service and directed them to organize a new battery. To facilitate the creation of this new battery, General Hindman arranged for the transfer of an experienced cadre of cannoneers from Woodruff's battery to Blocher's new battery. Blocher's Battery was organized at Little Rock, Arkansas, on August 6, 1862. The new battery, which was augmented by unassigned recruits and transfers from other regiments. The battery officers were Captain William D. Blocher, First Lieutenant James Cook, Second Lieutenant Jesse V. Zimmerman, and Third Lieutenant Edward Visart, all of whom were assigned from the Weaver Light Artillery.

McRae's Brigade, with Woodruff's Battery was next ordered to report to Brigadier General James S. Rains at Elkhorn (Pea Ridge), but later this command was changed and McRae was ordered to report, with Woodruff's Battery to Des Arc, Arkansas.

McRae's Brigade, with Woodruff's Battery was eventually ordered to join Brigadier General Francis A. Shoup's 1st Division of Major General Thomas C. Hindman's 1st Corps, Army of the Trans-Mississippi at Massard's Prairie, just outside Fort Smith. On the march west, Woodruff's commission as a Major of Artillery finally caught up with him and the command of the Weavery light Artillery fell to Lieutenant John G. Marshall. Woodruff was appointed a Chief of Artillery, Shoup's Division. The battery, now referred to in reports as Marshall's battery participated in the Battle of Prairie Grove, on December 7, 1862. The unit was not heavily engaged at Prairie Grove and spend post of the day in reserve behind McRae's brigade.

Following the retreat of Hindman's forces from northwest Arkansas, the battery spent the spring and early summer of 1863 in an artillery camp with the other batteries of Major W. E. Woodruff's artillery battalion near St. John's College in Little Rock. Woodruff was assigned as the Chief of Artillery to Major General D. M. Frost's Division. Woodruff's Artillery Battalion at this time was composed of Etter's Battery, Marshall's Battery, and Blocher's Arkansas Batteries, Tildent and Ruffner's Missouri Batteries, and Edgar's Texas Battery. This spring encampment was the only time during the war that Woodruff's Battalion was able to actually practice the artillery drill as a battalion, since the units usually fought as independent batteries or even sections.

In preparation for the Confederate attack on Union positions at Helena, Arkansas, on July 4, 1863, Marshall's Battery was assigned to Brigadier General Dandridge McRae's 1st Brigade of Major General Sterling Price's Division of Lieutenant General Theophilus H. Holmes's District of Arkansas, in Lieutenant General Edmund Kirby Smith's Trans-Mississippi Department.

The battery was later engaged the Little Rock Campaign and the Red River Campaign, March through May 1864.

The battery is next mentioned in a report from Brigadier General Churchill detailing the forces under his command on September 1, 1864:

Headquarters Churchill's Division.

Princeton, September 1, 1864.

Captain BUCK, Assistant Adjutant-General, District of Arkansas:

CAPTAIN: In compliance with circular letter of instructions, Numbers 686, from district headquarters, date August 31, 1864, I have the honor to report the following as the number of regiments, battalions, batteries and independent companies under my command at this place ...

Third. Blocher's artillery battalion, Major Blocher commanding- first, Captain Etter's Arkansas Light battery, Captain Etter commanding; second, Marshall's Arkansas light battery, Captain Marshall commanding.

On September 11, 1864, Brigadier General Churchill issued Special Order Number 72 from Camp Yell which mentioned Marshall's Battery:

(Paragraph) III. Major Blocher will move to-morrow morning with Captains Marshall's and Etter's batteries, leaving Captain Trigg's battery in its present encampment until further orders.

In General E. Kirby Smith's September 30, 1864, report on the Organization of the Army of the Trans-Mississippi Department, Marshall's Battery is listed as belonging to the 5th Mounted Artillery Battalion along with West's and McNalley's Arkansas Batteries. On November 19, 1864, General E. Kirby Smith, commanding the Confederate Trans-Mississippi Department, issued Special Orders No. 290, re-organizing the artillery of the department and for the first time providing numerical designations to the batteries and battalions. In this reorganization, the Weaver Light Artillery, armed with 4 guns, and commanded by Capt. John G. Marshall was redesignated as the 3rd Arkansas Field Battery and assigned to the 5th Artillery Battalion, commanded by Maj. William Durbin Blocher (Weaver Light Artillery), 4 guns (mounted).

On December 31, 1864, General E. Kirby Smith listed the battery as belonging to Blocher's Artillery Battalion of Acting Major General Churchill's First Infantry Division of Major General John B. Magruder's Second Army Corps, Army of the Trans-Mississippi.

== Surrender ==
William E. Woodruff, Jr, in his book With the Light Guns in '61-65', reports that Zimmerman's 7th Arkansas Field Battery and Marshall's 3rd Arkansas Field Battery were consolidated, under the command of Captain Zimmerman, before the end of the war and the consolidated organization was in camp near Marshall, Texas, when the war ended. This battery surrendered by General E. Kirby Smith with the Trans-Mississippi Department on May 26, 1865. The date of the military convention between Confederate General Edmund Kirby Smith and Union General Edward Canby for the surrender of the troops and public property in the Trans-Mississippi Department was May 26, 1865; however, it took a while for parole commissioners to be appointed and for public property to be accounted for. As a result, a final report of field artillery which was part of the accounting process, was not completed until June 1, 1865. The final report lists both Marshall's and Zimmerman's batteries as separate units, with Zimmerman's four guns located near Collinsburg, Louisiana, and Marshall's at Marshall, Texas, with no guns.

== See also ==
- List of Confederate units from Arkansas
- Confederate Units by State
