= 7th Arkansas Field Battery =

- Active: 1862–1865
- Country: Confederate States of America
- Allegiance: CSA
- Branch: Artillery
- Engagements: American Civil War Battle of Prairie Grove Battle of Helena Little Rock Campaign Battle of Bayou Fourche Camden Expedition Battle of Elkin's Ferry Battle of Prairie D'Ane Battle of Marks' Mills Price's Missouri Raid Battle of Fort Davidson, Fourth Battle of Boonville, Second Battle of Lexington, Battle of Little Blue River, Second Battle of Independence, Battle of Byram's Ford, Battle of Westport, Battle of Marais des Cygnes, Battle of Mine Creek, Battle of Marmiton River, Second Battle of Newtonia,

Commanders
- 1862-1864: Captain William D. Blocher
- 1864-1865: Captain Jesse V. Zimmerman

The 7th Arkansas Field Battery, originally known as the Blocher's Battery (1862–1865), was a Confederate artillery battery that served during the American Civil War. The unit was also known as Blocher's Battery or Zimmerman's Battery. The battery spent its entire existence in the Department of the Trans-Mississippi.

== Organization ==
Blocher's Battery was created in the summer of 1862 during Major General Thomas C. Hindman's effort to rebuild Confederate forces in Arkansas. When Major General Earl Van Dorn transferred his Army of the West from Arkansas to Northern Mississippi in April 1862, he stripped the state of its military stores and almost every organized military unit, including all of the artillery. The only organized batteries were actually in the Indian Territory (modern Oklahoma) supporting Brigadier General Albert Pike's forces. One of Hindman's first acts in command was to order Woodruff's Battery, also known as the Weaver Light Artillery, to return to Little Rock from the Indian Territory. When the battery reached Little Rock, General Hindman learned that Woodruff's Battery had not been reorganized as required by the Confederate Conscription Act of April 1862. To correct this, General Hindman ordered that the battery re-organize and a new election of officers occur. In this election, First Lieutenant William Durbin Blocher and First Lieutenant James Cook were not re-elected. Hindman immediate ordered that these officers remain in the artillery service and directed them to organize a new battery. To facilitate the creation of this new battery, General Hindman arranged for the transfer of an experienced cadre of cannoneers from Woodruff's battery to Blocher's new battery.

Blocher's Battery was organized at Little Rock, Arkansas, on August 6, 1862. An experienced cadre of veterans from the Weaver Light Artillery (Woodruff's Battery) was assigned to the new battery, which was augmented by unassigned recruits and transfers from other regiments. The battery officers were Captain William Durbin Blocher, First Lieutenant James Cook, Second Lieutenant Jesse V. Zimmerman, and Third Lieutenant Edward Visart, all of whom were assigned from the Weaver Light Artillery.

== Service ==
Lieutenant William Durbin Blocher was a sergeant in the Pulaski Light Artillery during the Battle of Wilson's Creek, later served as a Lieutenant of the Weaver Light Artillery, and became commander of Blocher's Arkansas Battery

Blocher's Battery served in the Trans-Mississippi Department throughout the war, and campaigned in Arkansas, Louisiana, Missouri and the Indian Territory. In December 1862 the battery was assigned to Brigadier General James F. Fagans' brigade of Brigadier General James F. Fagan's division of Major General Thomas C. Hindman's 1st Corps, Army the Trans-Mississippi for the Prairie Grove campaign. During the Battle of Prairie Grove the battery's guns were captured by the 20th Wisconsin Infantry. The unit's position changed hands repeatedly during the battle. The following is Captain Blocher's report of the Battle of Prairie Grove:

I received orders from Brigadier General [James Fleming] Fagan about 11 o'clock to go immediately into battery on the Fayetteville and Cane Hill Road on the crest of the hill, and remained about half an hour, when I received orders to limber up and advance about 150 yards down the road, and take a position at a house about 200 yards from the right of it, on the side of the hill.

Skirmishers here reported to me from Colonels [Joseph C.] Pleasants', [James P.] King's and [Alexander Travis] Hawthorn's Regiments, which I ordered to my front right and left at least 200 yards in advance of my battery. I remained for nearly an hour when the enemy advanced a battery up the road and into a field on their right and opened fire upon my battery, which I returned and drove them from the field. I then ceased firing for about an hour.

During this time the enemy had brought two batteries in the field under cover of a column of infantry. The infantry having started from the field, I was ordered to commence firing. I directed my fire upon the column of infantry and continued until they retired from the field. I then turned it upon the battery nearest the road. In the meantime, one of my guns having been rendered unserviceable by a primer being fastened in the vent, I ordered it off the field to be repaired.

During this time the enemy had placed three more batteries on the field and were directing a heavy fire upon my battery, doing but little damage. After firing about twenty minutes, I received orders from Brigadier General [Francis Asbury] Shoup to cease. The batteries continued to throw spherical case, canister, and solid shot, also large projectiles from an English rifle battery upon the position occupied by me.

At this time the line of battle was advancing across the field, evidently for the purpose of charging my battery, when I sent a messenger to Brigadier General Fagan to know whether I should remain where I was or retire further up the hill. This messenger met you, and you ordered him to return immediately and order me to fire canister shot, when their advanced line, which was under cover of the hill and unseen by me until within twenty yards of my battery, opened fire, and advanced in solid mass in a run upon my battery, killing and wounding a large number of horses and men. I attempted to limber to the right, with the intention of moving to the rear by the road on my right, but was unable to do so, owing to the enemy pressing me so closely and killing so many horses.

I then ordered my men to fall back to the infantry and leave the guns. They fell back to the rear of Colonel Hawthorn's Regiment, at least 250 yards to my rear and on my left, which was lying down until the enemy advanced and fired upon them. When the regiment had driven the enemy back from my guns, I took two pieces from the ground and could not get horses enough to take any more carriages away at that time. After the firing had ceased for the day, I got horses from Captain [Westley] Roberts' Battery and rescued my last piece and caisson. Two of my caissons I could not find, supposed to have been carried to the rear by our own men.

My loss during the engagement was two men killed, eleven wounded, and eleven missing (most of them supposed to be killed or wounded) and forty horses killed.

My thanks are due Captain [John G.] Marshall for lending me his forge, limber and horses to a disabled caisson from the field; to Lieutenants [James] Cook, [J.V.] Zimmerman, and [Edward] Visart, and particularly to my men for their coolness and bravery during the entire engagement - not one of them left their posts until the order was given. My thanks are also due Lieutenant J. Wesley Halliburton (First Arkansas Cavalry), who reported to me for duty before the engagement and rendered me valuable services.

In the re-organization of the Army of the Trans-Mississippi following the Prairie Grove Campaign, in January, 1863, the battery was assigned to support Fagan's Brigade in Hindman's Division.

Following the retreat of Hindman's forces from northwest Arkansas, the battery spent the spring and early summer of 1863 in an artillery camp with the other batteries of Major W. E. Woodruff's artillery battalion near St. John's College in Little Rock. Woodruff was assigned as the Chief of Artillery to Major General D. M. Frost's Division. Woodruff's Artillery Battalion at this time was composed of Etter's Battery, Marshall's Battery, and Blocher's Arkansas Batteries, Tildent and Ruffner's Missouri Batteries, and Edgar's Texas Battery. This spring encampment was the only time during the war that Woodruff's Battalion was able to actually practice the artillery drill as a battalion, since the units usually fought as independent batteries or even sections.

The battery fought with Brigadier General Fagan's brigade at the Battle of Helena on July 4, 1863. Launching the attack on Hindman Hill (Battery D) at first light, Fagan's men suffered heavily under enfilading fire from Graveyard Hill (Battery C) to Fagan's left. Fagan's men carried lines of rifle pits but could not capture Hindman Hill. Blocher's battery was impeded by trees that Union soldier had felled along the roads and all approaches to the Federal positions and did not report any casualties from the battle. During the Little Rock Campaign the battery, while still assigned to Fagan's Brigade, participated in the Battle of Bayou Fourche on September 10, 1863. During the Battle of Bayou Fourche, Fagan's Brigade with Blocher's Battery moved to reinforce Brigadier General Marmaduke's Cavalry Division in opposing union forces which had forced a crossing of the Arkansas River, east of Little Rock. Blocher's Battery occupied a position in from a temporary battery which had been assembled by William E. Woodruff, Jr. Woodruff's referred to the temporary organization as his "Bull Battery" because the guns were pulled by oxen. Blocher was apparently warned by Woodruff, "my bulls are not good at maneuvering, they were too new, and when the ball opened, I should fire straight ahead if the aim should happen to lie that way, and that he (Blocher) must look "a little out".

In April, 1864, the battery was assigned to support the Brigadier General William Lewis Cabell's cavalry brigade of General Fagan's Cavalry Division. The unit participated in the Camden Expedition in the spring of 1864. Lieutenant Zimmerman led one section of Blocher's Battery to support Brigadier General Marmaduke's Cavalry Division. Zimmerman's section of Blocher's Battery participated in the Battle of Elkin's Ferry on April 3, 1864. The battery was involved in the fighting at the Battle of Prairie D'Ane on April 10, 1864, and the Battle of Marks' Mills on April 25, 1864.

The battery, under the command of Lieutenant J. V. Zimmerman, participated with Dobbins' brigade in Price's Missouri Raid in September and October 1864: The battery is mentioned in Union Army Reports of the Battle of Fort Davidson, also known as the Battle of Pilot Knob, on September 27, 1864:

Fagan's division had four brigades, under Generals Cabell and McCray and Colonels Dobbin and Slemons. Cabell's brigade had the following regiments: Morgan's, 500; Monroe's, 500; Hill's, 500; Gordon's, 500; Gunter's battalion, 200; HarrelFs battalion, 200; Witherspoous battalion, 200; Hughey's battery, five 6-pounders and one 12pounder howitzer. In MeCray's brigade were the following regiments: Coleman's, Crandall's, Reves', Baber's, and Anderson's battalion; no battery. In Slemons' were the following regiments: Crawford's, Wright's, and Second Arkansas, and Gentry's battery, two guns. In Dobbin's brigade were McGhee's battalion and Zimmerman's battery, two guns, one 6 and one 12-pounder ... . It was Cabell's brigade, Fagan's division, and Clark's brigade, of Marmaduke's division, with Hughey's and Pratt's batteries, that did most of the lighting here.

The battery was present for or engaged in the following actions during Price's Missouri Raid, Arkansas-Missouri-Kansas, September–October, 1864:

Battle of Fort Davidson, Missouri, September 27, 1864
Fourth Battle of Boonville, Missouri, October 11, 1864
Second Battle of Lexington, Missouri, October 19, 1864
Battle of Little Blue River, Missouri, October 21, 1864
Second Battle of Independence, Missouri, October 21–22, 1864
Battle of Byram's Ford, Missouri, October 22–23, 1864
Battle of Westport, Missouri, October 23, 1864
Battle of Marais des Cygnes, Linn County, Kansas, October 25, 1864
Battle of Mine Creek, Missouri, October 25, 1864
Battle of Marmiton River, Missouri, October 25, 1864
Second Battle of Newtonia, Missouri, October 28, 1864

In November 1864, the battery was redesignated as the Seventh Arkansas Field Battery, and was assigned to the Fifth Artillery Battalion. Captain Blocher, who had been promoted to major, commanded the battalion, and Lieutenant Zimmerman succeeded him in command of the battery. Other component batteries in the Fifth Artillery Battalion were the First Arkansas Field Battery (McNally), Third Arkansas Field Battery (Marshall), Fourth Arkansas Field Battery (West), First Missouri Field Battery (Ruffner), and Third Missouri Field Battery (Lesueur).

On December 31, 1864, General E. Kirby Smith listed the battery as belonging to Blocher's Artillery Battalion of Acting Major General Churchill's First Infantry Division of Major General John B. Magruder's Second Army Corps, Army of the Trans-Mississippi.

== Surrender ==
William E. Woodruff, Jr, in his book, "With the Light Guns in '61-65' reports that Zimmerman's 7th Arkansas Field Battery and Marshall's 3rd Arkansas Field Battery were consolidated, under the command of Captain Zimmerman, before the end of the war and he indicates that the consolidated organization was in camp near Marshall, Texas, when the war ended. Blocher's (now Zimmerman's) Battery surrendered with the Trans-Mississippi Army on May 26, 1865. The date of the military convention between Confederate General Edmund Kirby Smith and Union General Edward Canby for the surrender of the troops and public property in the Trans-Mississippi Department was May 26, 1865, however, it took a while for parole commissioners to be appointed and for public property to be accounted for. As a result, a final report of field artillery which was part of the accounting process, was not completed until June 1, 1865. The final report lists both Marshall's and Zimmerman's batteries as separate units, with Zimmerman's four guns located near Collinsburg, Louisiana and Marshall's at Marshall, Texas, with no guns.

== See also ==
- List of Confederate units from Arkansas
- Confederate Units by State
