= French weapons in the American Civil War =

French weapons in the American Civil War had a key role in the conflict and encompassed most of the sectors of weaponry of the American Civil War (1861–1865), from artillery to firearms, submarines and ironclad warships. The effect of French weapons was especially significant in field artillery and infantry. These weapons were either American productions based on French designs, or sometimes directly imported from France.

== Field artillery ==
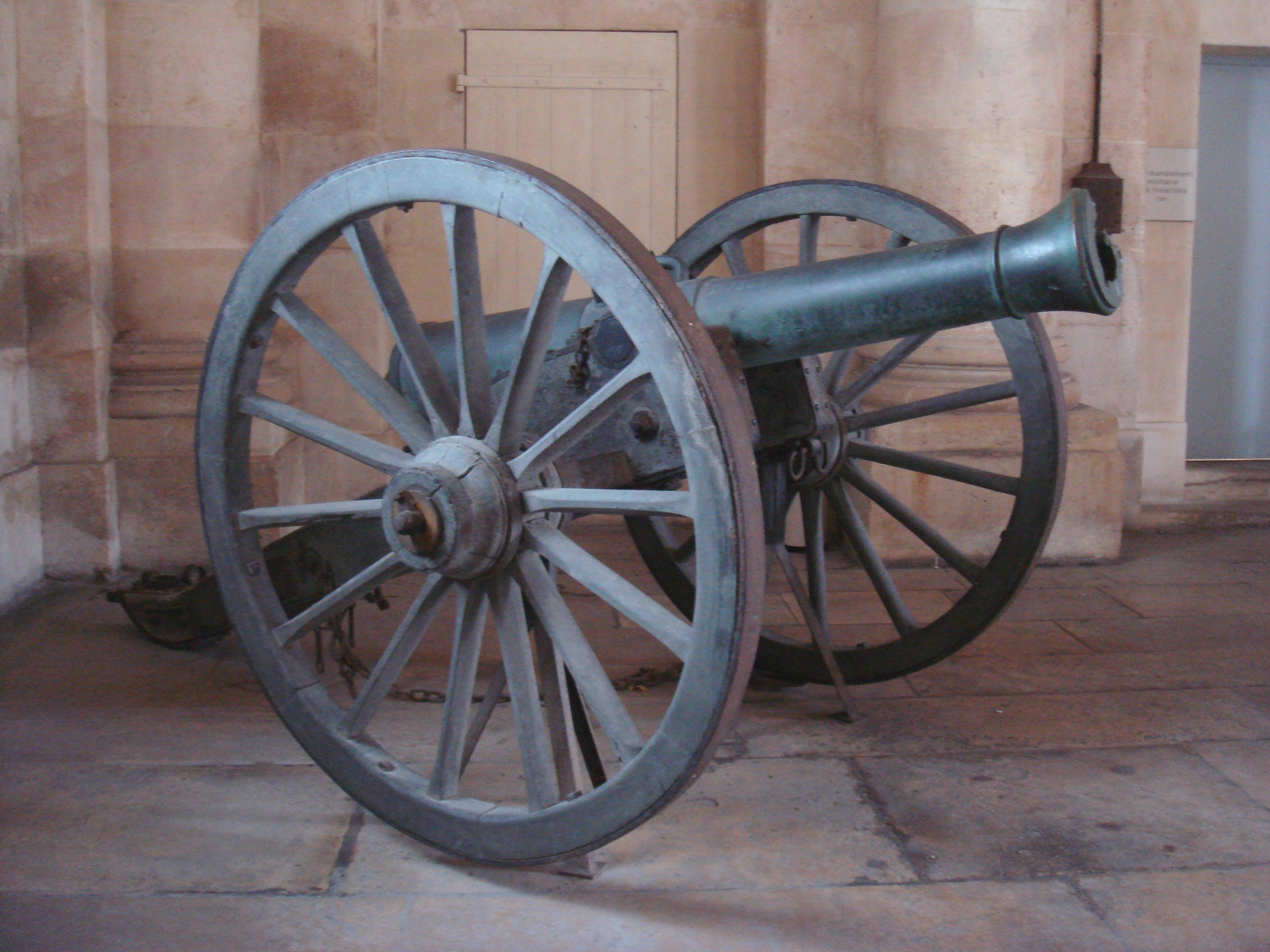
The French "Canon obusier de campagne de 12 modèle 1853", on display in Les Invalides

The canon obusier de 12, introduced in the French Army in 1853, an early type of canon obusier, or gun howitzer developed during the reign of Napoleon III, was the primary cannon used in the American Civil War, under the name of 12-pounder Napoleon Model 1857. Over 1,100 such Napoleons were manufactured by the North, and 600 by the South.

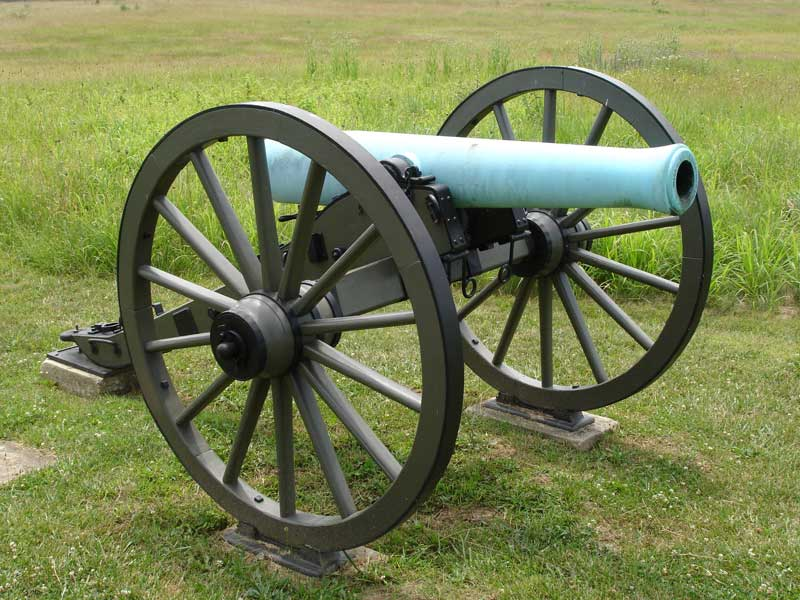
An American M1857 12-Pounder "Napoleon"

The twelve-pound cannon "Napoleon" was the most popular smoothbore cannon used during the war. It was widely admired because of its safety, reliability, and killing power, especially at close range. It did not reach America until 1857. It was the last cast bronze gun used by an American army. The Federal version of the Napoleon can be recognized by the flared front end of the barrel, called the muzzle swell. Confederate Napoleons were produced in at least six variations, most of which had straight muzzles, but at least eight cataloged survivors of 133 identified have muzzle swells. Additionally, four iron Confederate Napoleons produced by Tredegar Iron Works in Richmond, Virginia have been identified, of an estimated 125 cast.

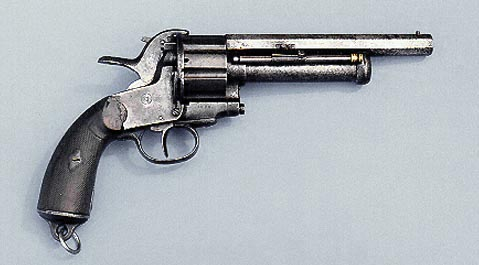
The LeMat revolver, designed by Jean Alexandre LeMat of New Orleans and manufactured in France and Belgium.

== Submarines ==
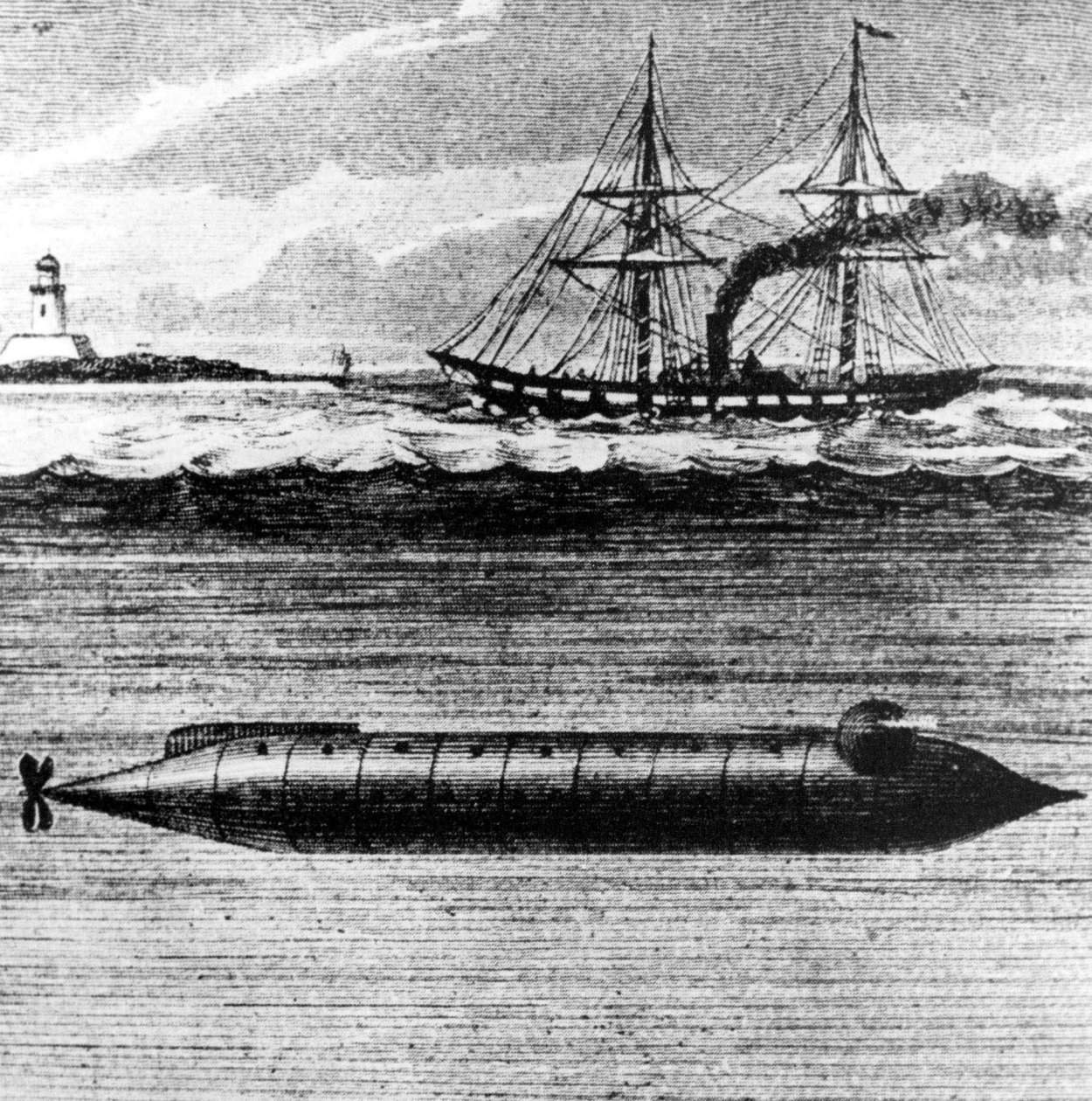
The 1862 Alligator, first submarine of the US Navy, was developed in conjunction with the French.

During the American Civil War, the Union-built and French-designed submarine Alligator was the first U.S. Navy submarine and the first to feature compressed air (for air supply) and an air filtration system. Initially hand-powered by oars, it was converted after 6 months to a screw propeller powered by a hand crank. With a crew of 20, it was larger than Confederate submarines. Alligator was 47 feet (14.3 m) long and about 4 feet (1.2 m) in diameter. The submarine was lost in a storm off Cape Hatteras on April 1, 1863 with no crew and under tow to its first combat deployment at Charleston.

== Ironclads ==
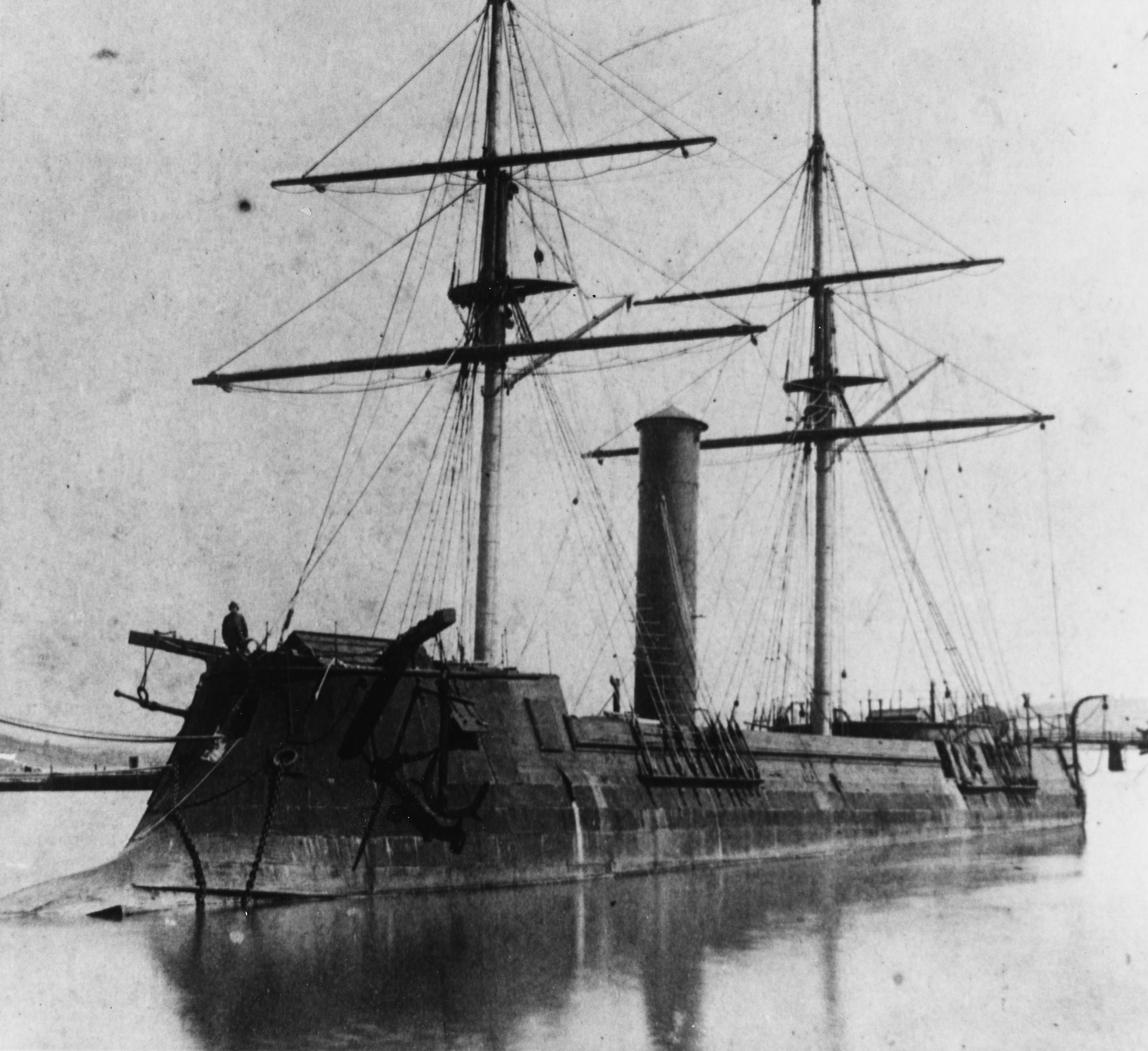
The Confederacy's last ironclad was also Japan's first: Stonewall was later renamed Kōtetsu.

As the Confederacy struggled against the North, it attempted to purchase one of the latest ironclads from France, Stonewall (later acquired by Japan after the end of the war). The ship, built in Bordeaux, France by the L'Arman shipyard in 1864, was an ironclad ram warship. However, the French government embargoed the sale of the ship to the Confederacy in February 1864 (prior to her launch in June 1864), and then sold the ship to the Royal Danish Navy as Stærkodder. However, L'Arman and the Danish Navy could not agree on a price for the ship, and sometime shortly after January 7, 1865 the vessel took on a Confederate crew and was commissioned CSS Stonewall while still at sea; L'Arman had secretly resold her to the Confederacy.

The arrival of the "formidable" Stonewall in America was dreaded by the Union, and several ships tried to intercept her, among them USS Kearsarge and USS Sacramento. In February and March, USS Niagara and USS Sacramento laid up at Ferrol, Spain, to prevent Stonewall from departing, but the much more powerful Confederate ship was able to make good her escape.

After an eventful crossing of the Atlantic Ocean, she eventually arrived in North American waters near the end of the American Civil War, too late to have a significant effect. (By the time of her October 1864 commissioning the Confederacy was in disarray and near defeat, its navy disintegrating, along with most other Confederate institutions.) To avoid surrendering the vessel, Captain Page sailed her into Havana harbor and turned her over to the Captain General of Cuba for the sum of $16,000.

The vessel was then turned over to United States authorities in return for reimbursement of the same amount. She was temporarily de-commissioned, stationed at a US Navy dock, until she was offered for sale to the Japanese government of the Tokugawa shogunate.
