= Canon obusier de 12 =

French field gun of 1853

"Canon de l’Empereur" Canon obusier de campagne de 12 12-pounder "Napoleon"
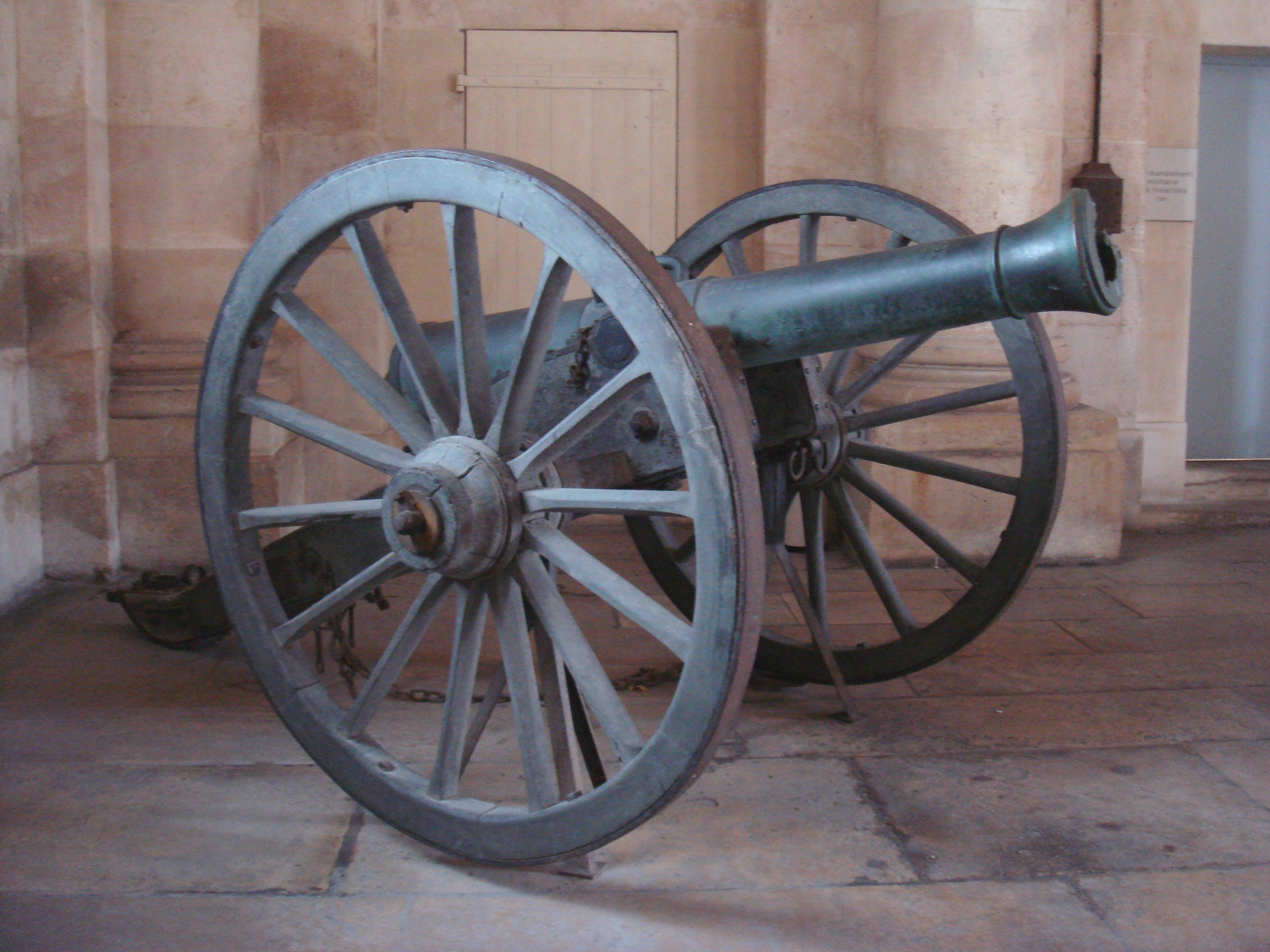
- Canon obusier de campagne de 12 modèle 1853 on display in Les Invalides.
- Type: Regimental artillery field gun
- Place of origin: France

Service history
- Used by: France, United States, Confederate States of America
- Wars: Crimean War, American Civil War

Production history
- Designed: 1853
- No. built: France: ? United States: Union States: 1,100, Confederate states: 600

Specifications
- Mass: 626 kg (1,227 lb), with carriage: 1,200 kg (2,353 lb)
- Length: 1.91 m (66 in)
- Crew: 4
- Shell: 4.1 kg shell, ball, canister
- Caliber: 121 mm (4.62 in)
- Muzzle velocity: 439 m/s (1,440 ft/s)
- Effective firing range: 1,480 m at 5° elevation (1,440 yd)

The Canon obusier de 12 (officially the "Canon obusier de campagne de 12 livres, modèle 1853"), also known as the "Canon de l’Empereur" ("cannon of the emperor"), was a type of canon-obusier (literally "shell-gun cannon", "gun-howitzer") developed by France in 1853. Its performance and versatility (it was able to fire either ball, shell, canister or grapeshot) allowed it to replace all the previous field guns, especially the Canon de 8 and the Canon de 12 as well as the two howitzers of the Valée system.

The cannon was known in the United States as the 12-pounder Napoleon after French President and Emperor Napoleon III.

== Characteristics ==
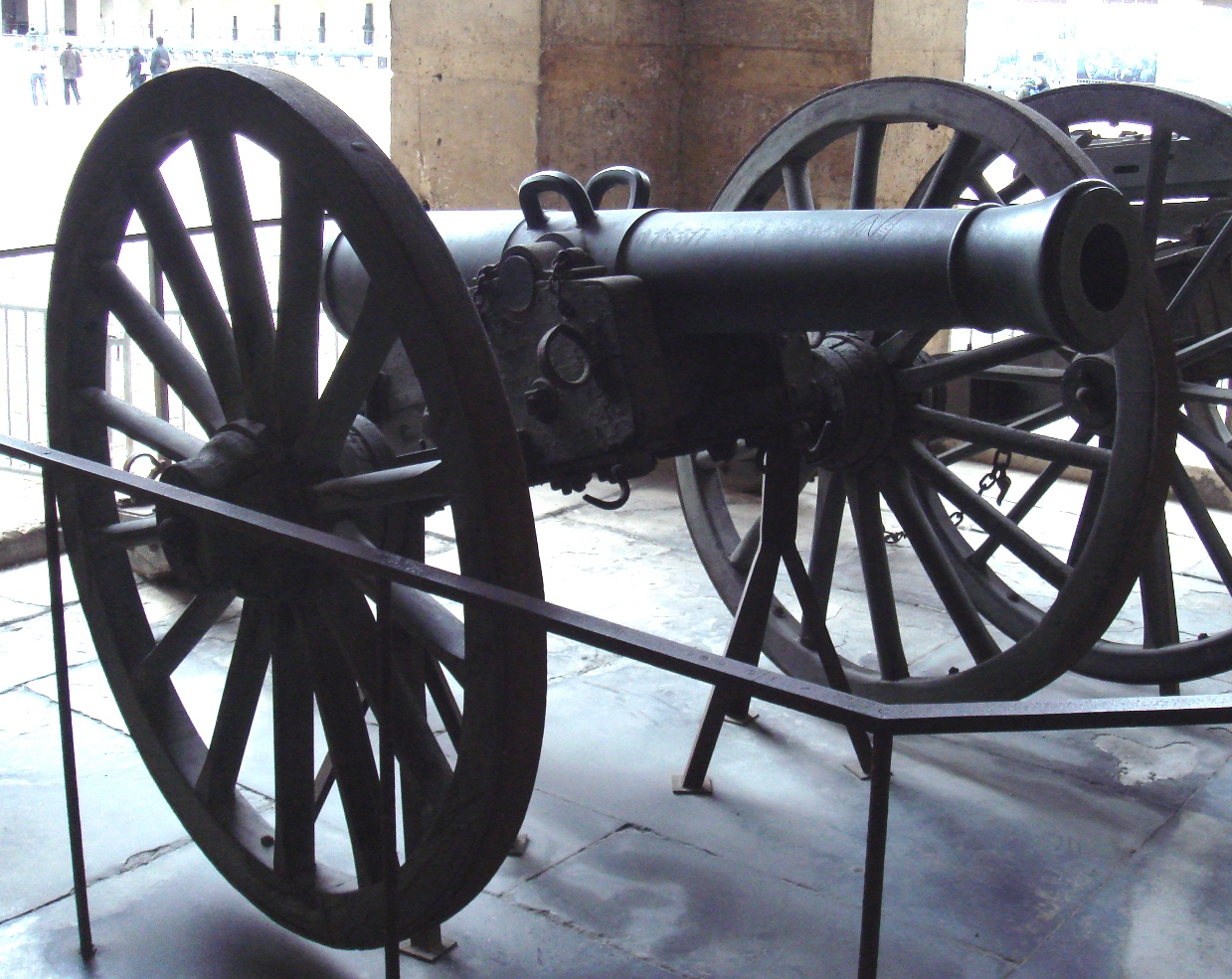
Canon-obusier Le Lassaigne, modèle 1853.

The "canon obusier" was a smoothbore cannon firing either shells, balls, or canister. This was an improvement over previous cannon firing only balls, such as those of the Gribeauval system. The "canon obusier de 12 livres" is commonly described as a "12-pounder" in English, although the nominal rating was based on a slightly different measure - the bore is the size of a solid cast-iron ball weighing 12 livres (old French pounds, about 1.079 English pounds.) As with other cannon rated by nominal weight, the projectile actually used might be of a different weight. The new weapon "revolutionized field artillery. The Napoleon was light enough to be moved rapidly on the battlefield by horses, heavy enough to destroy field fortifications almost a mile away, and versatile enough to fire solid shot, shell, spherical case, and canister." The French Army introduced the "canon obusier de 12" in 1853.

== American career ==
This type of "canon obusier", commonly called in English the 12-pounder Napoleon Model 1857, was the primary cannon used in the American Civil War. Over 1,100 such Napoleons were manufactured by the North, and 600 by the South. At Gettysburg, 142 out of 360 Union guns (39%) were Napoleons.

The "12-pounder Napoleon" was widely admired because of its safety, reliability, and killing power, especially at close range. It was the last cast bronze gun used by an American army. The Union version of the Napoleon can be recognized by the flared front end of the barrel, called the muzzle swell. Confederate Napoleons were produced in at least six variations, most of which had straight muzzles, but at least eight cataloged survivors of 133 identified have muzzle swells.

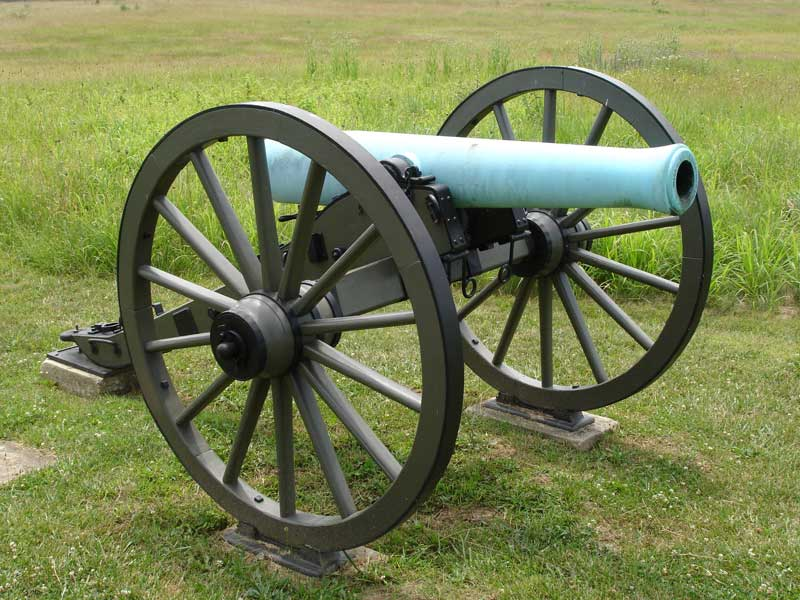
M1857 12-Pounder "Napoleon"

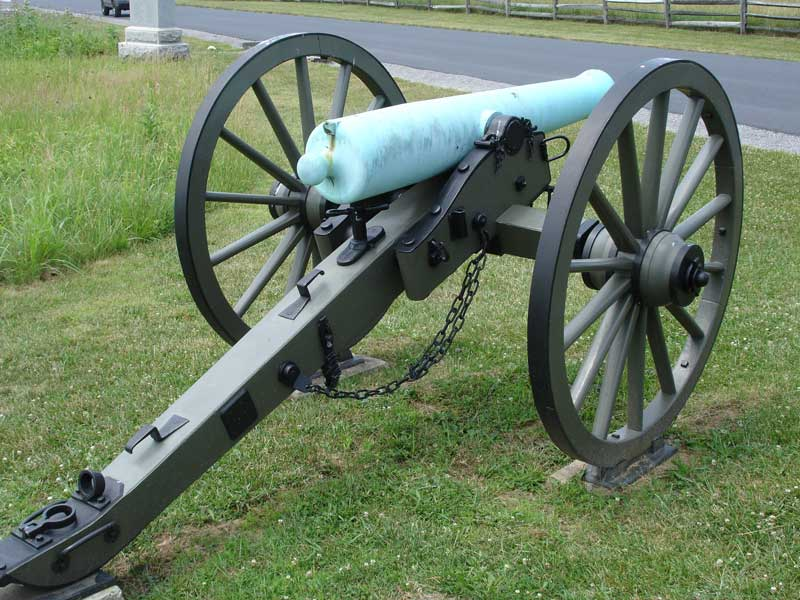
M1857 12-Pounder "Napoleon"

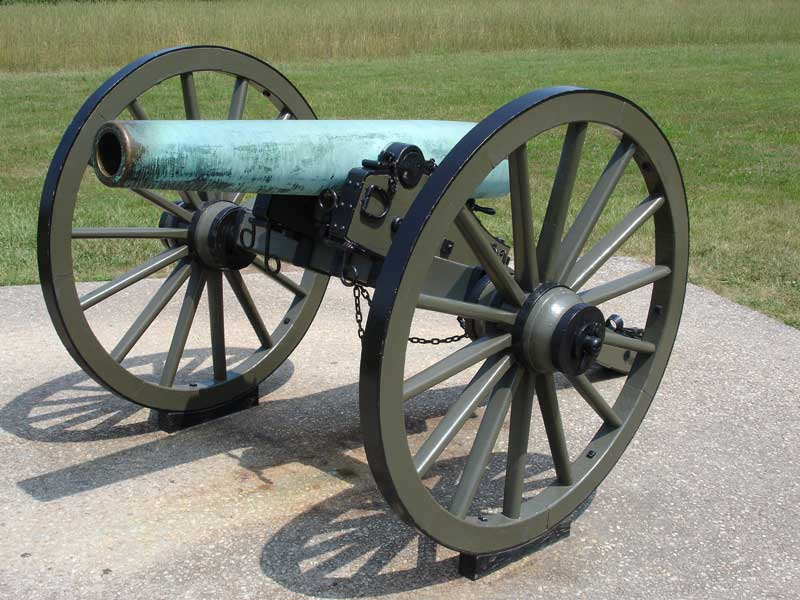
Confederate 12-Pounder "Napoleon"

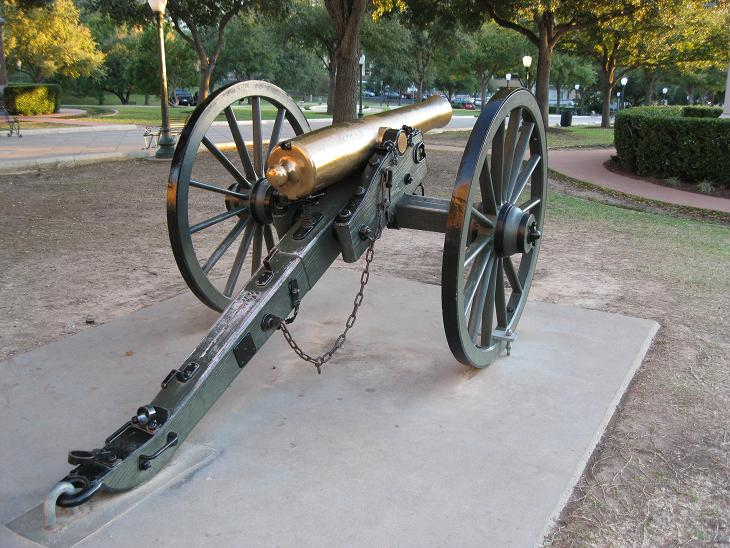
12-pounder "Napoleon" USA-made in 1864

== Succession ==
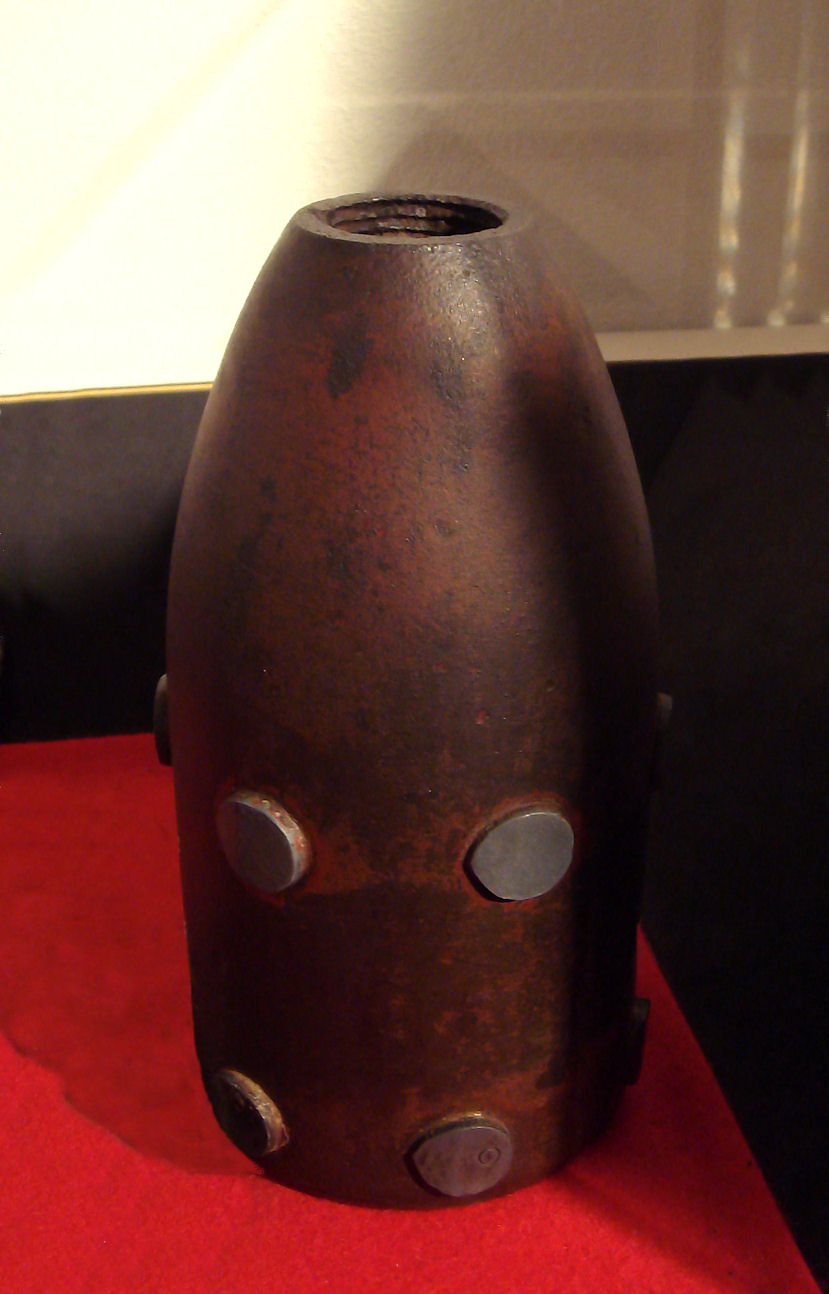
From 1858, Napoleon III had his existing canon-obusiers rifled in order to accommodate the new La Hitte system for muzzle-loading rifled guns. Here, such a shell used in Japan in the 1860s and the Boshin war, where it was called a "Napoleon shell". Ryozen Museum of History, Kyoto, Japan.

The smoothbore "canon obusier" was soon superseded by rifled cannons, which had much more accuracy and range, with the developments of Antoine Treuille de Beaulieu and the introduction of the La Hitte system in 1858.

Napoleon III had his existing guns, such as the Canon obusier de 12, rifled to accommodate the La Hitte system. Such guns remained in use until 1870.

== See also ==
Media related to Canon obusier de 12 at Wikimedia Commons

- French weapons in the American Civil War
- Field artillery in the American Civil War
- Licorne
- Twelve-pound cannon
