= Twelve-pound cannon =

Cannon type of the 18th and 19th centuries

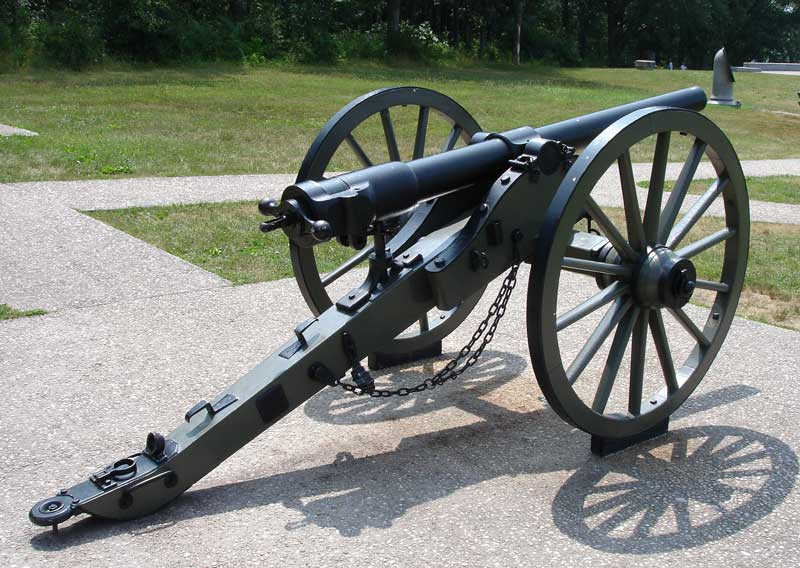
12-pounder Whitworth rifled cannon

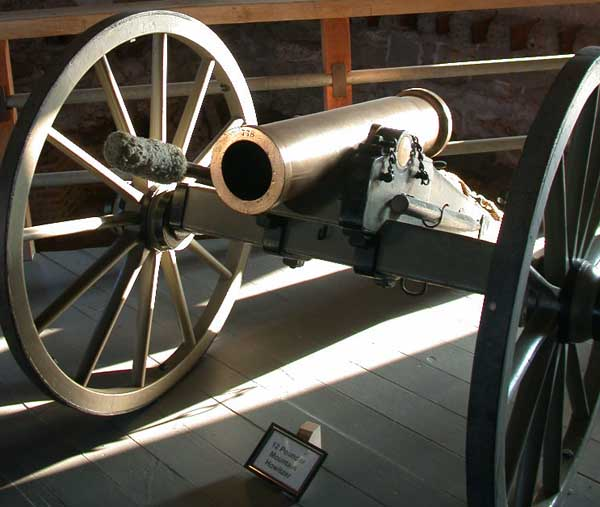
M1841 howitzer

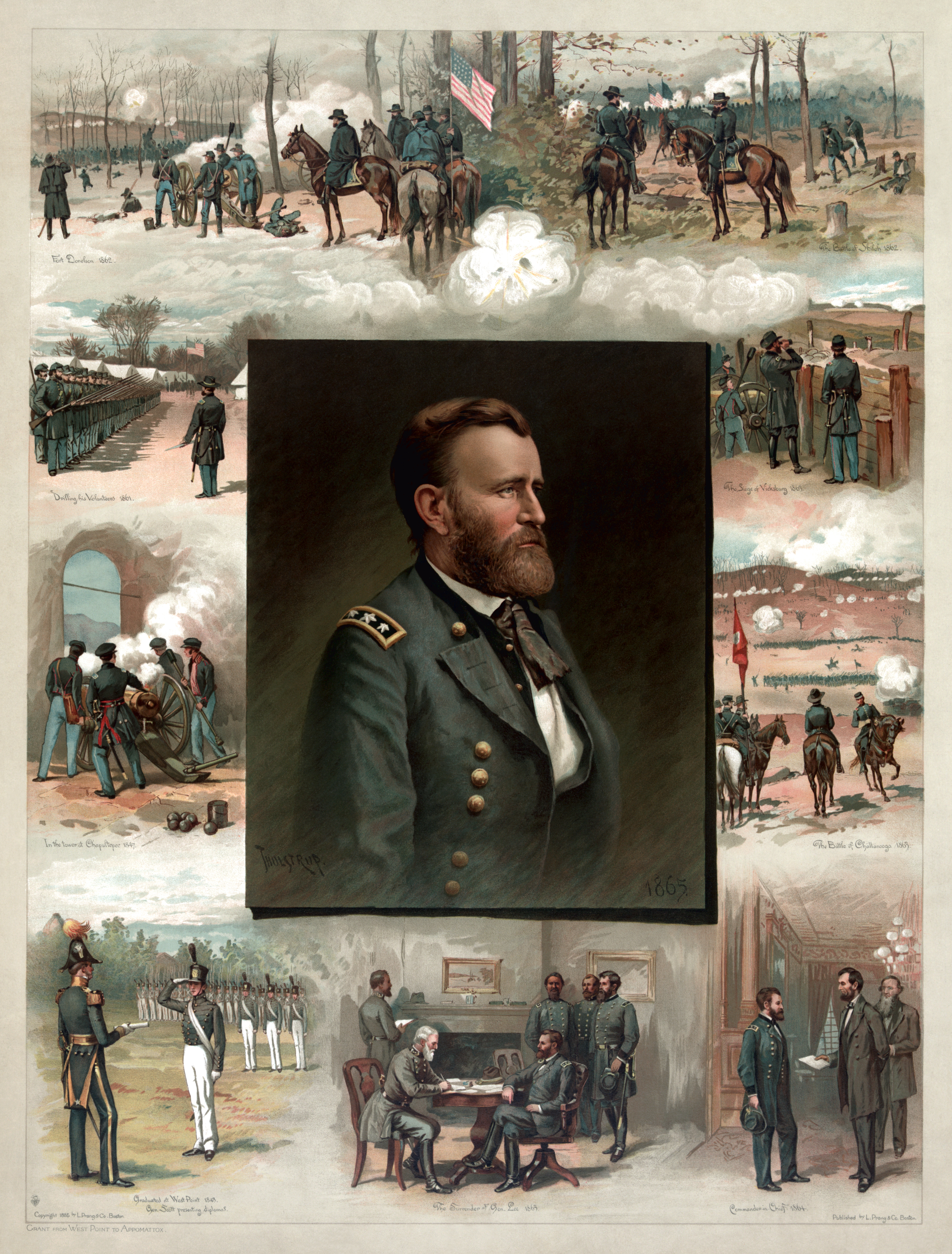
In the left of this picture U.S. Grant can be seen firing a mountain howitzer

The twelve-pound cannon is a cannon that fires twelve-pound projectiles from its barrel, as well as grapeshot, chain shot, shrapnel, and later shells and canister shot. It was first used during the Tudor period and was commonly used during the Napoleonic Wars, 1799–1815. At this time 12-pounders were the largest caliber of long-barreled field pieces, and were used both at long range against fortifications and troop concentrations using round shot and against attacking infantry and cavalry using canister shot. As such the 12-pounder was a favorite weapon of the Grande Armée. Later, redesigned 12-pounders were named after Napoleon III and found heavy use during the American Civil War.

Twelve-pounders were also carried on naval vessels of various sizes. Unlike their land-based cousins, such weapons were considered light by naval standards. They formed the main armament of smaller frigates, and were used on the upper decks of larger vessels, where their relatively lighter weight would not be a problem. They were commonly found on the quarterdeck of British ships of the line such as HMS Victory, though their main weapons were the larger 24- and 32-pound cannons, capable of shattering the hulls of enemy warships and killing the gun crews with a deadly shower of splinters.

Another notable 12-pounder was the 4.62"-caliber bronze smoothbore Mountain Howitzer, a 53-inch short howitzer capable of being disassembled and carried by three pack horses. It was introduced to the US military in 1837 and known as the M1841. During the Mexican War Lieutenant Ulysses S. Grant placed a howitzer in the belfry of a church and used it to shoot at Mexican forces defending Mexico City.

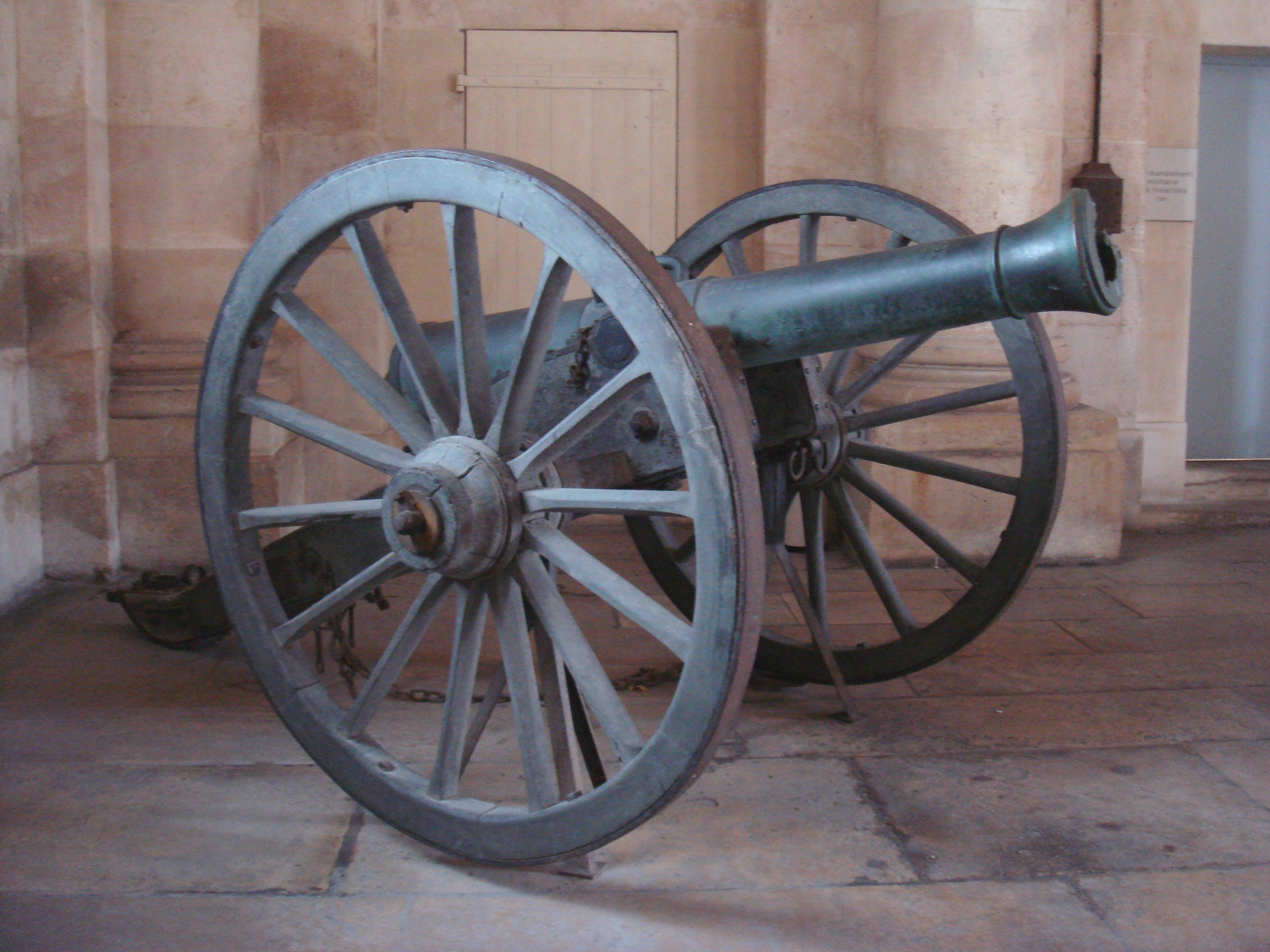
The French canon obusier model 1853 "Canon-obusier de campagne de 12 modèle 1853 Le Hangest". Bronze, founded in Strasbourg in 1853. Caliber: 121 mm. Length: 1.91 m. Weight: 626 kg (with carriage: 1,200 kg). Metal ball or explosive shell 4.1 kg.

In 1853, France introduced the Canon obusier de 12, a 12-pounder capable of using either shells, shot or canisters. Napoleon cannon remained in service during the Victorian period, seeing action in the American Civil War. By this time the Parrott rifle and newer, more powerful Columbiads such as the Rodman gun were being introduced. These fired shells and shot that weighed between 10 and 300 pounds, though the Napoleons remained the most common field guns in Confederate hands.

Later 12-pound cannons included the breechloading RBL 12-pounder 8 cwt Armstrong gun introduced in 1859, Joseph Whitworth's field guns and the boat howitzers invented by John A. Dahlgren and used by the Federal navy during the Civil War.

== See also ==
- 12-pounder gun
- 12-pounder long gun
- Field artillery in the American Civil War
