= Gun-howitzer =

Type of artillery weapon

Gun-howitzer (also referred to as gun howitzer) is a type of artillery weapon that is intended to fulfill the roles of both an ordinary cannon or field gun, and of a howitzer. It is thus able to convey both direct and indirect fire. Modern gun-howitzers are usually identified just as howitzers.

To be able to serve as a howitzer, gun-howitzers are typically built to achieve at least 60° to 70° of elevation. For effective direct fire, the gun-howitzers typically employ a fairly long gun barrel, usually not shorter than 30 calibres. Also, its ammunition has a high muzzle velocity and is usually of large calibre (120 millimetres (4.72 in) or greater).

== History ==
Historically, the first gun-howitzer was the French canon obusier of the mid-19th century. The smooth-bore Canon obusier de 12 was a versatile weapon that quickly replaced both ordinary cannons and howitzers in French service, and became one of the basic types of artillery used by both sides of the American Civil War. Owing to their versality, gun-howitzers gained prominence in the period leading to World War II as a more flexible weapon than ordinary howitzers and were adopted by armies of both the Allies (for instance the Soviet ML-20 152 mm M1937 and British (88 mm) Ordnance QF 25-pounder) and the Axis (German 10.5 cm leFH 18, classified just as howitzer).

A modern example of a gun-howitzer is the M-84 NORA.

After World War II, the barrel length of howitzer designs started to grow gradually in order to obtain longer range, and as a result, separate category of gun-howitzer merged with howitzers and cannons. In modern armies, gun-howitzers are usually identified just as howitzers.

== See also ==
- Gun-mortar
