= Canon obusier =

Type of French cannon using explosive shells

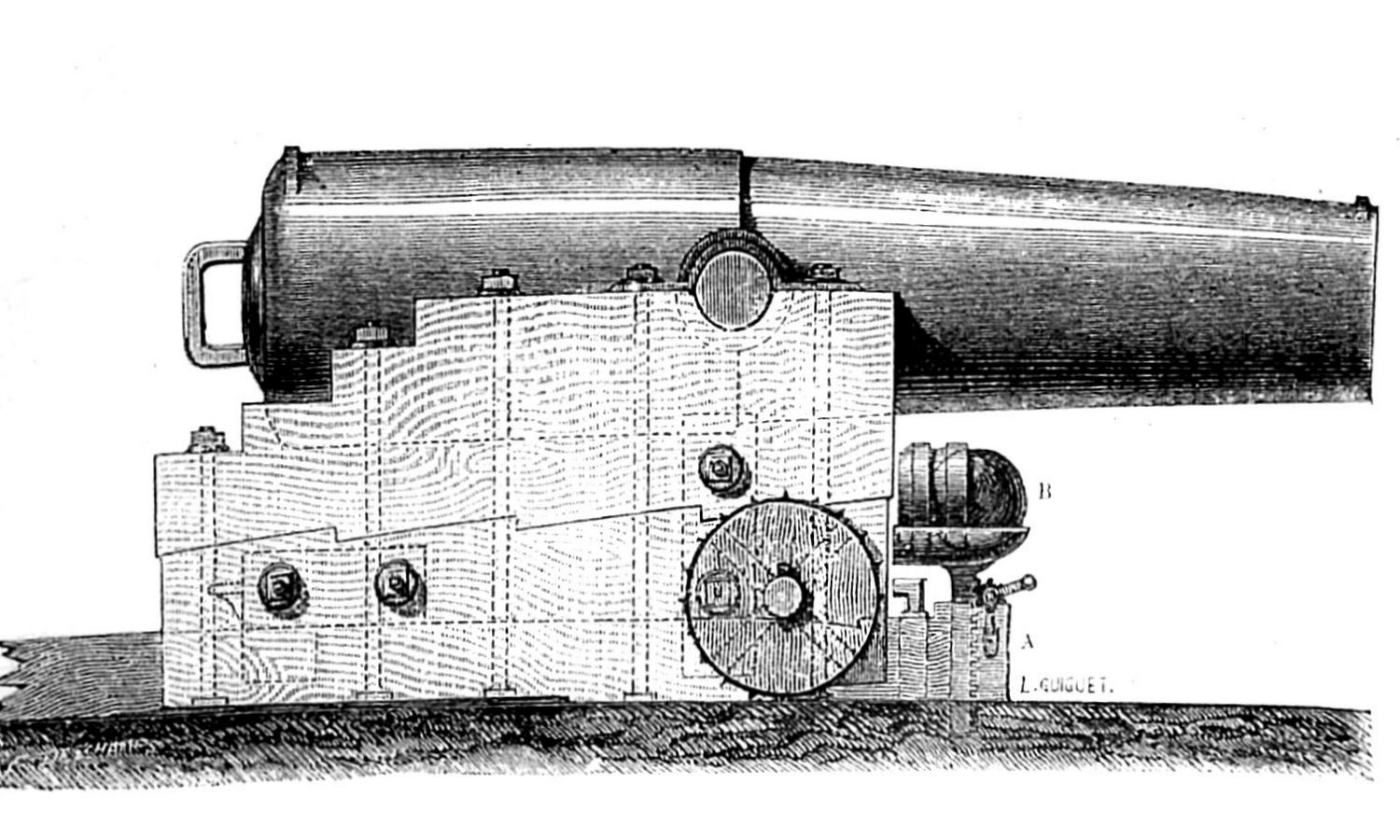
The first "canon-obusier", the Paixhans gun, in 1842. Musée de la Marine.

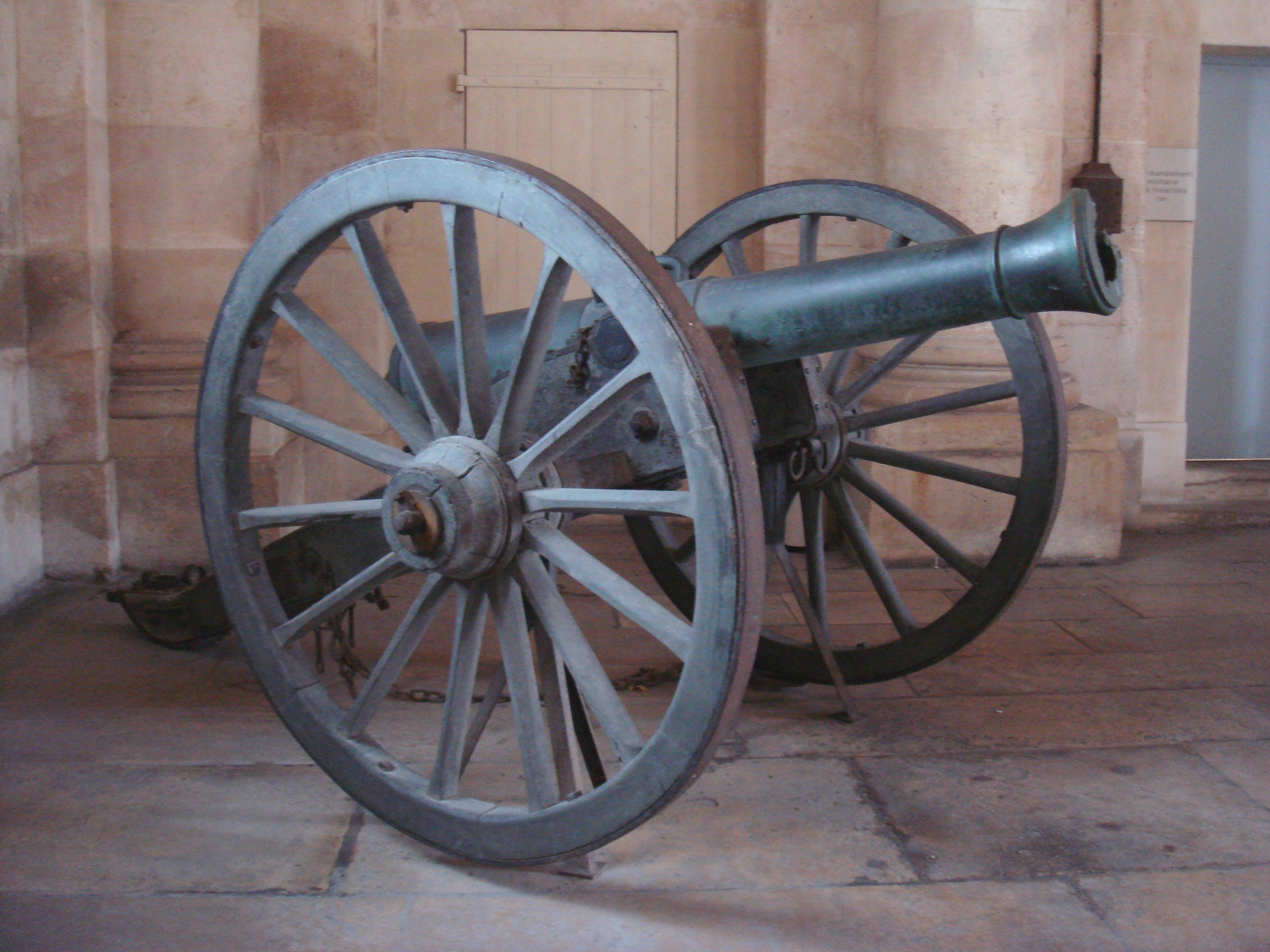
Field shell gun "Canon-obusier de campagne de 12 modèle 1853 Le Hangest". Bronze, founded in Strasbourg in the mid-1850s. Caliber: 121 mm. Length: 1.91 m. Weight: 626 kg (with carriage: 1200 kg). Metal ball or explosive shell 4.1 kg.

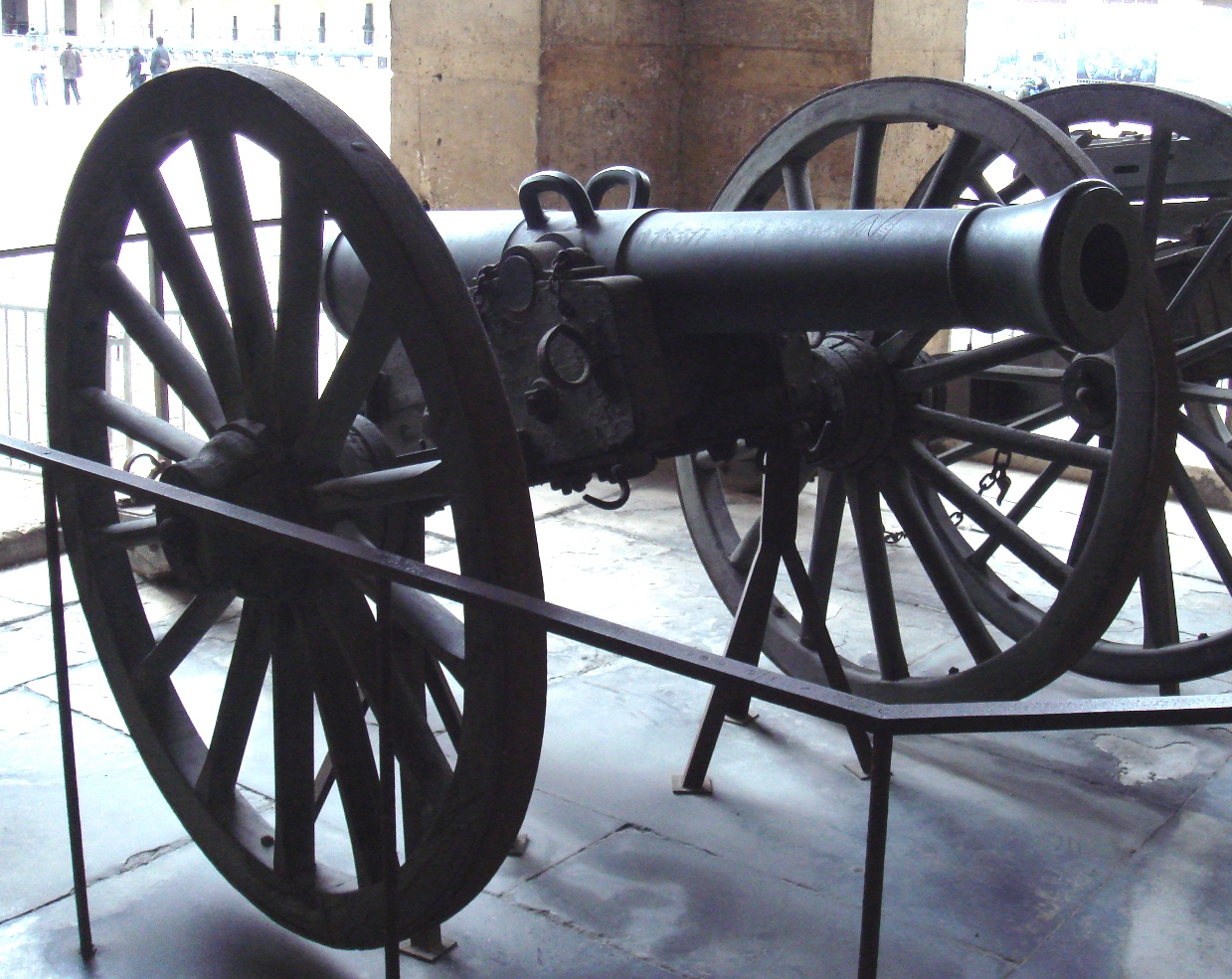
Canon-obusier Le Lassaigne, modèle 1853.

The Canon-obusier (literally "Shell-gun cannon", "gun-howitzer") was a type of cannon developed by France in the 1850s. The canon-obusier was a smoothbore cannon using either explosive shells, solid shot, or canister, and was therefore a vast improvement over previous cannon firing only solid and canister shot, such as the Gribeauval system.

The very first canon-obusiers were naval shell guns, invented in 1823 by Henri-Joseph Paixhans and introduced in the French Navy in 1842. This invention was related to the origin of the development of the Dahlgren shell gun in the United States in 1849.

The French Army introduced the canon-obusier de 12 in 1853. The US version of this type of canon-obusier, commonly called the "12-pounder Napoleon Model 1857", was one of the most-used cannon in the American Civil War. Over 1,100 of these "Napoleons" were manufactured by the Union, and 600 by the Confederacy.

The canon-obusier de 12 was followed by rifled cannon of the Treuille de Beaulieu system which had been introduced in 1858.

The term "Canon-obusier" remained in use after World War I to designate various gun howitzers of the French Army.

== See also ==
- Twelve-pound cannon
- Field artillery in the American Civil War
