= 6th Arkansas Field Battery =

- Active: 1862–1865
- Country: Confederate States of America
- Allegiance: CSA
- Branch: Artillery
- Size: Battery
- Nickname: Washington Artillery
- Engagements: American Civil War: Battle of Helena; Battle of Little Rock; Red River Campaign; Battle of Pleasant Hill; Battle of Mansfield

Commanders
- 1862-1865: Captain Chambers Brady Etter

The 6th Arkansas Field Battery (1862–1865) was a Confederate Army artillery battery during the American Civil War. Also known as: the Washington Artillery and Etter's Battery. The Washington Artillery spent its entire existence in the Department of the Trans-Mississippi, serving in Arkansas and Louisiana.

== Organization ==
After the Battle of Pea Ridge, General Earl Van Dorn was ordered to move his Army of the West across the Mississippi River and cooperate with Confederate forces in Northern Mississippi. Van Dorn stripped the state of military hardware of all types, including almost all the serviceable artillery. When General Thomas C. Hindman arrived on May 31, 1862, to assume command of the new Trans-Mississippi District, he found almost no organized troops to command. He quickly began organizing new regiments, but his most pressing need was for arms for the new forces he was organizing, including the artillery. With Hindman's first order, dated May 31, 1862, at Little Rock, he announced his staff, including the appointment of Major Francis A. Shoup, Chief of Artillery. Shoup had served as chief of artillery under General William J. Hardee during the Battle of Shiloh. Hindman was almost totally destitute of military quality weapons and could hardly arm or issue ammunition to the few troops that he had in June 1862. Until shipments of arms reached Arkansas in July and August 1862, General Hindman struggled to arm his conscripts. When General Hindman discovered that Brigadier General Albert Pike, commanding the Indian Territory, had ten Parrott Guns located at Fort Washita which could not be used for lack of limbers and harnesses, he dispatched a detachment of the 24th Arkansas Infantry Regiment, under Captain L. P. Dodge to Indian Territory (Oklahoma) to bring the artillery to Camp White Sulphur Springs, near Pine Bluff.

Headquarters Trans Miss District

Little Rock, Arks., July 7, 1862

General:

This will be borne to you by Capt. L. P. Dodge, who is sent by General Hindman to receive and bring here the ten parrot guns you now have with you. The General directs me to say that the necessity of taking these guns from you is forced upon him by the scarcity of heavy artillery on this side of the Mississippi and the number of streams navigable for the gunboats of the enemy, which he has to defend. He has two eight inch and one nine inch guns now mounted a DeVall's Bluff, but in case he abandoned that position, as overwhelming numbers of the enemy may compel him to do, he will in all probability lose them as his means for moving them are but meager. In that case, your guns would be invaluable to him—while they may be wholly worthless to you, When White River is lost, his line of defense is the Arkansas, and without artillery pieces which he has, he would be in no condition to make a successful resistance to the advance of the enemy through Arkansas.

Very Respectfully, R. C. Newton

Brig. Genl. A. Pike

Comd'g Indian Country

The Washington Artillery was organized at Washington, Hempstead County, Arkansas, on June 14, 1862, by Captain Chambers Brady Etter. Chambers had previously served in the Hempstead Rifles, a volunteer militia company from the 8th Regiment of Arkansas Militia which became Company B, 3rd Regiment, Arkansas State Troops. Apparently some effort was made to provide the battery with conscripts from Hempstead County, but these men had already been assigned to Colonel Grinstead's 33rd Arkansas Infantry Regiment. General Hindman directed the enrolling agents from surrounding counties to turn over sufficient numbers of conscripts to bring Etter's battery up to 150 men.

The records of the Washington Artillery are highly fragmentary. One muster roll survives, dated January 7, 1863, "in Camp at Little Rock," when the battery was stationed on the grounds of St. John's College. This roll probably only lists a third of the men who actually served with the Washington Artillery during the war. From other sources, such as prisoner-of-war records, pension applications, and postwar reminiscences, an expanded, but certainly a non-authoritative roster of most of the men has been developed. The battery was later designated as the 6th Arkansas Field Battery.

== Service ==
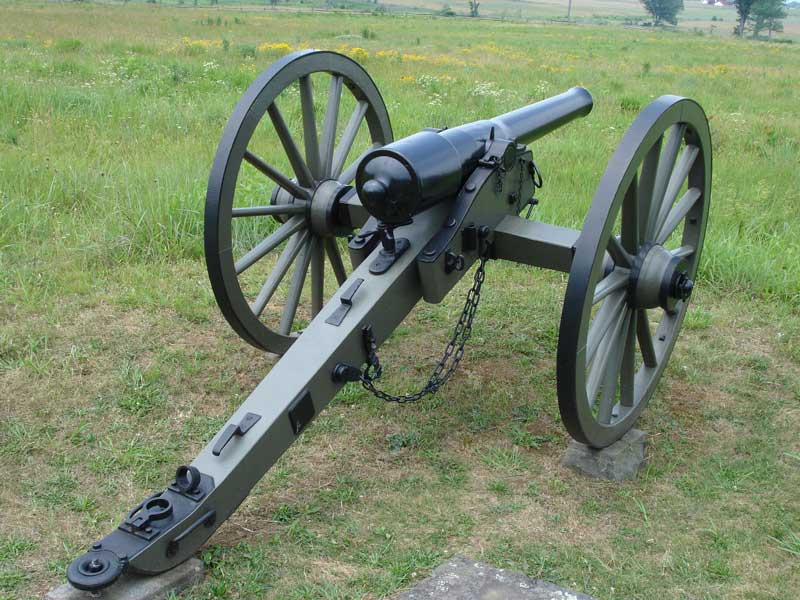
Etter's Battery was initially equipped with six, 10lb Parrott guns

The unit took an active part in the conflicts at Helena, Bayou Fourche, Sabine Cross Roads, and Pleasant Hill. It was assigned to W. R. Bradfute's, R. G. Shaver's, and Fagan's Brigade, and later W. D. Blocher's Battalion of Artillery, Trans-Mississippi Department. On July 1, 1862, General Hindman ordered the new unit to move immediately to Little Rock, but apparently upon learning that the battery was still unarmed, he sent an order to Captain L. P. Dodge which stated:

Headquarters Trans Miss District

Little Rock, Arks., July 8, 1862

Captain,

General Hindman directs that upon your way to this place you turn over to Capt. Etter, commanding company of artillery at Washington, six of the guns placed in your charge by your instructions of yesterday, with all equipment complete. Captain Etter has been directed to procure necessary number of horses & etc., for his battery.

Very Respectfully, R. C. Newton A. A. Genl.

Capt. L. P. Dodge

On special Duty & etc.

Headquarters Trans Miss. District

Little Rock, Arks, July 8, 1862

Captain:

If you have not marched when this reaches you, General Hindman desires you to go into a camp of instruction near Washington, drill and equip your company, fill it up to one hundred and fifty men, and procure horses for a six gun battery, complete. You will be allowed two wagons for your company, one wall tent for every ten men, and one for all the officers. Captain Dodge has been sent to Fort McCulloch, to bring here ten Parrot Guns which Genl. Pike has there. He started from here last night and it will be several weeks before he returns. I enclose you an order for him to turn over to you, on his way here, six of the guns with all the equipment complete. You will present the same to him, and receive the guns on his route here. At such point as you may desire.

Very Respectfully,

R. C. Newton A. A. Genl.

On July 25, 1862 General Hindman send an order to Captain Etter directing him to assign a Lieutenant to duty as acting Assistant Quarter Master and Act'g ACS to purchase supplies at fair prices. Hindman informed Etter that it was too late assign conscripts from Hempstead County to Etter's battery because these men had already been assigned to Col Grindstead's command. Hindman directed the enrolling officer of any adjacent county to turn over a sufficient number of conscripts to raise Etter organization to 150 men.

At the end of September 1862, several orders were issued by General Hindman regarding a movement of Etter's Battery, along with other forces northward to counter and expected Federal push into Northwest Arkansas. On September 9, 1862, Hindman inquired of the telegraph operator at Arkadelphia "Has Etter's battery from Washington passed you yet–has Speight's regt passed, has Waterhouse's Tex regt reached there yet?" On September 28, Hindman issued Special Order #39 which directed Etter's Ark battery to move at once to Elkhorn, and report to Brigadier Gen J. S. Rains. On September 30, 1862 General Hindman directed the telegraph operator at Rockport "If Col Speight has arrived tell him to hasten forward with his reg't to this place asap When Etter's btry arrives give him same instructions."

Whether Etter was able to respond to General Hindman's repeated urgings to move the front is unclear because on October 6, 1862, Etter was ordered to turn over all of his current guns to Col John Dunnington, Chief of the Ordnance Department at the Little Rock Arsenal. Dunnington was ordered to furnish Etter with a new battery. The reason for this reorganization is unclear, but it apparently led to the battery missing the Prairie Gove Campaign. The organization of the 1st Corps as given in General Hindman's Special Order No. 51 dated 24 November 1862 shows Etter's Battery assigned to Bradfute's Brigade of four regiments of Texas dismounted cavalry, but the after action reports of the Battle of Prairie Gove do not list Etter's Battery as having participated.

An examination of the CSR's for the men of Etter's Battery shows a company return for December 1862. Cards for various members of the battery indicate that they were at Little Rock from October to December 1862 (and probably into January 1863). Of the approximately seventy men listed in the battery, the December return shows twelve were either sick or had died, another five had deserted and four were assigned to wagon driving duties. During the same period of time the battery had received only two new enlistments. Additionally, a card for Lt. John C. Arnett states that he left the company on the December 4, 1862, on recruiting duty. Take together, these circumstances may indicate that the unit was struggling to have enough men to man the guns and that this was the reason the battery was left behind for the Prairie Grove campaign.

When General Holmes reported on the organization of the Army of the Trans-Mississippi on December 12, 1862, five days after the Battle of Prairie Grove, he listed Etter's Battery as belonging to Bradfute's Brigade of dismounted Texas Cavalry, of Brigadier General Roan's Division of Major General Hindman's First Corps. On January 24, 1863, General Hindman directed Colonel David Providence, Cief of Artillery to establish a camp of instruction for all the Artillery of Hindman's division. The batteries were to be thoroughly equipped, drilled, and disciplined. General Hindman also directed that Etter's Battery be assigned to Colonel Robert G. Shaver's Brigade.

The battery spent the spring and early summer of 1863 in an artillery camp with the other batteries of Major W. E. Woodruff's artillery battalion near St. John's College in Little Rock. Woodruff was assigned as the Chief of Artillery to Major General D. M. Frost's Division. Woodruff's Artillery Battalion at this time was composed of Etter's Battery, Marshall's Battery, and Blocher's Arkansas Batteries and Tildent and Ruffner's Missouri Batteries and Edgar's Texas Battery. This spring encampment was the only time during the war that Woodruff's Battalion was able to actually practice the artillery drill as a battalion, since the units most usually fought as independent batteries or even sections.

In preparation for the Confederate attack on Union positions at Helena Arkansas on July 4, 1863, Etter's Battery was assigned to Brigadier General James F. Fagan's 2nd Brigade of Major General Sterling Price's Division of Lieutenant General Theophilus H. Holmes's District of Arkansas, in Lieutenant General Edmund Kirby Smith's Trans-Mississippi Department. General John F. Fagan commanded an infantry brigade with a detachment of cavalry. The brigade consisted of the 34th, 35th and 37th and Hawthorn's Arkansas Infantry. He also had Miller's Company, Arkansas Cavalry, Densons' Company, Louisiana Cavalry and the four-gun batteries of Etter and Blocker. General Fagan detached on section of Etter's Battery to support Colonel William H. Brooks, who had been directed to take his 34th Arkansas Infantry Regiment along with Captain Miller's and Captain Densons' cavalry companies to conduct a feint to the south of Helena in order to tie down Federal Troops and protect Fagan's right flank. This section of Etter's battery would engage in a brisk duel with federal artillery and the Union gunboat, the tinclad U.S.S. Tyler. After expending thirteen rounds, Lieutenant Arnett was compelled to withdraw his gun. Following the Battle of Helena, General Price issued Special Orders Number 113 on July 27, 1863, which ordered Captain Etter with the remaining section of his battery to report to General Fagan, who intern was ordered to reunite the two sections of the battery.

During the Federal Campaign in the Summer of 1863 to take Little Rock, Captain Etter's Battery was reassigned to support Colonel Dobbins' Arkansas Cavalry Brigade of Walker's Cavalry Division. Etter's battery was one of the few units that contested the crossing of the Arkansas River by Union forces that would eventually lead to the fall of Little Rock.

Headquarters Cavalry Brigade,

Camp near Washington, Ark.,

December 3, 1863.

MAJOR: I have the honor, in obedience to orders, to submit the following report of the operations, camps, marches, &c., of my command from the day of the battle at Brownsville to the time of the arrival of General Marmaduke's division at Rockport: The engagement at Brownsville occurred on August 25. Colonel [A. S.] Dobbin's brigade (composed of Dobbin's and [Robert C.] Newton's regiments) was encamped at Legate's Bridge, on Bayou Meto.

A little before daylight (September 10), by direction of Colonel Dobbin, commanding division, moved section of [C. B.] Etter's battery into the bend opposite to where the bridge was being constructed. At day light could see workmen engaged in constructing the bridge, which was one-fourth of the way across the river. Sent Major Bull with a party of sharpshooters to support Etter. A little after daylight Etter opened upon the bridge. His second shot took effect, clearing the bridge of workmen. Immediately the enemy opened with three batteries, so posted as to pour a murderous cross-fire in upon Etter, which soon silenced him and drove him out. The sharpshooters kept up a desultory fire, but without much, if any, effect. About 10 a. m. the enemy, having completed his bridge, threw forward two regiments of infantry, and crossed them over onto the bar on this side, his batteries keeping up a continuous and well-directed fire upon the road leading up the river on the south side, and upon the woods in front of his bridge and above it. I withdrew Major Corley to a point above the bridge on the river, and sent Etter on up the river with instructions to halt at Fourche, whither I also sent Corley with his regiment in a few minutes. The enemy now commenced pouring their troops across the bridge in large numbers. By Colonel Dobbin's directions, I left Bull with his regiment to resist the enemy's advance and retard him as much as possible, and went in person to put the other troops in position at Fourche. Brigadier-General Marmaduke arrived with orders to assume command of all the cavalry. Colonel Dobbin being placed in arrest by General Marmaduke's directions, I assumed command of all of Dobbin's force, which included my own brigade, [W. B.] Denson's Louisiana cavalry company, [C. L.] Morgan's Texas squadron, and Pratt's and Etter's batteries.

R. C. NEWTON,

Colonel, Commanding.

Major HENRY EWING,

Assistant Adjutant-General, Marmaduke's Division, & c.

After the fall of Little Rock, Etter's Battery was reassigned to support Brigadier General James C. Tappan's brigade of Brigadier General Thomas James Churchill's Arkansas Division. In the Spring of 1864, the battery, along with Tappan's Brigade moved south into Louisiana in order to counter Union movements in the Red River Campaign.

HEADQUARTERS DISTRICT OF WEST LOUISIANA, Shreveport,

April 18, 1864.

COLONEL: I have the honor to submit the following report and request that the accompanying documents be made a part of it. Document A (March 5) shows my anticipation of the enemy's campaign ...

On the night of the 8th, shortly after the action closed, I ordered a force of cavalry to push on the road from Blair's Landing to Pleasant Hill, taking a cross-road from Mansfield which fell into that road near the ferry over the Bayou Pierre, mentioning in the order that a small force posted on the bluff overlooking Bayou Pierre could delay indefinitely the crossing of that stream from the east. Unfortunately this order was construed to mean that its execution was to follow on possession of Pleasant Hill, so that I could not decide what force we were confronted by on the 9th. It was late after midday before the infantry got up, and a glance at Churchill's troops showed they were too much exhausted to attack. The infantry was ordered to lie down and rest for two hours. Mean time cavalry was pushed right and left to gain information, and a party was sent on the Blair's Landing road by a detour to the left, to procure the intelligence of which I was deprived by the mistake above mentioned. This party did not return until after the attack. At 3 p. m., the infantry being somewhat restored by rest, the plan of attack was formed and the troops put in motion. The Arkansas and Missouri divisions, under Churchill and Parsons, with Etter's and Daniel's batteries, were sent to the right to outflank the enemy, reach the Jesup road, and attack from the south and west.

R. TAYLOR,

Major-General, Commanding.

Colonel S. S. ANDERSON,

Asst. Adjt. General, Trans-Mississippi Department.

Following the Battle of Pleasant Hill, the battery remained in Louisiana for a time to assist with continuing attacks on Union naval forces attempting to withdrawal down the Red River. The battery is next mentioned in a report from Brigadier General Churchill detailing the forces under his command on September 1, 1864:

Headquarters Churchill's Division.

Princeton, September 1, 1864.

Captain BUCK, Assistant Adjutant-General, District of Arkansas:

CAPTAIN: In compliance with circular letter of instructions, Numbers 686, from district headquarters, date August 31, 1864, I have the honor to report the following as the number of regiments, battalions, batteries and independent companies under my command at this place ...

Third. Blocher's artillery battalion, Major Blocher commanding- first, Captain Etter's Arkansas Light battery, Captain Etter commanding; second, Marshall's Arkansas light battery, Captain Marshall commanding.

On September 11, 1864, Brigadier General Churchill issued Special Order Number 72 from Camp Yell which mentioned Etter's Battery:

(Paragraph) III. Major Blocher will move to-morrow morning with Captains Marshall's and Etter's batteries, leaving Captain Trigg's battery in its present encampment until further orders.

In General E. Kirby Smith's September 30, 1864, report on the Organization of the Army of the Trans-Mississippi Department, Etter's Battery is listed as belonging to the 8th Mounted Artillery Battalion, along with Edgar's (Texas) battery. On November 19, 1864, General Smith's issued Special Orders Number 290 from Shreveport, La., which reorganized the Artillery of the Army of the Department of the Trans-Mississippi:

(Paragraph)XIX. The following will in future be the organization of the artillery in the Trans-Mississippi Department: ...

Battalion of Reserve:

First Mississippi Field Battery, Captain Benjamin Wade, 4 guns (mounted); Fourth Louisiana Field Battery, Captain A. J. Cameron, 4 guns (mounted); Fifth Arkansas Field Battery, Captain C. C. Scott, 4 guns (mounted); Sixth Arkansas Field Battery, Captain C. B. Etter, 4 guns (mounted); Ninth Arkansas Field Battery, Captain John T. Trigg, 4 guns (mounted); total, 24.

On December 31, 1864, General E. Kirby Smith listed the battery as belonging to Blocher's Artillery Battalion of Acting Major General Churchill's First Infantry Division of Major General John B. Magruder's Second Army Corps, Army of the Trans-Mississippi.

In December 1865, Captain Etter was serving as the Chief of Artillery, Defenses of Camden, Arkansas. Camden was an important supply and industrial center for the Confederacy. Etter was apparently responsible for the artillery crews manning Fort Lookout (a.k.a. Redoubt A) and Fort Southerland (a.k.a. Redoubt E). The guns of Fort Southerland were spiked when Camden was evacuated and the Confederate forces moved to Shreveport in the final month of the war. Toward the end of the war, the Washington Artillery was converted to siege artillery, manning 8-inch Columbiads and siege guns at Grand Ecore and Alexandria, Louisiana.

== Surrender ==
The battery was surrendered with General Kirby Smith's army on May 26, 1865. The date of the military convention between Confederate General Edmund Kirby Smith and Union General Edward Canby for the surrender of the troops and public property in the Trans-Mississippi Department was May 26, 1865, however, it took a while for parole commissioners to be appointed and for public property to be accounted for. As a result, a final report of field artillery which was part of the accounting process, was not completed until June 1, 1865. According to the final accounting, at the time of the surrender, the battery serving heavy guns at Grand Ecore and Alexandria, La. The remnants of the battery surrendered at Alexandria, Louisiana, June 4, 1865.

== See also ==
- List of Confederate units from Arkansas
- Confederate Units by State
