= 11th Missouri Infantry Regiment (Confederate) =

Infantry regiment of the Confederate States Army

11th Missouri Infantry Regiment Hunter's Missouri Infantry Battalion 8th Missouri Infantry Regiment (Burns')
- Active: August 31, 1862 to June 8, 1865
- Allegiance: Confederate States of America
- Branch: Confederate States Army
- Type: Infantry
- Engagements: American Civil War: Battle of Prairie Grove; Battle of Helena; Battle of Pleasant Hill; Battle of Jenkins' Ferry

The 11th Missouri Infantry Regiment (also known as Hunter's Missouri Infantry Regiment and 8th Missouri Infantry Regiment (Burns')) was an infantry regiment that served in the Confederate States Army during the American Civil War. The unit was mustered into Confederate service on August 31, 1862, although many of the men recruited for the regiment had already seen action at the Battle of Lone Jack. On December 7, the regiment fought at the Battle of Prairie Grove, where the regiment helped defeat Colonel William A. Weer's brigade. Prairie Grove was a Confederate defeat, and the 11th Missouri Infantry retreated into southern Arkansas. Later, the unit began moving against the garrison of Helena, Arkansas. On July 4, 1863, the regiment penetrated the Union works at the Battle of Helena, although its brigade was soon isolated and defeated.

Afterwards, the regiment transferred to Little Rock, where it built fortifications. Union troops then outflanked the city's defenses, leading the Confederates to abandon the position. In 1864, the regiment moved to Louisiana as a response to the Red River campaign. On April 9, the 11th Missouri Infantry fought at the Battle of Pleasant Hill before returning to Arkansas. On April 30, the unit was part of a Confederate attack at the Battle of Jenkins' Ferry, although the charge was repulsed despite initial success. The unit was not heavily engaged after Jenkins' Ferry, and the men of the regiment were paroled on June 8, 1865.

== Organization ==
During the summer of 1862, DeWitt C. Hunter had attempted to recruit men from the Missouri State Guard to join a new regiment, which would be part of the Confederate States Army. However, Hunter was not able to recruit enough men to form a full regiment. Hunter, who had been recruiting near Van Buren, Arkansas, joined a group of recruiters who were heading into Missouri. In August, the group made a camp in the vicinity of Lone Jack, Missouri. On August 16, Hunter's force engaged a Union column commanded by Major Emory S. Foster as part of the Battle of Lone Jack. After a five-hour battle, the Union forces were defeated and forced to withdraw. Foster was severely wounded and captured. In the battle, Hunter's recruits suffered at least 13 casualties. However, Union troops began to concentrate in the area after the battle, and the Confederates retreated back to Arkansas. On August 31, Hunter mustered his recruits into an organized unit as a battalion. More recruits were assigned to the unit, which was upgraded to a regiment and assigned to Brigadier General Mosby M. Parsons' brigade. The unit's company organization as of August 31 was:

- Company A: Jasper County and Lawrence County.
- Company B: Barry County.
- Company C: Barry County.
- Company D: Benton County and Hickory County.
- Company E: Cedar County and Vernon County.
- Company F: Lawrence County.
- Company G: Cedar County and Polk County.
- Company H: Buchanan County, Platte County, and Ray County. (Note: Company H had been transferred from the 35th Arkansas Infantry Regiment.)
- Company I: Cass County.
- Company K: Cass County, Greene County, Jasper County, and Newton County.

Hunter was the regiment's first colonel, Simon P. Burns was the original lieutenant colonel, and Thomas H. Murray was the first major.

== Service history ==
=== 1862 ===
By that fall, Union troops were advancing further into Arkansas. In response, Confederate Major General Thomas Hindman prepared to strike the Union column. On December 7, Hunter's Missouri Regiment fought at the Battle of Prairie Grove as part of Parsons' Brigade as part of Hindman's offensive. Early in the fighting, the brigade was aligned in a supporting position on the Confederate left flank. The regiment was second-to-the-left in the brigade alignment; Caldwell's Missouri Regiment was on the brigade's far left. Towards the end of the battle, Parsons' brigade attacked Colonel William A. Weer's Union brigade. Parsons' line was longer than Weer's, and the Confederates were able to turn the flank of Weer's position, forcing the Union men back. Parsons' Brigade then made a second charge, but the alignment of Parsons' Brigade cut Hunter's and Caldwell's Regiments off, preventing them from participating in the second charge, which failed. Hunter's Regiment reported 51 casualties at Prairie Grove. The regiment then fell back to Van Buren, and later to Little Rock, Arkansas.

=== 1863 ===
On February 4, 1863, Colonel Hunter resigned; Burns replaced him as commander of the regiment. On May 3, the regiment was designated as the 8th Missouri Infantry Regiment by Major General Sterling Price. Towards the end of June, the regiment moved towards Helena, Arkansas, as part of a Confederate attempt to capture the Union-held town. During the Battle of Helena on July 4, Parsons' brigade attacked a Union position known as Graveyard Hill. The brigade broke through, but other elements of the Confederate attack were unable to penetrate the Union line. As a result, Union troops were able to concentrate on Parsons' Brigade. After suffering heavy casualties, the brigade retreated from the field; the regiment's total casualty count at Helena was 159 men.

After Helena, the regiment fell back to Des Arc, Arkansas and then to Little Rock, where the men built fortifications. In August, Union Major General Frederick Steele threatened the city, moving around the Confederate fortifications to attack at an undefended point. Parsons' Brigade then abandoned the position on September 10 without fighting. After leaving Little Rock, the brigade moved to Arkadelphia, Arkansas, and then to Camden, Arkansas. On December 15, the regiment was renamed as the 11th Missouri Infantry Regiment.

=== 1864–1865 ===
Map of the Red River campaign

In January 1864, the regiment transferred to Spring Hill, Arkansas. On March 24, a new division was formed, and Parsons was assigned to command the division. The division contained two brigades; one of which was commanded by Colonel Burns, the other was commanded by Colonel John Bullock Clark Jr. The 11th Missouri Infantry was assigned to Burns' Brigade; Lieutenant Colonel Thomas H. Murray replaced Burns as regimental commander. In April, the regiment was sent to support Major General Richard Taylor's force, which was fighting against a Union advance up the Red River. The regiment joined Taylor on April 9 at Pleasant Hill, Louisiana. Later that day, the regiment participated in the Battle of Pleasant Hill. Parsons' division, which was on the right flank of the Confederate line, attacked the Union line. The attack was initially successful, driving in part of the Union line, but a Union counterattack defeated the Confederates, who retreated in some disarray. The 11th Missouri Infantry suffered 49 casualties at Pleasant Hill.

After Pleasant Hill, Parsons' Division began moving against Camden, which was held by Steele's Union force. Steele evacuated Camden, and was pursued by the Confederates, who caught up with him on April 30 at the crossing of the Saline River. The 11th Missouri Infantry was in Burns' Brigade along with the 10th Missouri Infantry Regiment, 12th Missouri Infantry Regiment, 16th Missouri Infantry Regiment, Pindall's Missouri Sharpshooter Battalion, and Lesueur's Missouri Battery. At the Battle of Jenkins' Ferry on the 30th, Parsons' division arrived at 9:00 a.m., but it took about an hour for the division to fully deploy. Burns' Brigade was aligned on Parsons' left, and Clark's Brigade held the right. When the brigade attacked, it encountered the 33rd Iowa Infantry and the 12th Kansas Infantry Regiments holding a position in some woods. After about half an hour of fighting at very close range, Burns' Brigade was able to outflank the two Union regiments and drive them back. However, Union reinforcements arrived in the form of the 40th Iowa Infantry and the 27th Wisconsin Infantry Regiments. Those two regiments, combined with the survivors of the 33rd Iowa and the 12th Kansas, counterattacked, driving Burns' Brigade from the field. Eventually, Steele's Union force was able to escape across the Saline. At Jenkins' Ferry, the 11th Missouri Infantry suffered 17 casualties. Jenkins' Ferry was the regiment's last major action. For the rest of the war, the regiment was encamped at various locations in Arkansas and Louisiana before being paroled on June 8, 1865, at Shreveport, Louisiana. After being paroled, the survivors of the regiment were sent back to Missouri via steamboat.

== See also ==
- List of Missouri Confederate Civil War units

== Sources ==
- Forsyth, Michael J. (2003). The Camden Expedition of 1864. Jefferson, North Carolina: McFarland & Company, Inc. ISBN 0-7864-1554-1.
- Gerteis, Louis S. (2012). The Civil War in Missouri. Columbia, Missouri: University of Missouri Press. ISBN 978-0-8262-1972-5.
- Johnson, Ludwell H. (1993). Red River Campaign: Politics and Cotton in the Civil War. Kent, Ohio: Kent State University Press. ISBN 0-87338-486-5.
- Kennedy, Frances H., ed. (1998). The Civil War Battlefield Guide (2nd ed.). Boston/New York: Houghton Mifflin. ISBN 978-0-395-74012-5.
- McGhee, James E. (2008). Guide to Missouri Confederate Regiments, 1861–1865. Fayetteville, Arkansas: University of Arkansas Press. ISBN 978-1-55728-870-7.
- Shea, William L. (2009). Fields of Blood: The Prairie Grove Campaign. Chapel Hill: University of North Carolina Press. ISBN 978-0-8078-3315-5.
