= 12th Missouri Infantry Regiment (Confederate) =

Infantry regiment of the Confederate States Army

12th Missouri Infantry Regiment Ponder's Missouri Infantry 9th Missouri Infantry Regiment
- Active: October 22, 1862 to September 29, 1864
- Allegiance: Confederate States of America
- Branch: Confederate States Army
- Type: Infantry
- Size: Regiment
- Engagements: American Civil War: Battle of Prairie Grove; Battle of Helena; Battle of Pleasant Hill; Battle of Jenkins' Ferry

The 12th Missouri Infantry Regiment was an infantry regiment that served in the Confederate States Army during the American Civil War. After mustering into Confederate service on October 22, 1862, as White's Missouri Infantry, the regiment, as Ponder's Missouri Infantry, fought in the Battle of Prairie Grove on December 7, where it charged the Union lines several times. On May 3, 1863, the regiment was named the 9th Missouri Infantry Regiment, and fought under that name until December 15, 1863, when it was renamed the 12th Missouri Infantry Regiment. On July 4, 1863, the regiment, as part of Brigadier General Mosby M. Parsons' brigade, broke through the Union lines at the Battle of Helena. However, Parsons' flanks were exposed, and the Confederates were driven from the field, suffering heavy losses. After Helena, only 168 men remained in the regiment. On November 22, 1863, the survivors of the regiment were combined into two companies, which were then attached to the 10th Missouri Infantry Regiment, although the 12th Missouri Infantry was still treated as a separate unit for reporting purposes. In April 1864, the 12th Missouri Infantry fought at the battles of Pleasant Hill and Jenkins' Ferry. On September 29, 1864, the survivors of the 12th Missouri Infantry were officially merged into the 10th Missouri Infantry, ending the 12th's separate service career.

== Background and formation ==
In 1861, at the outbreak of the American Civil War, the state of Missouri, which was strategically located, did not vote to secede despite being a slave state. However, Governor Claiborne F. Jackson, who supported secession, organized like-minded state militia into a camp outside of St. Louis. On May 10, Nathaniel Lyon, a brigadier general in the Union Army, dispersed Jackson's camp, although a riot in St. Louis followed. Jackson responded on May 12 by forming the Missouri State Guard and placing Sterling Price, a major general of state troops, in charge of it. On June 15, Lyon's force moved against the state capital of Jefferson City, causing Jackson and the pro-secession elements of the state legislature to evacuate to Boonville. Lyon took Boonville two days later by forcing out a group of Missouri State Guard soldiers led by Colonel John S. Marmaduke. Price and Jackson then fell back into the southwestern portion of the state.

Price then joined forces with Brigadier General Ben McCulloch's Confederate States Army force. In August, the two forces, under the command of McCulloch, were encamped near Springfield. On August 10, Lyon attacked the Confederate camp, in the ensuing Battle of Wilson's Creek, the Union forces were defeated and Lyon killed. After Wilson's Creek, Price and the Missouri State Guard moved north, capturing a Union garrison at Lexington after a siege in September. However, Union forces gathered at Tipton, and Price fell back into southwestern Missouri. In November, Jackson and the pro-secession legislators held a vote approving secession while at Neosho; Missouri joined the Confederate States of America as a government-in-exile. The anti-secession legislators had previously held their own convention in Jefferson City, rejecting secession. In February 1862, Union pressure led Price to leave Missouri for Arkansas, where he joined forces with Major General Earl Van Dorn. In March, Price joined the Confederate States Army, receiving a commission as a major general. Later that month, Van Dorn was defeated at the Battle of Pea Ridge, establishing Union control of Missouri. Most of the men of the Missouri State Guard eventually left the unit to join Confederate States Army formations. Union control of Missouri seemed secure enough that one officer stated that "[there was] no Rebel flag now flying in Missouri". However, this was disproved when Confederate recruiters and raiders entered the state later that summer. White's Missouri Infantry was first organized in late August 1862 from veterans of the Missouri State Guard. James D. White, the regiment's first colonel, had been authorized to form a regiment for service in the Confederate States Army by Major General Thomas Hindman. The unit was originally based in Pocahontas, Arkansas; it fought in a small skirmish near the town in September. On October 22, the regiment officially entered Confederate service while at Yellville, Arkansas. Willis M. Ponder was the regiment's first lieutenant colonel, and Thomas B. Sandford was the first major. As of the date of muster, the regiment contained 10 companies, designated by the letters A–I and K. All were Missouri-raised, except for Company G, which also contained men from Arkansas.

== Service history ==
=== 1862 ===
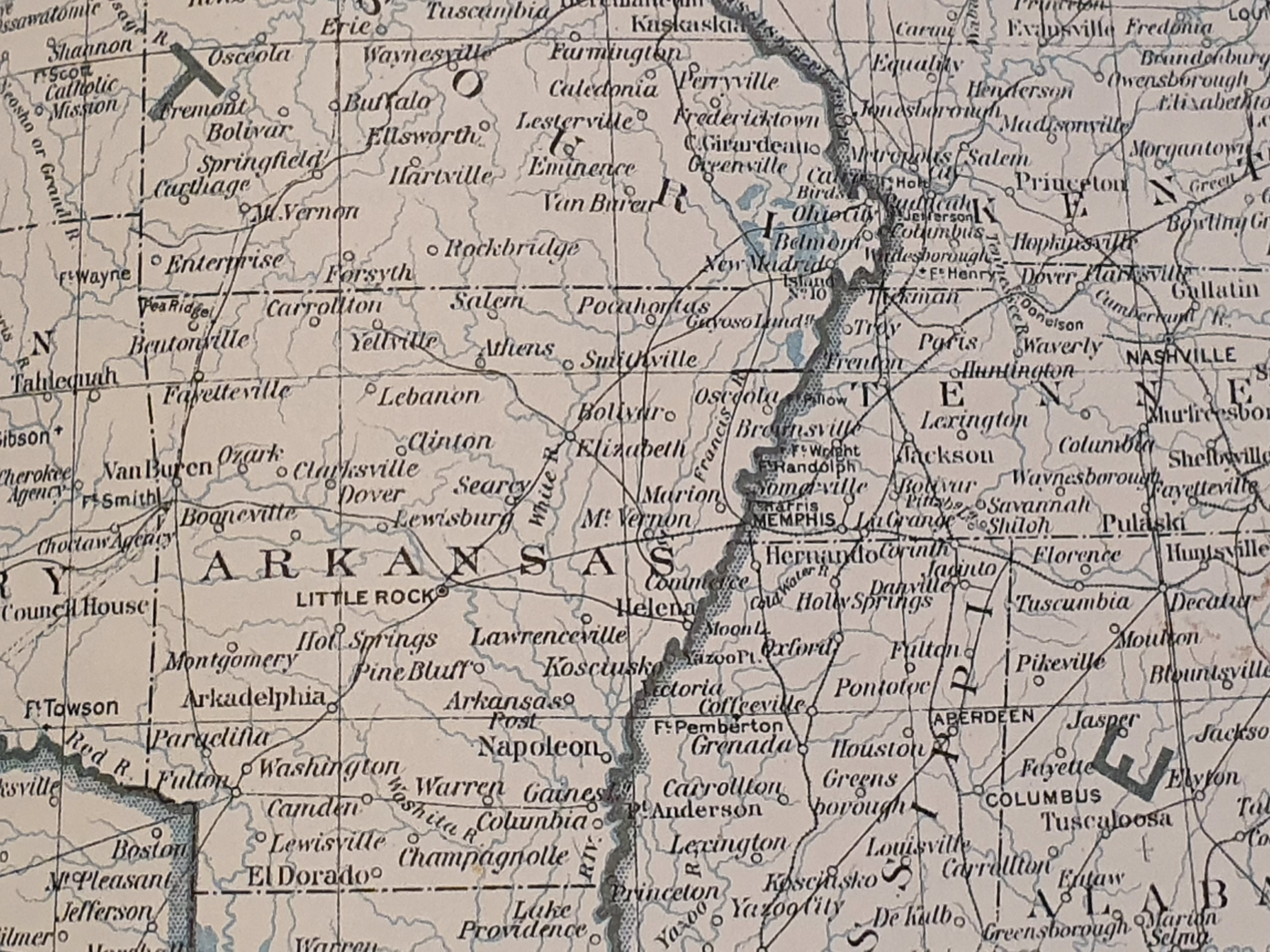
19th-century map of Arkansas, with key locations marked

After mustering into Confederate service, the regiment transferred to a camp near Van Buren, Arkansas. The regiment was assigned to Colonel Alexander E. Steen's brigade in November, although Steen was later replaced by Brigadier General Mosby M. Parsons. On November 30, the regiment began moving towards Prairie Grove, Arkansas. Ponder commanded the regiment during the movement, as White was ill. During the early stages of the Battle of Prairie Grove on December 7, the regiment (under the name Ponder's Missouri Infantry) aligned with the rest of Parsons' brigade in a position supporting the Confederate left flank. Late in the battle, Ponder's regiment, along with the rest of Parsons' brigade and Clark's Missouri Infantry Regiment, attacked a Union position. The Confederate attack eventually forced the Union line back, but was halted by Union artillery fire. A further Confederate attack drove back a reformed Union line, with Ponder's regiment and Steen's Missouri Infantry Regiment turning the Union left flank. The Confederates made another attempt against the Union line, but in the advance to attack, Caldwell's Missouri Regiment and Hunter's Missouri Infantry Regiment had their lines of advance cut off by other units, preventing them from joining the charge. Ponder's regiment was on the right of the Confederate attack along with Steen's regiment, but heavy fire from two Union artillery batteries and the 11th Kansas Infantry Regiment repulsed the two regiments. Steen was killed and the two regiments routed, ending the Battle of Prairie Grove. At Prairie Grove, Ponder's regiment suffered 72 casualties. After the defeat at Prairie Grove, the regiment returned to Van Buren.

=== 1863 ===
In January 1863, the regiment transferred from Van Buren to Little Rock, Arkansas. On May 3, the regiment was given the name of 9th Missouri Infantry Regiment by Price's headquarters. By June 11, White had recovered enough from his illness to regain command of the regiment. On July 4, the 9th Missouri Infantry was part of a Confederate assault against a Union force occupying Helena, Arkansas. Parsons' brigade attacked Graveyard Hill and captured it; the regimental flag of the 9th Missouri Infantry was raised over the captured position. However, the brigade's success left both of its flanks exposed, and Union troops were able to concentrate against the brigade. After a five-hour fight, the Confederates were driven back from Graveyard Hill with heavy losses, including many men captured. The 9th Missouri Infantry lost 62 men killed or wounded in the battle; the number of missing men was not reported. Shortly after the battle, the regiment had only 168 men available for duty.

Beginning in August, the regiment built fortifications designed to defend Little Rock against Union attack. On August 28, White left the regiment to serve as a provost marshal and was replaced as regiment commander by Ponder, who was promoted to colonel. In September, Union forces advanced against Little Rock, but moved around the Confederate fortifications. In response, the regiment retreated to southern Arkansas without fighting. On November 22, the survivors of the regiment were combined into two companies, which were then attached to the 10th Missouri Infantry Regiment. (Note: The 10th Missouri Infantry Regiment was Steen's former regiment.) Despite being attached to the 10th Missouri Infantry, the 9th Missouri Infantry was still treated as a separate regiment for reporting purposes. On December 15, the 9th Missouri Infantry was renamed the 12th Missouri Infantry.

=== 1864 ===
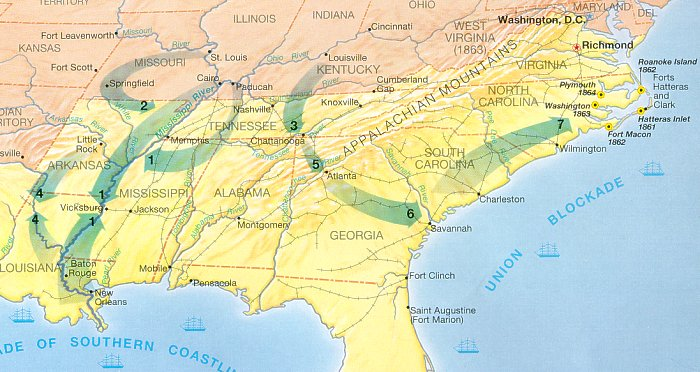
Map of Union movements in the Western Theater; the arrows marked 4 mark the Camden expedition and the Red River campaign

In March 1864, Parsons was elevated to divisional command. Parsons' division contained two brigades: one commanded by Colonel John Bullock Clark Jr. and the other commanded by Colonel Simon P. Burns. As part of Burns' brigade, the 12th Missouri Infantry moved to the support of Major General Richard Taylor in April; Taylor was threatened by a Union advance against Shreveport, Louisiana. The unit reached Taylor's position on April 9, and fought in the Battle of Pleasant Hill later that day. Parsons' division was aligned on the Confederate right flank. Within Parsons' division, Burns' brigade was on the left and Clark's brigade was on the right. The Confederate attack was initially successful, breaking a portion of the Union line. However, a Union flank attack drove back Parsons' line, causing the units to Parsons' left to fall back. The Confederates put up firm resistance at first, but eventually the fighting retreat turned into a rout. However, the Union troops retreated from the field, despite repulsing the Confederate attack. The 12th Missouri Infantry lost 14 men at Pleasant Hill.

After a brief rest, the regiment then began moving north towards Camden, Arkansas, which was held by Major General Frederick Steele's Union force. Steele retreated in the face of the Confederate advance, but was caught at the crossing of the Saline River. At the Battle of Jenkins' Ferry on April 30, Parsons' division deployed at around 10:00 a.m., having arrived on the field an hour earlier. Burn's brigade, including the 12th Missouri Infantry, was the left brigade in Parsons' alignment. When Burns' brigade attacked the Union lines, it encountered the 33rd Iowa Infantry and the 12th Kansas Infantry Regiments. Eventually, Burns' brigade was able to outflank the two Union regiments, forcing them to retreat. However, Union reinforcements soon arrived, and a counterattack drove Burns' brigade from the field. Burns' brigade later aligned to support a Texas division, but Steele retreated across the Saline River before Burns' brigade was reengaged. The regiment reported three casualties from the Jenkins' Ferry fighting. Jenkins' Ferry was the 12th Missouri Infantry's last major fight. On September 29, the regiment was officially consolidated into the 10th Missouri Infantry while stationed in Arkansas, ceasing to exist as a separate unit. General Edmund Kirby Smith surrendered the Confederate Trans-Mississippi Department on June 2, 1865. On June 8, the men of the 10th Missouri Infantry were paroled at Shreveport; they were later shipped back to Missouri via steamboat.

== See also ==
- List of Missouri Confederate Civil War units

== Sources ==
- Forsyth, Michael J. (2003). The Camden Expedition of 1864. Jefferson, North Carolina: McFarland & Company, Inc. ISBN 0-7864-1554-1.
- Gerteis, Louis S. (2012). The Civil War in Missouri. Columbia, Missouri: University of Missouri Press. ISBN 978-0-8262-1972-5.
- Gottschalk, Phil (1991). In Deadly Earnest: The Missouri Brigade. Columbia, Missouri: Missouri River Press. ISBN 0-9631136-1-5.
- Johnson, Ludwell H. (1993). Red River Campaign: Politics and Cotton in the Civil War. Kent, Ohio: Kent State University Press. ISBN 0-87338-486-5.
- Kennedy, Frances H., ed. (1998). The Civil War Battlefield Guide (2nd ed.). Boston/New York: Houghton Mifflin. ISBN 978-0-395-74012-5.
- McGhee, James E. (2008). Guide to Missouri Confederate Regiments, 1861–1865. Fayetteville, Arkansas: University of Arkansas Press. ISBN 978-1-55728-870-7.
- Shea, William L. (2009). Fields of Blood: The Prairie Grove Campaign. Chapel Hill: University of North Carolina Press. ISBN 978-0-8078-3315-5.
- Wright, John D. (2013). The Routledge Encyclopedia of Civil War Biographies. New York, New York: Routledge. ISBN 978-0-415-87803-6.
