= 9th Missouri Sharpshooter Battalion =

Infantry battalion of the Confederate States Army

9th Missouri Sharpshooter Battalion Pindall's Missouri Sharpshooter Battalion
- Flag of the type carried by the battalion
- Active: November 29, 1862, to June 7, 1865
- Country: Confederate States of America
- Branch: Confederate States Army
- Type: Sharpshooter
- Size: battalion
- Engagements: American Civil War: Battle of Prairie Grove; Battle of Helena; Battle of Pleasant Hill; Battle of Jenkins Ferry

The 9th Missouri Sharpshooter Battalion, also known as Pindall's Missouri Sharpshooter Battalion, was a unit that served in the Confederate States Army during the American Civil War. The battalion was formed in late 1862, in compliance with an earlier authorization by the Confederate States Congress for each brigade to have an associated battalion of sharpshooters. When first formed, the men had no unique qualifications to serve as sharpshooters and were drawn from a defunct artillery battery, a partisan rangers unit, and infantrymen. The unit's first major battle was the Battle of Prairie Grove in December 1862.

The first half of 1863 saw the battalion serving at various points in Arkansas. When a Confederate force attacked the Federal-held city of Helena, Arkansas, on July 4, in the Battle of Helena, the 9th Missouri Sharpshooters saw action. The unit was present in the Little Rock area during the Little Rock campaign later in the year, but saw no action. In March 1864, it moved into Louisiana to oppose the Red River campaign, during which it fought at the Battle of Pleasant Hill in early April. After Pleasant Hill, the battalion returned to Arkansas and was engaged at the Battle of Jenkins' Ferry on April 30. The 9th Missouri Sharpshooter Battalion spent the rest of the war at various points in Louisiana and Arkansas before the Confederate forces in the Trans-Mississippi Theater surrendered on May 26, 1865. The steamboat carrying the unit back to Missouri sank in the Red River of the South, killing at least 12 men of the battalion.

== Background and formation ==
At the beginning of the American Civil War in 1861, the state of Missouri was politically divided. The Governor of Missouri, Claiborne Fox Jackson supported secession and the Confederate States of America, and created the pro-secession Missouri State Guard. Opposing the secessionists were troops from the Federal army. In July, the anti-secession elements of the Missouri legislature voted to remain in the United States, while in November, Jackson and the pro-secession legislators voted to join the Confederacy. The resulting Confederate government of Missouri functioned as a government-in-exile. Pro-secession and Confederate forces won several battles, but by the end of 1861, were restricted to the southwestern portion of the state. In March of the following year, a Federal victory over Confederate and Missouri State Guard forces at the Battle of Pea Ridge in Arkansas resulted in the Federals gaining control of Missouri.

On April 21, 1862, the Confederate States Congress authorized each brigade of infantry to be assigned a battalion of sharpshooters. Per law, these battalions were to be armed with long-range rifles and were to consist of three to six companies. On November 25, Major General Thomas C. Hindman ordered his subordinate division commanders to form the sharpshooter battalions if practical. One of Hindman's division commanders, Brigadier General Mosby Monroe Parsons, had two weeks earlier formed a sharpshooter company to serve with a brigade of Missouri troops. Two more sharpshooter companies were formed on November 29, and the three were consolidated together into a battalion commanded by Major Lebbeus A. Pindall, at a camp near Fort Smith, Arkansas. According to historian James McGhee, the men assigned to the sharpshooter unit do not appear to have been exceptional marksmen or to have been otherwise uniquely qualified to serve as sharpshooters. The first of the three companies was drawn from a defunct artillery battery (Foster's Battery) and a partisan ranger unit (Lawther's Partisan Ranger Regiment), while the others were pulled from infantry units.

== Service history ==
=== Prairie Grove ===
Sites associated with the battalion in 1862 and 1863

After forming, the battalion moved north as part of a brigade commanded by Parsons, as Brigadier General Daniel M. Frost was now in divisional command. On December 6, Parsons' brigade (including Pindall's battalion), along with some Arkansas cavalry, advanced to Reed's Mountain. This position controlled the Cane Hill road. The Arkansans were initially unable to drive a small force of Federal cavalry off the mountain, so Parsons was asked to support them. He sent Pindall's battalion into the fray. Not long before sundown, the Federal forces withdrew off of the mountain.

On December 7, in the Battle of Prairie Grove, Parsons' brigade was held in reserve to guard against a Federal flank attack for the first part of the battle. In the afternoon, Parsons' brigade moved to the front, but Hindman ordered Pindall's battalion to remain in the rear near a church with Tilden's Missouri Battery. At this time, the battalion was about 130 men strong. It remained in the rear for about an hour, but was ordered forward when Parsons requested support for his right flank. Parsons ordered an attack, which had some success. Shortly before sunset, Parsons ordered another attack, but it was repulsed. No surviving official report by Pindall about the unit's actions during the battle is known to exist. (Note: Very few of the Missouri units below the brigade level filed official reports for Prairie Grove, Frost's report did not address the repulsed attack at the end of the battle, and Parsons' report glossed over it.) The unit suffered three casualties during the fighting, all wounded.

Pindall's battalion then served in front of the brigade line as a screen until the Confederates withdrew at around midnight. Hindman's army initially fell back to Van Buren, where it remained for about three weeks before retreating to Little Rock. Pindall's battalion was stationed at Little Rock until May 1863, when it moved to a camp along the White River, upriver from Jacksonport. On June 7, the battalion was strengthened when a company from the 2nd Northeast Missouri Cavalry Regiment was integrated into the unit. (Note: The 2nd Northeast Cavalry Regiment had briefly existed in mid-1862 during a recruiting expedition led by Joseph C. Porter but had been disbanded.)

=== Helena and Little Rock ===
Confederate Lieutenant General Theophilus Holmes led an offensive against the Federal-held city of Helena, Arkansas, with hopes of relieving some of the pressure on Vicksburg, Mississippi. In late June, Pindall's battalion began moving towards Helena, and arrived in the area on July 3, 1863. When the Confederates attacked in the Battle of Helena the next day, the battalion was aligned in front of Parsons' brigade. Along with a unit of Arkansas troops from the local area, Pindall's battalion drove in the Federal skirmish line, and the Missouri sharpshooters then opened fire on the Federal soldiers manning artillery pieces in a defensive work known as Battery C atop Graveyard Hill.

Two Confederate attacks against Graveyard Hill failed, but the third captured Battery C. The first Confederate soldier to enter Battery C may have been an officer from Pindall's battalion. However, the Confederates who had taken Graveyard Hill were unsupported. A continued attack towards Helena was repulsed, and the Confederates on Graveyard Hill came under concentrated Federal fire and were forced to retreat. According to historian Ed Bearss, Pindall's battalion suffered 43 casualties; historian James E. McGhee states that the battalion's losses at Helena were instead 39 men. It was only 190 men strong on July 5. After Helena, the unit withdrew with the Confederate army to Des Arc and then back to Little Rock. In August, Parsons, without authority, sought to transfer men from a cavalry unit to an artillery battery. When the cavalrymen and their officers were not willing to switch branches of service, Parsons' brigade inspector used Pindall's battalion and part of the 10th Missouri Infantry Regiment to force the transfer. In August, Federal forces from Helena advanced towards Little Rock in the Little Rock campaign. Pindall's battalion joined other Confederate infantry in building fortifications across the Arkansas River from the city, but Federal cavalry crossed the river further downstream, avoiding the defenses. While Confederate cavalry fought Federal forces in the Battle of Bayou Fourche on September 10, the rest of the Confederate troops abandoned Little Rock. Pindall's battalion saw no fighting in the campaign.

=== Pleasant Hill and Jenkins' Ferry ===
Map showing movements leading up to the battles of Mansfield and Pleasant Hill

Pindall's battalion withdrew with the rest of the Confederate army into southwestern Arkansas, and spent the winter of 1863–1864 at Camden and Spring Hill. In March 1864, Federal forces led by Major General Nathaniel P. Banks began the Red River Campaign, a push up the Red River of the South towards Shreveport, Louisiana. The campaign was politically and economically motivated, hoping to establish Abraham Lincoln's 1863 plan for political reconstruction in Louisiana, prevent collaboration between Confederate forces and the Second French intervention in Mexico, and acquire cotton to send back to Federal textile mills. Parsons' brigade, including Pindall's battalion, was transferred to northwestern Louisiana in March to reinforce Confederate forces opposing Banks' campaign. While encamped south of Shreveport in late March, Parsons was elevated to division command, and Pindall's battalion became part of a brigade commanded by Colonel Simon P. Burns. McGhee believes that this time frame was when Pindall's battalion was formally designated the 9th Missouri Sharpshooter Battalion.

Parsons' division began moving towards the front lines on April 5, but did not arrive until four days later, too late to participate in the Confederate victory at the Battle of Mansfield. After their arrival in the afternoon of April 9, Parsons' division formed on the right of the Confederate line as part of the deployments for the Battle of Pleasant Hill. Parsons' men attacked with initial success, defeating a Federal brigade, but were then counterattacked in the flank by additional Federal troops. The 9th Missouri Sharpshooter Battalion was caught in the resulting melee that ended with Parsons' men being driven to the rear. The collapse of Parsons' division prevented a Confederate success like the one the day before at Mansfield. Pindall's unit lost 2 killed and 8 wounded in the fighting at Pleasant Hill.

On March 23, Federal forces commanded by Major General Frederick Steele had left Little Rock with the intention of moving south towards Shreveport to join Banks' campaign. Steele's offensive has become known as the Camden Expedition. With insufficient quantities of food and forage, Steele decided to instead move towards Camden on April 12, which the Federal forces occupied three days later. As Banks' campaign had been defeated, Confederate General E. Kirby Smith decided to take Parsons' and two other divisions into Arkansas to attack Steele, with the march beginning on April 14. Confederate troops defeated elements of Steele's army at the Battle of Poison Spring (April 18) and the Battle of Marks' Mills (April 25), and having learned of Banks' defeat, Steele ordered a retreat from Camden on April 26. Smith's Confederates pursued.

During the pursuit, heavy rains began, and the ground turned muddy and swampy. The Confederates caught up to Steele on April 30, and attacked in the Battle of Jenkins' Ferry. The terrain was waterlogged and allowed for only a portion of the Confederate force to be engaged at one time. Burns' brigade went to the Confederate right. Charging, Burns' brigade forced Federal troops back about 0.25 miles (0.4 km) before being repulsed by reinforcements. Parsons' men were eventually ordered to withdraw so that Walker's Greyhounds could enter the fighting. All of the Confederate attacks at Jenkins' Ferry were repulsed, and Steele's army was able to reach Little Rock safely in early May. The 9th Missouri Sharpshooter Battalion had 1 man killed and 4 wounded; the unit was cited by Burns for "sturdy and unwavering courage".

=== War's end ===
Post-Jenkins' Ferry encampments of the battalion

Along with the rest of Parsons' division, the battalion spent the rest of the war camped at various points in Arkansas and Louisiana. On May 1, Smith's force moved to Tulip, Arkansas, where Parsons' division remained until May 12, although the rest of the Confederate force continued south earlier. The men then continued to the Haynesville, Louisiana, area, before returning to Arkansas. Parsons' division made a long-term encampment near El Dorado. When Parsons' men left the camp near El Dorado in August, the division was separated, with Burns' brigade sent to Monticello. While at Monticello, Burns' brigade skirmished with Federal troops on September 10, which was the unit's last combat experience.

Burns' brigade spent the winter of 1864–1865 at Camden. Pindall's battalion was strengthened on January 20, 1865, with the addition of two companies that had been recruited during Price's Missouri Expedition in 1864. That same day, Pindall was promoted to lieutenant colonel; Gabriel S. Kendrick became the unit's major in place of Pindall. The battalion now consisted of six companies, all of whom consisted of Missouri troops; they were designated with the letters A through F. Morale among the Confederate troops in the Trans-Mississippi sank in May when news arrived of the surrender of the Confederate forces of Robert E. Lee and Joseph E. Johnston to the east. On May 26, the Confederates in the Trans-Mississippi surrendered as well. The 9th Missouri Sharpshooter Battalion journeyed to Shreveport, where the men were paroled on June 7. The battalion was sent back to Missouri on the steamboat Kentucky; the vessel sank in the Red River during the trip. At least 12 men of the battalion died in the wreck. Besides those who died when Kentucky sank, 17 were killed in action and a further 24 died of various diseases during the time the battalion existed. During the time the battalion existed, about 550 men served in it.

== Sources ==
- Bearss, Edwin C. (1991) [1986]. The Campaign for Vicksburg. Vol. III: Unvexed to the Sea. Dayton, Ohio: Morningside Bookshop. ISBN 0-89029-516-6.
- Christ, Mark K. (2010). Civil War Arkansas 1863: The Battle for a State. Norman, Oklahoma: University of Oklahoma Press. ISBN 978-0-8061-4433-7.
- Gurley, Bill (2013). "Mosby Monroe Parsons: Missouri's Forgotten Brigadier". In Schott, Thomas E.; Bergeron, Arthur W.; Hewitt, Lawrence L. (eds.). Confederate Generals in the Trans-Mississippi. Vol. 1. Knoxville, Tennessee: University of Tennessee Press. ISBN 978-1-57233-985-9.
- Gurley, Bill (2015). "Mosby Monroe Parsons: Major General, Murder Victim". In Schott, Thomas E.; Hewitt, Lawrence L. (eds.). Confederate Generals in the Trans-Mississippi. Vol. 2. Knoxville, Tennessee: University of Tennessee Press. ISBN 978-1-62190-124-2.
- Johnson, Ludwell H. (1998). "Military Strategy, Politics, and Economics: The Red River Campaign". In Kennedy, Frances H. (ed.). The Civil War Battlefield Guide (2nd ed.). Boston/New York: Houghton Mifflin. pp. 265–266. ISBN 978-0-395-74012-5.
- Kennedy, Frances H., ed. (1998). The Civil War Battlefield Guide (2nd ed.). Boston/New York: Houghton Mifflin. ISBN 978-0-395-74012-5.
- McGhee, James E. (2008). Guide to Missouri Confederate Regiments, 1861–1865. Fayetteville, Arkansas: University of Arkansas Press. ISBN 978-1-55728-870-7.
- Shea, William L. (2009). Fields of Blood: The Prairie Grove Campaign. Chapel Hill, North Carolina: University of North Carolina Press. ISBN 978-0-8078-3315-5.
