= 10th Missouri Infantry Regiment (Confederate) =

Infantry regiment of the Confederate States Army

10th Missouri Infantry Steen's Missouri Infantry Regiment Pickett's Missouri Infantry Regiment
- Active: 1862–1865
- Country: Confederate States
- Branch: Confederate States Army
- Type: Infantry
- Size: 650 (November 10, 1862); 236 (July 6, 1863)
- Engagements: American Civil War: Battle of Prairie Grove; Battle of Helena; Little Rock Campaign; Red River Campaign; Battle of Pleasant Hill; Camden Expedition; Battle of Jenkins' Ferry

The 10th Regiment Missouri Infantry was an infantry regiment that served in the Confederate States Army during the American Civil War. The regiment was organized on November 10, 1862, and was assigned to the brigade of Brigadier General Mosby M. Parsons. The regiment fought at the Battle of Prairie Grove, where both the regiment's colonel and lieutenant colonel were killed. The regiment fought at the Battle of Helena on July 4, 1863, where it suffered heavy casualties. Beginning in late 1863, the 12th Missouri Infantry Regiment was attached to the regiment; the men of the 12th Missouri Infantry were officially merged into the regiment in late 1864. The regiment fought at the battles of Pleasant Hill and Jenkins' Ferry in April. On June 8, 1865, the men of the regiment were paroled and sent back to Missouri.

== Organization ==
The 10th Missouri Infantry Regiment was mustered into the Confederate army on November 10, 1862, while the men of the regiment were stationed east of Fort Smith, Arkansas. To form the regiment, a cavalry battalion commanded by Alexander E. Steen was consolidated with a unit of recruits led by John M. Johnson and elements of the Missouri State Guard. After the mustering-in process was completed, there were 650 men in the regiment, although many were poorly armed. Steen was appointed as the regiment's first colonel, William C. Chappell was the regiment's first lieutenant colonel, and Alexander C. Pickett was the first major. As of the date of organization, the regiment's company structure was:

- Company A: Macon County, Marion County, Monroe County, Platte County, and Randolph County.
- Company B: Clark County, Clay County, Franklin County, Knox County, Pettis County, Platte County, Scotland County, and St. Louis.
- Company C: Douglas County, Texas County, and Wright County.
- Company D: Dent County and Phelps County.
- Company E: Maries County and Phelps County.
- Company F: Fulton County, Arkansas and Lawrence County, Missouri. (Note: Later transferred to the 38th Arkansas Infantry Regiment and replaced with a new Company F formed from the 12th Missouri Infantry Regiment.)
- Company G: Hickory County, Phelps County, and Pulaski County. (Note: Later consolidated with Company K at an unknown date and replaced with a new Company G formed from the 12th Missouri Infantry Regiment.)
- Company H: Gasconade County, Maries County, and Osage County.
- Company I: St. Louis County, Missouri and Jefferson County, Missouri.
- Company K: Maries County and Miller County.

== History ==
=== 1862 ===
After formation, the regiment was assigned to the brigade of Brigadier General Mosby M. Parsons. On December 7, 1862, the regiment was engaged at the Battle of Prairie Grove. Early in the action, Parsons' Brigade was positioned on the left of the Confederate main line, with the 10th Missouri Infantry on the right. Later in the battle, Parsons' Brigade attacked a Union position. The 10th Missouri Infantry engaged the 2nd Indiana Battery; the regiment suffered heavily from canister fire. During the attack, Steen was shot in the head and killed; Chappell was killed soon after. The brigade broke, and the fighting at Prairie Grove ended. At Prairie Grove, the regiment lost 31 men killed, 62 wounded, and 3 missing, for a total of 96; Pickett replaced Steen as commander of the regiment. The regiment then occupied quarters in Van Buren, Arkansas.

=== 1863 ===
In January 1863, the regiment was transferred to Little Rock, Arkansas, where it spent the rest of the winter. On May 3, the regiment was officially named by order of Major General Sterling Price; the regiment had been known by the name of its commander previously. Later in May, the regiment moved with the rest of Price's command to Jacksonport, Arkansas. Towards the end of June, Price then sent his men towards Helena, Arkansas, in order to attack a Union force stationed there. On July 4, during the Battle of Helena, the 10th Missouri Infantry and the rest of Parsons' Brigade attacked a position known as Graveyard Hill. Parsons' attack was successful, but other Confederate forces were unable to penetrate the Union lines. As a result, Union forces were able to concentrate against Parsons' Brigade, driving it from the field and capturing many of the Missourians. In five hours of fighting, the 10th Missouri Infantry lost 11 men killed, 41 wounded, and 237 captured, for a total of 289; only 236 men remained in the regiment on July 6.

After the retreat from Helena, the 10th Missouri Infantry manned defenses around Little Rock. However, Union Major General Frederick Steele's attacking column moved around the Confederate defenses, attacking Little Rock from the rear. The 10th Missouri Infantry saw no action at Little Rock and left the city on September 10, moving to Arkadelphia, Arkansas. On November 22, the 12th Missouri Infantry Regiment, which contained fewer than 200 men due to heavy losses, was reduced to two companies and attached to the 10th Missouri Infantry. To make room for the men from the 12th Missouri Infantry in the company structure, Company F of the 10th Missouri Infantry was sent to the 38th Arkansas Infantry Regiment, and Companies G and K were eventually combined. The regiment spent the winter stationed at various points in southern Arkansas. An election was held on December 2; Pickett was defeated in the election and was replaced as colonel by William M. Moore, former commander of Company A.

=== 1864–1865 ===
In late March 1864, the 10th Missouri Infantry was assigned to a brigade commanded by Colonel Simon P. Burns in a division commanded by Parsons. In early April, a Union army under command of Major General Nathaniel P. Banks began moving towards Shreveport, Louisiana, in the Red River Campaign. On April 9, Burns' Brigade joined the command of Major General Richard Taylor at Pleasant Hill, Louisiana. Later that day, the regiment participated in the Battle of Pleasant Hill. Parsons' division, which was on the right flank of the Confederate line, attacked the Union line. The attack was initially successful, driving in part of the Union line, but a Union counterattack defeated the Confederates. The Confederates retreated in some disarray. The Union force abandoned the field after the battle. At Pleasant Hill, the regiment lost 10 men killed and 25 wounded, for a total of 35.

The division then went on the offensive, marching north towards Camden, Arkansas, to attack a garrison of troops commanded by Major General Frederick Steele. Steele's force abandoned Camden before the Confederates could lay it under siege; the Confederates pursued Steele. On April 30, Confederate troops caught up with Steele at the Battle of Jenkins' Ferry. At Jenkins' Ferry, Burn's Brigade charged the Union line and encountered the 33rd Iowa Infantry Regiment and the 12th Kansas Infantry Regiment. Burns' Brigade was able to outflank the Iowa and Kansas regiments, who then fell back. However, Union reinforcements quickly arrived and repulsed the Confederate attack, driving Burns' Brigade back to the area where it had begun its attack. The battle had been fought in a rainstorm; many of the 10th Missouri Infantry's battlefield maneuvers were completed in knee-deep water. After the battle, the Union troops were able to escape across the Saline River by using pontoon bridges. The 10th Missouri Infantry had lost three men killed and eight wounded in the fighting; one of the slain was Lieutenant Colonel Simon Harris. On September 19, the remnant of the 12th Missouri Infantry that had been attached to the 10th Missouri Infantry was officially consolidated into the regiment.

The regiment spent the rest of 1864 and the beginning of 1865 encamped at various points in southern Arkansas and in the Shreveport area. On June 8, 1865, the survivors of the regiment were paroled while stationed at Shreveport. The steamboat E. H. Fairchild was used to ship the men back to Missouri. The regiment's flag was not surrendered; the men of the regiment tore it into pieces and distributed the pieces as souvenirs.

== See also ==
- List of Missouri Confederate Civil War units

== Sources ==
- Forsyth, Michael J. (2003). The Camden Expedition of 1864. Jefferson, North Carolina: McFarland & Company, Inc. ISBN 0-7864-1554-1.
- Johnson, Ludwell H. (1993). Red River Campaign: Politics and Cotton in the Civil War. Kent, Ohio: Kent State University Press. ISBN 0-87338-486-5.
- McGhee, James E. (2008). Guide to Missouri Confederate Regiments, 1861–1865. Fayetteville, Arkansas: University of Arkansas Press. ISBN 978-1-55728-870-7.
- Shea, William L. (2009). Fields of Blood: The Prairie Grove Campaign. Chapel Hill: University of North Carolina Press. ISBN 978-0-8078-3315-5.
