= 11th Missouri Infantry Regiment =

11th Missouri Infantry Regiment may refer to:

- 11th Missouri Infantry Regiment (Confederate)
- 11th Missouri Infantry Regiment (Union)
