= 10th Missouri Infantry Regiment =

10th Missouri Infantry Regiment may refer to:

- 10th Missouri Infantry Regiment (Confederate)
- 10th Missouri Infantry Regiment (Union)

== See also ==
- 10th Missouri Cavalry Regiment
