= 40th Iowa Infantry Regiment =

- Iowa state flag
- Active: November 15, 1862, to June 5, 1865
- Country: United States
- Allegiance: Union
- Branch: Infantry
- Engagements: Siege of Vicksburg; Little Rock Campaign; Red River Campaign; Battle of Jenkins' Ferry

The 40th Iowa Infantry Regiment was an infantry regiment that served in the Union Army during the American Civil War.

== Service ==
The 40th Iowa Infantry was organized at Iowa City, Iowa, on November 15, 1862.

The Regiment arrived at Cairo, 19 December, 1862, and To Columbus, Kentucky, and There Performed Garrison Duty until May 31st, When it Moved down the Mississippi River And Up the Yazoo, June 6th, It marched to Haines's Bluff, and Remained there until the Surrender of Vicksburg.

July 23rd, The Regiment took Transports to Helena, Arkansas, Went on Little Rock campaign, Bringing up, September 10th, At Little Rock, and on March 23rd, Took Part in Bank's Red River Expedition, taking part in numerous Engagements with the Confederates, and at Jenkins's Ferry, Where it was Engaged at. At August 24th, It moved by Rail to Brownsville, Where it took part in all the marches and maneuvers of the army until it was Mustered out at Fort Gibson at June 5th, 1865.

The regiment was mustered out on June 5, 1865.

== Total strength and casualties ==
A total of 1136 men served in the 40th Iowa at one time or another during its existence. It suffered 19 enlisted men who were killed in action or who died of their wounds and 2 officers and 184 enlisted men who died of disease, for a total of 205 fatalities.

== Commanders ==
- Colonel John A. Garrett

== See also ==
- List of Iowa Civil War Units
- Iowa in the American Civil War
