= Department of Arkansas (United States) =

The Department of the Arkansas was a territorial department of the United States Army during the American Civil War and Reconstruction.

== History ==
The Department of the Arkansas was created on January 6, 1864, to consist of Union occupied Arkansas, except Fort Smith. Fort Smith was merged into the Department of the Arkansas on April 17, 1864.

"By direction of the President of the United States, Major General F. Steele, U.S. Volunteers, is placed in command of the Department of Arkansas, which will consist of the State of Arkansas, except Fort Smith. The troops of Major-General Steele's command will constitute the 7th Army Corps, and will be subject to the Maj. Gen. U. S. Grant."

It was co-extensive with the reconstitution of 7th Army Corps. Commanders were Frederick Steele (January 6, 1864 to December 22, 1864) and Joseph J. Reynolds (December 22, 1864 to August 1, 1865).

== See also ==
- Army of Arkansas
