= VII Corps (Union army) =

Corps of the Union Army

Seventh Army Corps
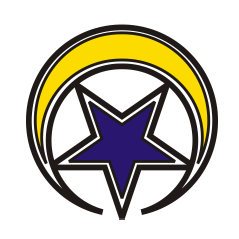
- Seventh Army Corps Badge
- Active: 1862–1863; 1864–1865
- Country: United States of America
- Branch: Union Army
- Type: Army corps
- Role: Headquarters
- Part of: Department of Virginia; Department of Arkansas
- Engagements: American Civil War

Insignia
- Headquarters flag

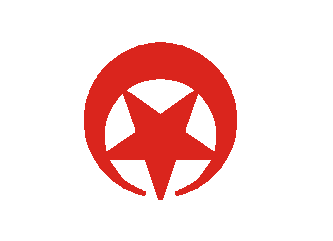
- 1st Division flag

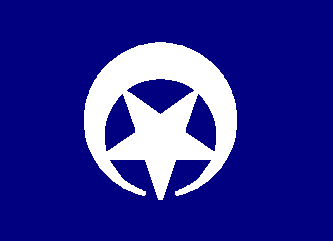
- 2nd Division flag

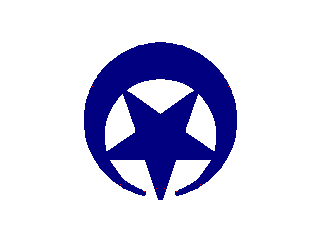
- 3rd Division flag

Two army corps of the Union Army were called Seventh Army Corps during the American Civil War.

== History ==
=== Department of Virginia ===
This corps was established July 22, 1862 from various Union troops stationed in southeastern Virginia. The corps' main combat action occurred in the spring of 1863, when it faced Confederate troops of James Longstreet's Corps in Suffolk, Virginia. Commanders were:

- John A. Dix (July 22, 1862 – July 16, 1863)
- Henry M. Naglee (July 16–20, 1863)
- George W. Getty (July 20 – August 1, 1863)

The corps was discontinued on August 1, 1863, and its troops were transferred to the Eighteenth Army Corps.

=== Department of Arkansas ===
After the original corps was deactivated in the summer of 1863, a second Seventh Army Corps was formed from troops in the Department of Arkansas. Most of its active service occurred during Steele's Camden Expedition. Commanders were:

- Frederick Steele (January 6, 1864 – December 22, 1864)
- Joseph J. Reynolds (December 22, 1864 – August 1, 1865)
