= Battle of Jenkins' Ferry =

1864 battle of the American Civil War

- Part of the American Civil War
Date	April 30, 1864 (162 years ago)
Location	Hot Spring and Saline counties (present-day Grant County), Arkansas 34°12′45″N 92°32′51″W
Result	Union victory

Belligerents
United States (Union)	Confederate States

Commanders and leaders
(United States) Frederick Steele	(Confederate States of America) E. Kirby Smith: Sterling Price

Units involved
Department of Arkansas; 7th Army Corps	Army of Arkansas

Strength
12,000	10,000

Casualties and losses
700	1,000
- Location in Arkansas

The Battle of Jenkins' Ferry, also known as the Engagement at Jenkins' Ferry, was fought on April 30, 1864, in Hot Spring and Saline counties (present-day Grant County), Arkansas, during the American Civil War. Ending in a tactical Union victory, the Confederacy saw it as a strategic success as they prevented Frederick Steele from holding southwest Arkansas. Due to the chaotic nature of the battle, casualty figures vary.

Jenkins' Ferry was the decisive engagement of Steele's Camden Expedition (a part of the Red River Campaign) and E. Kirby Smith's last. As a result of the battle, Federal forces could complete a retreat from a precarious position at Camden to their defenses at Little Rock.

The battlefield has largely been preserved as a unit within the Arkansas State Park System.

== Background ==
In March 1864, the United States Army in Louisiana under the command of Major-General Nathaniel Banks and the United States Navy operating on the Mississippi River under the command of Admiral David Porter launched the Red River Campaign. The campaign's immediate objective was the capture of Shreveport, Louisiana, which was the headquarters of General E. Kirby Smith, commander of the Confederate Trans-Mississippi Department. Shreveport also was the temporary capital of Louisiana, a major supply depot and a gateway to Texas. An incidental objective of the campaign was to purchase cotton, which was in short supply in the northern States, and possibly win the loyalty of planters along the river for the United States. It was thought this action might expand Reconstruction in Louisiana. (Note: In the event, the naval force and accompanying soldiers in particular alienated the local population by simply confiscating or destroying cotton.) Henry Halleck, Major-General and General-in-Chief of the Armies of the United States, who devised the plan, also wanted to open the road to the occupation of Texas by U.S. forces and to discourage French incursions from Mexico. France had invaded and occupied Mexico in June 1863, setting up a government under their puppet "emperor," Maximilian.

Since President Lincoln had approved the Red River Campaign plan before promoting Ulysses Grant to lieutenant general and appointing him General-in-Chief, Grant felt he could not stop the campaign. Grant did try to hurry its execution because he would have preferred to use a 10,000-man force which was diverted to the campaign to reinforce Sherman in his March to the Sea through Georgia. Grant also would have liked to have pinned down more Confederate troops in Alabama with an attack on the Confederate stronghold at Mobile.

General Banks had a force of at least 20,000 men available near New Orleans for the campaign. He was to be joined by 10,000 men of Sherman's army from Vicksburg, Mississippi, under the command of Brigadier-General Andrew Smith. Smith's force accompanied Porter's flotilla up the Red River. Initially, they were successful in capturing Fort DeRussy to open passage up the Red River. Major-General Frederick Steele commanding approximately 14,000 men also was supposed to move his forces in support of Banks against Shreveport from their bases to the north at Little Rock, Fort Smith, and Pine Bluff, Arkansas.

== Prelude ==
=== To Camden ===
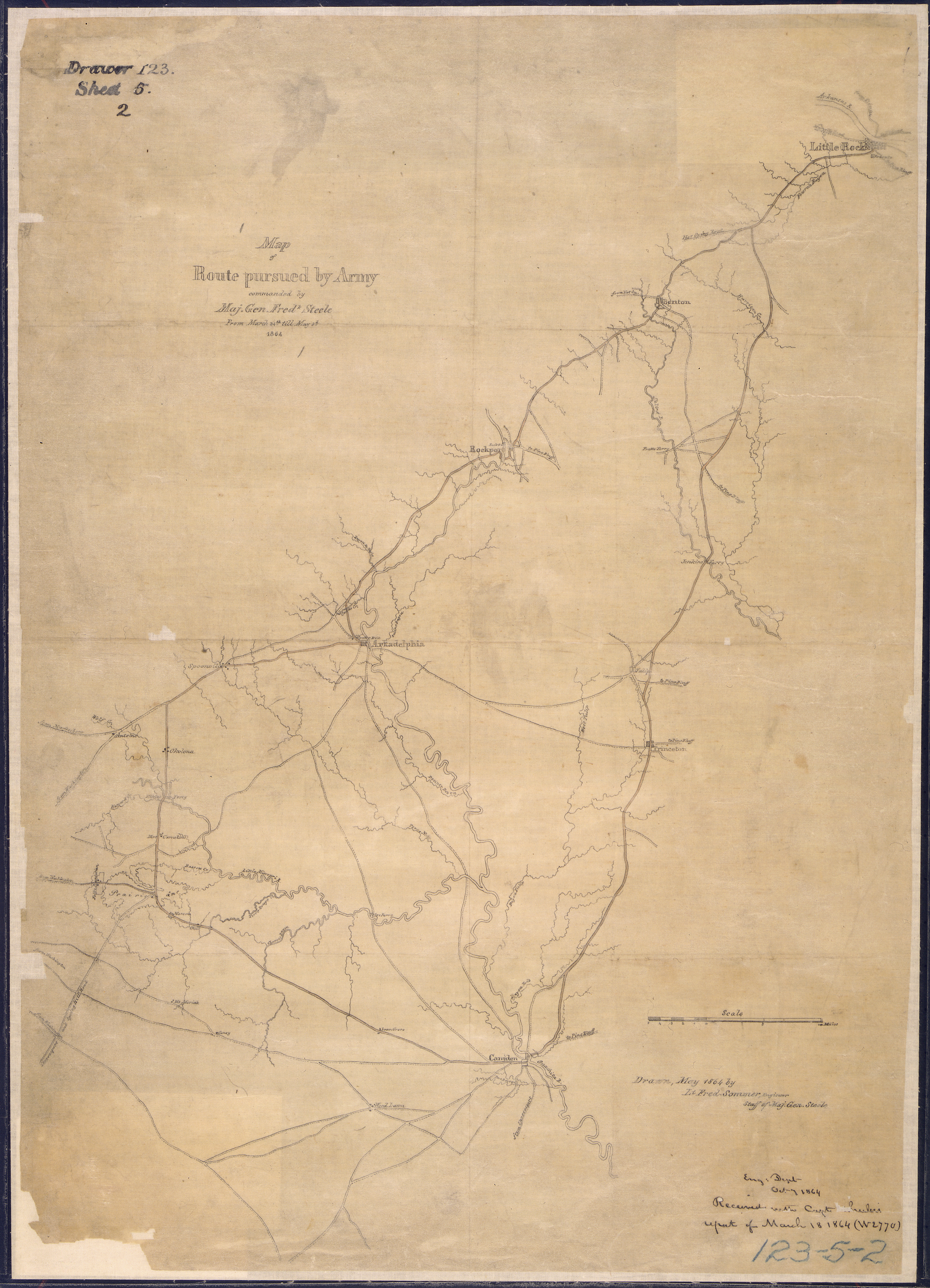
Map of the Camden Expedition, May 1864.

Steele's part in the campaign became known as the Camden Expedition. Steele later said its objective was to reach and occupy Camden, Arkansas, and to draw Confederate cavalry away from Shreveport in support of Banks's effort to take that city. Nonetheless, Banks obviously planned for Steele to join him in the attempt to take Shreveport, not just to occupy Camden temporarily. Even Grant sent a telegram to Steele which told Steele that a demonstration alone was insufficient support of Banks. After Banks's forces were repulsed in their march toward Shreveport at the Battle of Mansfield, Louisiana, by outnumbered forces led by Confederate Lieutenant-General Richard Taylor, Banks paused his retreat at Alexandria, Louisiana. Banks still thought he could renew the campaign and communicated to Steele his desire for Steele's reinforcements to join his forces in another attempt to take Shreveport.

Steele, with 8,000 men, first marched southwest from Little Rock to Arkadelphia, Arkansas. Steele planned to meet a federal column of 4,000 men from Fort Smith, led by Brigadier-General John Thayer, at Arkadelphia. A Federal cavalry force of about 2,000 men from Pine Bluff, Arkansas, was supposed to keep watch on the Confederate garrison at Camden, divert attention from Steele's movement, and eventually to join up with Steele. Even though Steele was three weeks behind schedule, he did not find Thayer at Arkadelphia when his forces arrived there on March 29, 1864. Steele's men had marched for the last three days in the rain on already reduced rations. The people of the poor country along the route of the march were destitute and there was little food or forage to be had. After waiting until April 1, 1864, with his supplies being further depleted and no word from Thayer, Steele moved southwest toward Washington, Arkansas, the temporary capital of Confederate Arkansas. He eventually united with Thayer near Elkins' Ferry on the Little Missouri River on April 9, 1864. Thayer brought few supplies, however, and the combined force then became short of supplies.

Steele succeeded in aiding Banks only to the extent of keeping the five Confederate cavalry brigades in the region from joining the forces opposing Banks. Two Confederate infantry divisions from Arkansas and Missouri under the overall command of Major-General Sterling Price, the commander of Confederate forces in Arkansas, were sent from the Camden area to support the forces opposing Banks. Under the command of Brigadier-General John Marmaduke and the overall command of Price, who stayed in Arkansas, three of the five Confederate cavalry brigades left in Arkansas harassed Steele's force as it moved from Arkadelphia. They could not stop its slow progress. The opposing forces fought a small battle at Elkins' Ferry on the Little Missouri River on April 3, 1864, where Steele's forces stymied Marmaduke's attempt to prevent them from crossing the Little Missouri River. They fought another small battle at Prairie D'Ane, Arkansas, on April 10, 1864. On April 12, Steele feinted toward Washington, where Price had moved to resist Steele's presumed objective to take the town. Steele then sidestepped the Confederates with a move to Camden, which was out of the way for a march to Shreveport. After brushing aside Marmaduke's cavalry 14 miles (23 km) from Camden, Steele's force occupied Camden on April 15, 1864. Price had earlier evacuated that fortified town in order to defend the temporary Confederate state capital at Washington, Arkansas.

=== Camden, Poison Spring, and Marks' Mill ===
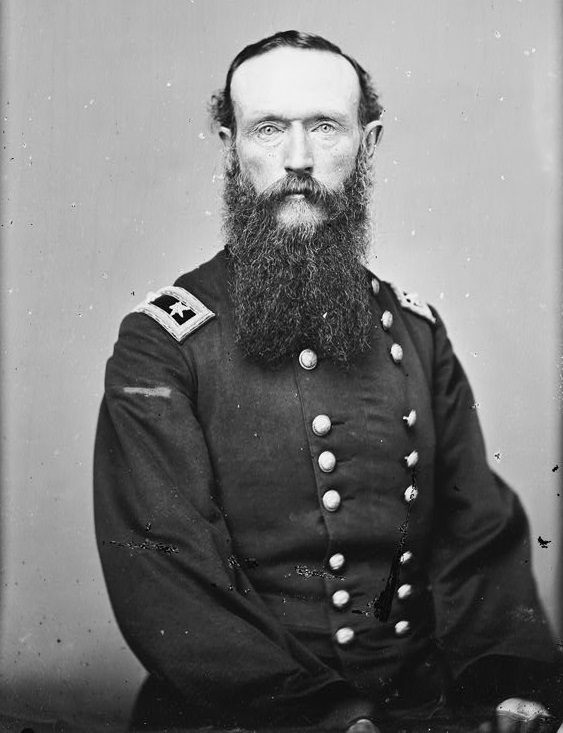
Major-General Frederick Steele, commander of the Department of Arkansas and 7th Army Corps

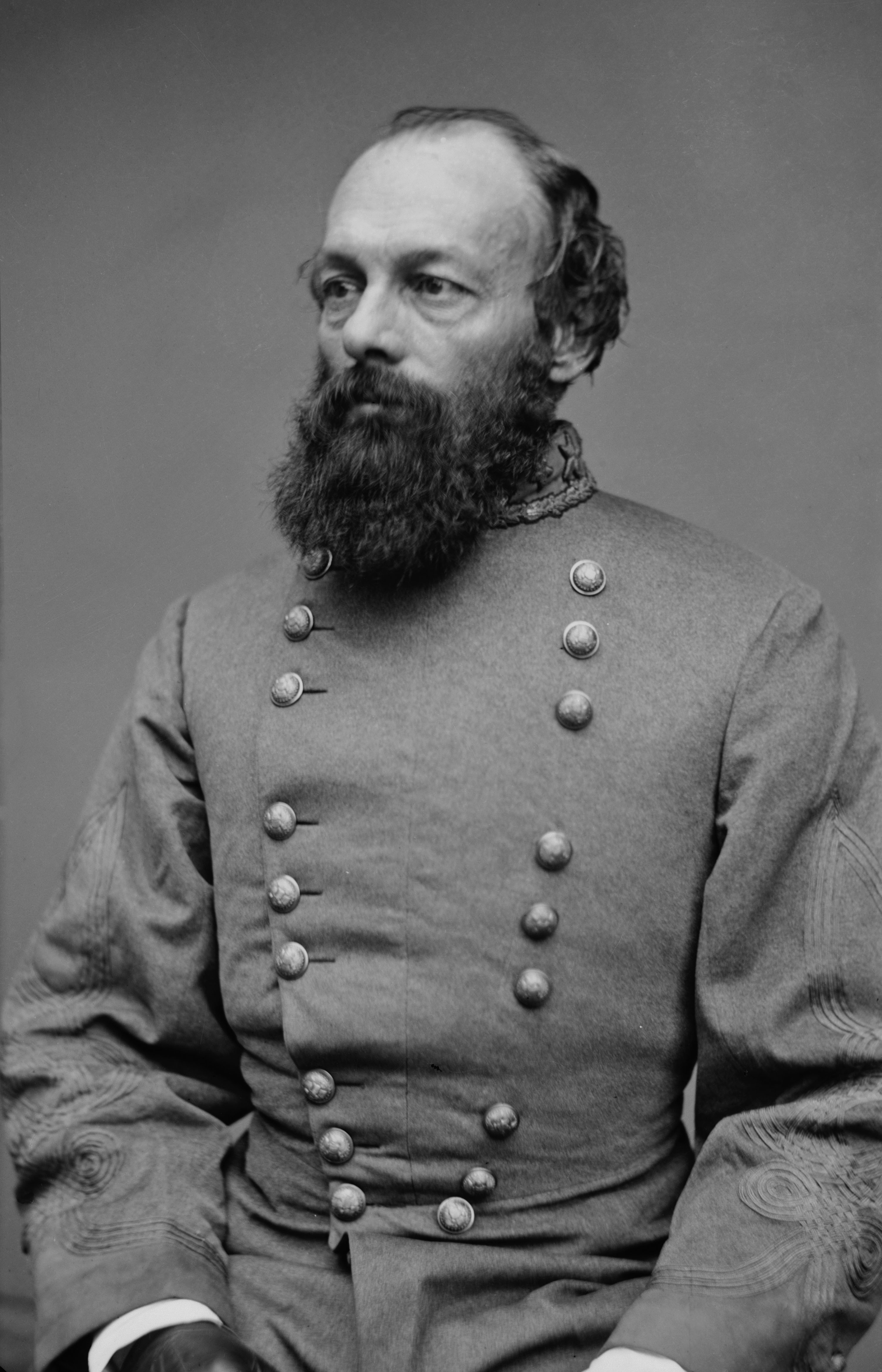
General E. Kirby Smith's strategy was to isolate Banks' and Steele's armies and annihilate each one separately.

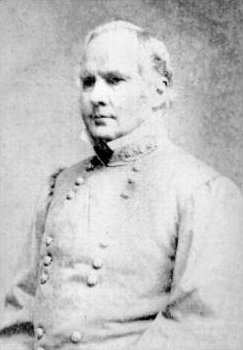
Led by Major-General Sterling Price, the Confederates fought a strong defensive campaign and stopped the Union advance at Camden, Arkansas.

Price, who had been joined by two Texas cavalry brigades under Brigadier-General Samuel Maxey, appeared at Camden with his cavalry soon after Steele's occupation of the town. Price besieged the entrenched Steele with the seven cavalry brigades, even though Steele's federal force still outnumbered Price's Confederate force.

Steele had hoped to be resupplied from depots at Little Rock and Pine Bluff and to collect provisions from the countryside. He was denied significant resupply when Confederate cavalry forces of 1,700 troopers under Brigadier-General Marmaduke and 1,600 additional troopers under Brigadier-General Maxey overwhelmed a federal foraging expedition under the command of Colonel James M. Williams, which would have been successful had it been able to return to Camden. The Confederates captured 170 wagons and teams from a 198-wagon supply train and destroyed the other wagons at the battle of Poison Spring, Arkansas. One source stated that the Confederates killed or captured "most" of the Federal escort of 1,170 infantry and cavalry and four artillery pieces during the battle on April 18, 1864. Another source states that the U.S. forces lost 301 men, mostly killed or missing. (Note: Eicher (2001, p. 653) says U.S. casualties at Poison Spring were 204 killed and missing and 97 wounded, with 117 of the dead being African-Americans. He does not give a separate number of captured U.S. soldiers. He states that Confederate losses totaled 114.) The Confederates killed some colored soldiers from the escort in this battle as they tried to surrender, according to reports from the field. About the time the remnants of the federal force who were not killed or captured at Poison Spring stumbled back into Camden, Steele learned that General Banks had turned back in his drive toward Shreveport after being defeated at the Battle of Mansfield, Louisiana (also known as Pleasant Grove or Sabine Cross Roads), about 40 miles (64 km) from Shreveport, on April 8, 1864.

Banks had won a tactical victory and inflicted more casualties (1,626) than his forces sustained (1,369) at the Battle of Pleasant Hill the day after the battle of Mansfield. His force also outnumbered the Confederate force, but Banks thought otherwise, so he continued his retreat toward Alexandria. Meanwhile, Admiral Porter had to retreat down the Red River and back toward the Mississippi River while under near-constant Confederate fire from the river banks. Porter had to return not only because of Banks's retreat but because his flotilla was in danger of being stranded by uncommonly low water levels in the Red River. Although the boats were freed from the Red River by May 13 through skillful engineering and damming of the river, Banks had to wait at Alexandria when Porter's boats were bottled up to protect the fleet from Confederate attack from the shore. Only after the boats were safely down the river could Banks move in any direction.

On April 23, 1864, when Steele received the dispatch from Banks asking that he join Banks so they could move again on Shreveport, Steele responded that he was in no position to join Banks. He also noted that he now faced not only Confederate cavalry but Price's returned infantry and additional infantry under Kirby Smith who had joined Price with some of the infantry which had been with Taylor at the battle of Pleasant Hill. Brigadier-General Thomas Churchill's Arkansas division and Brigadier-General Mosby Parsons's Missouri division had returned to Price's command. They were followed by Major-General John Walker's larger Texas division with Kirby Smith. Kirby Smith had decided that Steele was a bigger threat and a bigger prize, than Banks when Banks continued to retreat after the battle of Pleasant Hill on April 9, 1864. Kirby Smith thought he could destroy Steele's force and perhaps still turn back and trap Banks later. Taylor vehemently disagreed with this decision and wanted to attack Banks immediately. Nonetheless, Taylor could not convince Kirby Smith to change his plan. As Banks appeared to be waiting for the naval force at Alexandria, Louisiana, Kirby Smith became even more certain that his decision was correct and he had time to execute it.

On April 25, 1864, in an action called the Battle of Marks' Mills, two Confederate cavalry brigades under the overall command of Brigadier-General James Fagan, operating under Price, captured a Federal wagon train of between 211 and 240 wagons and 1,300 men of the escort which Steele had sent to seek supplies from the federal depot at Pine Bluff. Only about 150 of the 1,400 to 1,700 U.S. soldiers escaped after a five–hour fight. (Note: Eicher (2001, p. 654) states that numerous prisoners were captured but also says U.S. losses were 100 killed, 250 wounded, 100 captured. Confederate losses were 41 killed, 108 wounded, 144 missing.) Fagan had about 300 casualties in the engagement. Reports showed his men killed wounded African-American soldiers at the end of the battle. The Confederates, in turn, would pay for this at the battle of Jenkins' Ferry.

=== Retreat from Camden ===
Steele was now desperately short of supplies, outnumbered, and in danger of being surrounded at Camden. After his senior officers agreed with him that he had no other reasonable choice, Steele ordered a night withdrawal toward Little Rock on April 26 and the early morning of April 27, 1864. The Confederates did not detect Steele's movement until later in the day. Steele's forces used a pontoon bridge which they had carried on the campaign to cross the Ouachita River. Steele thus gained a head start on the Confederates, who pursued the federal force as soon as they realized that Steele had withdrawn from Camden. First, the Confederates had to get across the swollen and bridgeless Ouachita River on the morning of April 28 by constructing a raft bridge. This delay allowed Steele to get a further head start, although rain soon slowed him down. The Confederates struggled through the rain, as well, but they did not have as many wagons or as much equipment to slow down their pursuit.

Meanwhile, on April 28, Price sent Samuel Maxey's division of two cavalry brigades back to Oklahoma and Texas to attend to reported threats to that territory by another federal force. Brigadier-General Fagan, who had commanded the victorious Confederate forces at Marks Mill, took off on independent operations but did not fulfill his orders, which permitted this movement along with some stated objectives. He failed in his first objective to destroy the Federal supply depot at Pine Bluff, probably because he could not cross the swollen Saline River, a tributary of the Ouachita River. Fagan also failed to occupy a position across Steele's supply and communication lines between Camden and Little Rock, as Price had ordered. Fagan probably was looking for food and forage for his own force. Fagan was not in immediate communication with Price and not in a position to know about Steele's recent movements out of Camden, but Price realized on April 29 that Fagan was not blocking the federal retreat. Fagan and his 3,000 troopers would arrive at Jenkins' Ferry on April 30, 1864, which was too late to take part in the battle.

General Steele moved due north out of Camden by way of Princeton, Arkansas. His force was harassed by Confederate cavalry as General Marmaduke's men caught up to the federal column on their approach to the Saline River. When Steele's forces reached Jenkins' Ferry on the swollen river, they had to stop to construct their pontoon bridge to get across. The remaining 10,000 Confederates under Kirby Smith and Price then caught up to Steele, who also had about 10,000 men remaining from his original forces. The Confederates brought on a battle by attacking the Federal rearguard in the early morning of April 30, 1864. Steele's cavalry had been able to cross the Saline River overnight on April 29. Now Steele had to fight off Kirby Smith's army before his infantry forces could finish their efforts to get their wagons, artillery, and remaining troops over their pontoon bridge river crossing.

== Battle ==
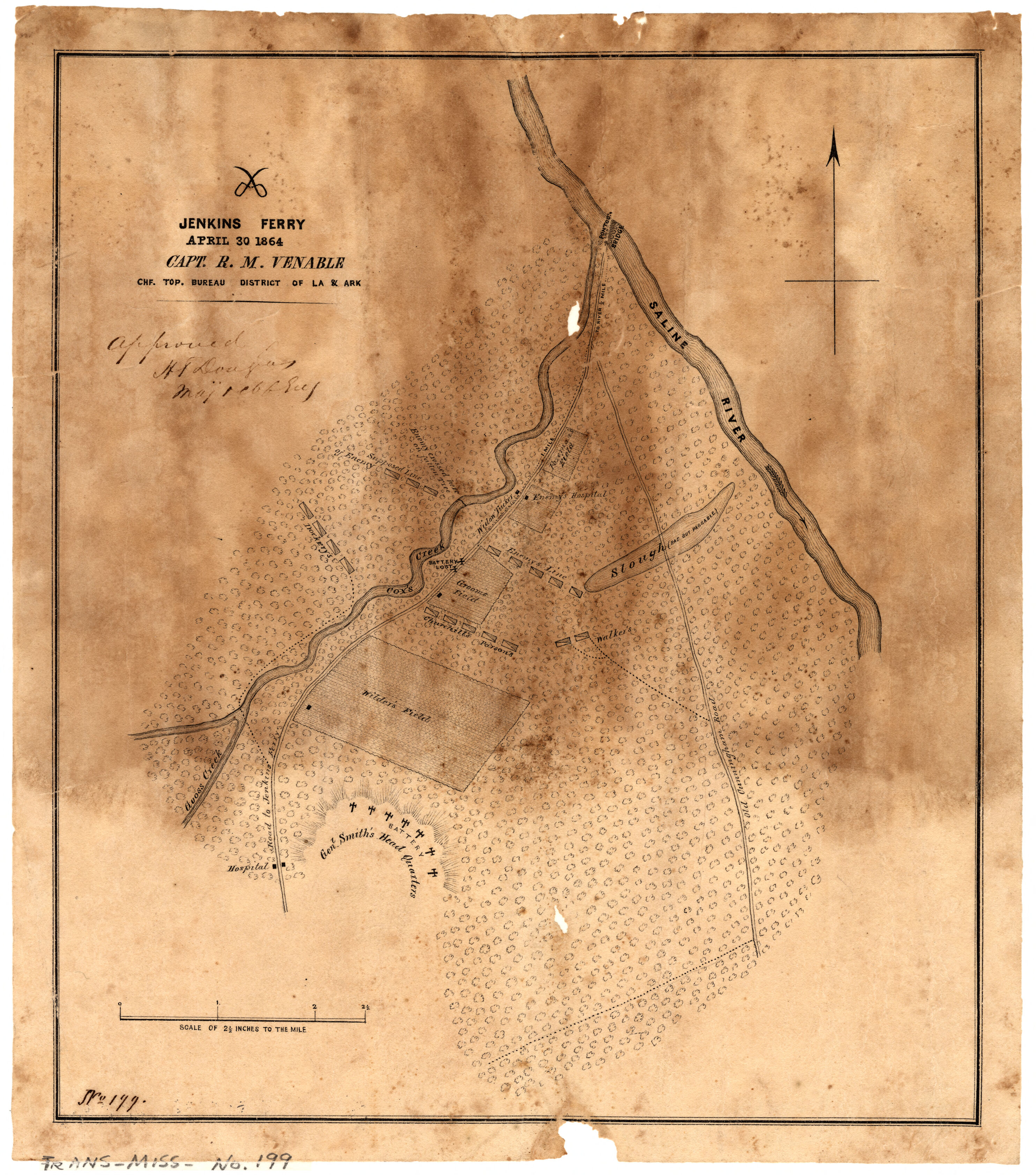
Map of the Battle of Jenkins' Ferry, c. 1864.

Major-General Steele's Federal forces reached Jenkins' Ferry, Arkansas, on the Saline River at 2:00 p.m. on April 29, 1864, in their retreat from Camden, Arkansas, to their base at Little Rock. They found that the river was swollen by heavy rain. The rain continued in torrents on April 29, and the riverbank and approaches became a quagmire of mud and standing water. The tired and famished Federal troops could not construct their pontoon bridge and get their wagons and artillery out of the mud and over the river during the night, although the Federal cavalry did get across. Since the Federal commanders realized that Kirby Smith's Confederate forces were rushing to catch up to them, a Federal rearguard built breastworks and took a formidable defensive position to oppose the Confederates when they arrived in force on the morning of April 30. With Steele continuing to supervise the river crossing, Brigadier-General Friedrich Salomon should have commanded the rearguard action against the pursuing Confederates, but he left the task to Brigadier-General Samuel Rice and 4,000 Federal infantrymen.

Before dawn on April 30, 1864, Marmaduke's Confederate cavalry troopers arrived near Jenkins' Ferry, dismounted and skirmished with Steele's rear guard infantry force about 2 miles (3.2 km) from the Saline River crossing. Rice had placed the Federal forces behind breastworks, abatis and rifle pits. Rice's lines were protected by Cox Creek, sometimes shown as Toxie Creek, on the right. While some accounts have stated that an impassable cane swamp bordered the Federal position on one side and thick, rain-drenched timber on the other, other sources state that the left flank was vulnerable and only after failed Confederate efforts to turn his left flank did Rice extend the left end of his line until it rested on a steep wooded slope. The difficult approach to the Federal position was only about four hundred yards wide and would allow at most only 4,000 Confederate infantry to attack at one time. In the event, the Confederates attacked in an even more piecemeal manner.

Price first committed the infantry under Brigadier-General Thomas Churchill and then the infantry under Brigadier-General Mosby Parsons to the battle as soon as they arrived on the field. In turn, they each made little headway because they had no cover for an attack, and the approach to the Federal position was ankle to knee-deep in mud and pools of water. These Confederate divisions were sent into the attack piecemeal, brigade by brigade, not in a more concentrated effort.

Gunpowder smoke added to a blanket of fog soon after the battle began. This smoke and fog made it nearly impossible for the opposing forces to see each other except by crouching down low. This served to help the defenders more since they were mainly lying behind their works and not attempting to get to them through the mud as the Confederate attackers were attempting to do. They also could simply fire into a narrow area where the Confederates had to attack and achieve effective results. The mud and standing water prevented cavalry and artillery from participating much in the battle. In fact, the Confederates lost three artillery pieces to a charge by the 2nd Kansas Colored and the 29th Iowa infantry regiments from their fortified positions.

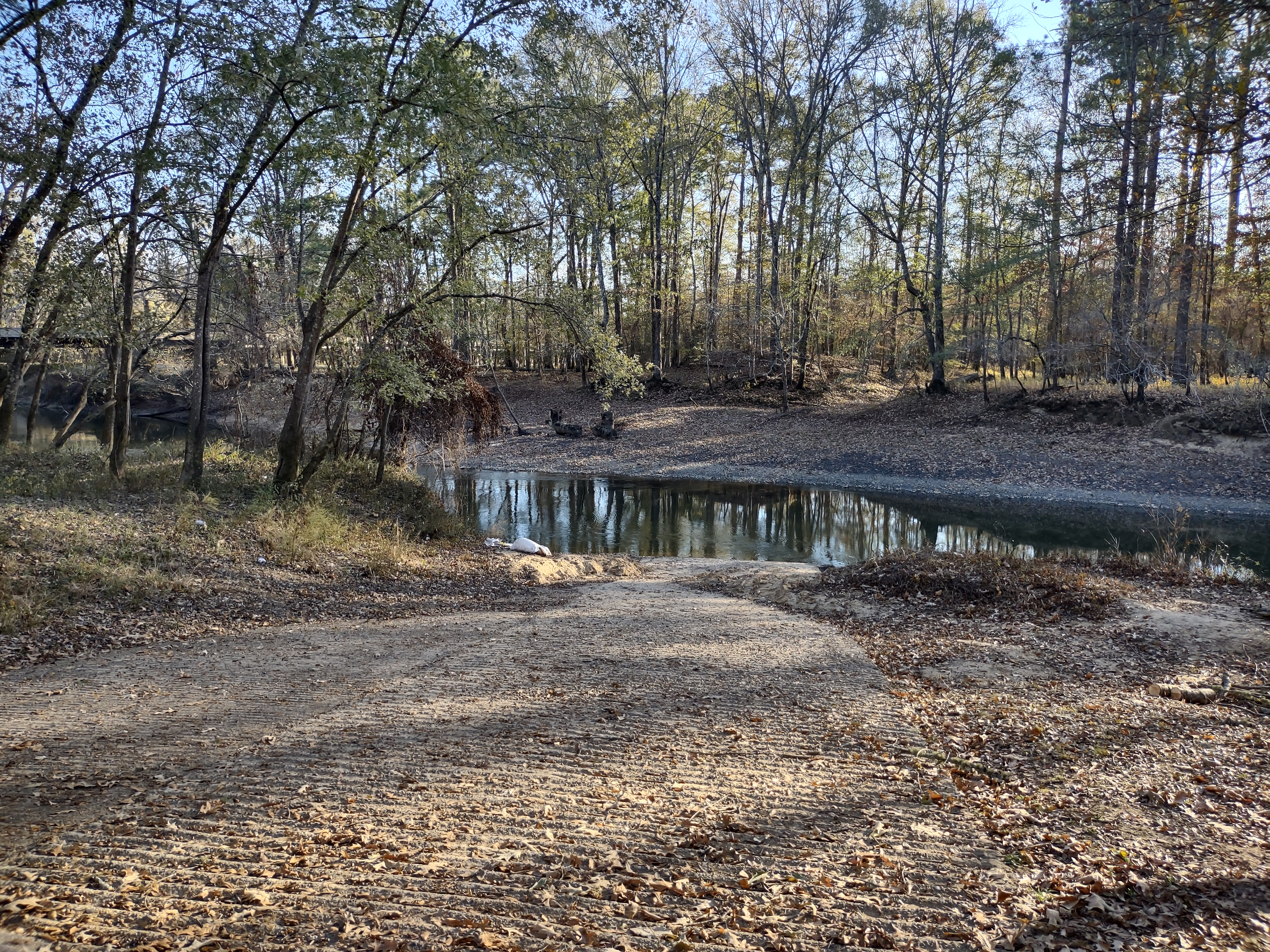
A view of the battlefield from the old ferry site at Jenkins' Ferry Battleground State Park in 2022.

After Price's forces under Brigadier-Generals Churchill and Parsons had made little progress, Kirby Smith came up with the large Texas infantry division under Major-General John Walker. Walker carried on the attack in the same manner as the previous divisions had done, brigade by brigade. All three Confederate brigade commanders under Walker were wounded in these attacks. Two of them, Brigadier-General William Scurry and Colonel Horace Randal were mortally wounded. U.S. Brigadier-General Samuel Rice also was mortally wounded in the final Confederate assault at Jenkins' Ferry. After taking about 1,000 casualties in their repeated attacks against the well-fortified Federal troops, while inflicting only about 700 casualties on the defenders, including the capture of stragglers, the Confederates gave up the piecemeal attacks on the Federal position. Before leaving the field, some soldiers of the 2nd Kansas Colored regiment shot and cut the throats of Confederate wounded near Rice's line in retaliation for the shooting of colored soldiers who were trying to surrender at Poison Spring and the killing of wounded colored troops at Marks' Mill. The officers of the 2nd Kansas Colored had, after Poison Spring, sworn that "the regiment would take no prisoners as long as the Rebels continued to murder our men".

By about 3:00 p.m. on April 30, 1864, the Federal forces finally crossed the Saline River with all their remaining men and the artillery pieces and equipment and supply wagons which were not irretrievably stuck in the mud, which they burned. Steele's forces were compelled to abandon many more wagons in the swamp north of the Saline River. The Confederates did not renew the attack as Steele's men crossed the pontoon bridge on the afternoon of April 30. Not only were the Confederates exhausted from the morning's battle, but the Federal forces had set up artillery and infantry on the opposite side of the river to protect the remaining Federal soldiers as they crossed the bridge. After crossing the Saline River, Steele's forces cut and burned the pontoon bridge, which they would not need for the remainder of their march. With no way to get across the river, the Confederates could not follow them. By not trapping Steele's force at Camden or cutting them off before they reached the Saline River, the Confederates under Kirby Smith lost a good chance to destroy Steele's army, which was the major portion of Federal forces in Arkansas. After crossing the river and three days' further march, Steele's forces regrouped within the fortifications of Little Rock.

== Aftermath ==
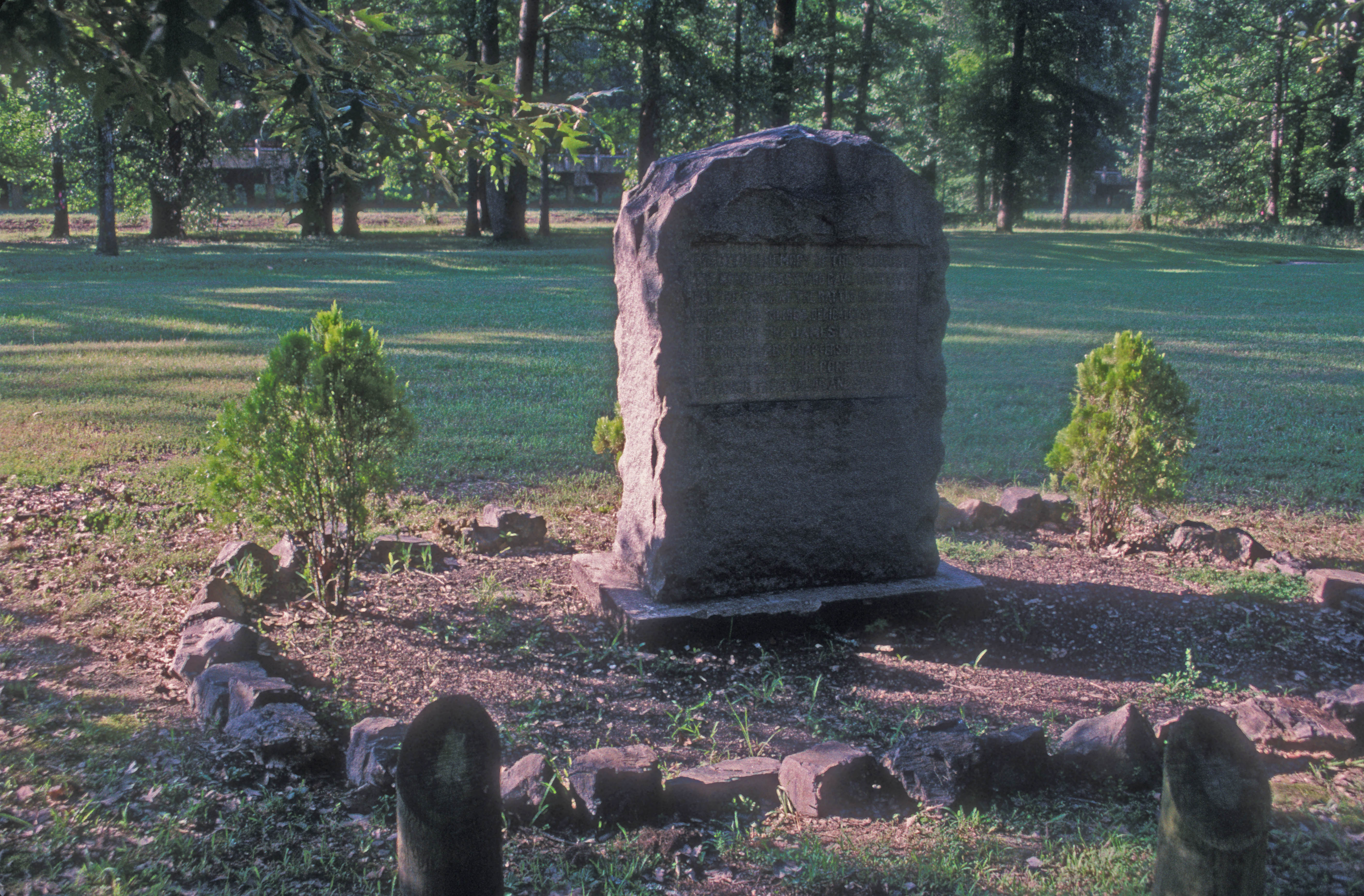
The Jenkins' Ferry War Memorial commemorates the soldiers of the Confederacy killed at the Battle of Jenkins' Ferry on April 30, 1864.

Considering the numbers engaged and percentage of casualties, the Jenkins' Ferry battle was one of the Civil War's bloodiest battles. Both armies paid dearly for the engagement. The Confederates officially reported 86 men killed, 356 wounded, and one missing, for a total of 443 casualties. The numbers would doubtless have been much higher, perhaps 800 to 1,000, if Walker's Texas division's losses were known. Walker filed no report on the battle. Officially reported but incomplete Federal casualties were 63 killed, 413 wounded, and 45 missings, a total of 521 casualties. (Note: Eicher (2001, p. 654) gives lower numbers and a more even distribution of casualties: U.S. 64 killed, 378 wounded, 86 missing; C.S. 86 killed 356 wounded, 1 missing, without mentioning the incomplete reports.) The U.S. total casualty figure was incomplete because Brigadier-General John Thayer filed no report. As noted above, in view of the incomplete or missing casualty reports, historians Shelby Foote and Gregory J. W. Urwin in the Heidlers' Encyclopedia of the American Civil War used 1,000 and 700 as the best estimate of total Confederate and Federal casualty figures, respectively, for this battle.

The Battle of Jenkins' Ferry may be counted as a Federal victory, at least tactically. Not only did the Confederates sustain more casualties, but Steele's Federal troops successfully held back the attacking Confederates. This allowed the Federal forces time and space to move most of their remaining wagons, artillery, equipment, cavalry, and infantry across the Saline River and escape back to Little Rock's safety. However, Steele's victory was hollow from a strategic viewpoint. Kirby Smith's forces held the battlefield, prevented Steele from joining with or further assisting Banks, and forced Steele's continued retreat back to Little Rock. In the campaign overall, Steele had lost 3,000 men to Smith's loss of 2,000. Many of Kirby Smith's men were lightly wounded. Steele had lost 10 artillery pieces to balance with three captured. He also lost 635 wagons, 2,500 mules, enough horses to mount a cavalry brigade and a long list of captured material, including ammunition, food and medical supplies. (Note: McPherson 2005, p. 150 gives slightly different overall casualty figures, stating that Steele had lost almost 2,500 soldiers while the Confederates lost about half that many.) The Federal force lost General Rice while the Confederate force lost General Scurry and Colonel Randal.

Kirby Smith's last hope to destroy Steele's army outside of his well-fortified base at Little Rock was dashed as a result of the mismanaged, disjointed, and piecemeal attacks at Jenkins' Ferry. However, while the Federal position and weather conditions limited Confederate options, a more concentrated effort appears to have been possible. The Confederates also failed to concentrate on the more vulnerable Federal left flank at the outset, choosing instead to pursue frontal assaults across Kelly's field, where the Southern lines of infantry were devastated by Federal fire. Assuming Rice had left this weak spot in, or just beyond, his defenses, the Confederates' early missed opportunity to attack in this area with concentrated force allowed Rice to see the possible vulnerability in his position and to extend and protect the left flank of the Federal line. After the Federal left flank was closed off, any opportunity for a successful Confederate attack at that point and any realistic chance Kirby Smith and Price might have had to trap most of Steele's force was gone.

After his situation had become hopeless at Camden, Steele gave up all thoughts of uniting with Banks on the Red River in a further campaign to take Shreveport and realized that he had to save his army. The battle of Jenkins' Ferry showed that Steele's force indeed was in danger while it was at Camden and southwest of the Saline River. Steele's decision to retreat to Little Rock, therefore, was a good one. Banks, in turn had to give up any hope of renewing his campaign against Shreveport. His major problems in renewing the campaign actually did not include an insufficient number of men, however, because he was reinforced in late April by forces under Major-General John McClernand. Banks had logistical problems and would not have gunboat transport and support because of Porter's inability to operate in the shallow water of the Red River during that spring and summer. In fact, Banks had to protect Porter's fleet at Alexandria, Louisiana, until it could be freed from the Red River on May 13 before he could move in any direction. (Note: Foote states that Banks and his forces left Alexandria on May 13, the day after Porter was able to get past the rapids near Alexandria, which allowed Porter's flotilla to make it back to the Mississippi River.)

Despite some Confederate disappointment in not destroying, through casualties or capture, most of the U.S. forces engaged in the Red River Campaign, the Confederates had a considerable tactical victory. The Federals lost over 8,000 men in the Red River Campaign, including the Camden Expedition, and returned to their starting points at the end of it. The Confederates lost about 6,500. The Confederates captured 57 artillery pieces, about a thousand wagons, most of them loaded, and 3,500 horses and mules. Sophronia Smith Hunt, who disguised herself as a soldier, lost her first soldier husband there.

As Shelby Foote noted, the Confederates also gained a strategic victory in the Red River Campaign. They were able to delay the return of Brigadier-General Andrew Smith's 10,000–man force to Major-General Sherman's army for use in the Atlanta campaign. Also, about 20,000 Confederate soldiers from Alabama were able to reinforce General Joe Johnston in his defense against Sherman. Otherwise, these forces might have been engaged in Alabama had Banks attacked Mobile, Alabama, as Lieutenant-General Grant would have preferred, rather than attempt to take Shreveport under Halleck's plan. (Note: Shelby Foote stated, in fairness to Banks, that even Banks would have preferred to move against Mobile rather than against Shreveport.) The United States Army tied up significant forces in the Red River Campaign and lost significant numbers of artillery pieces, wagons, mules and supplies that could have been used in the more decisive campaigns further east. However, Kirby Smith could not get his forces back to Alexandria in time for a further attempt to capture or destroy Banks's force. The disruption and retreat of Federal forces in Arkansas also cleared the way for Price's 1864 invasion of Missouri. Ultimately that campaign provided no long-term benefit to the Confederates, who were driven out of Missouri again after the Battle of Westport and the consequent offensive by U.S. cavalry under Major-General Alfred Pleasonton, which defeated the Confederates in four battles in five days following the battle of Westport.

== Battlefield preservation ==
The battlefield, preserved as Jenkins' Ferry Battleground State Park, is one of the Camden Expedition Sites that together were declared a National Historic Landmark in 1994. (Note: "In the spring of 1864, three Civil War battles took place in south-central Arkansas that were part of the United States Army's "Red River Campaign." Arkansas's three state historic parks that commemorate these battles—Poison Spring, Marks' Mills and Jenkins' Ferry—are part of the Red River Campaign National Historic Landmark." Wikimedia.org shows the location as: Coordinates: 34°11'48"N 92°33'55"W)

== In popular culture ==
The battle is briefly depicted and mentioned by fictional soldiers Private Harold Green of the 116th United States Colored Infantry Regiment and Corporal Ira Clark of the 5th Massachusetts (Colored) Cavalry Regiment who speak with President Abraham Lincoln (played by Daniel Day-Lewis), in the opening scene of the 2012 Steven Spielberg film Lincoln.

== See also ==
- List of American Civil War battles
- Troop engagements of the American Civil War, 1864
