= Mosby Monroe Parsons =

American politician (1822–1865)

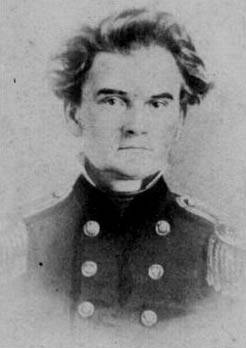
- Parsons in uniform, c. 1861
- Born: May 21, 1822; Charlottesville, Virginia, U.S.
- Disappeared: August 15, 1865 (aged 43); Near China, Nuevo León, Mexico
- Status: Declared dead in absentia September 21, 1865 (aged 43)
- Education: St. Charles College
- Occupations: Military officer, lawyer, politician
- Spouse: Mary Wells (m. 1850)
- Military service
- Allegiance: United States; Missouri (Confederate); Confederate States
- Branch: United States Volunteers; Missouri State Guard; Confederate States Army
- Service years: 1846–1848 (USV); 1861–1862 (MSG); 1862–1865 (CSA)
- Rank: Captain (USV); Brigadier-General (MSG); Brigadier-General (CSA)
- Conflicts: Mexican–American War: Battle of El Brazito; Battle of the Sacramento River; American Civil War: Battle of Boonville; Battle of Carthage; Battle of Wilson's Creek; Battle of Prairie Grove; Battle of Helena; Battle of Pleasant Hill; Battle of Jenkins' Ferry; Price's Missouri Expedition; Franco-Mexican War †

Brigadier-General Mosby Monroe Parsons (May 21, 1822 – August 15, 1865) was a senior officer of the Confederate States Army who commanded infantry in the Trans-Mississippi Theater of the American Civil War. Parsons was murdered by Captain Dario Garza, at the head of a body of Mexican soldiers, on or about August 15, 1865, near China, Nuevo León, Mexico.

== Early life and career ==
The eldest child of Gustavus Adolphus Parsons and his wife Patience Monroe Bishop, Mosby Monroe Parsons was born in Charlottesville, Virginia. When he was 13, his parents moved to Cole County, Missouri. Two years later, they moved again to Jefferson City, which Parsons would thereafter make his home. As a young man, Mosby read law and was admitted to the bar in 1846. He served as a volunteer in the Mexican–American War with the rank of captain in Colonel Alexander W. Doniphan's regiment and was cited for gallantry at the Battle of Sacramento on February 28, 1847.

Returning to Missouri after the war, Parsons married Mary Wells on September 18, 1850. However, his wife died just three years later, leaving him with an infant son, Stephen Kearney Parsons. Parsons served as the United States District Attorney for western Missouri. In 1856, he was elected to the state legislature. He became a Missouri state senator in 1858, serving until the American Civil War.

== American Civil War ==
Parsons was appointed brigadier general in command of the Sixth Division of the Missouri State Guard. He arrived too late to participate in the skirmish at Boonville, but he went on to lead his division at Carthage and the Battle of Wilson's Creek in Missouri. Although his Missouri State Guardsmen participated in the Battle of Pea Ridge in Arkansas, Parsons was absent from this action seeking an appointment in the Confederate States Army in Richmond, Virginia.

Parsons was commissioned a brigadier general of the Confederacy on November 5, 1862, and led his infantry brigade in the Battle of Prairie Grove, Arkansas, one month later. His force would participate in the attack at Helena, Arkansas on July 4, 1863, and assisted Richard Taylor in thwarting Union Major General Nathaniel Banks' Red River Campaign of 1864 in Louisiana (Battle of Pleasant Hill), as well as opposing Union Major General Frederick Steele's Camden Expedition in Arkansas, including participation at the Battle of Jenkins' Ferry. Parsons was appointed a major general by Trans-Mississippi Departmental Commander Kirby Smith on April 30, 1864, although his promotion was never confirmed by Jefferson Davis.

== Murder in Mexico ==
After the war's end, Parsons, like many other Missouri Confederates, chose to go to Mexico rather than return to Missouri. Parsons and three companions, including his brother-in-law, Capt. Austin M. Standish, Standish's orderly William "Dutch Bill" Wenderling and former Confederate Congressman Aaron H. Conrow, were murdered by Captain Dario Garza, at the head of a body of Mexican soldiers, on or about August 15, 1865, near China, Nuevo León, as they were headed for Camargo Municipality, Tamaulipas. The bodies of Parsons and his comrades were buried in unmarked graves where they were killed.

In 1868, Parsons' son (Kearny Parsons) and sister (Mildred Standish), along with the family of Aaron Conrow, sued the Mexican government via the U.S. and Mexico Claims Commission Convention. In 1875, a judgment in the amount of almost US$50,000.00 in gold was awarded to each of the plaintiffs.

== Honors ==
Camp No. 718 of the Sons of Confederate Veterans in Jefferson City, Missouri, is named after him.

== See also ==
- List of American Civil War generals (Confederate)
- List of people from Virginia
