= Helena batteries =

19th century fortifications in Arkansas, United States

- U.S. National Register of Historic Places
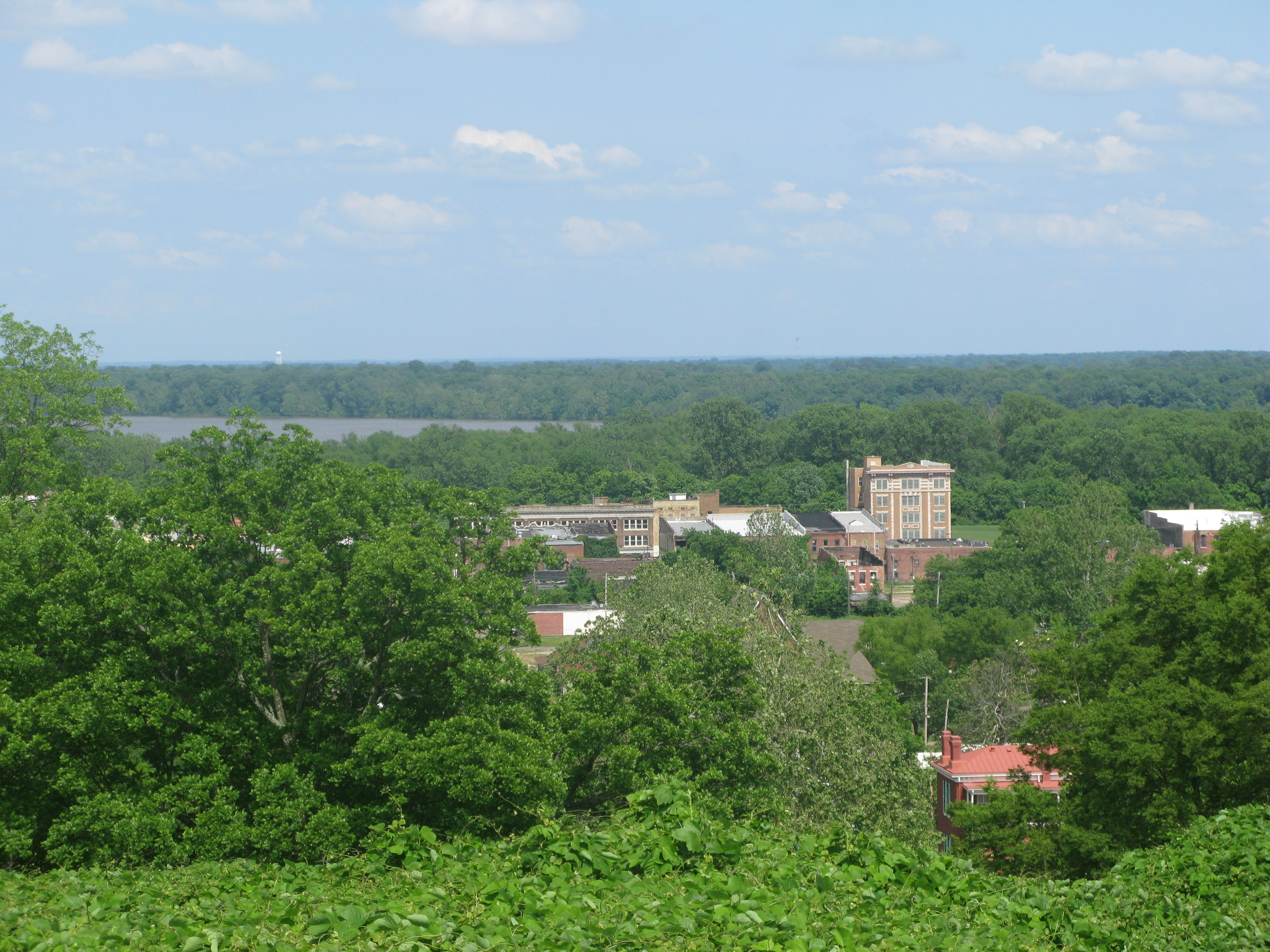
- View of Helena from Battery C Park

- Location within Arkansas
- Location: Helena (present-day Helena-West Helena), Arkansas
- Coordinates: 34°31′32.8″N 90°35′51.9″W
- Area: 10 acres (4.0 ha)
- Built: 1863 (163 years ago)
- NRHP reference No.: 78000615
- Added to NRHP: December 1, 1978

The Helena batteries, also known as the Union batteries at Helena, is a series of fortifications that were built in Helena (present-day Helena-West Helena), Arkansas. The earthworks were hastily erected in 1863 by Federal occupation forces during the American Civil War. The four hilltop batteries—A, B, C, and D—overlooked the roads leading into the town and played a significant role in the Battle of Helena that resulted in a strategic Union victory and secured the Arkansas side of the Mississippi River for the United States. Listed individually in the National Register of Historic Places, the batteries are part of the Helena Battlefield.

== History ==
Helena, Arkansas, is strategically located at the southern end of Crowley's Ridge, a geographic formation providing significant views over the Mississippi River. It was occupied by the Union army in 1862, and was used by them as a staging point for supporting troops in the Siege of Vicksburg, Mississippi, which began in May 1863. These occupation forces constructed a ring of defenses around the town to guard the major land approaches, and control the high ground overlooking Fort Curtis its major base just west of the town. The Union navy controlled the river, with the USS Tyler stationed nearby. The defenses built by the forces commanded by General Benjamin Prentiss at Helena included artillery batteries, rifle pits, and abatis.

Confederate military leaders at Little Rock, Arkansas, planned a land offensive in June 1863 to retake the town of Helena and cut the Union supply line, relieving the pressure on besieged city of Vicksburg. Under the overall command of Lieutenant-General Theophilus H. Holmes, Confederate forces launched an attack on Helena on July 4, 1863, the same day that Vicksburg was surrendered to Union forces. Prentiss ordered the construction of these four batteries in response to increased Confederate activity in the surrounding area in late June. The coordination of the separate elements of the Confederate attack were frustrated by felled trees laid across the approach roads by the defenders, and were eventually subjected to fire from all four batteries, as well as from the supporting Navy ships. Although the Confederates successfully took Battery C, fire from the other three drove them back. An assault on Battery D reached its rifle pits, but got no further. The Confederates suffered more than 1,600 casualties, as compared to 239 for Union forces.

== Sites ==
=== Battery A ===
Battery A is located on a 4-acre (1.6 ha) parcel at 34°32′15″N 90°35′33″W, atop Rightor Hill northwest of the junction of Adams and Columbia Street. This battery overlooked the Old St. Francis Road and the Sterling Road. It was manned by the 33rd Missouri and the 29th Iowa, who easily repulsed forces led by General John S. Marmaduke that were trying to take it.

=== Battery B ===
Battery B is located on a 1-acre (0.40 ha) parcel at 34°32′2″N 90°35′51″W, atop Carvill Hill northeast of the junction of Liberty Street and Summit Road, and several hundred yards southwest of Battery A. It overlooked the Upper St. Francis Road, and was manned by members of the 33rd Missouri. This battery was never itself endangered, and fired on Confederate forces attempting to reach Batteries A and C.

=== Battery C ===
Battery C was located on what is locally called Graveyard Hill, south of Clark and west of York Street (34°31′29″N 90°35′39″W), and is now a city park. The hill exhibits few surviving remnants of the intense fighting that took place here, because a significant portion of its eastern slope was removed in the 1930s for the construction of levees, and erosion has claimed most of the evidence on the hilltop of the earthworks and rifle pits. Battery C was manned by members of the 33rd Missouri, and provided supporting fire for the other positions in the early stages of the battle, until the Confederates began a direct assault on it. Its large guns were spiked by the Union forces before they withdrew, and established a defensive line about 250 yards (230 m) east of the summit. This area was the subject of intense fighting, and bombardment from the other three batteries and the gunboats. Confederate attempts to carry the assault to Fort Curtis and Battery D were turned back, and they withdrew from the battery before they had a chance to bring up their own artillery.

=== Battery D ===
Battery D stands on Hindman Hill, off Military Road southwest of downtown Helena (34°31′5″N 90°35′22″W), and overlooks the main road between Helena and Little Rock. Of the four batteries, it is the one that is the best preserved, with its earthworks and rifle pits still evident near the crest of the hill. The battery was manned by Union forces from Iowa, Missouri, and Indiana, and was the target of a Confederate assault launched at daybreak by Arkansas forces commanded by Brigadier General James F. Fagan. They successfully penetrated three levels of rifle pits despite withering fire from batteries C and D. Reinforcements sent to support the assault from Battery C were repulsed, and Fagan was ordered to withdraw. His orders did not reach all of his men, however, and a pocket of Confederates was surrounded and captured as a result.

== See also ==
- National Register of Historic Places listings in Phillips County, Arkansas
