= 33rd Iowa Infantry Regiment =

- Iowa state flag
- Active: October 4, 1862, to August 15, 1865
- Country: United States
- Allegiance: Union
- Branch: Infantry

The 33rd Iowa Infantry Regiment was an infantry regiment that served in the Union Army during the American Civil War.

== Service ==
The 33rd Iowa Infantry was organized at Oskaloosa, Iowa and mustered in for three years of Federal service on October 4, 1862.

The regiment was mustered out on August 15, 1865.

== Total strength and casualties ==
A total of 1242 men served in the 33rd Iowa at one time or another during its existence. It suffered 3 officers and 65 enlisted men who were killed in action or who died of their wounds and 1 officer and 215 enlisted men who died of disease, for a total of 284 fatalities.

== Commanders ==
- Colonel Samuel A. Rice
- Lieutenant Colonel Cyrus H. Mackey

== See also ==
- List of Iowa Civil War Units
- Iowa in the American Civil War
