= Frederick Steele =

United States Army officer (1819–1868)

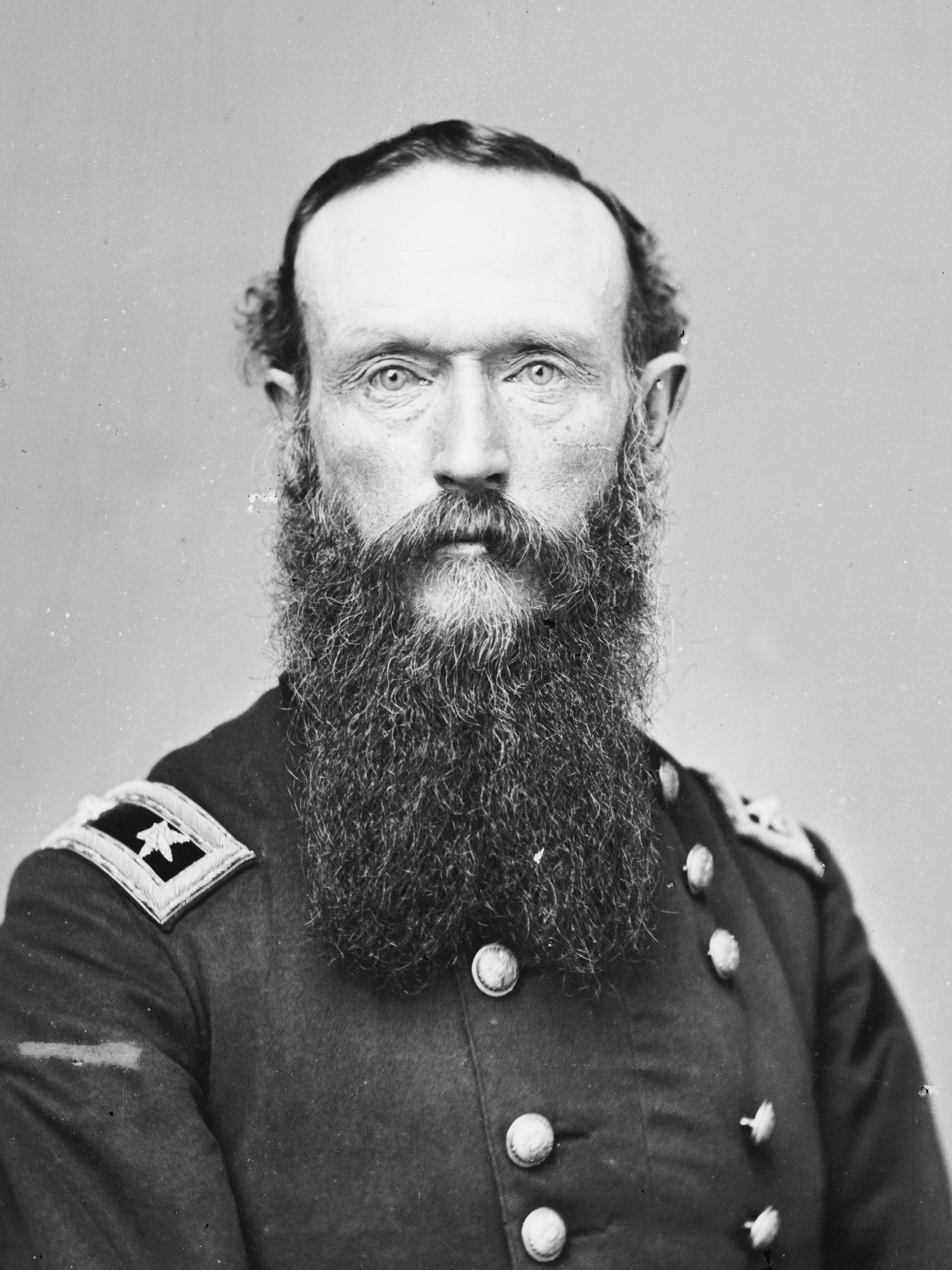
- Steele in uniform, c. 1863
- Born: January 14, 1819; Delhi, New York, U.S.
- Died: January 12, 1868 (aged 48); San Mateo, California, U.S.
- Burial place: Woodlawn Memorial Park, Colma, California, U.S.
- Military career
- Allegiance: United States
- Branch: United States Army
- Service years: 1843–1867
- Rank: Major General
- Commands: 8th Iowa Infantry (1861–62); Army of Arkansas (1863–64); Department of Arkansas and Seventh Army Corps (1864)
- Conflicts: Yuma War; Mexican-American War; American Civil War; Battle of Dug Springs; Battle of Wilson's Creek; Battle of Chickasaw Bayou; Battle of Arkansas Post; Vicksburg Campaign; Camden Expedition; Battle of Fort Blakeley

Major General Frederick Steele (January 14, 1819 – January 12, 1868) was an American military officer who served in the Army in the Mexican-American War, Yuma War, and American Civil War. He is most noted for capturing the Arkansas state capitol at Little Rock in 1863, escaping the besieged riverport city of Camden through successful deception tactics, and repulsing an attack by Confederate forces under generals Kirby Smith and Sterling Price at Jenkins' Ferry in 1864.

== Early life and education ==
Steele, son of Nathaniel and Dameras (née Johnson) Steele, was born in Delhi, New York.

He was an 1843 graduate of West Point, and later served in the Mexican–American War, where he participated in many engagements. Steele was meritoriously mentioned for distinguished bravery, and was promoted to first lieutenant in June 1848. He served in California during the Yuma War until 1853, and then to Fort Ridgely in Minnesota Territory and then Kansas Territory, and Nebraska Territory until the Civil War. He received his captain's commission on February 5, 1855.

== American Civil War ==
On May 14, 1861, Steele was appointed major in the 11th U.S. Infantry and fought at the Battle of Wilson's Creek. On September 23, 1861, he became colonel of the 8th Iowa Infantry. On January 30, 1862, Steele was appointed brigadier general of U.S. volunteers, to rank from January 29, 1862. He commanded the District of Southeast Missouri, but following the Union victory at the Battle of Pea Ridge, he took command of the 1st Division in the Army of the Southwest and briefly commanded the army from August 29 to October 7, 1862. On March 17, 1863, President Lincoln appointed Steele major general of volunteers, to rank from November 29, 1862. The president sent the nomination to the U.S. Senate on March 6, 1863, and the Senate confirmed it on March 13, 1863.

Steele's division was transferred to the Army of the Tennessee, becoming the 11th Division in the XIII Corps. He fought at the Battle of Chickasaw Bayou in December 1862, and in the Battle of Arkansas Post in January 1863. He commanded the Union forces in Steele's Greenville expedition in April. His division was renamed the 1st Division in Major General William T. Sherman's XV Corps during the Siege of Vicksburg.

On August 26, 1863, after the fall of Vicksburg, Steele received a brevet promotion to colonel in the U.S. Army. On July 27, 1863, he was placed in command of the Army of Arkansas. His army successfully captured Confederate-held Little Rock in September 1863, and subsequently pushed official Union boundaries south through the state. He was assigned command of VII Corps in the Department of Arkansas in the Trans-Mississippi Theater, holding command from January 6, 1864, to December 22, 1864.

Receiving intelligence from captured rebels there, and with his army on one-quarter rations, Steele conducted a successful feint operation toward the rebel capital at Washington, Arkansas, and left Thayer's division on the prairie, while he moved his main column eastward to Camden, believing that it contained stockpiles of provisions and forage for his horses. Upon entering Camden after brushing aside light opposition on April 15, Steele discovered that the enemy had destroyed most of the provisions and supplies there. He also discovered messages in the Camden telegraph office carelessly left behind by the fleeing rebels, confirming the earlier rumors and intelligence that General Banks had been repulsed at Mansfield Louisiana, and that Banks's army was in retreat down the Red River. Steele decided, based on this confirmed intelligence, to await provisions en route from Little Rock, scour the countryside for additional grain and forage, await developments in Louisiana, and then decide whether to continue south or return to Little Rock.

Price, meanwhile, besieged Camden from the west, north and south. One supply train reached Camden from Little Rock by way of Pine Bluff on April 22, temporarily relieving the food crisis in VII Corps. When Steele dispatched the wagons under escort back to Pine Bluff for more provisions on April 23, it was intercepted and ambushed by a task force of five rebel cavalry brigades under James Fagan at Marks Mills on April 25. Two-thirds of the Union 2nd Brigade were taken prisoner.

Learning of this disaster, Steele again employed a successful deception to exit from Camden, which was effected without detection on the night of April 26–27. Proceeding due north on the military road to Little Rock, elements of Marmaduke's division caught up with VII Corps on the ridge above Jenkins' Ferry on the Saline River on April 29, but were easily repulsed and kept at bay, enabling Steele to install a pontoon bridge over the Saline and establish strong interior defensive works to guard the crossing. By now, rebel Department of the Trans-Mississippi Commander Kirby Smith had arrived in Arkansas to take command of Price's force in the field. Smith brought with him two divisions of Arkansas and Texas infantry.

Fighting at Jenkins' Ferry commenced in a downpour the morning of April 30. Critical mistakes in troop management by both Price and Smith resulted in the rebel army committing its divisions in a piecemeal fashion, allowing Steele and his subordinates, Brigadier Generals Frederick Salomon and Samuel Rice, to engage and defeat the attacking rebels in turn with light casualties. The Confederates suffered heavily in this defeat; rebel Generals Marmaduke, Mosby Parsons and John Walker were effectively repulsed in three poorly executed rebel assaults. Through a further deception operation (reported independently after the war by a Union officer of the 77th Ohio and a Confederate sergeant in General Jo Shelby's command), General James Fagan's heretofore mentioned task force of five cavalry brigades was misdirected away from Jenkins' Ferry, and did not reach there until the fighting ended. Steele took his army back to Little Rock. In point of fact, Steele sent several messages to Union Army Chief of Staff Henry Halleck, to Sherman and to his Department Commander General John Schofield prior to the expedition, warning of a dearth of forage and provisions in southwest Arkansas, and also calling the military competency of political general Nathaniel Banks into question. Steele was finally compelled, against his better judgment, by newly appointed General-in-Chief Ulysses Grant (and Steele's classmate at West Point) to undertake the expedition to cooperate with Banks. Thus, when the intelligence confirmed Bank's failure against Dick Taylor in Louisiana, Steele had already formulated a plan to save the VII Corps.

Steele led a force of African-American soldiers, officially designated the "Column from Pensacola", in Major General Edward Canby's Army of West Mississippi between February 18, 1865, and May 18, 1865. His troops fought at the battles of Spanish Fort and Fort Blakeley.

On April 10, 1866, President Andrew Johnson nominated Steele for appointment to the brevet rank of brigadier general in the regular army, for services in the capture of Little Rock, to rank from March 13, 1865, and the U.S. Senate confirmed the appointment on May 4, 1866. On June 30, 1866, President Andrew Johnson nominated Steele for appointment to the brevet rank of major general in the regular army, for the Siege of Vicksburg and services during the war, to rank from March 13, 1865, and the U.S. Senate confirmed the appointment on July 25, 1866.

== Later life and honors ==
Steele was transferred to Texas in June 1865 and placed in command of United States forces along the Rio Grande. He subsequently commanded the Department of the Columbia, overseeing the Snake War, from December 1865 until November 1867. On July 28, 1866, Steele was appointed to the permanent grade of colonel of the 20th U.S. Infantry Regiment. Meanwhile, he had been mustered out of the volunteer service on March 1, 1867.

In November 1867, Steele took a leave of absence for health reasons. He died two months later on January 12, 1868, in San Mateo, California, from an injury suffered in a fall in a buggy accident caused when he suffered an apoplectic fit. He is buried in Woodlawn Memorial Park Cemetery, Colma, California.

A monument to Steele stands at Vicksburg National Military Park.

== See also ==
- List of American Civil War generals (Union)
