= Battle of Pleasant Hill =

1864 battle of the American Civil War

- Part of the American Civil War
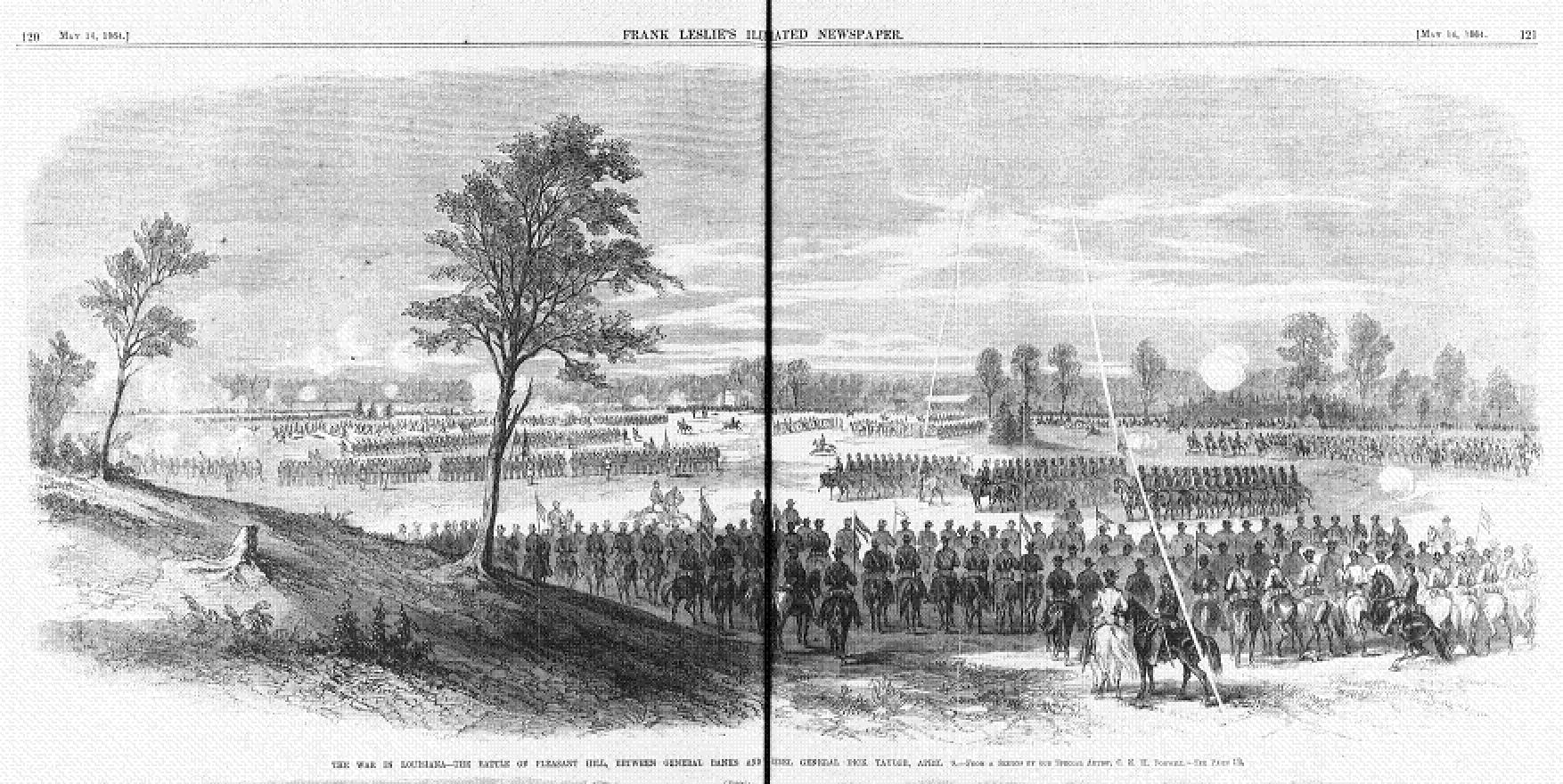
- Battle of Pleasant Hill by C. E. H. Bonwell — as illustrated in Frank Leslie's Weekly, May 14, 1864
Date	April 9, 1864 (162 years ago)
Location	Desoto and Sabine parishes, Louisiana 31°51′12″N 93°30′50″W
Result	See § Aftermath

Belligerents
United States (Union)	Confederate States

Commanders and leaders
Nathaniel P. Banks	Richard Taylor

Units involved
Army of the Gulf	Trans-Mississippi Department

Strength
12,000	12,100

Casualties and losses
1,369 total 150 killed 844 wounded 375 missing	~1,626 total ~1,200 killed and wounded 426 captured
- Location in Louisiana

The Battle of Pleasant Hill on April 9, 1864, in Louisiana formed part of the Red River Campaign during the American Civil War, when Union forces were attempting to occupy the Louisiana state capital, Shreveport.

The battle was essentially a continuation of the Battle of Mansfield, a Confederate victory, which had caused the Union commander, Major General Nathaniel P. Banks, to send his wagons, with most of his artillery, downriver in retreat. However, both sides had been reinforced through the night, and when the Confederate commander, Major General Richard Taylor launched an assault against the Union line, it was repulsed though at a high cost in casualties; the Union army retreated the next day. The majority of historians consider the battle to be a Union tactical victory, although some consider it to be a draw.

== Prelude ==
After the success of the Confederates at the Battle of Mansfield, April 8, 1864, Union forces retreated during the night and next morning took up a position on Pleasant Hill. The road from Mansfield to Pleasant Hill was "littered by burning wagons, abandoned knapsacks, arms, and cooking utensils. Federal stragglers and wounded were met by the hundreds and were quickly rounded up and sent to the rear," explains the historian John D. Winters of Louisiana Tech University in his The Civil War in Louisiana.

The Battle of Mansfield took place about 3 miles (4.8 km) southeast of the town of Mansfield at Sabine Cross Roads. Pleasant Hill was located about 16 miles (26 km) southeast of Sabine Cross Roads. Confederate reinforcements had arrived late on April 8 — Churchill's Arkansas Division arrived at Mansfield at 3.30 p.m. and Parson's Missouri Division (numbering 2,200 men) arrived at Mansfield at 6 p.m. Neither of these Divisions participated in the Battle of Mansfield — however, both would play a major role during the Battle of Pleasant Hill.

On the Union side reinforcements also arrived, when Maj. Gen. Andrew J. Smith, commanding detachments of 16th and 17th Corps, arrived from Grand Ecore late on the April 8, around nightfall, and encamped about 2 miles (3.2 km) from Pleasant Hill.

On the morning of April 9, Franklin ordered the baggage train to proceed to Grand Ecore. It left Pleasant Hill at 11 a.m., and included many pieces of artillery. Most of Franklin's Cavalry (commanded by Brig. Gen. Albert Lindley Lee) and the 13th Corps left with it. This included the Corps D'Afrique commanded by Colonel William H. Dickey (wounded on April 8) and Brig. Gen. Thomas E. G. Ransom's detachment of the 13th Corps, now under the command of Brig. Gen. Robert A. Cameron—Ransom was also wounded on the April 8. The baggage train made slow progress and was still only a few miles from Pleasant Hill when the major fighting began later that day. Brig. Gen. Charles P. Stone, Chief of Staff, and others, attempted to get Cameron to return to Pleasant Hill throughout the day, but he failed to do so—he stated that he never received any written orders to return. Banks doesn't appear to have been fully aware of the exact orders Cameron had received from Franklin.

The Union side lost 18 pieces of artillery at the Battle of Mansfield. These were turned on the Union forces the next day at Pleasant Hill. Confederate Brig. Gen. Jean Jacques Alexandre Alfred Mouton was killed during the Battle of Mansfield, April 8, 1864; Brig. Gen. Camille J. de Polignac commanded Mouton's forces at Pleasant Hill. Confederate Trans-Mississippi Department commander Lt. Gen. Edmund Kirby Smith, who was at Shreveport, received a dispatch from Taylor that reached him at 4 a.m., April 9. It informed him of the Battle of Mansfield. Smith then rode 45 miles (72 km) to Pleasant Hill, but did not reach there in time for the battle—arriving around nightfall.

Among the Union regiments fighting at Pleasant Hill on April 9 was the 47th Pennsylvania Infantry Regiment. Part of the Second Brigade in Emory's 14th Corps, the 47th Pennsylvania was the only regiment from the Keystone State to fight in the Union's 1864 Red River Campaign. Led by Col. Tilghman H. Good, the 47th Pennsylvania sustained a significant number of casualties, including several men who were captured by Confederate troops. Held initially at Pleasant Hill, POWs from the 47th Pennsylvania and other Union regiments were marched and moved by rail to the largest Confederate prison west of the Mississippi, Camp Ford, which was situated near Tyler, Texas. Other members of the 47th ended up at Camp Groce near Hempstead, Texas, and/or at the Confederate hospital in Shreveport.

== Opposing forces ==
Commanders
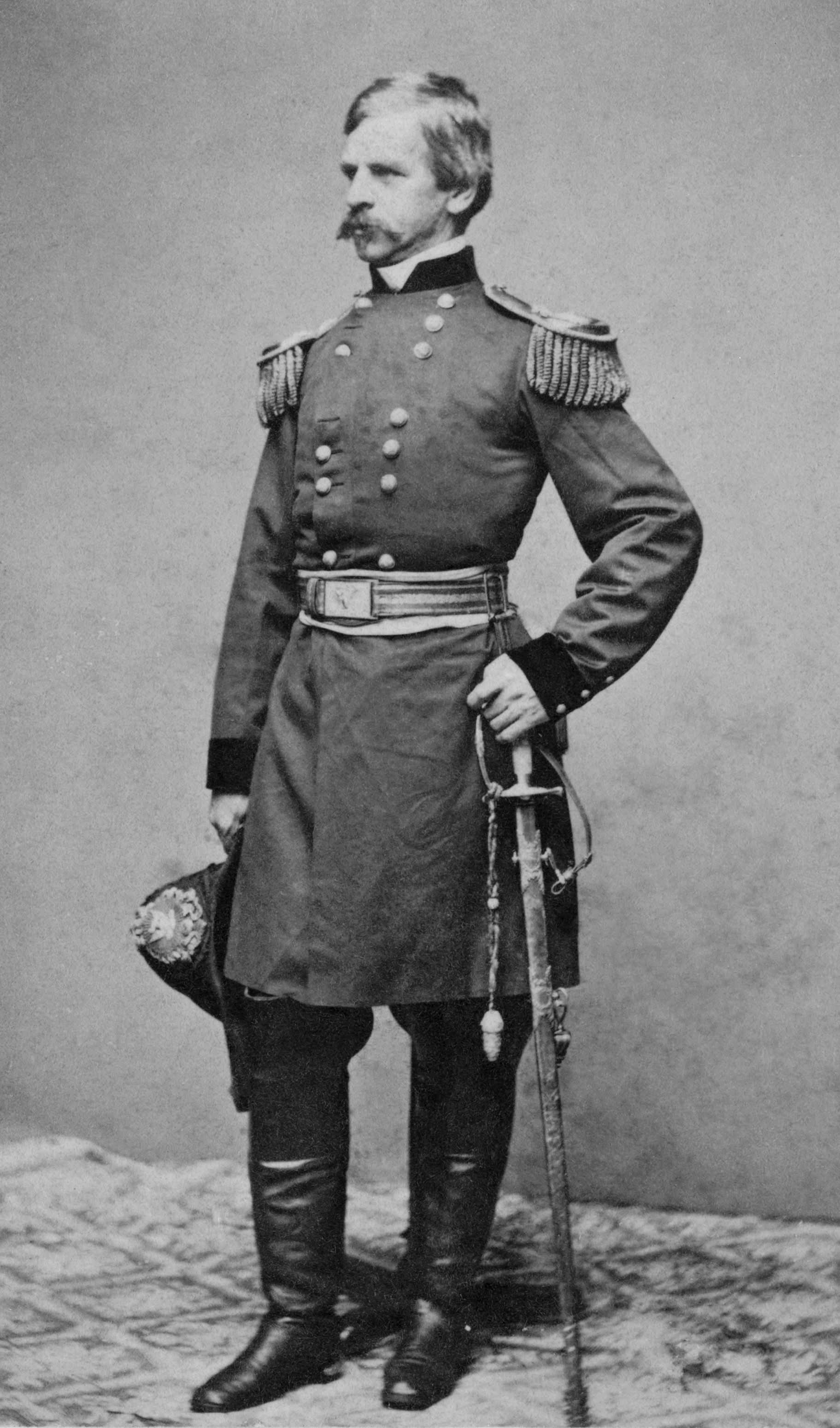
Maj. Gen. Nathaniel Prentice Banks, USA

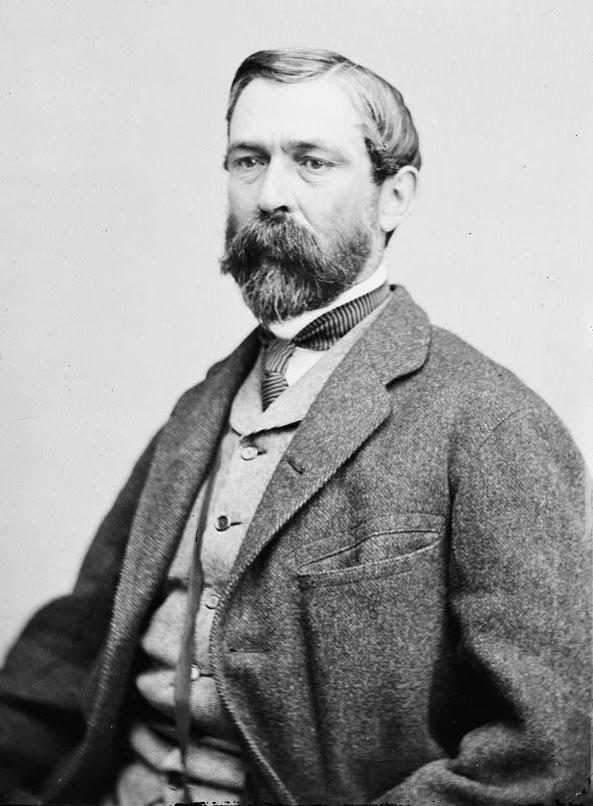
Maj. Gen. Richard Taylor, CSA

Other main leaders
Union		Confederate
	Maj. Gen. William B. Franklin	Brig. Gen. Thomas J. Churchill
	Brig. Gen. William H. Emory	Brig. Gen. James C. Tappan
	Brig. Gen. James W. McMillan	Brig. Gen. Mosby M. Parsons
	Brig. Gen. William Dwight	Maj. Gen. John G. Walker
	Colonel William T. Shaw	Brig. Gen. Camille J. de Polignac
	Colonel Lewis Benedict	Brig. Gen. William Read Scurry
	Brig. Gen. Andrew J. Smith	Brig. Gen. Thomas J. Green
	Brig. Gen. Joseph A. Mower	Brig. Gen. Hamilton P. Bee
	Colonel William F. Lynch	Brig. Gen. Xavier Debray
	Colonel Risdon M. Moore	Brig. Gen. Augustus C. Buchel
†	Brig. Gen. Richard Arnold	Brig. Gen. James P. Major
	Colonel Thomas J. Lucas	Brig. Gen. Thomas Neville Waul
	Colonel Sylvester G. Hill	Brig. Gen. Arthur P. Bagby, Jr.
	Colonel Lucius F. Hubbard	Colonel Robert Dillard Stone
	Captain George T. Hebard	Colonel Horace Randal
	Colonel Francis Fessenden	Colonel Henry Gray
		Colonel S. P. Burns
		Colonel H. L. Grinstead
		Colonel Lucien C. Gause
		Brig. Gen. John Bullock Clark, Jr.

== Battlefield ==
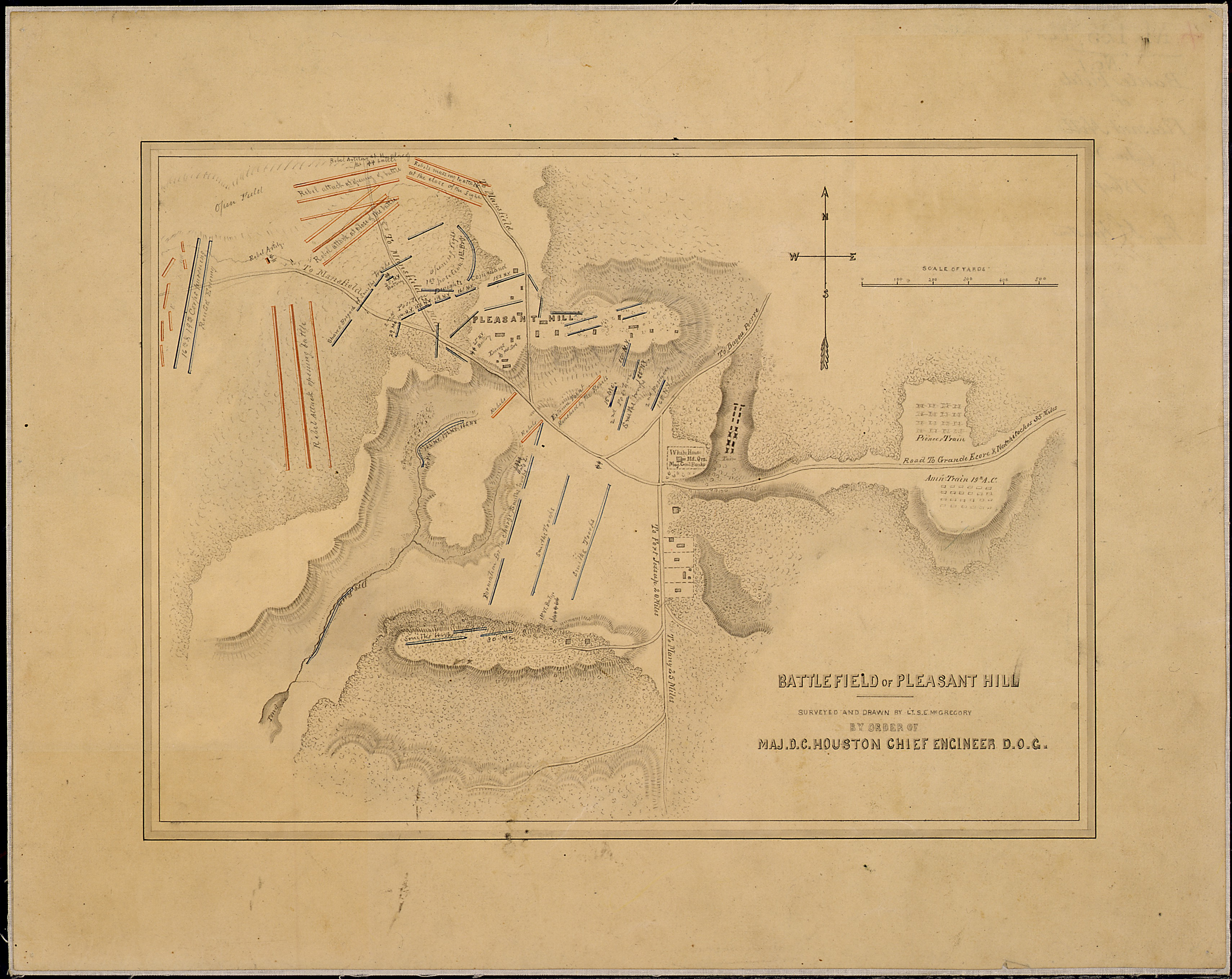
Department of the Gulf map of the Battlefield of Pleasant Hill, c. 1864

In 1864, Pleasant Hill was a small village, situated about 2 miles (3.2 km) north the current village of Pleasant Hill—a new village that later grew up nearby (in order to be closer to the railroad) and that took the same name, after the old village was abandoned. The site of the old village is today referred to as the "Old town" or "Old Pleasant Hill". Dr. Harris H. Beecher, Assistant-Surgeon, 114th New York Volunteer Infantry Regiment, present at the battle, described the village of Pleasant Hill as

a town of about twelve or fifteen houses, situated on a clearing in the woods, of a mile or so in extent, and elevated a trifle above the general level of the surrounding country.

In 1864, the countryside in this part of Louisiana mostly consisted of pine forests and scrub oaks. According to Banks,

The shortest and only practicable road from Natchitoches to Shreveport was the stage road through Pleasant Hill and Mansfield (distance 100 miles), through a barren, sandy country, with less water and less forage, the greater portion an unbroken pine forest.

A newspaper described Pleasant Hill as "a little village situated on a low ridge, containing in peace-times probably 300 inhabitants." It further stated that,

The battle-field of Pleasant Hill ... is a large, open field, which had once been cultivated, but is now overgrown with weeds and bushes. The slightly-elevated centre of the field, from which the name Pleasant Hill is taken is nothing more than a long mound, hardly worthy of the name of hill. A semi-circular belt of timber runs around the field on the Shreveport side.

Historian John Winters describes Pleasant Hill as a "piney-woods summer resort consisting of a dozen or more houses clustered along a cleared knoll, offered Banks many advantages as a battlefield, but because of the great distance from the main supply base at Alexandria and the serious lack of sufficient drinking water for an entire army, Banks could not hold this position for any length of time. During the one day, April 9, most of the rain water stored in the cisterns was depleted. Without making a final decision concerning the future of his campaign, Banks sent his wagon trains ... on the way toward Grand Ecore."

== Battle ==
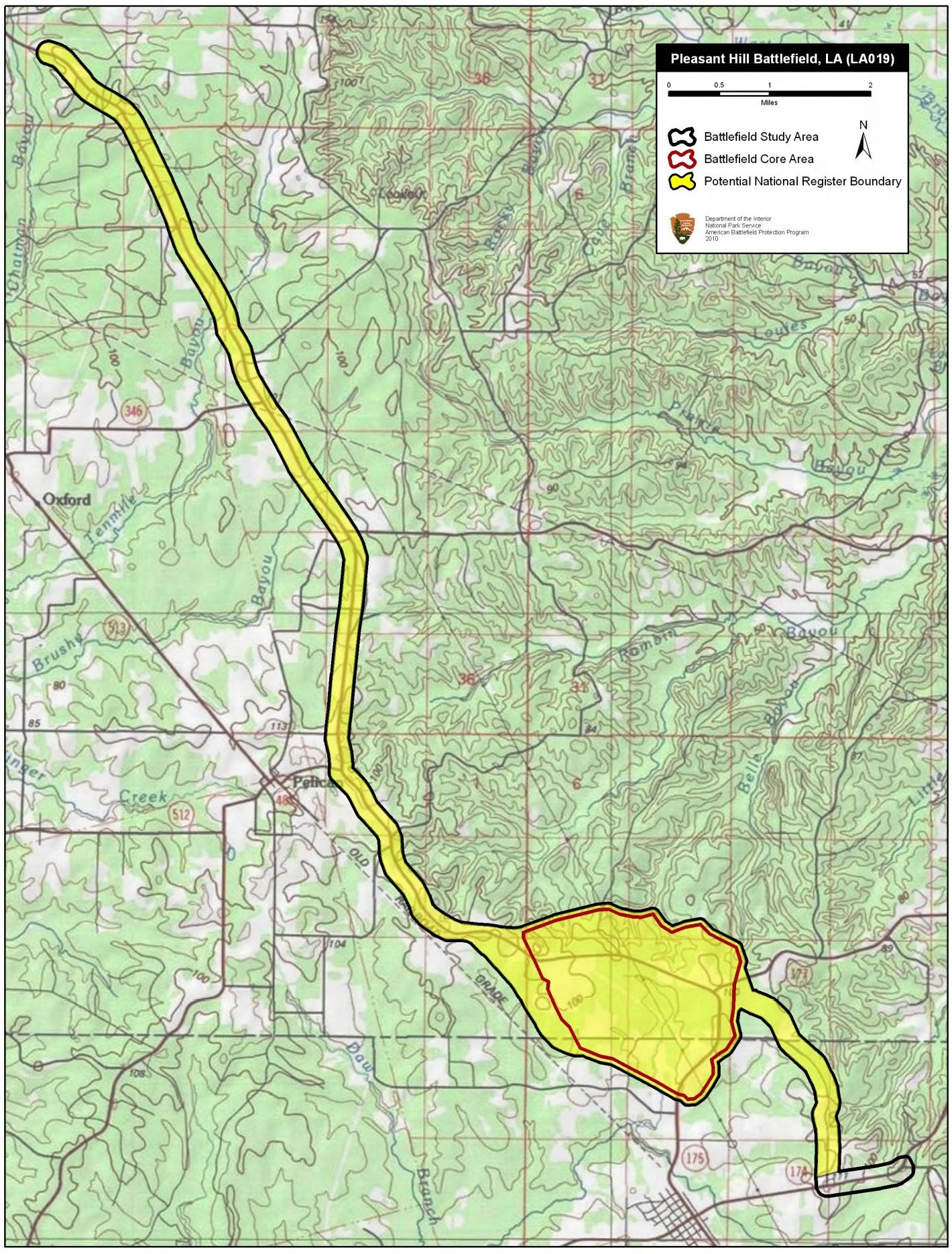
Map of Pleasant Hill Battlefield core and study areas by the American Battlefield Protection Program

According to Maj. Gen. Nathaniel P. Banks' Report of the Battle,

The enemy began to reconnoiter the new position we had assumed at 11 o'clock on the morning of the 9th, and as early as 1 or 2 o'clock opened a sharp fire of skirmishers, which was kept up at intervals during the afternoon.

At 5 p.m., the Confederate forces launched their attack, charging the entire Union line. Walker's and Major's attack on the Union right had little success — the Union right, for the most part, held its ground. However, overall, this initial charge by the Confederates was highly successful and many of the positions down the Union left and center were overrun by Churchill's and Parson's forces and the Union positions were forced backwards. However, the Union side succeeded in halting the advance and regained the left and center ground, before driving the Confederates from the field. The fiercely fought battle lasted about two hours. Losses were heavy on both sides. The 32nd Iowa Infantry sustained especially heavy casualties, as it was cut off from the rest of the Union forces during the battle.

Confederate Brig. Gen. Hamilton P. Bee, with two regiments in columns of four rode swiftly down the Pleasant Hill road toward the enemy lines. The Confederate forces were suddenly attacked at close range by Federals concealed behind a fence. Winters describes the scene, accordingly: "Men toppled from their saddles, wounded horses screamed in anguish, and for a moment pandemonium reigned. Bee's men took temporary shelter ... in a series of small ravines studded with young pines until they recovered from the shock of the unexpected attack. Bee rallied his men but in the process had two horses shot from under him. Colonel [Xavier B.] Debray was injured when he fell from the saddle of his dead horse. ... Debray was able to withdraw his men safely to the rear leaving, however, about a third of them killed or wounded on the front."

Banks and his army began their retreat from Pleasant Hill at 1 a.m. on the morning of the April 10 (just a few hours after the battle had ended).

== Aftermath ==
According to Brig. Gen. Hamilton P. Bee, writing from his headquarters at Pleasant Hill on April 10, 1864, he was in possession of the battlefield of Pleasant Hill at daylight on the morning of April 10 and he wrote that,

The day has been passed in burying the dead of both armies and caring for the Federal wounded, our own wounded having been cared for the night before.

A number of Union soldiers were captured during the battle (and many more at the Battle of Mansfield), and were taken to Camp Ford, a Confederate prisoner-of-war Camp, near Tyler, Texas. Most were kept prisoner here for the next year or so, and were not released until a general exchange of prisoners occurred near the end of the war—a small number, however, were released at an earlier date.

After the Battle of Pleasant Hill, Banks and his Union forces retreated to Grand Ecore and abandoned plans to capture Shreveport, by then the Louisiana state capital. Some of the wounded, perhaps thirty in number from both Pleasant Hill and Mansfield, were taken to Minden for treatment. Those who died of their wounds there were interred without markers in the historic Minden Cemetery. They were finally recognized with markers erected on March 25, 2008, by the Sons of Confederate Veterans.

Historian Ludwell H. Johnson refers to the battle as a Union tactical victory; the majority of historians agree with this view, although a few consider the action to have been a draw. The battle's outcome was costly for both sides, however; according to Brooksher, the 1864 Red River campaign helped to prolong the war by tying down Union resources from other fronts.
