= Battle of Bayou Fourche order of battle =

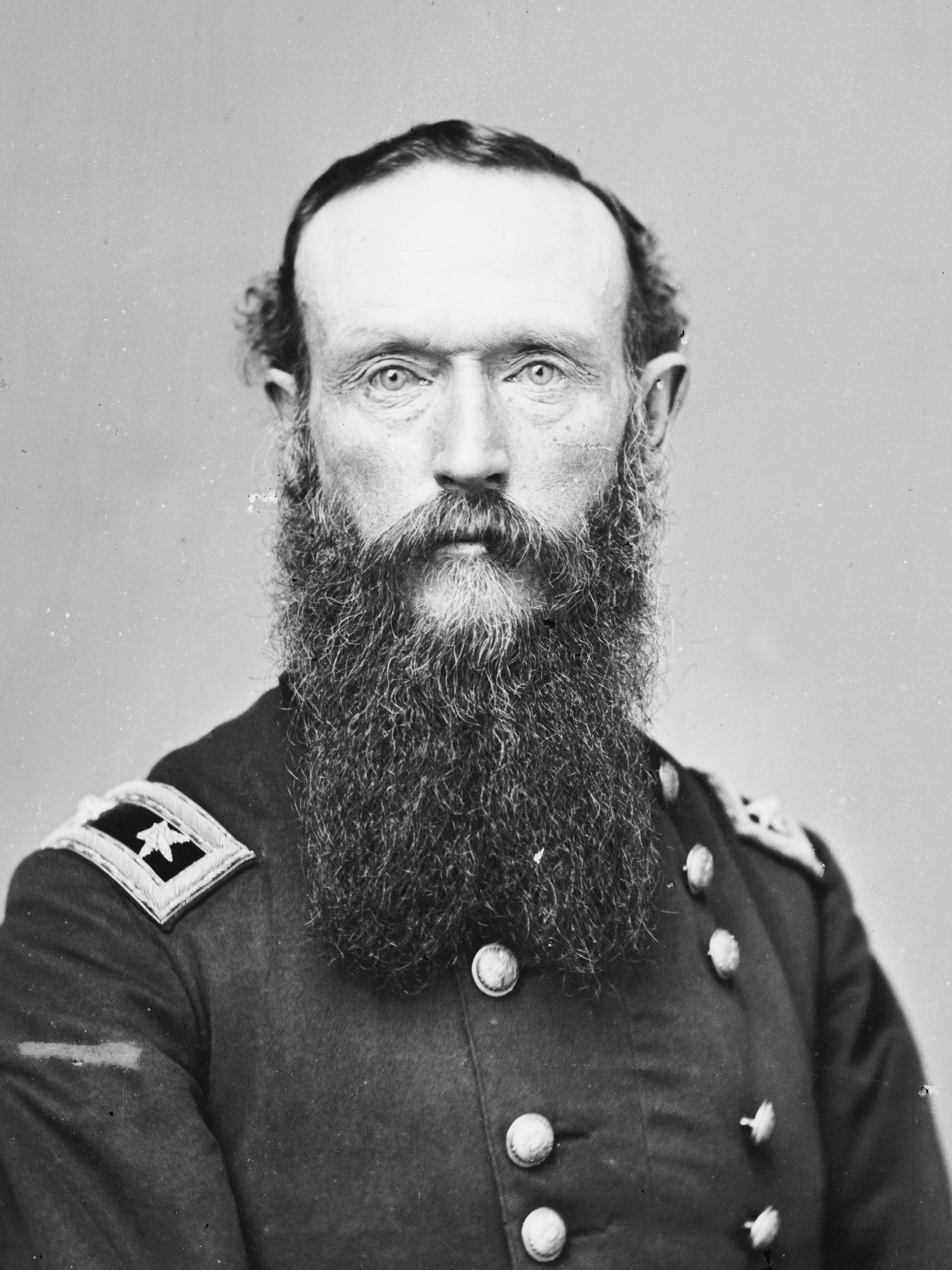
Maj. Gen. Frederick Steele, USA

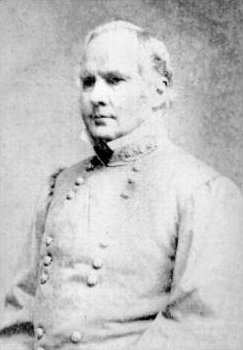
Maj. Gen. Sterling Price, CSA

The battle pitted Steele's Union troops against Price's Confederates.

The Battle of Bayou Fourche (September 10, 1863) saw Union forces under the overall command of Frederick Steele clash with Confederate forces led by Sterling Price near Little Rock, Arkansas. The only fighting occurred when Steele's cavalry commanded by John W. Davidson crossed to the south side of the Arkansas River and compelled the Confederate cavalry under John S. Marmaduke to abandon its defensive position behind Bayou Fourche. Price's outnumbered forces evacuated Little Rock and withdrew south to Arkadelphia. The Union occupation of Little Rock was the final action in a campaign that started on August 18 when Steele's troops marched west from DeValls Bluff.

== Abbreviations used ==
=== Military rank ===
- Maj. Gen. = Major General
- Brig. Gen. = Brigadier General
- Col. = Colonel
- Lieut. Col. = Lieutenant Colonel
- Maj. = Major
- Capt. = Captain
- 1st Lieut. = First Lieutenant

=== Other ===
- (k) = killed in action
- (w) = wounded
- (c) = captured

=== Artillery ===
- 10lb PR = 10-pounder Parrott rifle
- 12lb How = M1841 12-pounder howitzer
- 14lb JR = 14-pounder James rifle
- 3-in OR = 3-inch Ordnance rifle
- 6lb Gun = M1841 6-pounder field gun
- 6lb Rifle = M1841 6-pounder field gun (rifled)
- Mtn How = M1841 mountain howitzer

== Union forces ==
Union Army: Maj. Gen. Frederick Steele

- Present aggregate (Aug. 18, 1863): 13,000, 57 guns (18 guns with Davidson), 14,500 including True's brigade.
- Present for duty (Sept. 10, 1863): 10,477
- Present aggregate (Aug. 18, 1863): 13,207, 49 guns
- Present for duty (Aug. 18, 1863): 4,652 cavalry, 4,493 infantry, 288 artillery, 9,433 total
- Casualties: 18 killed, 118 wounded, 1 missing
- Cavalry Escort:
  - Company D, 3rd Illinois Cavalry Regiment, 1st Lieut. James K. McLean
  - Kane County, Illinois Cavalry, 1st Lieut. Eben C. Litherland

Union Army: Little Rock Expedition
Division	Brigade	Unit	Commander
First (Cavalry) Division; Brig. Gen. John W. Davidson; 6,000 cavalry and 18 guns Davidson	First Brigade; Col. Lewis Merrill	2nd Missouri Volunteer Cavalry Regiment (Merrill's Horse)	Maj. Garrison Harker
First (Cavalry) Division; Brig. Gen. John W. Davidson; 6,000 cavalry and 18 guns Davidson	First Brigade; Col. Lewis Merrill	7th Missouri Volunteer Cavalry Regiment	Lieut. Col. John L. Chandler
First (Cavalry) Division; Brig. Gen. John W. Davidson; 6,000 cavalry and 18 guns Davidson	First Brigade; Col. Lewis Merrill	8th Missouri Volunteer Cavalry Regiment	Col. Washington F. Geiger
First (Cavalry) Division; Brig. Gen. John W. Davidson; 6,000 cavalry and 18 guns Davidson	Second Brigade; Col. John Montgomery Glover	10th Illinois Cavalry Regiment	Col. Dudley Wickersham; Lieut. Col. James Stuart
First (Cavalry) Division; Brig. Gen. John W. Davidson; 6,000 cavalry and 18 guns Davidson	Second Brigade; Col. John Montgomery Glover	1st Iowa Volunteer Cavalry Regiment	Lt. Col. Daniel Anderson; Maj. Joseph W. Caldwell
First (Cavalry) Division; Brig. Gen. John W. Davidson; 6,000 cavalry and 18 guns Davidson	Second Brigade; Col. John Montgomery Glover	3d Missouri Volunteer Cavalry Regiment	Lieut. Col. T. G. Black; Capt. J. H. Reed
First (Cavalry) Division; Brig. Gen. John W. Davidson; 6,000 cavalry and 18 guns Davidson	Reserve Brigade; Col. John. F. Ritter	13th Illinois Cavalry Regiment	Maj. Lothar Lippert
First (Cavalry) Division; Brig. Gen. John W. Davidson; 6,000 cavalry and 18 guns Davidson	Reserve Brigade; Col. John. F. Ritter	3rd Iowa Volunteer Cavalry Regiment	Maj. George Duffield
First (Cavalry) Division; Brig. Gen. John W. Davidson; 6,000 cavalry and 18 guns Davidson	Reserve Brigade; Col. John. F. Ritter	1st Missouri Volunteer Cavalry Regiment	Capt. J. W. Fuller
First (Cavalry) Division; Brig. Gen. John W. Davidson; 6,000 cavalry and 18 guns Davidson	Reserve Brigade; Col. John. F. Ritter	32nd Iowa Volunteer Infantry Regiment (mounted)	Lieut. Col. Edward H. Mix; Maj. Gustavus A. Eberhard
First (Cavalry) Division; Brig. Gen. John W. Davidson; 6,000 cavalry and 18 guns Davidson	Artillery; Capt. Julius L. Hadley	Battery K, 2nd Missouri Light Artillery (4 x 3-in OR, 2 x 12lb How)	1st Lieut. T. S. Clarkson
First (Cavalry) Division; Brig. Gen. John W. Davidson; 6,000 cavalry and 18 guns Davidson	Artillery; Capt. Julius L. Hadley	Battery M, 2nd Missouri Light Artillery (4 x Mtn How)	Capt. Gustav Stange
First (Cavalry) Division; Brig. Gen. John W. Davidson; 6,000 cavalry and 18 guns Davidson	Artillery; Capt. Julius L. Hadley	Howitzer Battery, 2d Missouri Cavalry	1st Lieut. G. F. Lovejoy (w)
First (Cavalry) Division; Brig. Gen. John W. Davidson; 6,000 cavalry and 18 guns Davidson	Artillery; Capt. Julius L. Hadley	25th Ohio Battery (2 x 3-in OR, 4 x 6lb Rifle)	1st Lieut. E. B. Hubbard
Second Division; Col. William E. McLean; Col. Adolph Englemann	First Brigade; Col. William H. Graves	18th Illinois Infantry Regiment	Col. Daniel H. Brush
Second Division; Col. William E. McLean; Col. Adolph Englemann	First Brigade; Col. William H. Graves	43rd Illinois Infantry Regiment	Maj. Charles Stephani
Second Division; Col. William E. McLean; Col. Adolph Englemann	First Brigade; Col. William H. Graves	54th Illinois Infantry Regiment	Col. Greenville M. Mitchell
Second Division; Col. William E. McLean; Col. Adolph Englemann	First Brigade; Col. William H. Graves	61st Illinois Infantry Regiment	Lieut. Col. Simon P. Ohr
Second Division; Col. William E. McLean; Col. Adolph Englemann	First Brigade; Col. William H. Graves	106th Illinois Infantry Regiment	Lieut. Col. Henry Yates
Second Division; Col. William E. McLean; Col. Adolph Englemann	First Brigade; Col. William H. Graves	12th Michigan Volunteer Infantry Regiment	Lieut. Col. Dwight May
Second Division; Col. William E. McLean; Col. Adolph Englemann	Second Brigade; Col. Oliver Wood	126th Illinois Infantry Regiment	Lieut. Col. Ezra M. Beardsley
Second Division; Col. William E. McLean; Col. Adolph Englemann	Second Brigade; Col. Oliver Wood	40th Iowa Volunteer Infantry Regiment	Lieut. Col. Samuel F. Cooper
Second Division; Col. William E. McLean; Col. Adolph Englemann	Second Brigade; Col. Oliver Wood	3rd Minnesota Volunteer Infantry Regiment	Col. Christopher C. Andrews
Second Division; Col. William E. McLean; Col. Adolph Englemann	Second Brigade; Col. Oliver Wood	22nd Ohio Infantry Regiment	Lieut. Col. Homer Thrall
Second Division; Col. William E. McLean; Col. Adolph Englemann	Second Brigade; Col. Oliver Wood	27th Wisconsin Volunteer Infantry Regiment	Col. Conrad Krez
Third Division; Brig. Gen. Samuel Allen Rice Rice	First Brigade; Col. Charles W. Kittredge	43rd Indiana Infantry Regiment	Lieut. Col. John C. Major
Third Division; Brig. Gen. Samuel Allen Rice Rice	First Brigade; Col. Charles W. Kittredge	36th Iowa Volunteer Infantry Regiment	Lieut. Col. Francis M. Drake
Third Division; Brig. Gen. Samuel Allen Rice Rice	First Brigade; Col. Charles W. Kittredge	77th Ohio Infantry Regiment	Col. William B. Mason
Third Division; Brig. Gen. Samuel Allen Rice Rice	Second Brigade; Col. Thomas H. Benton Jr.	29th Iowa Volunteer Infantry Regiment	Lieut. Col. Robert F. Patterson
Third Division; Brig. Gen. Samuel Allen Rice Rice	Second Brigade; Col. Thomas H. Benton Jr.	33rd Iowa Volunteer Infantry Regiment	Lieut. Col. Cyrus H. Mackey
Third Division; Brig. Gen. Samuel Allen Rice Rice	Second Brigade; Col. Thomas H. Benton Jr.	28th Wisconsin Volunteer Infantry Regiment	Maj. Calvert C. White
Independent Cavalry	Independent Brigade; Col. Powell Clayton	1st Indiana Cavalry Regiment	Lieut. Col. Thomas N. Pace
Independent Cavalry	Independent Brigade; Col. Powell Clayton	5th Kansas Volunteer Cavalry Regiment	Lieut. Col. Wilton A. Jenkins
Independent Infantry	Independent Brigade; Col. James M. True	49th Illinois Infantry Regiment	Col. Phineas Pease
Independent Infantry	Independent Brigade; Col. James M. True	62nd Illinois Infantry Regiment	Lieut. Col. Stephen M. Meeker
Independent Infantry	Independent Brigade; Col. James M. True	50th Indiana Infantry Regiment	Lieut. Col. Samuel T. Wells
Independent Infantry	Independent Brigade; Col. James M. True	27th Iowa Volunteer Infantry Regiment	Col. James Isham Gilbert
Independent Infantry	Independent Brigade; Col. James M. True	Springfield Illinois Light Artillery (6 x 14lb JR)	Capt. Thomas F. Vaughn
Independent Artillery	Artillery Brigade; Capt. Mortimer M. Haden	3rd Iowa Independent Battery Light Artillery (4 x 6lb Gun, 3 x 12lb How, 1 x 3-in OR, 1 x 10lb PR)	1st Lieut. Melvil C. Wright
Independent Artillery	Artillery Brigade; Capt. Mortimer M. Haden	Battery K, 1st Missouri Light Artillery (4 x 10lb PR)	Capt. Stillman O. Fish
Independent Artillery	Artillery Brigade; Capt. Mortimer M. Haden	5th Ohio Battery (2 x 6lb Gun, 2 x 14lb JR)	1st Lieut. John D. Burner
Independent Artillery	Artillery Brigade; Capt. Mortimer M. Haden	11th Ohio Battery (2 x 6lb Gun, 2 x 12lb How, 1 x 6lb Rifle)	Capt. Frank C. Sands

== Confederate forces ==
Confederate Army: Maj. Gen. Sterling Price

- On July 23, 1863, the department commander Lieut. Gen. Theophilus H. Holmes became ill and was superseded by Price.
- On September 6, 1863, Brig. Gen. Marmaduke mortally wounded Brig. Gen. Walker in a duel. Col. Dobbins assumed command of Walker's division.
- Marmaduke placed Dobbins under arrest on September 10 for disobedience of orders and command devolved upon Col. Newton. Price later suspended Dobbins's arrest.
- Present for duty: 7,749. About 6,500 were north of the Arkansas River and 1,250 south of the river.
- Aggregate present (September): 10,665, 32 guns. Present for duty: 8,532.
- Casualties: 12 killed, 34 wounded, 18 missing.

Confederate Army: Little Rock Expedition
Division	Brigade	Unit	Commander
Marmaduke's Cavalry Division; Brig. Gen. John S. Marmaduke Marmaduke	Shelby's Brigade; Lieut. Col. Benjamin F. Gordon	5th Missouri Cavalry Regiment	Lieut. Col. B. F. Gordon
Marmaduke's Cavalry Division; Brig. Gen. John S. Marmaduke Marmaduke	Shelby's Brigade; Lieut. Col. Benjamin F. Gordon	6th Missouri Cavalry Regiment	Col. Gideon W. Thompson
Marmaduke's Cavalry Division; Brig. Gen. John S. Marmaduke Marmaduke	Shelby's Brigade; Lieut. Col. Benjamin F. Gordon	10th Missouri Cavalry Battalion	Maj. Benjamin Elliott
Marmaduke's Cavalry Division; Brig. Gen. John S. Marmaduke Marmaduke	Shelby's Brigade; Lieut. Col. Benjamin F. Gordon	2nd Missouri Field Battery (2 x 6lb Gun, 2 x 10lb PR)	Capt. Joseph Bledsoe
Marmaduke's Cavalry Division; Brig. Gen. John S. Marmaduke Marmaduke	Marmaduke's Brigade; Col. William L. Jeffers	8th Missouri Cavalry Regiment	Lieut. Col. S. J. Ward
Marmaduke's Cavalry Division; Brig. Gen. John S. Marmaduke Marmaduke	Marmaduke's Brigade; Col. William L. Jeffers	3rd Missouri Cavalry Regiment	Maj. L. A. Campbell
Marmaduke's Cavalry Division; Brig. Gen. John S. Marmaduke Marmaduke	Marmaduke's Brigade; Col. William L. Jeffers	4th Missouri Cavalry Regiment	Lieut. Col. W. J. Preston
Marmaduke's Cavalry Division; Brig. Gen. John S. Marmaduke Marmaduke	Marmaduke's Brigade; Col. William L. Jeffers	11th Missouri Cavalry Battalion	Lieut. Col. M. L. Young
Marmaduke's Cavalry Division; Brig. Gen. John S. Marmaduke Marmaduke	Marmaduke's Brigade; Col. William L. Jeffers	Prairie Gun Battery, Missouri Artillery	1st Lieut. T. J. Williams
Walker's Cavalry Division; Brig. Gen. Lucius M. Walker; Col. Archibald S. Dobbins; Col. Robert C. Newton Walker	Dobbin's Brigade; Col. A. S. Dobbins; Col. R. C. Newton	1st Arkansas Cavalry Regiment (Dobbin's)	Maj. S. Corley (k); Capt. M. M. Bateman
Walker's Cavalry Division; Brig. Gen. Lucius M. Walker; Col. Archibald S. Dobbins; Col. Robert C. Newton Walker	Dobbin's Brigade; Col. A. S. Dobbins; Col. R. C. Newton	5th Arkansas Cavalry Regiment	Col. R. C. Newton, Maj. J. P. Bull
Walker's Cavalry Division; Brig. Gen. Lucius M. Walker; Col. Archibald S. Dobbins; Col. Robert C. Newton Walker	Dobbin's Brigade; Col. A. S. Dobbins; Col. R. C. Newton	6th Arkansas Field Battery	Capt. C. B. Etter
Walker's Cavalry Division; Brig. Gen. Lucius M. Walker; Col. Archibald S. Dobbins; Col. Robert C. Newton Walker	Carter's Brigade; Col. George W. Carter	21st Texas Cavalry Regiment (Note: The 21st Texas Cavalry was picketing the Arkansas River and missed the fighting.)	Lieut. Col. Dewitt C. Giddings
Walker's Cavalry Division; Brig. Gen. Lucius M. Walker; Col. Archibald S. Dobbins; Col. Robert C. Newton Walker	Carter's Brigade; Col. George W. Carter	Morgan's Texas Cavalry Squadron	Maj. Charles L. Morgan
Walker's Cavalry Division; Brig. Gen. Lucius M. Walker; Col. Archibald S. Dobbins; Col. Robert C. Newton Walker	Carter's Brigade; Col. George W. Carter	Johnson's Spy Company, Texas Cavalry	Capt. Alf Johnson
Walker's Cavalry Division; Brig. Gen. Lucius M. Walker; Col. Archibald S. Dobbins; Col. Robert C. Newton Walker	Carter's Brigade; Col. George W. Carter	Denson's Company, Louisiana Cavalry	Capt. William B. Denson
Walker's Cavalry Division; Brig. Gen. Lucius M. Walker; Col. Archibald S. Dobbins; Col. Robert C. Newton Walker	Carter's Brigade; Col. George W. Carter	10th Texas Field Battery	Capt. Joseph H. Pratt
Price's Division; Brig. Gen. Daniel M. Frost Frost	McRae's Brigade; Brig. Gen. Dandridge McRae	32nd Arkansas Infantry Regiment	Col. L. C. Gause
Price's Division; Brig. Gen. Daniel M. Frost Frost	McRae's Brigade; Brig. Gen. Dandridge McRae	36th Arkansas Infantry Regiment	Col. J. E. Glenn
Price's Division; Brig. Gen. Daniel M. Frost Frost	McRae's Brigade; Brig. Gen. Dandridge McRae	39th Arkansas Infantry Regiment	Col. R. A. Hart
Price's Division; Brig. Gen. Daniel M. Frost Frost	McRae's Brigade; Brig. Gen. Dandridge McRae	3rd Arkansas Field Battery	Capt. John G. Marshall
Price's Division; Brig. Gen. Daniel M. Frost Frost	Parsons's Brigade; Brig. Gen. M. Monroe Parsons	7th Missouri Infantry Regiment	Col. L. M. Lewis
Price's Division; Brig. Gen. Daniel M. Frost Frost	Parsons's Brigade; Brig. Gen. M. Monroe Parsons	8th Missouri Infantry Regiment	Col. S. P. Burns
Price's Division; Brig. Gen. Daniel M. Frost Frost	Parsons's Brigade; Brig. Gen. M. Monroe Parsons	9th Missouri Infantry Regiment	Col. J. D. White
Price's Division; Brig. Gen. Daniel M. Frost Frost	Parsons's Brigade; Brig. Gen. M. Monroe Parsons	10th Missouri Infantry Regiment	Col. A. C. Pickett
Price's Division; Brig. Gen. Daniel M. Frost Frost	Parsons's Brigade; Brig. Gen. M. Monroe Parsons	9th Missouri Sharpshooter Battalion	Maj. L. A. Pindall
Price's Division; Brig. Gen. Daniel M. Frost Frost	Parsons's Brigade; Brig. Gen. M. Monroe Parsons	3rd Missouri Field Battery (4 x 6lb Gun)	Capt. C. B. Tilden
Price's Division; Brig. Gen. Daniel M. Frost Frost	Fagan's Brigade; Brig. Gen. James F. Fagan	6th Arkansas Infantry Regiment	Col. Alexander T. Hawthorn
Price's Division; Brig. Gen. Daniel M. Frost Frost	Fagan's Brigade; Brig. Gen. James F. Fagan	34th Arkansas Infantry Regiment	Col. W. H. Brooks
Price's Division; Brig. Gen. Daniel M. Frost Frost	Fagan's Brigade; Brig. Gen. James F. Fagan	35th Arkansas Infantry Regiment	Col. J. P. King
Price's Division; Brig. Gen. Daniel M. Frost Frost	Fagan's Brigade; Brig. Gen. James F. Fagan	37th Arkansas Infantry Regiment	Maj. T. H. Blacknall
Price's Division; Brig. Gen. Daniel M. Frost Frost	Fagan's Brigade; Brig. Gen. James F. Fagan	7th Arkansas Field Battery	Capt. W. D. Blocker
Price's Division; Brig. Gen. Daniel M. Frost Frost	Clark's Brigade; Col. John B. Clark Jr.	8th Missouri Infantry Regiment	Col. Charles S. Mitchell
Price's Division; Brig. Gen. Daniel M. Frost Frost	Clark's Brigade; Col. John B. Clark Jr.	9th Missouri Infantry Regiment	Lieut. Col. M. W. Buster
Price's Division; Brig. Gen. Daniel M. Frost Frost	Clark's Brigade; Col. John B. Clark Jr.	8th Missouri Infantry Battalion	Lieut. Col. Richard H. Musser
Price's Division; Brig. Gen. Daniel M. Frost Frost	Clark's Brigade; Col. John B. Clark Jr.	1st Missouri Field Battery (2 x 6lb Rifle, 2 x 6lb Gun)	Capt. S. T. Ruffner

== See also ==
- List of orders of battle

== Notes ==
Footnotes

Citations
