= Camp Bragg =

Camp Bragg may refer to:

- Fort Bragg, formerly known as Camp Bragg and Fort Liberty, North Carolina, United States
- Camp Bragg (Arkansas), a Confederate encampment in the American Civil War
