= 36th Arkansas Infantry Regiment =

36th Arkansas Infantry (Confederate)
- Active: 1862–1865
- Country: Confederate States
- Allegiance: Arkansas
- Branch: Army
- Type: Infantry
- Size: Regiment
- Facings: Light blue
- Engagements: American Civil War: Battle of Prairie Grove; Battle of Helena; Little Rock campaign; Battle of Pleasant Hill; Battle of Jenkins Ferry

Commanders
- First Commander: Dandridge McRea
- Second Commander: John Edward Glenn
- Final Commander: James M. Davie

The 36th Arkansas Infantry Regiment (1862–1865) was a Confederate Army regiment during the American Civil War. Originally known as McRea's Emergency Regiment, had been organized as the 28th Arkansas Infantry Regiment. After the Battle of Prairie Grove, the regiment was reorganized and designated the 36th Arkansas Infantry Regiment. The regiment is also referred to as the 2nd Trans-Mississippi Infantry Regiment, Glenn's Regiment, and Davie's Regiment.

== Organization ==
The 36th Arkansas Infantry Regiment was organized on June 26, 1862, as the 28th Arkansas Infantry Regiment, under the command of Colonel Dandridge McRae. The unit was intended to be mounted, but General Thomas Hindman soon ordered it dismounted, along with three other new cavalry regiments. The 36th Infantry would serve in the brigades of Generals McRae, L. C. Gause, and Roane in the Trans-Mississippi Department.

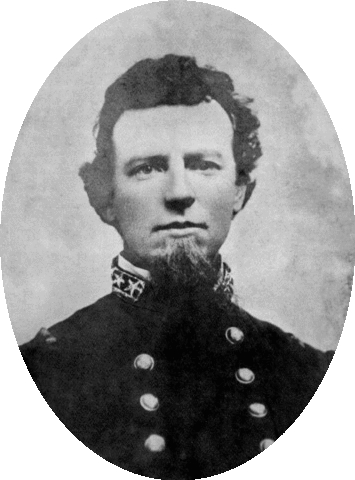
Colonel Dandridge McRae, who had raised the 15th Arkansas Infantry Regiment, was its first commander, when it was known as the 28th Arkansas

The field officers were Colonels McRea, James M. Davie and John E. Glenn, Lieutenant Colonels W. S. Hanna and Walter C. Robinson, and Major Joseph F. Hathaway. The unit was composed of volunteer companies from the following counties:

- Company A, of White County, commanded by Captain James M. Davie. This company contained several former members of the 21st Arkansas Militia Regiment)
- Company B, of White County, commanded by Captain Robert Query. This company contained several former members of the 21st Arkansas Militia Regiment)
- Company C, of Prairie County, commanded by Captain Walter C. Robinson
- Company D, of Van Buren County, commanded by Captain R.L. Norman.
- Company E, of White County, commanded by Captain George W. Lewis. This company contained several former members of the 21st Arkansas Militia Regiment)
- Company F, of Conway County, commanded by Captain John W. Duncan.
- Company G, of Pulaski County, commanded by Captain B.C. Neale. This company included several men from other regiments who had been hospitalized at Little Rock.
- Company H, of White County, commanded by Joseph F. Hathaway.
- Company I, of Conway County, commanded by Captain Isaac H. Johnson.
- Company K, of Pulaski County, commanded by Captain Hugh A. McDonald.

=== Uniforms and Equipment ===
The 28th Arkansas Infantry mustered by companies and conducted its initial training near Fort Smith, Arkansas, on what the locals called the Mazzard Prairie. Initially, the regiment was poorly equipped; however, they were eventually supplied with modern Springfield rifle-muskets that had been captured at the First Battle of Bull Run, Virginia, and transported west. The regiment gained a reputation as some of the most disciplined and martial looking then training on Mazzard Prairie. In the Spring of 1863 the men was issued standard Columbus Depot uniforms, generally made from light-grey jean material with an eight button single breasted frock coat having dark blue trim on its straight stand-up collar and straight cuffs. They also were issued one pair of matching trousers and a simple black felt hat. The regiment's commissioned officers were mostly men of means before to the war, and it is assumed they would have indulged themselves at the many commercial uniform outfitters. The 36th Arkansas's microfilm records include many Quartermaster receipts showing the officers purchased gold braid, coats, silk sashes, white cotton shirts, and large brimmed hats.

== Service ==
=== Prairie Grove Campaign ===
On November 5, 1862, Colonel McRae was promoted to brigadier general and Major John Edward Glenn, who was also a veteran of the Battle of Wilson's Creek, was elected regimental commander. During the Prairie Grove campaign, the 28th Arkansas Infantry was brigaded with the 26th, 32nd, and 30th Arkansas and Marshalls Arkansas Battery. On December 3, 1862, the regiment had a strength of 1042 officers and soldiers. General McRae commanded the brigade, which was assigned to Shoup's Division in Major General Thomas C. Hindman's 1st Corps of the Army of the Trans-Mississippi. The 28th Arkansas saw its first combat on November 28, 1862, at the Battle of Cane Hill. General Hindman described the regiment's actions during the Battle of Prairie Grove December 7, 1862:

Fagan's Arkansas brigade, part of McRae's brigade, and the Missourians, under Shelby, delivered a terrific fire from their shot-guns, rifles, and muskets, and charged the enemy furiously.

The 28th Arkansas delivered a devastating volley on the Union regiments from Wisconsin and Iowa, forcing them to withdraw. McRae's Brigade then charged down the hill sending the surviving Union infantry fleeing to the protection of their artillery which, in turn, fired double canister into the advancing Confederates. Shaken by the massive power of the Federal artillery, the Confederates were forced to withdraw back across the cornfields. The Union infantry charged back up the high ground two more times, resulting in both the 26th Indiana and the 37th Illinois effectively being rendered combat ineffective. The final blow to the Union forces was another counter-attack from Brigadier General McRae's left most regiment, probably the 30th Arkansas, along with all of Fagan's Brigade to the left, which served to secure that portion of the field for the Confederates. In spite of its success on the first day of battle, a lack of ammunition led General Hindman to order a retreat during the night. The 36th Arkansas suffered three killed and two taken prisoner.

=== Redesignated as the 36th Arkansas Infantry Regiment ===
During the general re-organization of the 1st Corps of the Army of the Trans-Mississippi, following the Battle of Prairie Grove, new muster rolls for several of the regiments were sent to the Confederate War Department in Richmond, which assumed that the rolls were for new regiments, and thus assigned new numerical designations, thus the 28th Arkansas Infantry became redesignated as the 36th Arkansas Infantry Regiment.

By the end of February 1863, the 36th Arkansas was encamped at Des Ark with the remainder of its brigade. The brigade's task organization remained the same for the rest of the war: The 32nd Arkansas Infantry Regiment, commanded by Colonel Lucien C. Gause; the 36th Arkansas Infantry Regiment, commended by Colonel James M. Davie; the 30th Arkansas Infantry Regiment, commanded by Colonel J. W. Rogan; and Marshall's Arkansas Battery, commanded by Captain John G. Marshall. In early March 1863, the brigade marched to Camp Bowen, near Little Rock, and took up defensive positions in a portion of the capital's protective ring. Their days were occupied with more drill and working on the earthworks of the defenses. The regiment remained near Little Rock until April 23, 1863, when the regiment crossed the Arkansas River and began a march to Jacksonport, in preparation for the Battle of Helena.

The McRea's Brigade and the 36th Arkansas served in the attack on the federal post at Helena, Arkansas, on July 4, 1863. On July 2, Price's Division, including McRea's Brigade with the 36th Arkansas rendezvoused with Brigadier General Fagan's forces at Lick Creek, west of Helena, and the next morning Generals Holmes, Price, Walker, Fagan, and Marmaduke met in the Allen Polk farmhouse five miles west of Helena to discuss plans for the attack the following day. Holmes issued his general orders outlining the plan of attack on the Union garrison. Price's troops, with his brigades commanded by Brigadier Generals Dandridge McRae and Mosby M. Parsons were to advance by way of the Little Rock Road and attack Battery C atop Graveyard Hill, while Fagan's brigade was to attack Battery D atop Hindman Hill. Confusion in Major General Price's ranks crippled the Confederate attack. Price did not order his troops to resume their march until at least an hour after both Fagan and Marmaduke had begun their attacks. His two brigade commanders, Parsons and McRae, failed to maintain communications with one another and failed to attack, each expecting the order to come from the other. When Price's forces finally regrouped and began their attack, they stormed Graveyard Hill under fire from Batteries B, C, and D. Against Parsons' and McRae's assault, the 33rd Missouri infantry defending Battery C were ordered to spike their guns and retreat, and Graveyard Hill fell to the Confederate advance. Before General Price could have his own artillery moved up from his rear to defend Battery C and fire on Fort Curtis, Prentiss ordered the guns of Batteries A, B, and D, as well as the Tyler's artillery turned on the Confederate enclave. In the confusion, General Holmes disregarded the standard chain of command and ordered one of Parson's regimental commanders to attack Fort Curtis. The other commanders misunderstood and, thinking a general attack order had been issued, joined in the advance down Graveyard Hill, into the murderous crossfire of the Union batteries, the Tyler's artillery, and the reformed Union line. The Confederate assault broke and began to retreat in disorder. General McRae, meanwhile, gathered what men he could of his brigade and led them down the ravine separating Graveyard Hill and Hindman Hill to assist General Fagan's assault on Battery D. The Union defenders opened fire as McRae's troops started to climb Hindman Hill, and the attack collapsed before it had begun. The diversion did enable Fagan to make a charge and take the last line of rifle pits protecting Battery D, but they were unable to take the battery itself. Brigadier General McRae described the efforts of the 36th Infantry in his report as follows:

Major Davie, gallantly leading his men, fell shot through the thigh in front of the fort. Captain Robinson, acting major, fell mortally wounded in front of his men. There also fell Captain Garland, of Glenn's regiment. Colonels Glenn and Gause, and Lieutenant-Colonels Rogan and Hicks, deserve special mention for the cool and daring manner in which they led their men. Lieutenant Crabtree, of Glenn's regiment, displayed the greatest intrepidity. Color-Sergeant Garland, of Glenn's regiment, also deserves special mention. He advanced his regimental colors to the front, and maintained his position through the assault, his colors being torn into ribbons.

The 36th Arkansas lost 27 soldiers killed, 89 captured and 122 wounded during the Battle of Helena, of which the regiment was only able to evacuate 36. Six of those evacuated wounded later died of their wounds. Those that could not be evacuated had to be left, many of whom later died of their wounds after having been taken prisoner by the Federal defenders.

=== Little Rock Campaign ===
The ranks of the 36th Arkansas now began to deteriorate rapidly as soldiers began to desert almost every night as the regiment moved back into camp to defend the state capital. Of the 150 soldiers that the 36th Arkansas' muster rolls report as deserters, the vast majority of these men left the ranks during the weeks that followed their failed assault at Helena. The regiment began to experience a great amount of general unrest which was demonstrated by increasing desertions and poor morale as the summer continued. On 19 August 1863 Captain Hamilton B. Wear, Company I, 36th Arkansas Infantry, was charged and court-martialed for "encouraging desertion" amongst the soldiers. Captain Wear was court-martialed on August 19, 1863, at Camp Bayou Meto. As late as November 20, 1863, Captain Wear was in the guard-house at Camp Bragg, awaiting a review of his court-martial. He was eventually permitted to resign his commission on December 29, 1863. He took the oath of allegiance to the United States on January 18, 1864. With the high number of total losses to the regiment that summer, totaling 233 from 4 July through September 30, 1863, the regiment went through a large internal reorganization. Companies F and I were disbanded completely, Company H was consolidated into Company A, G with B, C with K and D with E. The regiment now consisted of four companies, A through D, and its strength now stood at 710 officers and soldiers as the desertion rate slowed significantly.

By the second week of September 1863, it was clear that the regiment's defense of Little Rock was becoming futile. Major General Price was ordered to leave the city after a failed attempt to plead with the citizens to defend their town. The 36th Arkansas, along with the remainder of Price's Division, had been occupying defensive works five miles on the southeast side of the city and now began to move back across Fourche Bayou along a withdrawal route towards what would become their winter quarters in an encampment near Arkadelphia, Arkansas.

Colonel John Edward Glenn submitted his resignation on September 4, 1863, which was approved on September 18. Lieutenant Colonel James Madison Davie was promoted to colonel of the 36th Arkansas on October 24, 1863. Colonel Davie was still in command as of February 29, 1864, the date of the last known muster roll of the 36th Arkansas.

=== Red River Campaign ===
On 7 November 1863 the regiment built and moved into winter quarters at Camp Sumter near Arkadelphia. The regiment remained in their winter quarters for the next three months with no significant action or contact with the enemy. The regiment left their winter quarters on March 20, 1864, with a strength of 663 soldiers. They were headed south to Shreveport, Louisiana, in order to assist in countering Union General Nathaniel Banks' advance along the Red River. The unit played a limited role in the Battle of Pleasant Hill, Louisiana, as part of the reserve brigade. The regiment sustained four soldiers killed and five captured in several small skirmishes. After the battle the entire Arkansas division was instructed by Major General Price to conduct a forced march back to Arkansas to assist with the second half of the Red River Campaign, Union General Frederick Steele's Camden Expedition. The 36th Arkansas arrived in time to participate in the Battle of Jenkins' Ferry on April 30, 1864. The brigade commander, General Gause described the roll of the 36th Arkansas as follows:

The whole line then moved to the attack, and had not advanced more than 100 yards until the skirmishers were rallied on the brigade and the engagement became general. Only a few volleys had been fired, when I ordered my brigade to charge, which was done in splendid style.

However the two-brigade attack was not sustained for long as troops to the left of the brigade were counter-attacked by Federal troops. There the brigade was ordered to hold their position. Colonel Davie was ordered to change the front of his regiment perpendicular to that of the brigade in order to protect it from a flank attack, but the 36th proved to be too small to protect the brigade from the heavy fire which the federal troops poured on the brigade from that direction. The regiment was ordered to slowly fall back while continuing to protect the right of the brigade. Colonel Gause described what happened next:

This was done in good order, slowly retiring and returning the enemy's fire at every step for about a quarter of a mile, when, being no longer able to protect myself against the rapid movement of the enemy on my left flank, I was compelled to fall back hastily and in some confusion.

However the leadership of the brigade was able to regain control over their troops as they fell back to the relative safety of the Missouri troops that were now holding a firm line. In a short time the brigade was reformed and moving again to the attack. Colonel Gause directed Major Hathaway and Company A, 36th Arkansas forward to conduct a reconnaissance. After capturing seventeen Federal soldiers, Major Hathaway reported to the brigade commander that the Federals had left the field. The one-day battle had cost the regiment three soldiers killed and one wounded.

=== The remainder of the war ===
By the last week of June 1864 the regiment was ordered to report to the garrison commander of the fort defending Camden, Arkansas, to bolster the defensive works of the city. The regiment reported 702 soldiers present on June 28, 1864. All Arkansas regiments were consolidated into one division, designated the Arkansas Division of two infantry brigades, and commanded by Major General Churchill. The First Arkansas brigade, which included the 36th Arkansas, was commanded by Brigadier General John Selden Roane.

On September 30, 1864, the regiment was assigned to Brigadier General John S. Roane's 1st (Arkansas) Brigade, Acting Major General Thomas J. Churchill's 1st (Arkansas) Division, Major General John B. Magruder's Second Army Corps, Army of the Trans-Mississippi and remained in that assignment through December 31, 1864. On 31 December 1864, General Kirby Smith's report on the organization of his forces lists the 36th Arkansas, under the command of Colonel Davie as belonging to Brigadier General John Selden Roane's, 1st Brigade of Acting Major General Thomas J. Churchill's 1st Arkansas Infantry Division of Major General John B. Magruder's 2nd Army Corps, Confederate Army of the Trans-Mississippi.

On 19 January 1865, Roane's Brigade was ordered to move to Fulton, near Washington, in Hempstead County in order to assist with the building of fortifications along the Red River. By late January 1865, the 36th Arkansas was ordered to take up the march along the Shreveport road southwest to Minden Louisiana. By the end of February, the 36th Arkansas had occupied their new winter quarters at Minden when they received an order for the regiment to move to Shreveport in order to link up with the remainder of the Confederate troops in the area that were encamped there. Union commanders in the Department of the Gulf reported on March 20, 1865, that General Roane's brigade was composed of four regiments—Colonel Gause, 250 men; Colonel Hill, 250 men; Colonel Brooks, 250 men; Colonel Davie, 250 men.

On 1 April 1865 the regiment arrived at Shreveport, but their stay was short lived. On April 6 the regiment received another movement order from Major General Churchill which stated that the division would move at sunrise on April 8 towards Marshall, Texas. The 36th Arkansas arrived in Marshall six days later with a reported strength of 598 soldiers having lost one soldier in a skirmish with Federal cavalry, two captured and having to leave behind two soldiers that were too sick to travel any further. At Marshall, they immediately began to construct defenses on the east side of the town. On 11 May 1865 as the work on the town defenses continued, the regiment lost its last three soldiers, all from Company C, captured by Federal cavalry as they were on picket duty. An order from the division commander halted work on the defenses on 14 May without any further details. Those details came twelve days later, on 26 May 1865 when the 36th Arkansas was surrendered with the remainder of General Kirby Smith's army. The strength of the regiment that day was 587 officers and soldiers.

=== Campaign credit ===
36th Arkansas Infantry Regiment took part in the following battles:

- Battle of Helena, Arkansas July 4, 1863.
- Battle of Little Rock, Arkansas September 10, 1863.
- Red River Campaign, Arkansas March–May, 1864.
  - Battle of Pleasant Hill, Louisiana, April 9, 1864.
  - Battle of Jenkins Ferry, Arkansas April 30, 1864.

== Surrender ==
The formal surrender was dated May 26, 1865, at New Orleans. Lieutenant General S.B. Buckner, acting for General E. Kirby Smith, Confederate Commander of the Trans-Mississippi Department, entered into military convention with Federal Major General Peter J. Osterhaus, representing Major General E.R.S. Canby. Under the terms of the surrender all resistance would cease, and officers and men would be paroled under terms similar to those of the Appomattox surrender. General Smith actually approved the convention June 2, 1865, at Galveston, Texas. This surrender agreement required the disbanded Confederate soldiers to report into Federal parole centers set up in key communities in Confederate-held Arkansas, Louisiana, and Texas to be accounted for and to give and receive their final parole. All absentees from units serving east of the Mississippi River who were then in the Trans-Mississippi and had not been paroled east of the Mississippi were also required to report. The 36th Arkansas, along with most of the other Arkansas infantry regiments, was camped around Marshall, Texas, when the Trans-Mississippi Army surrendered. With few exceptions, the Arkansas infantry regiments disbanded at Marshall and went home. A few men stopped off at Shreveport to receive paroles, and a few more were paroled at Pine Bluff; but for the most part, the men simply went home without bothering with paroles. Of the 1104 men who had served in the 36th Arkansas 510 were no longer with them. The regiment had suffered 245 soldiers killed in action or died of disease, another 136 had been captured and 129 had deserted. Forty-six percent of the total number of soldiers that had mustered into the regiment were no longer with the regiment at the end of the war.

== See also ==
- List of Confederate units from Arkansas
- Confederate Units by State

== Bibliography ==
- Bears, Edwin C. "The Battle of Helena, July 4, 1863." Arkansas Historical Quarterly 20 (Autumn 1961): 256–297.
- Christ, Mark K. Civil War Arkansas, 1863: The Battle for a State. Norman: University of Oklahoma Press, 2010.
- Christ, Mark K., ed. Rugged and Sublime: The Civil War in Arkansas. Fayetteville: University of Arkansas Press, 1994.
- Christ, Mark K. "'We Were Badly Whipped': A Confederate Account of the Battle of Helena, July 4, 1863." Arkansas Historical Quarterly 69 (Spring 2010): 44–53.
- Price, Jeffery R. "A Courage And Desperation Rarely Equaled: The 36th Arkansas Infantry Regiment (Confederate States Army), 26 June 1862--25 May 1865". MA thesis, U.S. Army Command and General Staff College, Fort Leavenworth, Kansas, 2003.
- Schieffler, George David. "Too Little, Too Late to Save Vicksburg: The Battle of Helena, Arkansas, July 4, 1863." MA thesis, University of Arkansas, 2005.
