= 9th Missouri Infantry Regiment (disambiguation) =

The 9th Missouri Infantry Regiment was an infantry regiment of the Confederate States Army in the American Civil War.

9th Missouri Infantry Regiment may also refer to:

- 12th Missouri Infantry Regiment (Confederate), a Confederate States Army unit also known as the 9th Missouri Infantry Regiment for a short period
- 59th Illinois Infantry Regiment, a Union unit in the American Civil War originally known as the 9th Missouri Infantry Regiment
