= 8th Missouri Infantry Regiment (Confederate) =

Infantry regiment of the Confederate States Army

8th Missouri Infantry Regiment 7th Missouri Infantry Battalion Mitchell's Missouri Infantry Regiment
- Flag of the pattern originally issued to the regiment
- Active: September 2, 1862 to June 7, 1865
- Allegiance: Confederate States of America
- Branch: Confederate States Army
- Type: Infantry
- Size: 450 (December 7, 1862)
- Engagements: American Civil War: Battle of Prairie Grove; Battle of Pleasant Hill; Battle of Jenkins' Ferry

The 8th Missouri Infantry Regiment was an infantry regiment of the Confederate States Army during the American Civil War. From May 1861, the war began affecting events in the state of Missouri. In 1862, Confederate recruiting activities took place in Missouri, despite that the state never formally joined the Confederacy, and a cavalry regiment was formed in Oregon County, the nucleus being former members of the Missouri State Guard. On September 2, the unit entered Confederate service, but it was reclassified as infantry ten days later. After many of the men transferred to other units, the regiment was reclassified as a battalion on October 19 and named the 7th Missouri Infantry Battalion, also known as Mitchell's Missouri Infantry. It participated in a Confederate offensive at the Battle of Prairie Grove on December 7. During the battle, the unit made several charges against the Union lines but was repeatedly repulsed by artillery fire. The regiment spent most of early 1863 encamped near Little Rock and Pine Bluff in Arkansas.

On July 23, 1863, the unit was officially named the 8th Missouri Infantry Regiment. Later that year, it was part of the abortive Confederate defense of Little Rock before retiring to Camp Bragg near Camden. In March 1864, the regiment was sent south into Louisiana to help defend against the Red River campaign. It was part of a failed attack at the Battle of Pleasant Hill on April 9. After the Union troops involved in the Red River campaign retreated, the 8th Missouri Infantry was sent back to Arkansas, where it pursued the retreating Union soldiers led by Major General Frederick Steele. The regiment took part in a failed attack against Steele on April 30 at the Battle of Jenkins' Ferry. For the remainder of 1864 and the first half of 1865, the unit was stationed at several points in Louisiana and Arkansas. The Confederate Trans-Mississippi Department surrendered on June 2, 1865, and the men of the 8th Missouri Infantry Regiment were paroled on June 7, ending the regiment's military service.

== Background ==
At the time of the 1860 United States Presidential Election, slavery was one of the defining features of Southern culture, and the ideology of states' rights was used to defend the institution. After the election of Abraham Lincoln as president in 1860, such issues came to a head and a movement formed that framed secession as the only way to preserve slavery. On December 20, the state of South Carolina seceded and six others followed in early 1861, thus forming the Confederate States of America on February 4, 1861. (Note: Of the seven seceded states at that time, only six joined the Confederacy on February 4.) On April 12, the American Civil War began with the Battle of Fort Sumter, and four more states soon seceded and joined the Confederacy, bringing it to 11 states. Meanwhile, the state of Missouri was politically divided. The state legislature voted against secession, but Claiborne F. Jackson, the governor of Missouri, supported it. After the pro-Confederate militia threatening the St. Louis Arsenal was dispersed on May 10 at the Camp Jackson affair, a new pro-Confederate militia force – the Missouri State Guard – was formed under the command of Sterling Price, who was appointed as major general. Nathaniel Lyon, a brigadier general in the Union Army, occupied the state capital on June 15, and the Missouri State Guard withdrew to southwestern Missouri.

The Missouri State Guard won several victories in the latter part of 1861, but by the end of the year Union reinforcements restricted them to the southwestern part of the state. On November 3, 1861, Jackson and the pro-secession elements of the state legislature voted to secede and join the Confederate States of America as the Confederate government of Missouri; the anti-secession elements of the legislature had previously voted against secession, leading to the state having both a Union government and a nominal Confederate one. In February 1862, a Union advance led Price to abandon Missouri for Arkansas, where his men, as part of a larger Confederate force, were defeated at the Battle of Pea Ridge on March 7 and 8. The victory gave the Union control of Missouri. Later that year, the Confederates reestablished some presence in Missouri through guerrilla activities and recruiting efforts.

== Service history ==
=== 1862 ===
The 8th Missouri Infantry Regiment's origins began on August 7, 1862, when a group of men, primarily former veterans of the Missouri State Guard, began forming a cavalry unit in Oregon County, Missouri. The unit officially entered Confederate service on September 2, while it was stationed at Evening Shade, Arkansas. Despite entering service as a cavalry unit, Major General Theophilus Holmes, the commander of the Trans-Mississippi Department, ordered that it be converted to an infantry unit on September 12. The same month, the regiment was presented with a war flag of the first Confederate national flag pattern. However, the regiment lost many men because of transfers to other units, necessitating the consolidation of the regiment's component companies down to six and the reclassification of the overall unit as a battalion on October 19. At some point after the classification, the unit was officially redesignated as the 7th Missouri Infantry Battalion. Lieutenant Colonel Charles S. Mitchell commanded the unit.

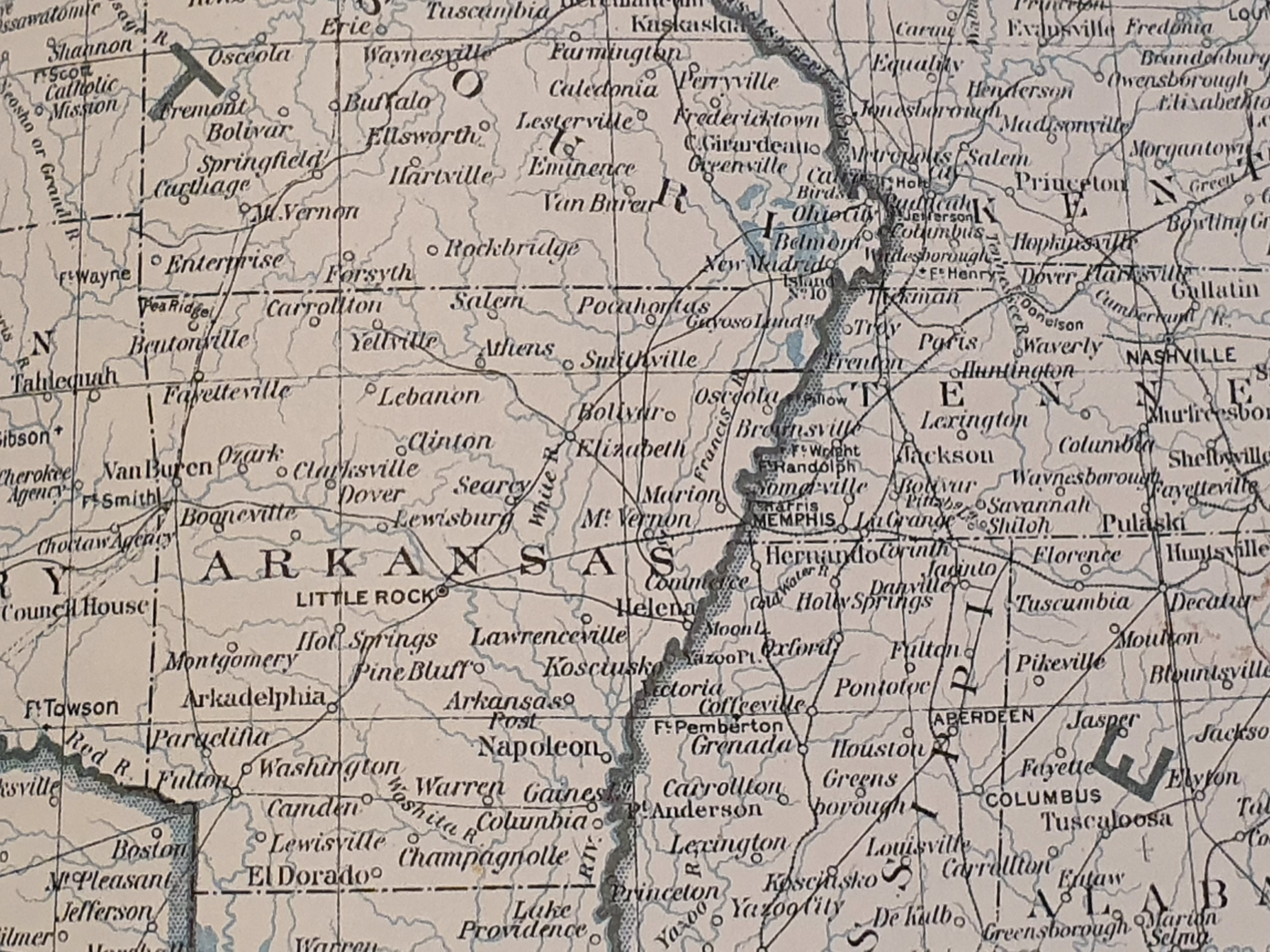
Map of key points in Arkansas, including Van Buren, Little Rock, and Pine Bluff

On October 27, the battalion began moving towards Fort Smith, Arkansas, where a Confederate army was being organized. The unit did not reach the camp of Brigadier General Mosby M. Parsons, to whose brigade the battalion was assigned, until November 28. One day later, three companies from Frazier's Missouri Infantry Battalion – an organization of new recruits formed in October – were added to the 7th Missouri Infantry Battalion; the combined unit was still considered a battalion. The unit was also sometimes known as Mitchell's Missouri Infantry. Confederate forces moved north as part of an advance toward Missouri in late 1862, and when Parsons moved northward in the direction of Prairie Grove on December 3, the battalion accompanied the brigade.

On December 7, 1862, Parsons's brigade saw action at the Battle of Prairie Grove. The Confederate army, commanded by Major General Thomas C. Hindman, had taken up a defensive position awaiting the assault of one wing of the Union army, hoping to defeat that force before the other wing arrived. Early in the fighting, Parsons's brigade was aligned in the position of guarding the Confederate left flank, along with Brigadier General John S. Roane's brigade. The 7th Missouri Infantry Battalion served as Parsons's reserve. Later in the fighting, Parsons's brigade, its commander unwilling to wait for the Union troops to close in with his line, counterattacked Union troops from Brigadier General James G. Blunt's division. Parsons moved Mitchell's unit to the left of his line with the belief that his flank was endangered. Later, Roane detached Clark's Missouri Infantry from his brigade and sent it to Parsons where it was then aligned on Mitchell's left. Artillery fire from the 1st Kansas Battery slowed the momentum of the Confederate attack, but the weight of the Confederate numbers eventually drove the Union line back. Advancing to the new Union line, Mitchell and Clark outflanked the 10th Kansas Infantry Regiment, but again they ran into the 1st Kansas Battery. Two salvos of canister shot halted Mitchell's and Clark's attack, but Parsons's right drove Blunt's line back, thus leading the troops in front of Mitchell to withdraw. Clark and Mitchell attempted to follow up with another attack, but this was quickly driven off by the 1st Kansas Battery and the 10th and 13th Kansas Infantry Regiments. Mitchell's unit had taken 450 men into Prairie Grove; 20 of them became casualties. The night after the battle, the Confederates retreated from the field, eventually reaching Van Buren, Arkansas.

On December 23, men from the companies that had been part of Frazier's unit were amalgamated together to form a tenth company; with ten companies, the unit could again be called a regiment. The ten companies were made up of recruits from Missouri and designated with the letters A–I and K. Mitchell was the unit's colonel, John S. Smizer was its lieutenant colonel, and W. H. L. Frazier, the former commander of Frazier's Missouri Infantry Battalion, was its major.

=== 1863 ===
In January 1863, Parsons's brigade was transferred to Little Rock, Arkansas. On the way, at Clarksville, some of Parsons's units, including Mitchell's Regiment, were detached to form a second brigade, which was either commanded by Brigadier General Daniel M. Frost or Colonel John Bullock Clark Jr. After reaching Little Rock, the regiment went into winter camp. The regiment moved again, via steamboat, on February 7, to a point known as White's Bluff. Less than a month later, it was sent to Fort Pleasant, which was a military installation on the Arkansas River near Pine Bluff. On June 12, Clark's brigade left Fort Pleasant to begin an expedition to the Mississippi River for the purpose of harassing Union Navy shipping. Mitchell's regiment did not take part in the campaign, instead remaining at Fort Pleasant. (Note: One source states that the "8th Missouri Infantry" was engaged in a skirmish near Gaines' Landing on the Mississippi on June 28, but according to historian Ed Bearss, this was actually the 8th Missouri Infantry Battalion.) On July 23, the Confederate States War Department gave Mitchell's regiment the designation of the 8th Missouri Infantry Regiment. This proved problematic as Price had assigned the designation of 8th Missouri Infantry Regiment to Burns' Missouri Infantry Regiment; it was not until later in the year that the Confederate government resolved the duplication by giving Burns's unit another designation.

Later that year, Clark's brigade was transferred from Fort Pleasant back to Little Rock, to build fortifications around the city. Union Major General Frederick Steele was threatening the Confederate defenses in the Little Rock campaign; he outflanked the Confederate fortifications and maneuvered the Confederates out of Little Rock on September 10 without a fight. Clark's brigade retreated to Camp Bragg, which was in the vicinity of Camden. The regiment engaged in no furthernoteworthy actions during the remainder of 1863, and it performed only routine camp duties.

=== 1864–1865 ===
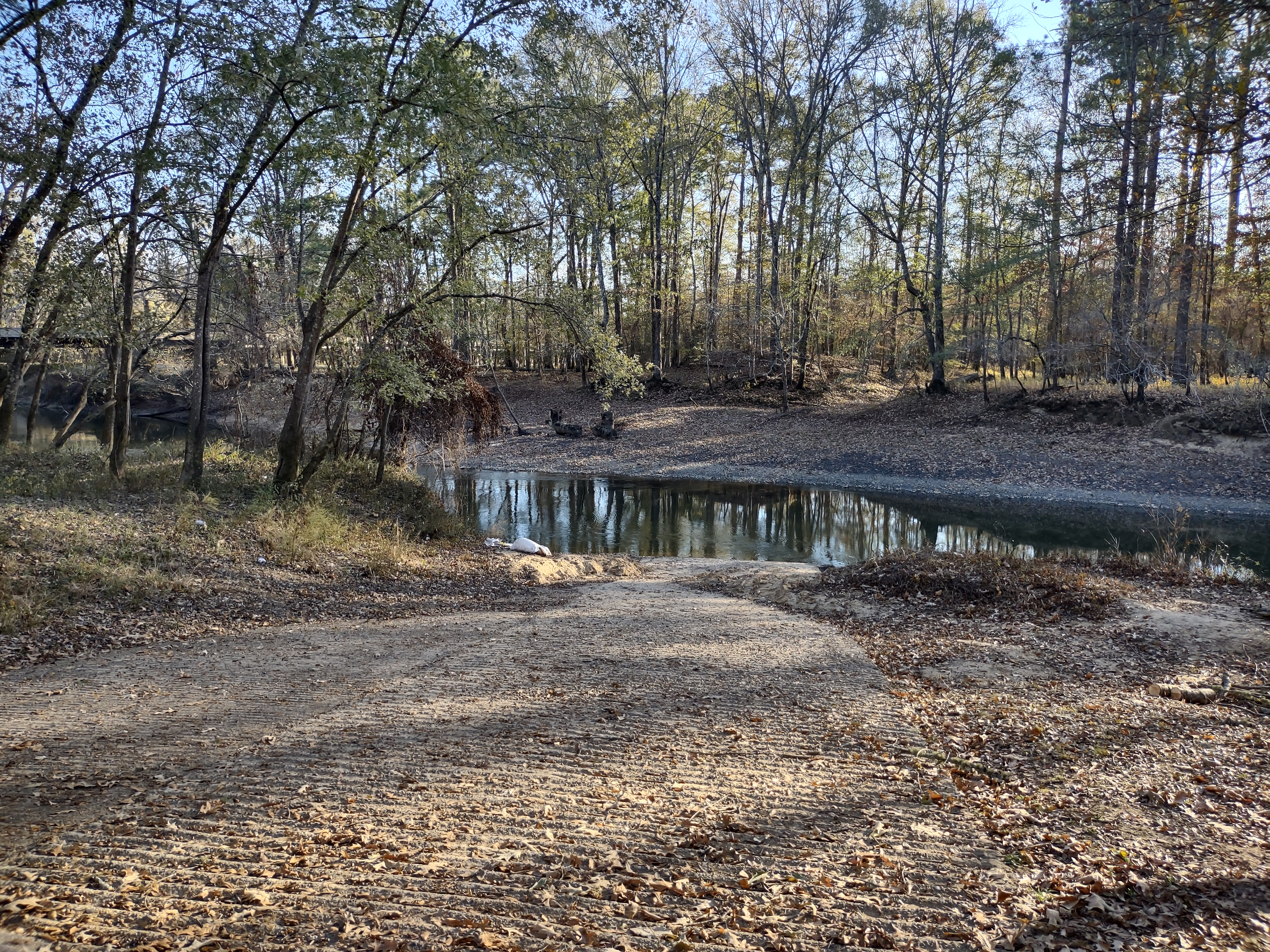
Jenkins' Ferry battlefield

Early in 1864, Union Major General Nathaniel Banks led a force up the Red River with the intent of capturing Shreveport, Louisiana; this offensive constituted the Red River campaign. The 8th Missouri Infantry was then sent into Louisiana to reinforce the Confederates under the command of Major General Richard Taylor who were resisting Banks. By the second half of March, Clark's brigade had reached the Shreveport vicinity. On March 25, by order of the Trans-Mississippi Department, Parsons was elevated to division command; Clark's brigade became part of the new division. The division left Shreveport on April 3 to join Taylor, and it became engaged in the Battle of Pleasant Hill six days later. Banks had halted part of his retreating army to make a stand, and pursuing Confederate troops encountered the Union position.

At the opening of the fighting, Parsons's division held the right of the main Confederate line with Clark's brigade on the right and Colonel Simon P. Burns' brigade on the left. A small cavalry force was positioned to the right of Parsons, although this force's purpose was to exploit a potential breakthrough rather than participate in the planned Confederate attack. Parsons's division and that of Brigadier General James Camp Tappan hit Colonel Lewis Benedict's Union brigade, shattering it in the process. The 58th Illinois Infantry Regiment counterattacked, driving back part of the Confederate right flank. More Union units reentered the fray, and the Confederate right was forced to retreat. The withdrawal began in an orderly fashion, but Parsons's and Tappan's divisions panicked as night fell, and it became a rout. Meanwhile, the Confederates to the left of Parsons and Tappan had failed to make any meaningful progress against Union breastworks, and the battle ended with nightfall. Banks could claim victory as he had repulsed the Confederate attacks, but after consulting with his subordinates he decided to withdraw to Grand Ecore. This decision was made in part because some of Banks' subordinates had lost confidence in him earlier in the campaign; one had even briefly entertained ideas of a mutiny. The 8th Missouri Infantry suffered 76 casualties at Pleasant Hill, including 16 fatalities.

Meanwhile, in Arkansas, Steele occupied Camden on April 15. With Banks out of the way, General Edmund Kirby Smith, commander of the Trans-Mississippi Department, prepared to concentrate his forces against Steele. The Union forces in Camden began running low on food. Two expeditions were sent to forage food from the countryside, but they were defeated at the Battles of Poison Spring and Marks' Mills. With little food remaining and in the knowledge that Banks had retreated, Steele's command left Camden on April 26 with hopes of reaching Little Rock. Smith pursued, and caught up with Steele at the crossing of the Saline River on April 30. The Confederates then attacked, bringing on the Battle of Jenkins' Ferry. Parsons's division arrived on the field at 09:00, but did not fully deploy until 10:00, with Burns on the left and Clark on the right. As Parsons's division moved forward to attack, it was joined by Colonel Lucien C. Gause's brigade, that was to align with Clark. The two brigades, despite maneuvering through thick mud, advanced close to the Union line while being supported by Ruffner's Missouri Battery and Lesueur's Missouri Battery. Clark and Gause assaulted the Union line at a point held by the 2nd Kansas Colored Infantry Regiment. The fighting was relatively even until another Union regiment arrived, that poured enfilade fire into the Confederates' ranks. At this point the brigades of Clark and Gause broke, leaving the batteries unsupported. The 2nd Kansas Colored Infantry then attacked the batteries, capturing three cannon. Further Confederate attacks were defeated, and Steele was able to escape across the Saline, reaching Little Rock on May 2. At Jenkins' Ferry, the 8th Missouri Infantry suffered 29 casualties, including 7 men killed.

Jenkins' Ferry was the regiment's last major action; it spent the rest of the war at camps in Arkansas and Louisiana. In August 1864, Clark was reassigned to command a cavalry unit during Price's Missouri Expedition and Mitchell was advanced to brigade command. The last battle of the war was fought in mid-May, and on June 2, Smith surrendered the Trans-Mississippi Department. The survivors of the 8th Missouri Infantry turned in their weapons and relinquished their flag in Shreveport on June 5, and they were then sent to Alexandria for paroles, which were received on June 7. The men were later shipped back to Missouri via steamboat. Over the course of its existence, 166 men died while serving in the regiment: 25 combat-related deaths and 141 deaths from disease.

== Sources ==
- Bearss, Edwin C. (1991) [1986]. The Campaign for Vicksburg. Vol. III: Unvexed to the Sea. Dayton, Ohio: Morningside Bookshop. ISBN 0-89029-516-6.
- Bearss, Edwin C. (2007) [2006]. Fields of Honor: Pivotal Battles of the Civil War (1st paperback ed.). Washington, D.C.: National Geographic. ISBN 978-1-4262-0093-9.
- Forsyth, Michael J. (2003). The Camden Expedition of 1864. Jefferson, North Carolina: McFarland & Company, Inc. ISBN 0-7864-1554-1.
- Gerteis, Louis S. (2012). The Civil War in Missouri. Columbia, Missouri: University of Missouri Press. ISBN 978-0-8262-1972-5.
- Gurley, Bill (2013). "Mosby Monroe Parsons: Missouri's Forgotten Brigadier". In Schott, Thomas E.; Bergeron, Arthur W.; Hewitt, Lawrence L. (eds.). Confederate Generals in the Trans-Mississippi. Vol. 1. Knoxville, Tennessee: University of Tennessee Press. ISBN 978-1-57233-985-9.
- Gurley, Bill (2015). "Mosby Monroe Parsons: Major General, Murder Victim". In Schott, Thomas E.; Hewitt, Lawrence L. (eds.). Confederate Generals in the Trans-Mississippi. Vol. 2. Knoxville, Tennessee: University of Tennessee Press. ISBN 978-1-62190-124-2.
- Holmes, Richard; Singleton, Charles; Jones, Spencer (2001). The Oxford Companion to Military History. Oxford: Oxford University Press. ISBN 0-19-866209-2.
- Johnson, Ludwell H. (1993) [1958]. Red River Campaign: Politics and Cotton in the Civil War. Kent, Ohio: Kent State University Press. ISBN 0-87338-486-5.
- Kennedy, Frances H., ed. (1998). The Civil War Battlefield Guide (2nd ed.). Boston/New York: Houghton Mifflin. ISBN 978-0-395-74012-5.
- McGhee, James E. (2008). Guide to Missouri Confederate Regiments, 1861–1865. Fayetteville, Arkansas: University of Arkansas Press. ISBN 978-1-55728-870-7.
- Shea, William L. (1998). "Prairie Grove, Arkansas". In Kennedy, Frances H. (ed.). The Civil War Battlefield Guide (2nd ed.). Boston/New York: Houghton Mifflin. pp. 140–144. ISBN 978-0-395-74012-5.
- Shea, William L. (2009). Fields of Blood: The Prairie Grove Campaign. Chapel Hill, North Carolina: University of North Carolina Press. ISBN 978-0-8078-3315-5.
