= Jacob Frolich =

American politician and newspaper publisher (1837–1890)

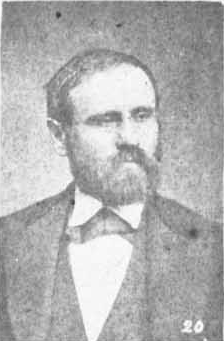

Secretary of State of Arkansas
- In office 1879–1885

Personal details
- Born: November 15, 1837 Oberndorf am Lech, Bavaria, German Confederation
- Died: April 25, 1890 (aged 52) Little Rock, Arkansas, U.S.
- Resting place: Oakland-Fraternal Cemetery, Little Rock, Arkansas, U.S.
- Party: Democratic
- Profession: Newspaper publisher

Jacob Frolich (November 15, 1837 – April 25, 1890) was a Bavarian-born, American politician who served as Arkansas Secretary of State from 1879 to 1885. He served as a colonel in the Confederate States Army during the American Civil War. He was the founder and publisher of the White County Record, a Democratic Party–affiliated newspaper that took a strong stance against Radical Republicans and Reconstruction efforts in Arkansas after the Civil War. He was a leader in the White County, Arkansas, branch of the Ku Klux Klan and was indicted for the murder of an agent of the Arkansas Governor Powell Clayton who was investigating Klan activity in White County. He fled to Canada to avoid arrest but returned a year later to face trial and was acquitted of the crime.

He served as assistant secretary of the Arkansas Senate in 1874 and chief secretary in 1878. He served as Adjutant general in the Arkansas militia from 1877 to 1879. He worked in the Grover Cleveland administration as chief clerk of the Mineral Division of the Interior Department and as chief financial clerk of the Patent Office.

== Early life and military service ==
Jacob Frolich was born on November 15, 1837, in Oberndorf am Lech, Bavaria, to John Frolich and Marie Elizabeth Herrman. He emigrated to the United States with his family and they lived in New Orleans and other locations before they settled in Searcy, Arkansas. At the age of 14, he worked as a printer for several years in Evansville, Indiana, St. Louis and New Orleans. He worked as a clerk in a mercantile business in New Orleans for several years. He returned to the printing business and worked in Baton Rouge and other locations in Louisiana.

He served in the Confederate States Army during the American Civil War in special service with the Army of Tennessee and with the Washington Artillery of New Orleans. He was wounded several times and was promoted to Colonel. His unit surrendered on May 1, 1865, at Augusta, Georgia.

== Career ==
After the war Frolich worked at The Memphis Appeal newspaper in Memphis, Tennessee. He saved up money to purchase printing equipment and moved back to Searcy. In 1866, he founded the White County Record newspaper. It was a Democratic Party–affiliated paper and had a strong stance against Radical Republicans and Reconstruction efforts in Arkansas after the Civil War. After an argument with the editor of the Little Rock Republican he printed that he was "ready, willing and waiting to go hanging, shooting or roasting, provided the occasion offers the editor of the Republican as a victim."

He purchased Curran Hall in Little Rock. He was under scrutiny from the Radical Republican government and Frolich set up trap doors and hiding places in the building in case it was raided. He sold the house in 1881.

Frolich and several other men, including Dandridge McRae, were indicted for the 1868 murder of Albert Parker, an agent of Arkansas Governor Powell Clayton sent to investigate Klan activity in White County. Frolich was the Grand Giant of the Ku Klux Klan for White County. Parker had been sent as an undercover agent to White County to investigate the Klan's role in the death of a black leader and the attempted assassination of a state senator. Parker was killed in October 1868 by the order of Dandridge and Frolich. Parker's body was dumped in a well and was not discovered until March 1870. A warrant with no bail was issued for the arrest of Frolich, Dandridge and several other men involved in the murder. Frolich fled to Canada and worked as a printer in Windsor, Ontario, for a year. Governor Clayton offered a $1,000 bounty for his arrest. He returned to Arkansas in June 1871, when bail was offered. He demanded a trial and was acquitted when the prosecutor was unable to produce evidence.

In 1874, he was elected as assistant secretary of the state Senate and as chief secretary of the state Senate in 1878. He served in the Arkansas Militia and as adjutant general from April 8, 1877, to 1879. He served as Secretary of State of Arkansas for three terms, from 1879 to 1885. He implemented improvements to the Arkansas State House including updating the gate, removing barracks, and acquiring portraits of famous Arkansans.

Frolich moved to Washington, D.C., and worked in the Grover Cleveland administration as chief clerk of the Mineral Division of the Interior Department and as chief financial clerk of the Patent Office. He returned to Arkansas in 1889 and worked as business manager for the Arkansas Gazette newspaper. He left the Gazette in 1890 and worked for the J.H. Sannoner & Co. mercantile business. He declared himself a candidate for state treasurer but died prior to the election.

He died in Little Rock on April 25, 1890, and was interred at Oakland Cemetery in Little Rock.

== Personal life ==
Frolich married Mollie Gaines Finley on September 2, 1869, and they had three children.
