= 30th Arkansas Infantry Regiment =

30th Arkansas Infantry
- Active: 1862–1865
- Disbanded: May 26, 1865
- Country: Confederate States of America
- Allegiance: CSA
- Branch: Infantry
- Size: Regiment
- Engagements: American Civil War: Battle of Prairie Grove; Battle of Helena; Battle of Little Rock; Red River Campaign; Battle of Pleasant Hill; Battle of Jenkins Ferry; Price's Missouri Raid; Battle of Fort Davidson; Fourth Battle of Boonville; Battle of Glasgow, Missouri; Battle of Sedalia; Second Battle of Lexington; Battle of Little Blue River; Second Battle of Independence; Battle of Byram's Ford; Battle of Westport; Battle of Marais des Cygnes; Battle of Mine Creek; Battle of Marmiton River; Second Battle of Newtonia

The 30th Arkansas Infantry (1862–1865) was a Confederate Army infantry regiment during the American Civil War. This regiment was also called the 5th Arkansas Cavalry, the 5th Trans-Mississippi Regiment or 39th Regiment after April, 1863. This regiment was converted to mounted infantry for Price's Missouri Expedition in 1864 and was known as Rogan's Arkansas Cavalry. There were two regiments officially designated as the 30th Arkansas Infantry. The other 30th Arkansas served east of the Mississippi River and was redesignated as the 25th Arkansas Infantry.

== Organization ==
30th Infantry Regiment was formed on June 18, 1862, with Colonel Archibald J. McNeill as the original commander. The unit was raised as a mounted infantry or cavalry regiment and was originally designated as the 5th Arkansas Cavalry.

In early June 1862 Major McNeill was ordered by Major General Hindman to Crowley's Ridge to conscript roving and unattached companies. The state was facing an invasion in the aftermath of the defeat of General Earl Van Dorn at the Battle of Pea Ridge. Immediately following the battle, General Van Dorn and his Army of the West had been ordered to the east side of the Mississippi to support what would become the Battle of Shiloh. General Van Dorn had stripped the State of Arkansas of all organized units and supplies. General Hindman was placed in command of the new Department of the Trans-Mississippi and began organizing a new army. General Hindman's guidance to Major McNeill and others attempting to organize new regiments in Northeast Arkansas in the face of an imminent invasion threat was to organize rapidly and put each company in the field as soon as completed and attack the enemy.

By June 13, 1862, Major McNeill reported from Madison to General Hindman:

I found no organization at all here. I think I will have three companies in this county in ten days. I start for the upper part of my district to organize it, in the morning, which is in a better shape of organization. I have sent a scouting party toward Memphis to burn the boats on Blackfish River and ascertain the position of the enemy. I will not leave a stone unturned.

The companies which Major McNeill found and began to organize into a regiment were originally mounted. By June 18, 1862, Major McNeil reported the companies organized under authority given him to raise a regiment. On August 8, 1862, in Special Orders 60, Army of the South West, General Hindman appointed Major A. J. McNeill as commander of McNeill's Regiment of Arkansas Infantry with date of rank to June 18, 1862, the date that McNeill first reported the formation of his regiment. Companies continued to be added to McNeill's command through the summer, but by July 10, 1862, General Hindman had ordered McNeill's command dismounted and its horses sent home.

Major General Hindman, in a report of his activities in the Trans-Mississippi Department during the period May 31 to November 3, 1862, dated Richmond, Va., June 19, 1863, said, "The scarcity of supplies now caused great distress. Nearly two months must yet elapse before the new crop would ripen. To lessen the consumption of corn, I found it necessary to dismount four regiments of Texans and three of Arkansians. This produced much dissatisfaction, and there were many desertions in consequence." Colonel McNeill's regiment was one of those which were dismounted. There is little information about the regiment when it was first organized as cavalry. The unit was originally a "heavy regiment" composed of fourteen companies from the following counties:

- Company A – Commanded by Captain Cobb, Organized in April, 1862 at Oak Bluff, Green (now Clay) County.
- Company B – Commanded by Captain Cameron N. Biscoe, Organized June, 1862 at Wittsburg, Cross County.
- Company C – Commanded by Unknown, Organized June 20, 1662, at Madison, St. Francis County.
- Company D – Commanded by Captain Michael S. Fielder, Organized June 20, 1862, at Pineville, Arkansas and consisted of troops from both Poinsett and Cross Counties.
- Company E – Commanded by Captain M. J. Clay, Organized June 14, 1962, at Little Rock, Pulaski County, also known as Clay's Cavalry.
- Company F – Commanded by Captain John L. Kuykendall, Organized at Gainesville, Greene County in November 1861 in response to a request for Militia by Colonel Solon Borland. Company was reorganized in July 1862.
- Company G – Commanded by F. M. Prewett, Organized on June 17, 1862, at Mt Vernon, Pulaski (now Faulkner) County.
- Company H – Commanded by Captain Green D. Byers, Organized on July 10, 1862, at Jonesboro, Craighead County.
- Old Company I – Commanded by Captain James H. McGehee, was transferred to Major Chrisman's Arkansas Cavalry Battalion and subsequently assigned as Company C of Dobbins' 1st Arkansas Cavalry Regiment.
- New Company I – Commanded by Captain Mitchel A. Adair, Organized on July 2, 1862, at Jonesboro, Craighead County.
- Company K – Commanded by Captain Unknown, Organized on August 1, 1862, at Jacksonport, Jackson County.
- Company L – Organized at Oak Bluff, in Green (currently Clay) County by Captain E. M. Allen in April 1862. Allen was discharged from the service on September 8, 1862, due to rheumatism. Company L was disbanded on the same date and its members were distributed among the companies, most of them going to Company A.
- Company M – Commanded by Captain James F. Hunter, was consolidated with Captain Bisco's Company B on September 8, 1862.
- Company N – Unknown.
- Company O – Unknown.

The original regimental officers were:

- McNeill, Archibald J. Colonel
- Cobbs, Paul M. Lieutenant Colonel
- Martin, Joseph C. Major
- Barton, James V. 1lt – Quartermaster
- Crump, B.M. Capt – Assistant Commissary
- Gurley, John R, – Quartermaster Sergeant
- Rector, William F. 1lt – Adjutant
- Izard, J. Ordnance Sergeant
- Headley, Alexander M. Surgeon
- Dye, Thomas J. Assistant Surgeon

Colonel Archibald J. McNeill resigned on November 12, 1862; was succeeded by Col. Robert A. Hart, who died of wounds received at the Battle of Helena on August 6, 1863; and was succeeded by Col. James W. Rogan. The remaining field officers were Lieutenant Colonels G. W. Baldwin and Paul M. Cobbs; and Majors Martin Dawson and Joseph C. Martin.

== Service ==
=== Prairie Grove Campaign ===
The 30th spent the late summer to early fall of 1862 on outpost duty along the White River. The unit was stationed at Fort Hindman near DeVall's Bluff, and at Camp Hope/Camp Nelson, which served as a forward base camp for the units manning the White River line. They then marched north to Van Buren, where they were assigned (along with the 26th, 28th, and 32nd Arkansas) to form a brigade under Colonel Dandridge McRae in Brigadier General Francis A. Shoup's Division of Major General Thomas C. Hindman's 1st Corps of the Army of the Trans-Mississippi. McRae's Brigade fought in the Battle of Prairie Grove on December 7–8, 1862. Regimental strength of the 30th Arkansas at Prairie Grove was 304 rifles.

Following the Battle of Prairie Grove, the 30th spent the winter of 1863 in Little Rock, having arrived there in late January 1863, after the retreat from Van Buren.

=== Helena Campaign ===
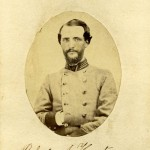
Colonel Robert A. Hart 30th Arkansas

The regiment fought in the Battle of Helena as part of McRea's Brigade. On July 2, Price's, including McRea's Brigade with the 30th Arkansas rendezvoused with Brigadier General Fagan's forces at Lick Creek, west of Helena, and the next morning Generals Holmes, Price, Walker, Fagan, and Marmaduke met in the Allen Polk farmhouse five miles west of Helena to discuss plans for the attack the following day. Holmes issued his general orders outlining the plan of attack on the Union garrison. Price's troops, with his brigades commanded by Brigadier Generals Dandridge McRae and Mosby M. Parsons were to advance by way of the Little Rock Road and attack Battery C atop Graveyard Hill, while Fagan's brigade was to attack Battery D atop Hindman Hill. Confusion in Major General Price's ranks crippled the Confederate attack. Price did not order his troops to resume their march until at least an hour after both Fagan and Marmaduke had begun their attacks. His two brigade commanders, Parsons and McRae, failed to maintain communications with one another and failed to attack, each expecting the order to come from the other. When Price's forces finally regrouped and began their attack, they stormed Graveyard Hill under fire from Batteries B, C, and D. Against Parsons' and McRae's assault, the 33rd Missouri infantry defending Battery C were ordered to spike their guns and retreat, and Graveyard Hill fell to the Confederate advance. Before General Price could have his own artillery moved up from his rear to defend Battery C and fire on Fort Curtis, Prentiss ordered the guns of Batteries A, B, and D, as well as the Tyler's artillery turned on the Confederate enclave. In the confusion, General Holmes disregarded the standard chain of command and ordered one of Parson's regimental commanders to attack Fort Curtis. The other commanders misunderstood and, thinking a general attack order had been issued, joined in the advance down Graveyard Hill, into the murderous crossfire of the Union batteries, the Tyler's artillery, and the reformed Union line. The Confederate assault broke and began to retreat in disorder. General McRae, meanwhile, gathered what men he could of his brigade and led them down the ravine separating Graveyard Hill and Hindman Hill to assist General Fagan's assault on Battery D. The Union defenders opened fire as McRae's troops started to climb Hindman Hill, and the attack collapsed before it had begun. The diversion did enable Fagan to make a charge and take the last line of rifle pits protecting Battery D, but they were unable to take the battery itself. The 30th Arkansas suffered a total of 8 killed, 46 wounded and 39 missing casualties at Helena. The regiment's Colonel R.A. Hart, along with his Major and Adjutant were all mortally wounded in the engagement. Lieutenant Colonel J.W. Rogan assumed command when Colonel Hart was wounded. Colonel Rogan would remain in command for the rest of the war.

=== Little Rock Campaign ===
The unit was present with McRea's Brigade during the Little Rock Campaign in August and September 1863, but was not engaged in the fighting. The Union advance upon Little Rock was opposed mainly by the Confederate cavalry divisions of Generals Marmaduke and Walker. The Confederate infantry brigades were dug in on the north side of the Arkansas River. According to Captain Ethan Allen Pinnell of the Eighth Missouri Infantry, "Our works extend from the Arkansas river two miles below the city. to the eastern part of Crystal Hill, a distance of 6 miles. Gen'l Fagan's Brig. is on the extreme right, Parson's on Fagan's left, Frost in the center and McRea's on the left." The Union forces established a pontoon bridge near Bayou Fourche, and crossed to the south side of the very low Arkansas River. With his works on the north side of the river now flanked, Major General Price was forced to abandon the city on September 10, after a brief engagement at Bayou Fourche. Price's Army withdrew in the direction of Rockport. After Little Rock fell to Union forces on September 10, 1863, the regiment retreated with General Price into southwestern Arkansas. The regiment, along with the other regiments in McRea's brigade, experienced a spike in desertions following the fall of Little Rock. This eventually led to Brigadier General McRea and several of his officers being detached from the army and sent into Northeast Arkansas to try to re-call troops to their units:

SEARCEY, ARK., Nov. 12, 1895.

When the Federal General Steele advanced upon Little Rock in September, 1863, I was in command of an infantry brigade of Arkansas troops in the Confederate States service at that point. Upon the capture of Little Rock by the Federals, they obtained possession of the Arkansas River valley. together with all of that portion of the state lying north of that river. This fact vas fully understood by the rank and file of the Arkansas troops, a large proportion of whom resided in that part of the state. They had anticipated that General Holmes mould make a stand at Little Rock and make an effort to retain possession of that place, and in such anticipation the ranks of the Arkansas regimente were unusually full.

When the order to retreat mas made, and the army learned that the country in which mere their families was to be given up without an effort to retain it, it produced intense indignation, resulting in great demoralization, and the men in great numbers abandoned their colors and returned home. Comparatively few deserted to the Federals. Three of my regiments had been recruited in north Arkansas, and from the above cause my loss was great, much greater than it would have been had a battle been fought.

General Holmes retreated to Arkadelphia, where he halted his command. Reporting to him my losses, and that the men had not deserted to the enemy but had returned home, he directed me to consolidate the companies and regiments of my command, and with the supernumerary officers left without a command, by reason of such consolidation, to proceed to northeast Arkansas, and to assume command over that portion of the state lying between White and Mississippi rivers, and collect and return to their commands all absentees found in that section.

— Statement of Brigadier-General Dandridge McRae.

Due to the high number of desertions in its ranks, the 30th Arkansas regiment was consolidated with the 32nd Arkansas in December 1863. Gause's Brigade spent the winter of 1863 camped southwest of Little Rock.

=== Red River Campaign ===
When the Union army launched its Red River Campaign, seizing Alexandria, Louisiana and moving on Natchitoches and Shreveport, General Churchill's Arkansas Infantry Division, including Gause's Brigade and the 30th/32nd Arkansas was sent south to Shreveport, Louisiana, in early March, 1864 to assist General Kirby Smith's army in countering Union General Nathaniel Banks' advance along the Red River. Churchill's division reached Keatchie, Louisiana, in time to support Richard Taylor's main force who routed Banks' army in the Battle of Mansfield (Sabine Crossroads) on April 8, 1864. The next day, the Confederate forces united to attack the Union rear guard at Pleasant Hill on the afternoon of April 9. The Confederates had endured a long forced march from south central Arkansas to Mansfield, and another of ten hours to Pleasant Hill that day with only two hours' rest. The Union troops held a formidable position, and although the Arkansans and Missourians fought valiantly, they were repulsed and retreated six miles to the nearest water.

After the battle of Pleasant Hill, Churchill's Division made a hasty return with General Kirby Smith back to Arkansas to assist General Price in dealing with the other half of the Red River campaign, Union General Frederick Steele's Camden Expedition moving southwest from Little Rock. The Division and Gause's Brigade arrived just in time to join the pursuit of Steele's army as it retreated from Camden, and join in the attack on Steele as he tried to cross the Saline River at Jenkins' Ferry on April 30, 1864. After an all-night march through a rainstorm and ankle-deep mud, Gause's Brigade fell upon the federal rear guard and drove them for more than a mile, until the brigade on their flank began to give way. Reinforced by Tappan's Brigade, and personally led by General Churchill, the Confederate forces made repeated attacks on Steele's army.

After the Camden Expedition, part of the regiment under Colonel Rogan was reorganized and mounted, and moved with General Sterling Price on his raid on Missouri. During Price's Raid the unit was referred to a Rogan's Arkansas Cavalry and was assigned to Fagan's division of Arkansas Troops.

=== Close of the war ===
After the Red River Campaign, Brigadier General John S. Roane assumed command of Gause's Brigade. The 30th Arkansas continued to be reported as an element of Roane's Brigade, of Churchill's Division, the Department of the Trans-Mississippi until the close of the war. It appears that the consolidated 30th/32nd Arkansas was under the command of Lieutenant Colonel Hicks of the 32nd while Colonel Rogan was involved in mounted operations with General Price.

On September 30, 1864, the regiment was assigned to Brigadier General John S. Roane's 1st (Arkansas) Brigade, Acting Major General Thomas J. Churchill's 1st (Arkansas) Division, Major General John B. Magruder's Second Army Corps, Army of the Trans-Mississippi and remained in that assignment through December 31, 1864. On 31 December 1864, General Kirby Smith's report on the organization of his forces lists the 30th Arkansas, under the command of Colonel James W. Rogan as belonging to Brigadier General John Selden Roane's, 1st Brigade of Acting Major General Thomas J. Churchill's 1st Arkansas Infantry Division of Major General John B. Magruder's 2nd Army Corps, Confederate Army of the Trans-Mississippi.

Roane's Brigade was ordered to move to Fulton, near Washington, in Hempstead County on 19 January 1865 in order to assist with the building of fortifications along the Red River. On 22 January 1865, Major General Churchill was ordered to move his division to Minden, Louisiana, and occupy winter quarters. The brigade was then ordered to move to Minden, Louisiana, on 26 January 1865 where they established winter quarters. Lieutenant Colonel William Hicks resigned February 1, 1865, to become State Senator.

Union commanders in the Department of the Gulf shared a report on March 20, 1865, that General Roane's brigade and the balance of Churchill's Division, except for Shaver's regiment was located at Minden, Louisiana. By 1 April 1865, elements of Roane's Brigade had been ordered to Shreveport Louisiana, and then a week later were ordered to move to Marshall Texas. The brigade was at Marshall, Texas, when the surrender occurred.

=== Campaign Credit ===
The 30th Arkansas Infantry Regiment took part in the following battles:

- Battle of Prairie Grove, Arkansas, December 7, 1862.
- Battle of Helena, Arkansas, July 4, 1863.
- Battle of Little Rock, Arkansas, September 10, 1863.
- Red River Campaign, Arkansas March–May, 1864.
  - Battle of Pleasant Hill, Louisiana, April 9, 1864.
  - Battle of Jenkins Ferry, Arkansas, April 30, 1864.
- Price's Missouri Raid, Arkansas-Missouri-Kansas, September–October, 1864.
  - Battle of Fort Davidson, Missouri, September 27, 1864.
  - Fourth Battle of Boonville, Missouri, October 11, 1864.
  - Battle of Glasgow, Missouri, October 15, 1864.
  - Battle of Sedalia, Missouri, October 15, 1864.
  - Second Battle of Lexington, Missouri, October 19, 1864.
  - Battle of Little Blue River, Missouri, October 21, 1864.
  - Second Battle of Independence, Missouri, October 21–22, 1864.
  - Battle of Byram's Ford, Missouri, October 22–23, 1864.
  - Battle of Westport, Missouri, October 23, 1864.
  - Battle of Marais des Cygnes, Linn County, Kansas, October 25, 1864.
  - Battle of Mine Creek, Missouri, October 25, 1864.
  - Battle of Marmiton River, Missouri, October 25, 1864.
  - Second Battle of Newtonia, Missouri, October 28, 1864.

== Surrender ==
This regiment remained in service in southwestern Arkansas until surrendered with Major General Kirby Smith's army of the Trans-Mississippi, on May 26, 1865. With few exceptions, the Arkansas Infantry regiments in the Trans-Mississippi simply disbanded without formally surrendering. When the Trans-Mississippi Department surrendered, all of the Arkansas infantry regiments were encamped in and around Marshall, Texas (war-ravaged Arkansas no longer able to subsist the army). The regiments were ordered to report to Shreveport, Louisiana, to be paroled but none of them did so. Some individual soldiers went to Shreveport on their own to be paroled, others reported to Union garrisons at Fort Smith, Pine Bluff or Little Rock to receive their paroles, but for the most part, the men simply went home.

== Bibliography ==
- Bears, Edwin C. "The Battle of Helena, July 4, 1863." Arkansas Historical Quarterly 20 (Autumn 1961): 256–297.
- Christ, Mark K. Civil War Arkansas, 1863: The Battle for a State. Norman: University of Oklahoma Press, 2010.
- Christ, Mark K., ed. Rugged and Sublime: The Civil War in Arkansas. Fayetteville: University of Arkansas Press, 1994.
- Christ, Mark K. "'We Were Badly Whipped': A Confederate Account of the Battle of Helena, July 4, 1863." Arkansas Historical Quarterly 69 (Spring 2010): 44–53.
- Hess. Earl J.; Shea, William L.; Piston, William G.; Hatcher, Richard W.: Wilson's Creek, Pea Ridge, and Prairie Grove: A Battlefield Guide, with a Section on Wire Road, Lincoln, Nebraska, U.S.A. Bison Books 2006, ISBN 978-0-8032-7366-5.
- Schieffler, George David. "Too Little, Too Late to Save Vicksburg: The Battle of Helena, Arkansas, July 4, 1863." MA thesis, University of Arkansas, 2005.
- Shea, William L. Fields of Blood: The Prairie Grove Campaign. Chapel Hill: University of North Carolina Press, 2009. ISBN 978-0-8078-3315-5.

== See also ==
- List of Confederate units from Arkansas
- Confederate Units by State
