= 1st Missouri Field Battery =

Unit of the Confederate States Army

1st Missouri Field Battery; Roberts' Missouri Battery; Ruffner's Missouri Battery
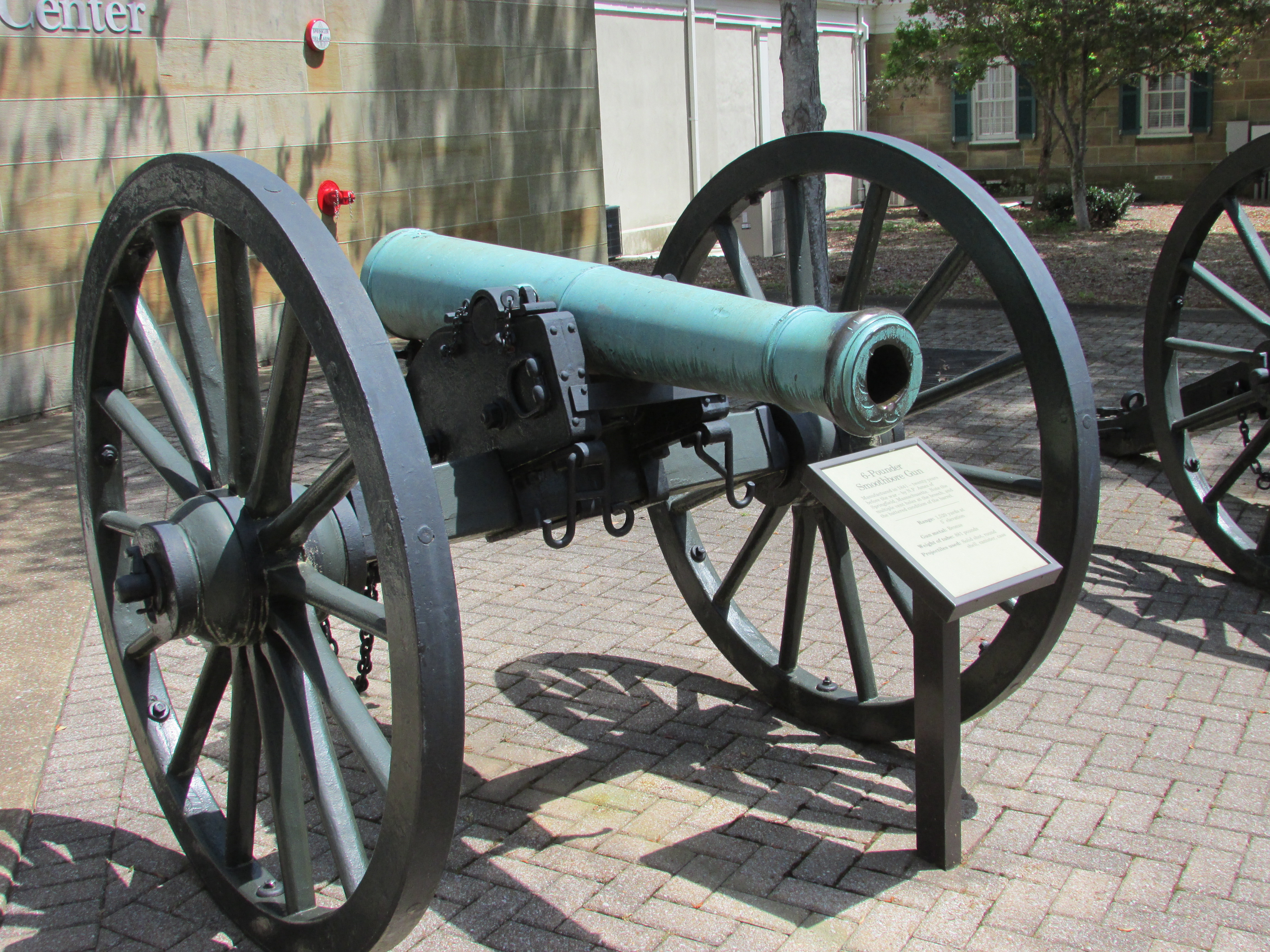
- A 6-pounder smoothbore gun of the type issued to the battery
- Active: c. September 7, 1862 to June 7, 1865
- Allegiance: Confederate States
- Branch: Confederate States Army
- Type: Artillery
- Engagements: American Civil War; Battle of Prairie Grove; Battle of Pine Bluff; Battle of Jenkins' Ferry

The 1st Missouri Field Battery was a field artillery battery that served in the Confederate States Army during the American Civil War. The battery was formed by Captain Westley F. Roberts in Arkansas in September 1862 as Roberts' Missouri Battery and was originally armed with two 12-pounder James rifles and two 6-pounder smoothbore guns. The unit fought in the Battle of Prairie Grove on December 7, as part of a Confederate offensive. Roberts' Battery withdrew after the battle and transferred to Little Rock, Arkansas, where Roberts resigned and was replaced by Lieutenant Samuel T. Ruffner.

During the middle of 1863, the unit, as Ruffner's Missouri Battery, was part of a force sent to the Mississippi River under the command of Colonel John Bullock Clark Jr., with the intent of harassing Union shipping. Clark's force was eventually recalled to Little Rock, which was being threatened by the Union Army of Arkansas under Major General Frederick Steele. The Confederates abandoned Little Rock on September 10, and Ruffner's Battery saw action during the retreat as part of the rear guard. After the retreat from Little Rock, Ruffner's Battery was temporarily assigned to Brigadier General John S. Marmaduke's cavalry division. The battery accompanied Marmaduke in an expedition against the Union garrison of Pine Bluff, Arkansas, seeing action at the Battle of Pine Bluff on October 25.

The unit's assignment to Marmaduke's division ended in December, after which it received a new set of cannons: two 10-pounder Parrott rifles and two 12-pounder howitzers. In early 1864, it became part of Brigadier General Mosby M. Parsons's division, which was ordered into Louisiana in April to counter a Union thrust up the Red River. While Parsons's infantry fought at the Battle of Pleasant Hill on April 9, Ruffner's Battery served in a reserve role and was not engaged. The Union troops present at Pleasant Hill continued to retreat back down the river, so Parsons was returned to Arkansas to move against Steele's Camden expedition. Supply issues forced Steele to retreat from Camden, Arkansas, and the Union troops were pursued to the Saline River. On April 30, the Confederates caught up with Steele at the river crossing and attacked, starting the Battle of Jenkins' Ferry. Ruffner's Battery, along with Lesueur's Missouri Battery, supported an infantry assault, but moved to an exposed position in the process. A Union counterattack captured several of Ruffner's Battery's cannons and Steele's men escaped across the river that night. The battery was then rearmed with four 6-pounder smoothbores.

In November 1864, the unit was given the official designation of the 1st Missouri Field Battery. It spent the remainder of the war in Louisiana and Arkansas and was paroled on June 7, 1865, at Alexandria, Louisiana, after General Edmund Kirby Smith signed surrender terms for the Confederate Trans-Mississippi Department on June 2.

== Background and formation ==
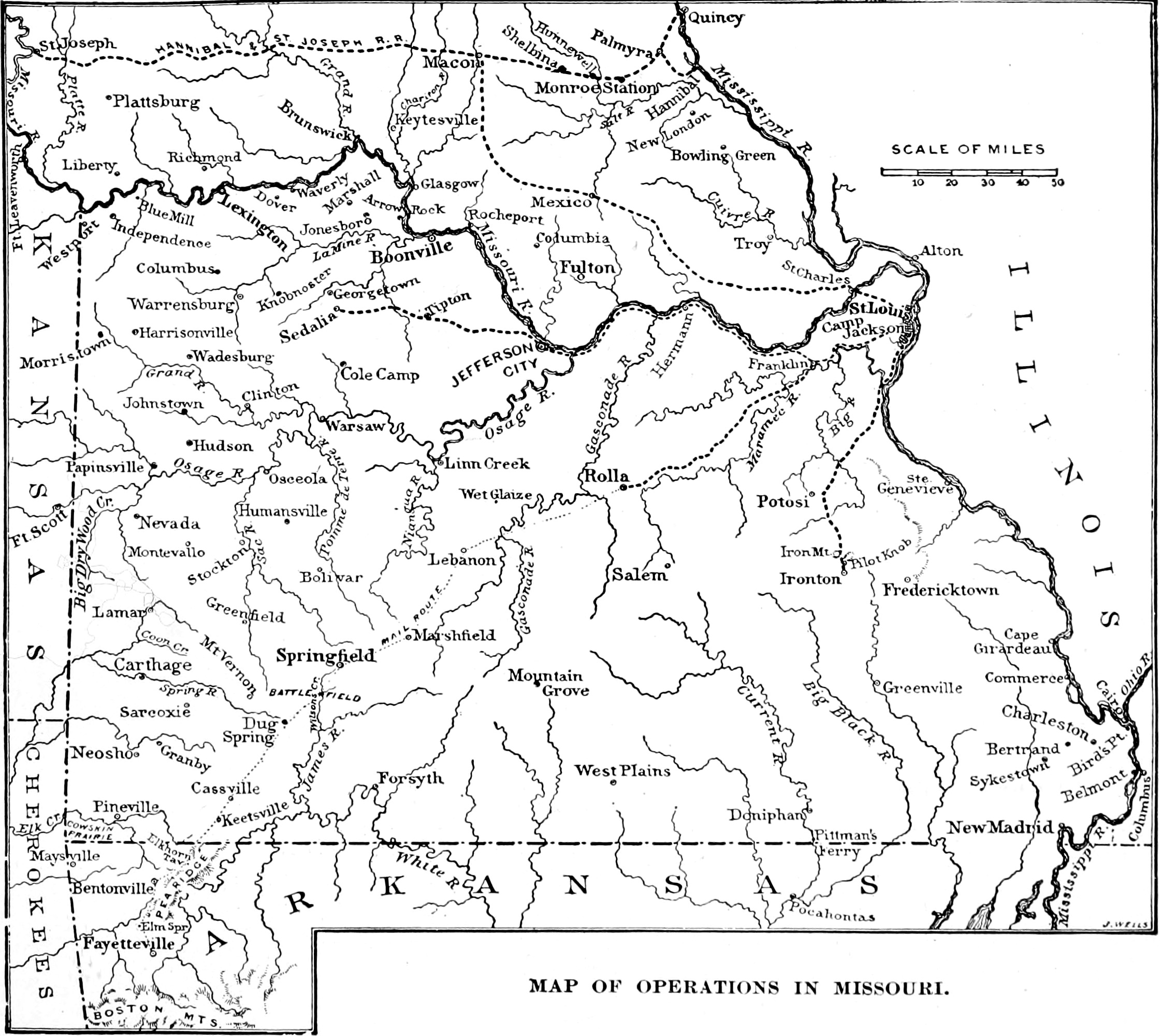
Map of key points in Missouri, including Jefferson City, Boonville, and Carthage

When the American Civil War began in early 1861, the state of Missouri did not secede despite being a slave state, as both secessionist and Unionist viewpoints had substantial support among the state's populace. The Governor of Missouri, Claiborne Fox Jackson, mobilized pro-secession state militia, which encamped near St. Louis, where a federal arsenal was located. Brigadier General Nathaniel Lyon of the Union Army, commander of the arsenal, dispersed the militiamen on May 10, in the Camp Jackson affair. Lyon's action was followed by a pro-secession riot in St. Louis. In response, Jackson formed the pro-secession Missouri State Guard, a militia unit; Major General (Note: Of state troops.) Sterling Price was appointed as its commander on May 12. On June 15, Lyon drove Jackson and the secessionists from the state capital of Jefferson City; Jackson then went to Boonville. Two days later, the secessionists were forced from there, and Jackson and Price fell back to southwestern Missouri, pursued by Lyon.

In early August, Price and the Missouri State Guard were joined by Confederate States Army troops commanded by Brigadier General Ben McCulloch. On August 10, Lyon attacked the combined camp of Price and McCulloch. Lyon was killed, and the battle ended in a Union defeat. Price and the Missouri State Guard then headed north towards the Missouri River in a campaign that culminated in the successful Siege of Lexington in September. In October, Union forces commanded by Major General John C. Frémont concentrated against Price, who retreated southwards to Neosho, where he was joined by Jackson. On November 3, Jackson and the pro-secession legislators voted to secede and join the Confederate States of America, functioning as a government-in-exile, first from Arkansas and later from Marshall, Texas. The remaining portion of the state legislature had previously voted to remain in the Union.

In February 1862, pressure from Brigadier General Samuel R. Curtis's Union Army of the Southwest led Price to abandon Missouri for Arkansas. In March, Price, McCulloch, and Major General Earl Van Dorn joined forces to form the Army of the West. Van Dorn moved against Curtis, and the two foes fought the Battle of Pea Ridge on March 7 and 8. McCulloch was killed and the Confederates and Missouri State Guardsmen were defeated. After Pea Ridge, the Army of the West retreated to Van Buren, Arkansas. Eventually, many of the members of the Missouri State Guard transferred to official Confederate States Army formations. Around September 7, while located at Van Buren, Captain Westley (Note: Sometimes spelled Westly.) F. Roberts formed a field artillery battery that would bear his name.

The battery was armed with horse-drawn cannons in October: two 12-pounder James rifles taken from Union forces at the Battle of Lone Jack and two obsolescent 6-pounder smoothbores. Unlike the smoothbores, the captured James rifles had a series of spiral grooves engraved along the inside of the gun barrel, which spun the projectile when it was fired, giving the cannon greater effective range and accuracy. The James rifles had a range of 1,700 yards (1.6 km), and the 6-pounder smoothbores had a range of 1,500 yards (1.4 km). Both of these cannons were field guns designed to fire solid shot at a flat trajectory over a long range. Later in the war, the battery was equipped with two 10-pounder Parrott rifles and two 12-pounder howitzers. Parrott rifles had a range of between 2,970 yards (2,720 m) and 3,200 yards (2,900 m) depending on the variant, while the howitzers only had a maximum range of 1,072 yards (980 m). The howitzers fired at a higher trajectory, which was useful where rough terrain made projectiles fired with a flat trajectory ineffective. Confederate artillerymen were hampered by problems with gunpowder and artillery fuze quality, which often resulted in premature detonation of shells, sometimes while still in the cannon. All of the pieces used by the battery required a crew of four to six men.

== Service history ==
=== 1862 ===
On December 7, the battery was engaged during the Battle of Prairie Grove in Arkansas. During the fight, Roberts' Battery was part of Colonel Robert G. Shaver's brigade, along with several infantry regiments from Arkansas. Shaver's brigade was initially held in reserve, but it was ordered from the Confederate left flank to the right flank by Army of the Trans-Mississippi commander Major General Thomas C. Hindman. Roberts' Battery then moved forward onto a ridge. The battery's new position gave it a clear field of fire against Brigadier General Francis J. Herron's Union division. Of the battery's four cannons, only the two James rifles could be deployed due to the terrain, although the two 6-pounders were still with the battery. The James rifles were the only rifled cannons available to the Confederates at Prairie Grove. After deploying, Roberts' Battery came under heavy Union fire. In turn, the Missourians took up a new position further down the ridge. Even in the new position, heavy Union artillery fire rendered the battery's position untenable, and the guns were withdrawn up the hill. Eventually, Roberts decided that the battery could not hold its position, and the gunners abandoned the pieces and took shelter in some nearby woods. The battery had participated in the fighting at Prairie Grove for two hours, and damaged two cannons of Battery L, 1st Missouri Light Artillery; one shot from the battery wounded a man riding near Herron. The battle ended when night fell, and the Confederates retreated from the field. In order to mask the noises of retreat, the wheels of Roberts' Battery's cannons and caissons were padded with blankets. The retreat continued until the Confederates reached Van Buren, a process that took two days.

=== 1863 ===
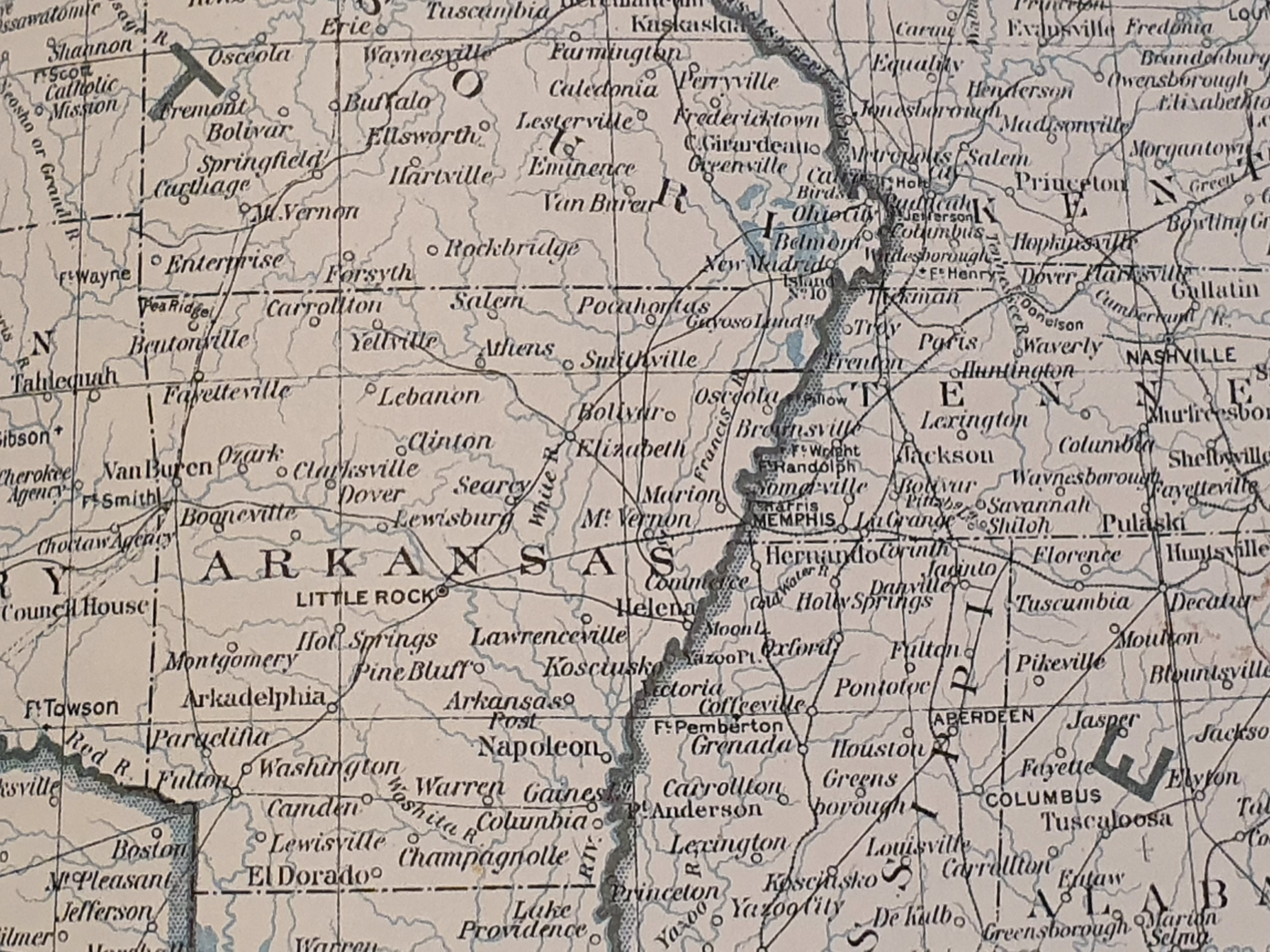
Map of key points in Arkansas, including Van Buren, Little Rock, and Pine Bluff

By January 6, 1863, the battery had been transferred to Little Rock, Arkansas, where Roberts resigned. Lieutenant Samuel T. Ruffner became commander of the battery, which adopted his name. In February, the unit boarded a steamboat for transport to the vicinity of Pine Bluff, Arkansas, which it reached on February 22. While near Pine Bluff, the battery was stationed at a position named Fort Pleasant under the authority of Brigadier General Daniel M. Frost. In June, the battery, as part of a formation commanded by Colonel John Bullock Clark Jr., moved to the area around the Mississippi River with the intent of interfering with Union shipping. Ruffner's Battery, which was armed with four 6-pounders at this time, was positioned in the vicinity of Gaines' Landing, along with the 8th and 9th Missouri Infantry Regiments. After firing on Union Navy shipping on June 22 and 27, Ruffner's Battery, along with the two infantry regiments, skirmished with the 25th Wisconsin Infantry Regiment, the 4th Ohio Battery, and elements of the 5th Illinois Cavalry Regiment on June 28, in the Gaines' Landing vicinity.

In late July, Clark's force was transferred back to Little Rock, as the city was threatened by the Union Army of Arkansas under Major General Frederick Steele. The Confederates abandoned Little Rock on September 10, without a fight. On September 11, Ruffner's Battery was engaged during the Confederate withdrawal. Union cavalry were pursuing the Confederates, and encountered elements from the 11th and 12th Missouri Cavalry Regiments. Ruffner's Battery then fired at the pursuers with the unit's four cannons, inflicting casualties. After additional fighting between the Union cavalry and the 5th Missouri Cavalry Regiment and Elliott's Missouri Cavalry Battalion, the retreat continued without further pursuit. After the retreat from the city, Ruffner's Battery was temporarily assigned to Marmaduke's cavalry division.

Relevant locations in Arkansas

After capturing Little Rock, Union troops occupied several points on the Arkansas River. Pine Bluff was occupied by the 5th Kansas and 1st Indiana Cavalry Regiments; the garrison was commanded by Colonel Powell Clayton. On October 25, Marmaduke attacked Pine Bluff. The Union cavalrymen barricaded the town square, which was then assaulted by Marmaduke's cavalry. The attack quickly bogged down and Ruffner's Battery, which had remained in reserve with other Confederate artillery, was called into action. The unit served on the right of the Confederate line, and opened fire with three cannons on the Union position (near the local courthouse) from the grounds of a church. While the artillery fire forced the defenders from some of their positions, the main Union line held up under fire. Further Confederate cavalry charges failed to carry the makeshift defensive position, and Marmaduke's men withdrew after engaging in some looting. On December 2, the battery's assignment to Marmaduke's division ended, and the unit left Marmaduke on the 5th. Ruffner's Battery returned to Fort Pleasant without its cannons, which were given to Joseph Bledsoe's Missouri Battery. Once the fort was reached, Ruffner's Battery was assigned the cannons of a defunct artillery unit known as Von Puhl's Missouri Battery: two 10-pounder Parrott rifles and two 12-pounder howitzers.

=== 1864–1865 ===
The battery was later assigned to a new brigade commanded by Clark, which was part of Brigadier General Mosby M. Parsons's division. In March 1864, Parsons's division was transferred to Louisiana, where Major General Richard Taylor and his District of West Louisiana were confronting a Union thrust up the Red River. On April 9, Parsons's division, as part of Taylor's army, engaged the Union force at the Battle of Pleasant Hill, although Ruffner's Battery was in a reserve role and was unengaged. While Confederate assaults at Pleasant Hill were repulsed, the Union army, commanded by Major General Nathaniel Banks, continued a retreat that had begun several days earlier. After Pleasant Hill, General Edmund Kirby Smith, who was in overall command of the Confederate forces, moved his men back into Arkansas, where Steele had occupied Camden. Steele's supply line was tenuous, and he had suffered defeats at the battles of Poison Spring and Marks' Mills. Running low on food, the Union troops abandoned Camden on April 26, with hopes of retreating to Little Rock. The Confederates pursued, and caught up with Steele at the crossing of the Saline River on April 30.

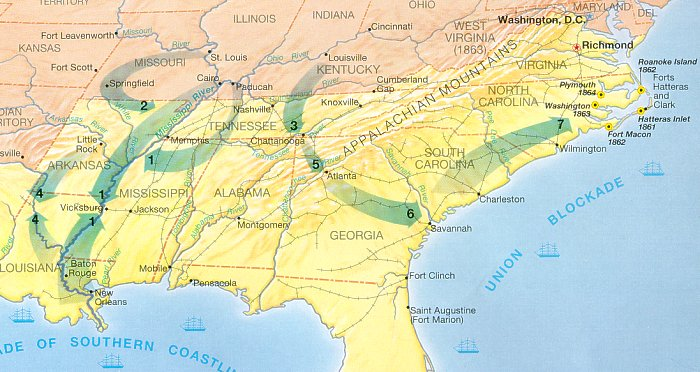
Map of Union movements during the American Civil War, the arrows designated 4 indicate the Red River campaign and the Camden expedition

That morning, as part of the Battle of Jenkins' Ferry, Ruffner's Battery, along with Lesueur's Missouri Battery, positioned themselves to provide supporting fire for an attack by Parsons's Division. When Clark's brigade, along with Colonel Lucien C. Gause's brigade of Brigadier General Thomas J. Churchill's division, attacked the Union line, Ruffner's and Lesueur's Batteries moved forward in support. Clark and Gause were repulsed, exposing the two batteries' positions. Visibility on the battlefield was poor, and Ruffner's Battery stumbled into the 2nd Kansas Colored Infantry Regiment, under the erroneous perception that the Kansans were a Confederate regiment. The error allowed the 2nd Kansas Colored Infantry to capture either two or three of the battery's cannons, which were moved to the Union lines. After the attack miscarried, Churchill's and Parsons's men were withdrawn. The battery suffered 17 casualties at Jenkins' Ferry; seven of the losses were prisoners of war, some of whom were executed by African American soldiers as revenge for African American troops who had been killed by Confederate cavalry while trying to surrender at Poison Spring.

Later that day, Steele's men escaped across the Saline River via a pontoon bridge; they arrived in Little Rock on May 2. Ruffner's Battery was assigned four new cannons, all 6-pounder smoothbores. After Jenkins' Ferry, the unit saw no further action, and spent the rest of the war stationed at various points in Arkansas and Louisiana. On November 19, the battery, which had previously borne the name of its commander, was officially designated the 1st Missouri Field Battery and was assigned to Major William D. Blocher's artillery organization. Smith signed surrender terms for the Trans-Mississippi Department on June 2, 1865; the men of the 1st Missouri Field Battery were paroled five days later, while stationed at Alexandria, Louisiana, ending their combat experience. Over the course of the unit's existence, roughly 170 men served in it at some time or another. At least six of them were killed in battle, and at least four more died of illnesses.

== See also ==
- Bibliography of the American Civil War
- List of American Civil War battles

== Sources ==
- Barr, Alwyn (August 1963). "Confederate Artillery in Arkansas". The Arkansas Historical Quarterly. 22 (3). Arkansas Historical Association: 238–272. doi:10.2307/40007663. JSTOR 40007663.
- Bearss, Edwin C. (1962). Decision in Mississippi: Mississippi's Important Role in the War Between the States. Jackson, Mississippi: Mississippi Commission on the War Between the States. OCLC 498809.
- Bearss, Edwin C. (Winter 1964). "Marmaduke Attacks Pine Bluff". The Arkansas Historical Quarterly. 23 (4). Arkansas Historical Association: 291–313. doi:10.2307/40030666. JSTOR 40030666.
- Forsyth, Michael J. (2003). The Camden Expedition of 1864. Jefferson, North Carolina: McFarland & Company, Inc. ISBN 0-7864-1554-1.
- Geise, William R. (1962). "Missouri's Confederate Capital in Marshall, Texas". The Southwestern Historical Quarterly. 66 (2). Texas State Historical Association: 193–207. JSTOR 30236239.
- Gottschalk, Phil (1991). In Deadly Earnest: The Missouri Brigade. Columbia, Missouri: Missouri River Press. ISBN 0-9631136-1-5.
- Johnson, Ludwell H. (1993) [1958]. Red River Campaign: Politics and Cotton in the Civil War. Kent, Ohio: Kent State University Press. ISBN 0-87338-486-5.
- Kennedy, Frances H., ed. (1998). The Civil War Battlefield Guide (2nd ed.). Boston/New York: Houghton Mifflin. ISBN 978-0-395-74012-5.
- McGhee, James E. (2008). Guide to Missouri Confederate Regiments, 1861–1865. Fayetteville, Arkansas: University of Arkansas Press. ISBN 978-1-55728-870-7.
- Ripley, Warren (1970). Artillery and Ammunition of the Civil War. New York: Promontory Press. ISBN 0-88394-003-5.
- Shea, William L. (2009). Fields of Blood: The Prairie Grove Campaign. Chapel Hill, North Carolina: University of North Carolina Press. ISBN 978-0-8078-3315-5.
- The War of the Rebellion: A Compilation of the Official Records of the Union and Confederate Armies. Vol. 22. Washington, D.C.: United States Government Printing Office. 1888. OCLC 262466842.
- Woodhead, Henry, ed. (1996) [1991]. Echoes of Glory: Arms and Equipment of the Confederacy. Alexandria, Virginia: Time-Life. ISBN 0-8094-8850-7.
