= 9th Missouri Infantry Regiment =

Infantry regiment of the Confederate States Army

9th Missouri Infantry Regiment Clark's Missouri Infantry
- Active: November 16, 1862 to June 7, 1865
- Country: Confederate States of America
- Branch: Confederate States Army
- Type: Infantry
- Size: 594 (December 1, 1862)
- Engagements: American Civil War: Battle of Prairie Grove; Battle of Pleasant Hill; Battle of Jenkins' Ferry

The 9th Missouri Infantry Regiment (originally Clark's Missouri Infantry) was an infantry regiment that served in the Confederate States Army during the American Civil War. The unit was formed on November 16, 1862, and was originally commanded by Colonel John Bullock Clark Jr. At the Battle of Prairie Grove on December 7, 1862, the regiment was officially in Brigadier General John S. Roane's brigade, although it served with Brigadier General Mosby M. Parsons' brigade for most of the battle. After spending the summer of 1863 harassing Union Navy shipping on the Mississippi River, the regiment was reorganized, with elements of an Arkansas unit being replaced with the 8th Missouri Infantry Battalion. After the reorganization, the regiment fought in the Battle of Pleasant Hill and the Battle of Jenkins' Ferry in April 1864. On June 7, 1865, the men of the regiment were paroled; they would eventually be sent back to Missouri via steamboat.

== Organization ==
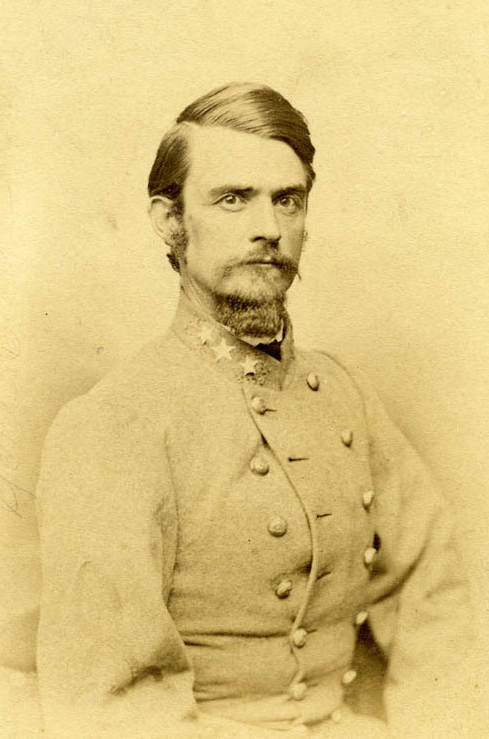
Colonel John Bullock Clark Jr.

The 9th Missouri Infantry Regiment originated when John Bullock Clark Jr., a veteran of the Missouri State Guard, was placed in command of four companies of newly recruited Missourians with the intention of sending them to Fort Smith, Arkansas. Clark's recruits were combined with the men of Clarkson's Independent Ranger Battalion, an Arkansas-raised unit. The new regiment, which was mustered into Confederate service on November 16, appears to have contained only eight companies, as opposed to the standard ten; this arrangement violated Confederate regulations for the formation of regiments. Clark was appointed the regiment's first colonel, Michael W. Buster (formerly of Clarkson's unit) was the first lieutenant colonel, and James Quinn Morton served as the original major. As of November 16, the regiment contained eight companies, designated with the letters A–E and G–I. Companies A, B, C, and H contained men from Missouri while the others contained men from Arkansas; the Arkansas men came from Clarkson's Independent Ranger Battalion. (Note: Companies F and K do not appear to have existed.)

== Service history ==
=== 1862 ===
The unit, known as Clark's Missouri Infantry, was assigned to the brigade of Brigadier General John S. Roane. The regiment's strength was reported at 594 men on December 1, 1862. At the Battle of Prairie Grove on December 7, Roane's brigade contained four cavalry regiments from Texas and two artillery batteries from Arkansas, in addition to Clark's Missouri Infantry. During the early stages of the battle, Roane's brigade was sent to the Confederate left to align next to Brigadier General Mosby M. Parsons' brigade. Later in the fighting, Roane detached the regiment to serve with Parsons' brigade, which was making a charge against the Union line; it served on the left flank of Parsons' line. Clark's Missouri Infantry hit the right flank of Colonel William A. Weer's brigade, but heavy Union artillery fire blunted the charge. Parsons' brigade was eventually able to force back Weer's brigade by turning the Union left flank, and another charge was made. The regiment was also on Parsons' left for this charge, but heavy Union artillery fire forced the regiment to retreat in the early stages of the charge, which eventually failed. The regiment suffered 26 casualties during the battle. After Prairie Grove, the regiment retreated to Van Buren, Arkansas, where it remained until December 28.

=== 1863 ===
On January 4, 1863, while the regiment was in the process of transferring to Little Rock, Arkansas, a new brigade was formed. Clark was placed in command of the brigade, and the regiment was assigned to it. The regiment did not reach Little Rock until January 16. On February 7, the regiment was moved via steamboat to White's Bluff, Arkansas. Not long afterwards, the regiment boarded the Granite State for transfer to Day's Bluff, Arkansas, where it encamped at Fort Pleasant. On June 12, Clark's brigade began a raid to the Mississippi River, with the intention of harassing Union Navy shipping. The brigade, including Clark's Missouri Infantry, attacked a gunboat and several transport vessels on June 22, causing some damage. The unit then damaged more Union shipping on June 27 before returning to Fort Pleasant on July 13. The regiment was officially redesignated as the 9th Missouri Infantry Regiment on July 23. In late July, the regiment built fortifications designed to protect Little Rock, which was threatened by Union Major General Frederick Steele. On September 10, the 9th Missouri Infantry evacuated Little Rock and retreated to Arkadelphia, Arkansas.

==== Reorganization ====
On September 30, the Arkansas-raised companies of Clarkson's former Independent Ranger Battalion were transferred out of the regiment to form a new battalion and were replaced by six companies from the 8th Missouri Infantry Battalion. Clark retained nominal command of the unit, although Richard H. Musser was appointed as lieutenant colonel of the regiment. Richard Gaines was the regiment's new major. As of September 30, the regiment contained 10 companies, designated with the letters A–I and K; all of which were Missouri-raised.

The new regiment was then assigned to the brigade of Brigadier General Thomas F. Drayton, with which it transferred to Camp Bragg on October 20, where it spent the rest of 1863 in winter quarters.

=== 1864–1865 ===
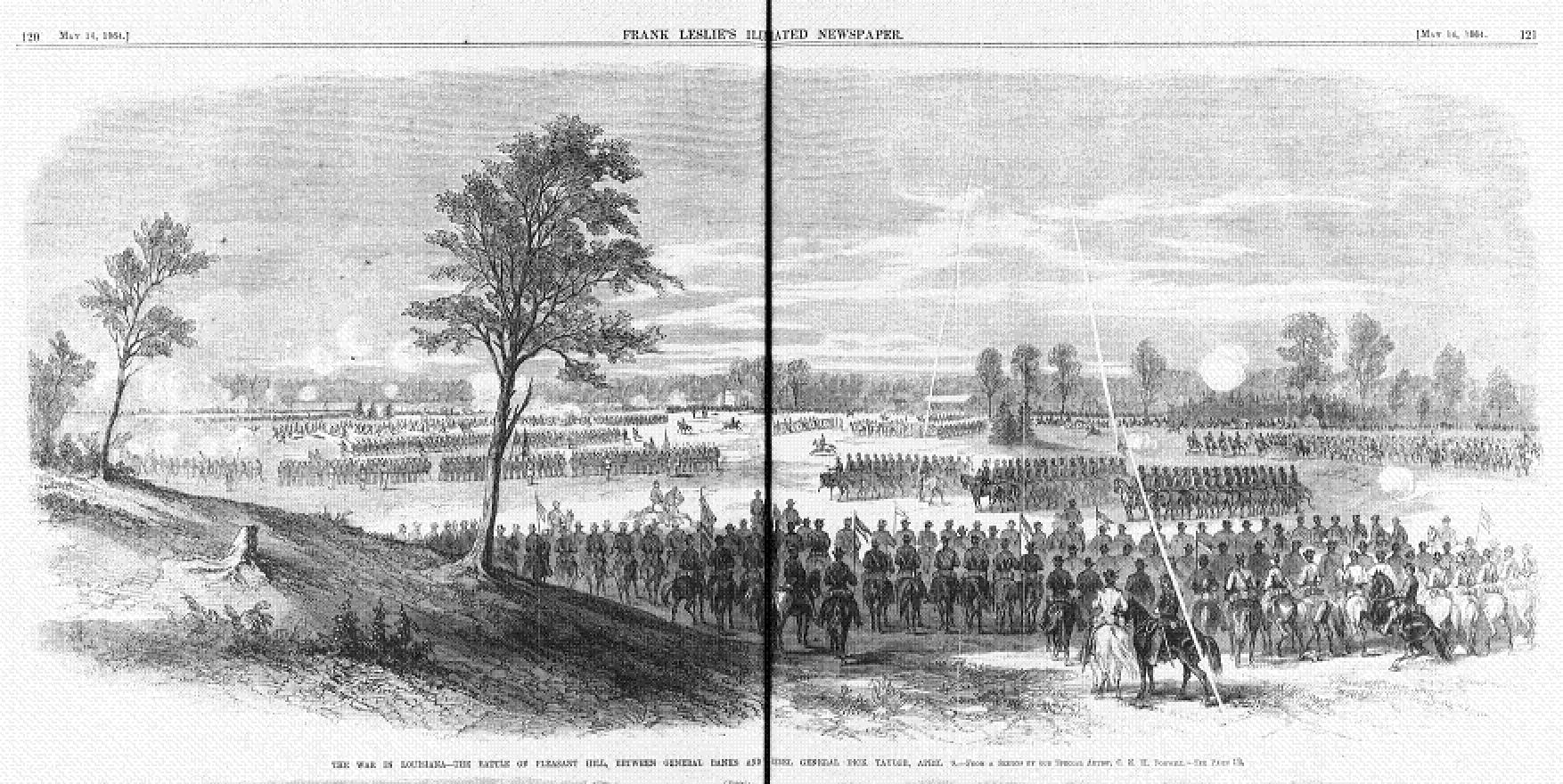
Battle of Pleasant Hill

On January 12, 1864, Clark was elevated to brigade command, and Musser replaced Clark as commander of the regiment. (Note: Musser was promoted to colonel on March 4.) On January 29, the regiment left Camp Bragg and moved to a location in Hempstead County, Arkansas. In March, the 9th Missouri Infantry began moving towards Shreveport, Louisiana, which it reached on March 25. Additionally, on the 25th, a new division was formed from Parsons' brigade and Clark's brigade; Parsons commanded the new entity. Parsons' division left Shreveport on April 3 to come to the aid of Major General Richard Taylor, who was resisting a Union advance up the Red River. The unit reached Taylor at Pleasant Hill, Louisiana on April 9. At the Battle of Pleasant Hill later that day, Parsons' division was on the right of the Confederate line, and Clark's brigade was to the right of Parsons' other brigade, which was commanded Colonel Simon P. Burns. The initial charge was successful, breaking through the line of a Union brigade and capturing two artillery batteries. However, a Union counterattack hit Parsons' flank, and the Confederate attack broke, with the men retreating in disorder. The 9th Missouri Infantry officially reported 113 casualties, although Musser later stated that he believed the true count was about 175 men.

After Pleasant Hill, the unit moved north to confront Steele, whose Union force was occupying Camden, Arkansas. Steele retreated in the face of the Confederate advance, but his force was caught at the crossing of the Saline River. At the Battle of Jenkins' Ferry on April 30, the 9th Missouri Infantry was still in Clark's brigade, which also contained the 8th Missouri Infantry Regiment and Ruffner's Missouri Battery. Parsons' division arrived at the Jenkins' Ferry battlefield around 9:00 a.m., and deployed over the course of the next hour. Burns' brigade was positioned on the left, and Clark's on the right. Clark's brigade attacked alongside the brigade of Colonel Lucien C. Gause. Clark and Gause's attack was aided by artillery fire from Ruffner's Battery and Lesueur's Missouri Battery, but thick mud impeded the attack. Between the thick mud and a counterattack by the 2nd Kansas Colored Infantry Regiment, the Confederate attack was unable to crack the Union line. The Kansas regiment also captured three Confederate cannons. The battle ended with Steele's force escaping across the Saline. The regiment suffered 52 casualties at Jenkins' Ferry. Jenkins' Ferry was the last major combat action the regiment saw; the unit spent the rest of the war stationed at various points in Arkansas and Louisiana. On June 7, 1865, the survivors of the regiment were paroled at Alexandria, Louisiana; the steamboat B. L. Hodge transported the men back to Missouri.

== Sources ==
- Forsyth, Michael J. (2003). The Camden Expedition of 1864. Jefferson, North Carolina: McFarland & Company, Inc. ISBN 0-7864-1554-1.
- Johnson, Ludwell H. (1993). Red River Campaign: Politics and Cotton in the Civil War. Kent, Ohio: Kent State University Press. ISBN 0-87338-486-5.
- McGhee, James E. (2008). Guide to Missouri Confederate Regiments, 1861–1865. Fayetteville, Arkansas: University of Arkansas Press. ISBN 978-1-55728-870-7.
- Shea, William L. (2009). Fields of Blood: The Prairie Grove Campaign. Chapel Hill: University of North Carolina Press. ISBN 978-0-8078-3315-5.
