= Curran Hall =

Historic house in Arkansas, United States

- U.S. National Register of Historic Places
- U.S. Historic district – Contributing property
- Drawing of the house

- Location within Arkansas Location within the United States
- Location: 615 E. Capitol St., Little Rock, Arkansas
- Coordinates: 34°44′34.2″N 92°15′52.5″W
- Area: less than one acre
- Built: 1842
- Architect: Gideon Shryock
- Architectural style: Greek Revival
- Part of: MacArthur Park Historic District (ID77000269)
- NRHP reference No.: 76000453

Significant dates
- Added to NRHP: January 1, 1976
- Designated CP: July 25, 1977

Curran Hall, also known as the Walters-Curran-Bell House, is a historic house at 615 East Capitol Street in Little Rock, Arkansas. It was built in 1842 for Colonel Ebenezer Walters. The single story house is built in the Greek Revival style with Doric pilasters at the entrance way. Two auxiliary buildings, constructed at about the same time as the main building, were moved and attached to the rear of the house in 1891.

The house is significant as one of the few remaining antebellum era landmarks in Little Rock. It served as the home of pre-Civil war Arkansas Supreme Court Justice George Watkins. Jacob Frolich purchased the home after the war, who would become a post-reconstruction Arkansas Secretary of State. Before that, however, Frolich, an opponent of the reconstruction Arkansas government and fearful of reprisals, fortified Curran Hall with trap doors and placed his livestock inside the house at night. Frolich was indicted for the murder of a reputed informant for the reconstruction government and fled to Canada, but later returned and was acquitted of the charge.

In 1976, the house was added to the National Register of Historic Places. It was acquired by the City of Little Rock and the Little Rock Advertising and Promotion Commission in 1996, renovated, and opened as an information center in 2002.

== See also ==
- National Register of Historic Places listings in Little Rock, Arkansas
