= Dandridge McRae =

Confederate States Army general

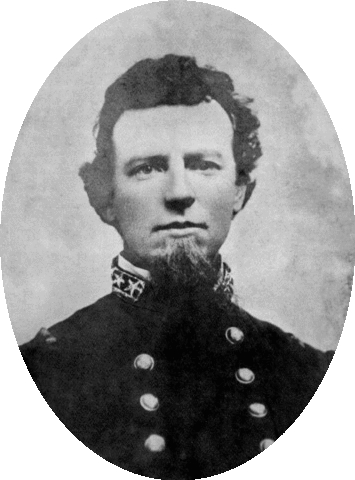
- McRae in uniform, c. 1862
- Born: October 10, 1829; Baldwin County, Alabama, U.S.
- Died: April 23, 1899 (aged 69); Searcy, Arkansas, U.S.
- Burial place: Searcy, Arkansas, U.S.
- Education: South Carolina College (BA)
- Spouse: Angie Lewis (m. 1855)
- Children: 4
- Military career
- Allegiance: Confederate States
- Service: Confederate States Army
- Service years: 1861–1864
- Rank: Brigadier-General
- Commands: 15th Arkansas Infantry Regiment; 28th Arkansas Infantry Regiment; McRae's Brigade
- Battles: American Civil War; Battle of Oak Hills; Battle of Elkhorn Tavern; Battle of Hill’s Plantation; Battle of Prairie Grove; Battle of Helena; Little Rock Campaign; Battle of Fitzhugh's Woods

Dandridge McRae (October 10, 1829 – April 23, 1899) was an American lawyer, court official, and Inspector General of Arkansas State Troops, as well as a brigadier general in the Confederate States Army during the American Civil War. He served in several key battles that helped secure Arkansas for the Confederacy, prolonging the war in the Western Theater.

== Biography ==
Dandridge McRae was born in Baldwin County, Alabama, the son of Margaret (Bracy) and D. R. W. McRae. He graduated in 1849 from South Carolina College, where he was a member of the Euphradian Society and the Corps of Cadets. McRae moved to Searcy in White County, Arkansas. He was admitted to the bar and served as clerk of the county and circuit courts for six years.

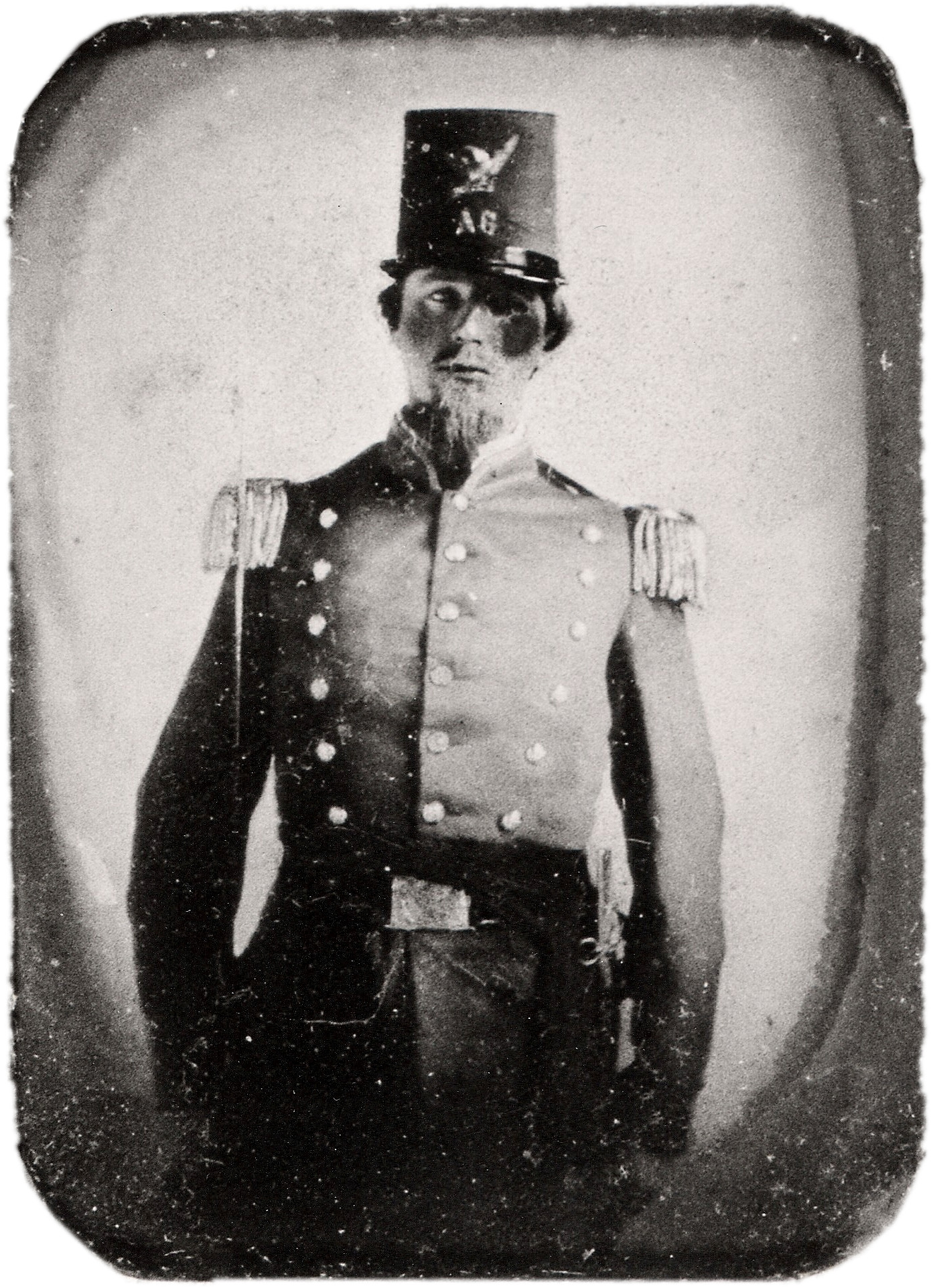
McRae in "Arkansas Guards" officer uniform. He was elected captain of White County's antebellum militia company in September 1860.

McRae began his military service in Arkansas on September 12, 1860, when he was elected captain of the "Arkansas Guards", an element of the 21st Regiment of the Arkansas militia, headquartered in White County. He led this company as part of the militia forces that seized the Federal Arsenal at Little Rock in early February 1861. After the arsenal seizure, McRae returned to White County and organized a volunteer cavalry troop, the Border Rangers, in Searcy, Arkansas, in April 1861, where he was elected and served as captain. McRae had also been appointed by Governor Henry Massey Rector to serve as the inspector general of the new Arkansas State Troops. McRae was first sent to Camp Rector at Hopefield, (near modern-day West Memphis, Arkansas) to begin the mustering in of troops. During this time McRae is occasionally referenced by other militia commanders as General McRae, probably in connection with his role as inspector general. McRae left Hopefield shortly after the Arkansas State secession convention dispatched a political general, Thomas H. Bradley of Crittenden County, to assume command. McRae was next dispatched to Northwest Arkansas to assist Brigadier General Nicholas Bartlett Pearce in the mustering of Arkansas State Troops in the Western Division of the Provisional Army of Arkansas.

McRae was elected as lieutenant colonel in command of the 3rd Arkansas Infantry Battalion on 15 July 1861. He led his battalion in action at the Battle of Wilson’s Creek, Missouri, on 10 August 1861 and was commended for his coolness under fire and his leadership of his soldiers. In December 1861 Colonel McRae’s battalion was augmented with additional volunteer infantry companies and reorganized into the 15th Arkansas Infantry Regiment, and he was promoted to colonel. The regiment was transferred to Missouri under the command of the Army of the West, but, shortly after the transfer, Colonel McRae was granted a transfer back to his adopted state to take command of the then forming 28th Arkansas Infantry Regiment.

McRae took part in the Battle of Pea Ridge in March 1862 and received commendations from his commander, Earl Van Dorn. McRae remained in Arkansas while most troops were moved eastward across the Mississippi River and participated in operations there. On November 5, 1862, he was commissioned as a brigadier general.

In 1863, McRae and his command took part in the Battle of Helena in a failed effort to secure that river port for the Confederacy. After the battle there were many accusations as to the causes for the failure of the attack. Two officers were brought up on formal charges of misbehavior before the enemy. Most notably, Brigadier General McRae was accused by Brigadier General Fagan of willful failure to provide assistance during the attack on the Graveyard Hill. On 29 December 1864 a court of inquiry found that Brigadier General McRae was not guilty of any misconduct before the enemy, by order of General E. Kirby Smith.

During the Camden Expedition of the 1864 Red River Campaign, McRae's brigade formed part of the force under General Sterling Price. They participated in the Battle of Marks' Mills and the Battle of Jenkins' Ferry, forcing the Union forces out of southern Arkansas and back to Little Rock. McRae then led his brigade in battles in northern Arkansas and in Missouri later that year until he resigned his commission.

After leaving the service, McRae returned to Searcy and took up the practice of law. Along with future three-term Arkansas Secretary of State Jacob Frolich, McRae headed the White County chapter of the Ku Klux Klan during Reconstruction. Both Frolich and McRae were part of a group of men indicted for the 1868 murder of Albert Parker, an agent of Gov. Powell Clayton sent to investigate KKK activity in White County. Though the charges were ultimately dropped, both men fled Searcy upon warrants being issued for their arrest. McRae took shelter with a friend in neighboring Woodruff County, while Frolich fled to Canada. In 1881, McRae was elected as the deputy secretary of state, serving under Secretary of State Jacob Frolich. He focused his post-war activities on promoting the commercial interests of the State of Arkansas. He was a delegate to various commercial expositions and served as president of the bureau of information for Arkansas.

After suffering a stroke in 1897, McRae began to decline physically. He died on April 23, 1899, at Searcy, Arkansas, where he is buried.

== See also ==
- List of Confederate generals
