= Camp Bragg (Arkansas) =

Former military encampment in Arkansas, United States

Coordinates: 33.4772°N 93.0457°W

Camp Bragg
- Near Woodlawn, Arkansas, C.S.

Site history
- Built: October 21, 1863 (163 years ago)
- Built by: Confederate troops
- In use: October 21, 1863 – January 29, 1864
- Battles/wars: American Civil War

Garrison information
- Past commanders: Lieut. Gen. Theophilus H. Holmes
- Garrison: Headquarters, District of Arkansas
- Occupants: Price's Division

Camp Bragg was a Confederate encampment during the American Civil War, located in Ouachita (present-day Nevada) County, Arkansas, United States, about 23 miles (37 km) southwest of Camden. It served as Headquarters of the District of Arkansas from October 1863 until January 1864, when it was replaced by Camp Sumter.

== History ==
The evacuation of Little Rock, the state capital, by the Confederate District of Arkansas in the fall of 1863 dictated the need for a new headquarters location. Camp Bragg, presumably named for General Braxton Bragg, was "situated on a pine ridge with a steep hollow on one side, and a swamp on the other."
