= John Bullock Clark Jr. =

American politician (1831–1903)

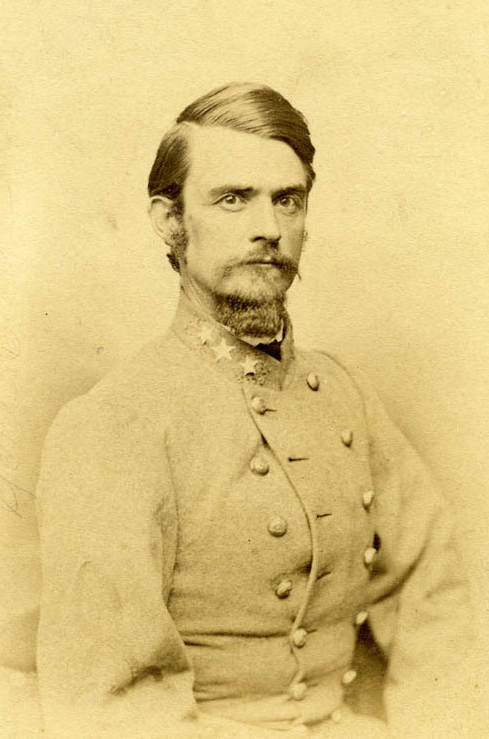

Member of the U.S. House of Representatives from Missouri's 11th district
- In office March 4, 1873 – March 3, 1883
- Preceded by: District established
- Succeeded by: Richard P. Bland

Personal details
- Born: January 14, 1831 Fayette, Missouri, U.S.
- Died: September 7, 1903 (aged 72) Washington, D.C., U.S.
- Resting place: Rock Creek Cemetery
- Party: Democratic
- Parent: John Bullock Clark (father)
- Education: Harvard University

Military service
- Allegiance: Confederate States
- Branch/service: Confederate States Army
- Years of service: 1861–1865
- Rank: Brigadier General
- Battles/wars: American Civil War; Battle of Carthage; First Battle of Springfield; Battle of Pea Ridge; Battle of Pleasant Hill; Price's Raid

John Bullock Clark Jr. (January 14, 1831 – September 7, 1903) was an American politician and Confederate military officer. He was a general in the Confederate States Army during the American Civil War and a Reconstruction era five-term U.S. Congressman from Missouri.

== Biography ==
Clark was born in Fayette, Missouri, the son of John Bullock Clark, a three-term member of the United States House of Representatives. He attended Fayette Academy and the University of Missouri before spending two years in California for travel and adventure. Clark moved to the East and graduated from the law department of Harvard University in 1854. He was admitted to the bar and practiced in his native Fayette from 1855 until the commencement of the Civil War.

He entered the Confederate army as a lieutenant and was promoted successively to the rank of captain and then major in the 6th Missouri Infantry. He saw action in several battles, including Carthage and Springfield. Promoted to the regiment's colonelcy, Clark commanded a brigade at the Battle of Pea Ridge. Primarily serving in Missouri and Arkansas under Thomas C. Hindman, he was rewarded with a commission as a brigadier general on March 6, 1864. He then fought in the Trans-Mississippi Theater under John S. Marmaduke and Jo Shelby, including Price's Raid.

After the war, he resumed his law practice in Fayette and was elected as a Democrat to the Forty-third and to the four succeeding Congresses, serving from 1873 until 1883. He was Chairman of the Committee on the Post Office and Post Roads (Forty-fourth Congress). Clark was an unsuccessful candidate for renomination in 1882, but stayed in Washington, D.C. as the Clerk of the House of Representatives from 1883 until 1889, when he retired from politics.

He engaged in the practice of law in Washington, D.C. until his death in that city. He was buried in Rock Creek Cemetery.

Clark is the namesake of the city of Clark, Missouri.

== See also ==
- List of American Civil War generals (Confederate)

== Notes ==
U.S. House of Representatives
Preceded by District created	Member of the U.S. House of Representatives from Missouri's 11th congressional district 1873–1883	Succeeded by Richard P. Bland
Government offices
Preceded by Edward McPherson	Clerk of the United States House of Representatives; 1883–1889	Succeeded by Edward McPherson
