= Camden Expedition order of battle: Union =

The following Union Army units and commanders fought in the Camden Expedition of the American Civil War. Order of battle compiled from the army organization during the campaign. The Confederate order of battle is listed separately.

== Abbreviations used ==
=== Military rank ===
- MG = Major General
- BG = Brigadier General
- Col = Colonel
- Ltc = Lieutenant Colonel
- Maj = Major
- Cpt = Captain
- Lt = 1st Lieutenant

== Union forces ==
=== VII Corps (Department of Arkansas) ===
MG Frederick Steele
444 officers, 11,162 men, 30 guns (not including Clayton's command)
Escort (2 officers, 88 men):

- 3rd Illinois Cavalry, Company D: Lt Solomon M. Tabor
- 15th Illinois Cavalry, Company H: Cpt Thomas J. Beebe

Division	Brigade	Regiments and Others
Third Division; BG Frederick Salomon; 193 officers, 4,657 men, 16 guns	1st Brigade BG Samuel A. Rice (mw) 30 Apr; Col Charles E. Salomon	50th Indiana: Ltc Samuel T. Wells; 29th Iowa: Col Thomas H. Benton Jr.; 33rd Iowa: Maj Hiram D. Gibson; 9th Wisconsin: Col Charles E. Salomon
Third Division; BG Frederick Salomon; 193 officers, 4,657 men, 16 guns	2nd Brigade Col William E. McLean	43rd Indiana: Maj Wesley W. Norris; 36th Iowa: Col Charles W. Kittredge; 77th Ohio: Col William B. Mason
Third Division; BG Frederick Salomon; 193 officers, 4,657 men, 16 guns	3rd Brigade Col Adolph Engelmann	43rd Illinois: Ltc Adolph Dengler; 40th Iowa: Col John A. Garrett; 27th Wisconsin: Col Conrad Krez
Third Division; BG Frederick Salomon; 193 officers, 4,657 men, 16 guns	Artillery	Springfield Illinois Light Artillery (Vaughn's): Lt Charles W. Thomas; Battery E, 2nd Missouri Light Artillery: Lt Charles Peetz; Voegele's Wisconsin Battery: Cpt Martin Voegele
Frontier Division; BG John Milton Thayer; Infantry: 115 officers, 2,893 men, 10 guns Cavalry: 40 officers, 913 men, 4 guns	1st Brigade Col John Edwards	1st Arkansas: Ltc Elhanon J. Searle; 2nd Arkansas (8 companies): Maj Marshall L. Stephenson; 18th Iowa: Cpt William M. Duncan; 2nd Indiana Battery: Lt Hugh Espey
Frontier Division; BG John Milton Thayer; Infantry: 115 officers, 2,893 men, 10 guns Cavalry: 40 officers, 913 men, 4 guns	2nd Brigade Col Charles W. Adams	1st Kansas (Colored): Col James M. Williams; 2nd Kansas (Colored): Col Samuel J. Crawford; 12th Kansas: Ltc Josiah E. Hayes; 1st Battery, Arkansas Light Artillery: Cpt Denton D. Stark
Frontier Division; BG John Milton Thayer; Infantry: 115 officers, 2,893 men, 10 guns Cavalry: 40 officers, 913 men, 4 guns	3rd Brigade Col Owen Bassett	2nd Kansas Cavalry: Maj Julius G. Fisk; 6th Kansas Cavalry: Ltc William T. Campbell; 14th Kansas Cavalry: Ltc John G. Brown
Cavalry Division; BG Eugene Asa Carr; 1st and 3rd Brigades: 77 officers, 2,611 men	1st Brigade Col John F. Ritter	3rd Arkansas Cavalry (4 companies): Maj George F. Lovejoy; 13th Illinois Cavalry (Company B): Cpt Adolph Bechand; 3rd Iowa Cavalry (detachment): Lt Franz W. Arnim; 1st Missouri Cavalry (8 companies): Cpt Miles Kehoe; 2nd Missouri Cavalry: Cpt William H. Higdon
Cavalry Division; BG Eugene Asa Carr; 1st and 3rd Brigades: 77 officers, 2,611 men	3rd Brigade Col Daniel Anderson	10th Illinois Cavalry (detachment): Ltc James Stuart; 1st Iowa Cavalry: Ltc Joseph W. Caldwell; 3rd Missouri Cavalry: Maj John A. Lennon
Cavalry Division; BG Eugene Asa Carr; 1st and 3rd Brigades: 77 officers, 2,611 men	Independent Cavalry Brigade [Post of Pine Bluff] Col Powell Clayton; Cavalry: 42 officers, 885 men Infantry: 21 officers, 688 men	1st Indiana Cavalry (8 companies): Maj Julian D. Owen; 5th Kansas Cavalry (10 companies): Ltc Wilton A. Jenkins; 7th Missouri Cavalry: Maj Henry P. Spellman; 18th Illinois: Ltc Samuel B. Marks; 28th Wisconsin: Ltc Edmund B. Gray

== See also ==
- Army of Arkansas
- Arkansas in the American Civil War
