= 43rd Indiana Infantry Regiment =

43rd Regiment Indiana Infantry
- Active: 22 September 1861 to 14 June 1865
- Country: United States
- Allegiance: Union
- Branch: Infantry
- Engagements: American Civil War Battle of New Madrid Battle of Island No. 10 First Battle of Memphis Yazoo Pass Expedition Battle of Helena Battle of Bayou Fourche Camden Expedition Battle of Elkin's Ferry Battle of Prairie D'Ane Battle of Marks' Mills Battle of Jenkins' Ferry

Commanders
- Colonel: George Kirkpatrick Steele
- Colonel: William Edward McLean
- Colonel: John Crittenden Major

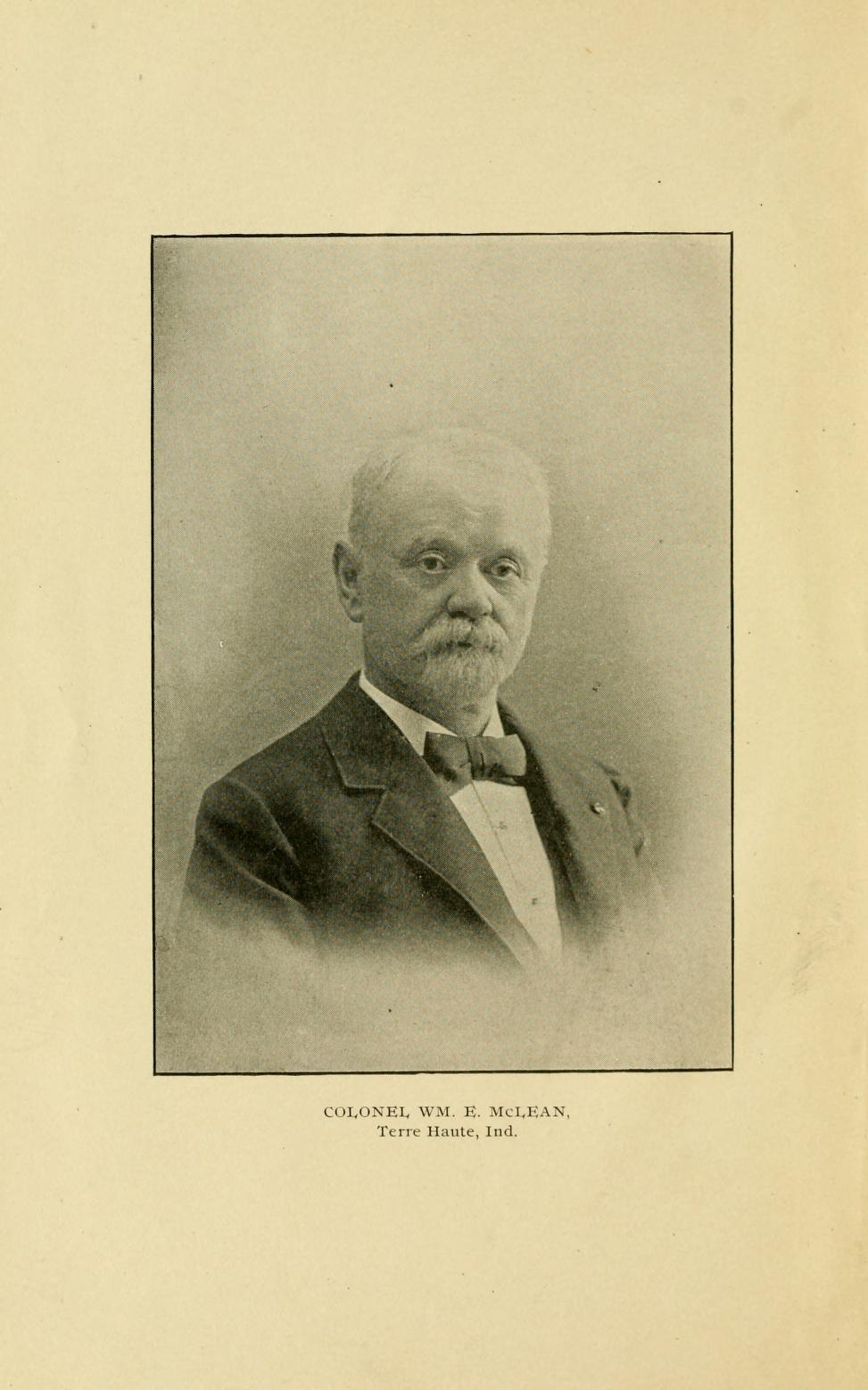
Colonel William McLean, commander of the 43rd Indiana Infantry Regiment during the Civil War. Photo published circa 1903.

The 43rd Regiment of Indiana Infantry was a volunteer infantry unit from the U.S. state of Indiana that served in the Union Army during the U.S. Civil War in the Western Theater. Though deployed at different times in support of Federal operations in Missouri, Tennessee, Kentucky and Mississippi, the majority of its combat service took place in Arkansas. During the ill-fated Camden Expedition (part of Nathaniel Banks' Red River Campaign), it was one of three infantry regiments that, along with the Thirty-sixth Iowa and Seventy-seventh Ohio infantry, comprised the 2nd Brigade of the Third Division commanded by General Frederick Salomon. This division and brigade formed part of the Union VII Corps under Major-General Frederick Steele. A sizable portion of the regiment was killed or captured at the Battle of Marks' Mills on 25 April 1864; the prisoners were sent south to Camp Ford in Tyler, Texas, where eleven of them perished. The remaining elements were transferred northward, and ended their wartime service guarding Confederate prisoners-of-war at Camp Morton in their own home state.

Due to the relative lack of large-scale engagements in the areas where it was deployed, the 43rd did not fight in many battles, nor did it suffer large combat losses during the war. A total of two officers and 41 enlisted men are recorded as having been killed or mortally wounded during the conflict, while five officers and 200 men perished due to disease. In addition, 121 were recorded as deserting, while 285 were unaccounted for.

== Initial organization ==
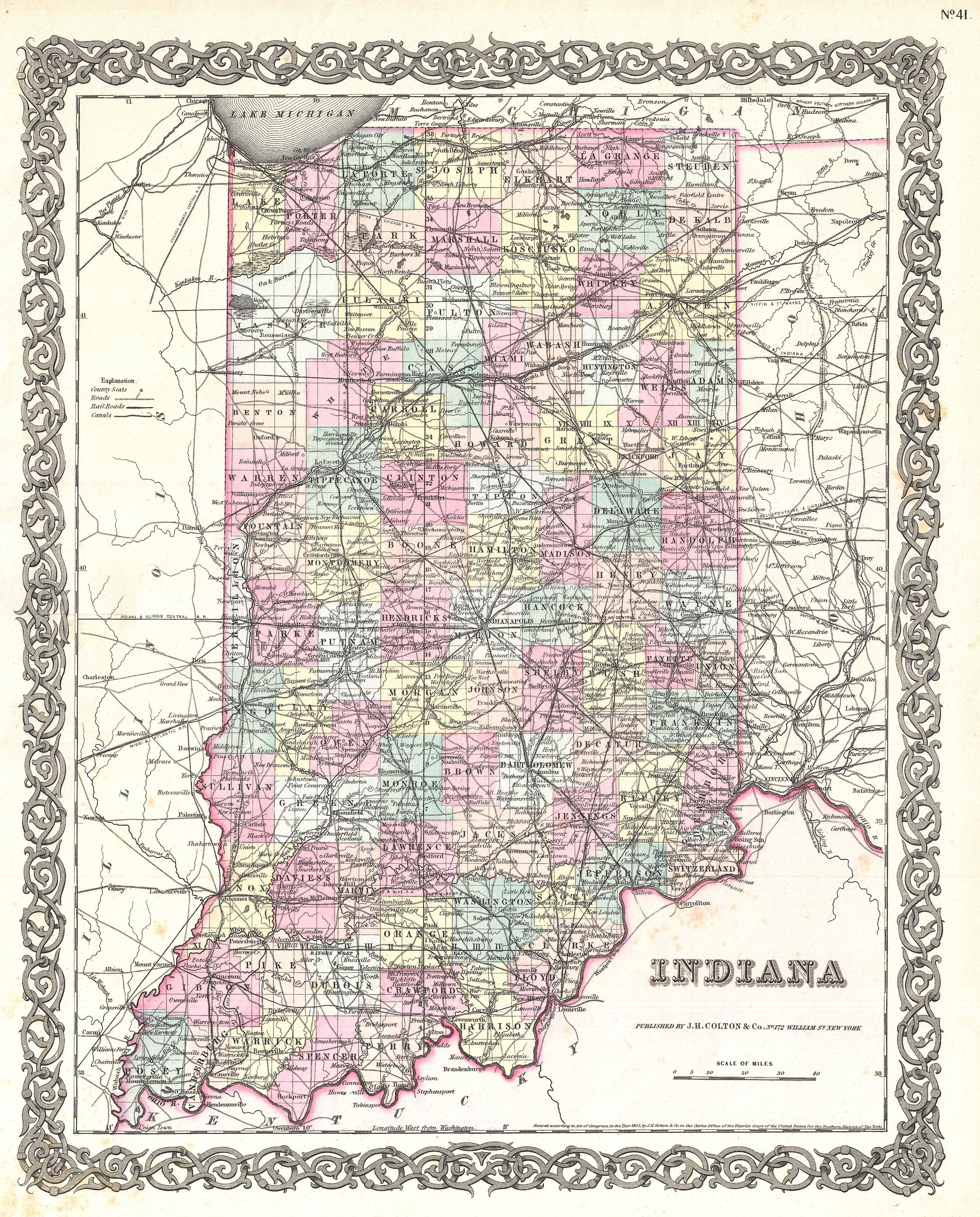
An 1855 map of Indiana. The counties from which the 43rd was recruited were located in the west central part of the state.

The 43rd Indiana was created on 11 September 1861 at Camp Vigo in Terre Haute, Indiana by order of Governor Oliver P. Morton, who commissioned William E. McLean as lieutenant colonel of the regiment, with orders to organize it and prepare it for duty. Fourteen companies were raised, and George K. Steele of Rockville was appointed colonel. However, Steele's advanced age and physical infirmities led him to resign in January 1862, upon which McLean was promoted to colonel and given overall command of the regiment, which he would retain until the end of the war. The regiment was formally mustered in for Federal service on 27 September 1861. Its original strength was 985 officers and men; these would be augmented over the next four years by 1154 recruits, with 165 veterans reenlisting.

Four of the fourteen initial companies were allotted to the newly formed 31st Indiana; the remaining units of the 43rd, together with the counties from which they were recruited, were:

Company	Primary Place of Recruitment	Earliest Captain
A	Clay County	John Crittenden Major
B	Putnam County	Francis Marion Darnall
C	Greene County	Elijah Eddington
D	Vigo County	Wesley W. Norris
E	Sullivan County	Samuel T. Roach
F	Lawrence County	Alexander H. Gainey
G	Clay, Vigo and other nearby counties	Charles W. Moss
H	Putnam County	William Lane
I	Vermillion County	Samuel J. Hall
K	Parke County	John R. Callender

According to Colonel McLean, the men who joined the 43rd were "probably not Sabbath School or YMCA models," but nor were they the "coarse combination of the fighting devil and the jolly, boisterous rowdy" that he said were created by "Miss Nancy novelists" after the war to sell the stories they wrote about it. He went on to describe the men of his regiment in these terms:

The 43rd Regiment was composed principally of young men who had never seen a greater excitement than that afforded by a camp meeting, or a husking bee; whose wildest dissipation had been a horse race or a circus, who had never seen the glint of a gun barrel in a hostile land, nor thought of other slaughter than the game in the woods, or on the prairie.

Private James Gilmore of Co. H, who would go on to a distinguished local legal career after the war, offers this portrait of "the reckless disregard" displayed by some of his regimental comrades—like soldiers of all ages—"for the moral precepts taught [them] in [their] youth:"

I do not mean to say that soldiers, as a rule, were more immoral or less honest than at home; but the restraints of home influences being removed, the younger soldiers were 'prone to wander', and to reconcile their consciences to the doing of things they would never have done at home. They were encouraged in this direction by the fact that conduct on the part of soldiers, that would have been condemned in any community as extremely reprehensible, was tolerated, overlooked or winked at by officers and men. To their credit it may be said that with comparatively few exceptions, the wildest and most reckless soldiers, when discharged from the army at the end of their terms of enlistment, settled down and once more became quiet, honest, law-abiding citizens, thereby showing that they regarded their army experiences as a sort of hiatus in their lives, during which they were not answerable to the laws of civilized communities; but that whatever they might do as soldiers, like Rip Van Winkle's frequent last libations, 'wouldn't count.'

== Early actions ==
On 12 October 1861, the 43rd Indiana left Camp Vigo for Spottsville, Kentucky, where it briefly joined Brigadier General Thomas Crittenden's 5th Division (14th Brigade) in the Army of the Ohio. While there, it guarded the locks on the Green River from local Confederate sympathizers, but saw no combat.

The 43rd was next transferred to then-Brigadier General John Pope's new Army of the Mississippi, where it was brigaded with the 46th Indiana in the second brigade of Brigadier General John Palmer's third division after briefly being assigned to the second division. It was present for the attack on New Madrid and the taking of Island No. 10. The regiment was part of a night march from New Madrid to Point Pleasant in New Madrid County, Missouri, with most of its soldiers detailed to drag a 32-pound Parrott gun—weighing about 4,200 pounds—as part of the siege operations to be conducted there. Veterans of the regiment would later credit this event with causing the 'premature physical decay of many of the very best men of the regiment.'

Following the capture of Island No. 10, the Second Brigade (the 43rd and 46th Indiana Regiments) was ordered to cooperate with the Mississippi River Squadron of the Federal Navy, operating on the Mississippi River under the command of Flag Officer Andrew H. Foote in operations against Fort Pillow. They took up positions around the fort for five weeks, during which time not one weapon was fired in anger by either regiment, until the Confederates were compelled to evacuate on 3–5 June 1862.

== Occupation of Memphis ==
The fall of Ft. Pillow left the Mississippi River open as far south as Memphis, Tennessee, which was occupied by Federal forces after a naval battle on the river adjacent to the city. The 43rd and 46th Indiana were the first two Union regiments to enter Memphis, where they reported a 'pleasant, if not cordial' reception, despite 'a few sullen looks from some of the more radical of its population.' After two weeks of occupation duty, the two regiments were replaced by other Federal troops, and the 43rd was ordered to Helena, Arkansas.

== Action in Arkansas ==
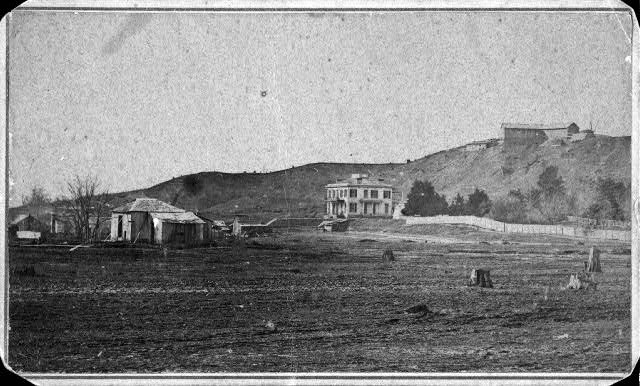
Hindman Hill, successfully defended by the 43rd Indiana and other Federal units during the Battle of Helena

=== Early movements ===
Up to this point, the 43rd Indiana Regiment had not seen any real action, but this was about to change. Upon their arrival in Arkansas, the regiment was ordered to move up the White River, where a few insignificant skirmishes were fought with local Confederate militia. While camped at Clarendon, some unarmed, swimming soldiers of the 43rd were sniped at from the woods across the river. After their comrades returned fire with no discernible effect, the Hoosiers retaliated for the incident by taking every piece of furniture from each house in the village, which they then chopped up and used for firewood.

After joining Leonard F. Ross's abortive Yazoo Pass Expedition in Mississippi in early 1863 (where marshy ground prevented the regiment—or any Federal Army units—from playing any significant role), the regiment returned to duty in Arkansas, where it would meet its first great test.

=== Battle of Helena ===
Helena, Arkansas was a town on the Mississippi River that served as headquarters for the Federal military District of Eastern Arkansas. Initially occupied by 20,000 Union troops and heavily fortified, the town's defenses were badly denuded when four-fifths of the garrison was reassigned to operations around Vicksburg, Mississippi. With only 4000 Federal troops left to defend the city, Helena proved a tempting target for Confederate forces under Lieutenant General Theophilus H. Holmes. Holmes resolved to attack it, in part to relieve pressure on the vital Confederate stronghold of Vicksburg, and also to prevent the city from being used as a staging ground for any further incursions into Arkansas.

With Colonel McLean having been promoted to command of the First Brigade in Brigadier General Frederick Salomon's Thirteenth Division, command of the regiment during the battle passed to Lieutenant Colonel J.C. Major.

Holmes launched his attack at daybreak on 4 July 1863, apparently unaware that Vicksburg was surrendering to Union General Ulysses Grant that same day. During the battle, the 43rd was stationed to the southwest of town, amidst the substantial fortifications of Hindman Hill, where it faced attacking troops of Brigadier General James F. Fagan's Second Brigade of Sterling Price's Division. A misunderstanding of Holmes' orders caused Fagan to attack at first light, a full hour before the rest of his division became engaged. Felled trees prevented his artillery from coming up to support his attack, with the result that the Confederates were forced to advance into the face of murderous Federal rifle and cannon fire, including that of the 43rd. Despite this, Fagan's men managed to take the outer trenches, but were then stopped cold and forced to withdraw by 10:30 AM together with the remainder of the attacking force, leaving the Union in control of Helena. Casualties for the regiment totalled three killed and six wounded.

Following the battle, the 43rd Indiana was mentioned in dispatches by the Commanding General of all Federal forces at Helena, General Prentiss, for its "very efficient service on the left wing of the center." In a speech given four days later, Col. McLean told his regiment: "the Rebels came to get Helena, but succeeded in only getting hell."

=== Capture of the 37th Arkansas Regiment ===
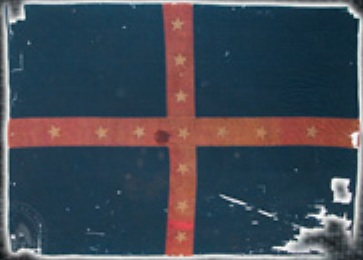
The flag of the 37th Arkansas Infantry Regiment, captured at the Battle of Helena

One of the Confederate regiments involved in Fagan's attack on Hindman Hill during the Battle of Helena was the 37th Arkansas Infantry Regiment, which had previously been the 29th Arkansas. During the Confederate withdrawal, elements of the 43rd Indiana, together with elements of the 33rd Iowa and the 33rd Missouri, managed to capture nearly the entire 37th Arkansas.

Lieutenant-Colonel William H. Heath, commanding the 33rd Missouri, reported:

About 9 a.m. a second attack was made upon Battery D by Fagan's brigade of Arkansas troops, three regiments strong, and said by prisoners to have acted under the personal direction of Lieutenant-General Holmes. The battery was bravely supported by detachments from the Forty-third Indiana, under Major Norris, and the Thirty-third Iowa, under Major Gibson. In spite, however, of the most determined resistance, Bell's regiment [the 37th Arkansas], with small portions of Hawthorn's and Brooks' [the 39th Arkansas and 34th Arkansas, respectively], succeeded in penetrating our outer line of rifle-pits, and securing a position in a deep ravine to the left of the battery and below the range of its guns. The remainder of the brigade was broken and scattered by the terrific fire of our artillery in the works, and compelled to seek shelter in the woods out of range. Immediately upon their retreating, our riflemen from all three regiments in the pits closed in upon those of the enemy who were in the ravine, from all sides cutting off retreat. The reserve of the Forty-third Indiana formed across the mouth of the ravine, and two Parrott guns of the First Missouri Battery, under Lieutenant O'Connell, were also brought to rake the enemy's position. Capt. John G. Hudson, of the Thirty-third Missouri, commanding Battery D, then demanded the surrender of the entire force. The men at once threw down their arms, and Lieutenant-Colonel Johnson, of Bell's regiment [the 37th Arkansas], made a formal surrender of his command, mustering 21 officers and between 300 and 400 men, with all their arms and one stand of colors. At about 10:30 a.m. the main body of the enemy had entirely drawn off from in front of our batteries and the firing ceased.

This testimony was given by Lieutenant-Colonel Cyrus H. Mackey, commanding the 33rd Iowa:

At 8 a.m. they [the Confederates] charged Batteries D and C, bringing forward Generals Fagan's and Parsons' brigades. They succeeded in carrying Battery C, but not until they had many of their men and officers killed and wounded; but their superiority in numbers was so great that they completely overpowered our force at the battery. The three companies from my own regiment and two from the Thirty-third Missouri constituted the entire force at this battery. The men retired from the battery in the direction of Fort Curtis, about 250 yards. By this time we had completely routed the enemy in front of Battery D. They succeeded here only sufficiently to get possession of the extreme left of the rifle-pits. Our force at this battery consisted of six companies of my own regiment, six of the Thirty-third Missouri, and two of the Forty-third Indiana. I now withdrew Companies I and K, and formed a new line with them, and Companies A, F, D, and C, to the rear of Battery C 250 yards, which succeeded completely in stopping any further progress of the enemy. Finding themselves repulsed at all points, they commenced to fall back to the timber. Things at this battery remained in this condition for some time. Many of them, instead of falling back to the timber, took refuge in the woods around the battery, and kept up a desultory fire therefrom. Finding that the enemy was not going to attempt anything more in this direction, I withdrew the two companies I had brought here, and returned to the Little Rock road, in front of Battery D; arriving there I ordered the whole force to charge forward on this road. The entire force advanced with a will that carried everything before them, and in ten minutes I had complete possession of the entire battle-ground on this road and obtained several hundred prisoners and two stand of colors.

Brigade commander Col. Samuel A. Rice (of the 33rd Iowa) never credited any specific unit with the taking of the 37th Arkansas, but the captured colors were credited to his own regiment.

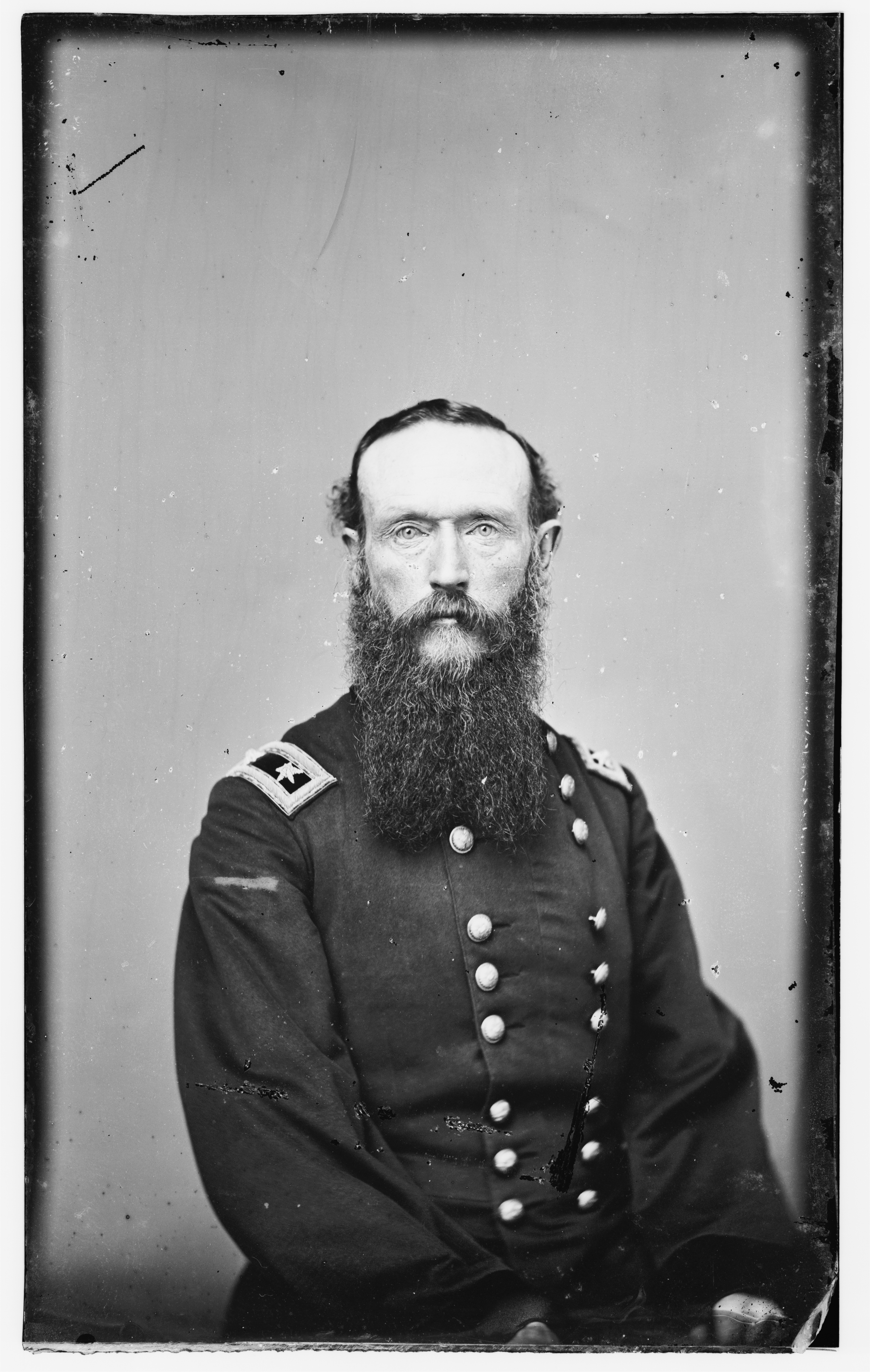
Major General Frederick Steele

=== Capture of Little Rock ===
Not long after the Battle of Helena, Major General Benjamin Prentiss, commanding the Union forces in Arkansas, was replaced by Major General Frederick Steele; his force was renamed the Army of Arkansas. Steele, a seasoned and competent officer who had acquitted himself well under General William T. Sherman's command on the Vicksburg Campaign, immediately set out to capture the Arkansas state capital at Little Rock. Moving west, the Federal army brushed aside Confederate resistance at the Battle of Bayou Fourche (sometimes called the Battle of Little Rock), and occupied Little Rock on 10 September 1863.

== The Camden Expedition ==
=== Initial movements ===
In early 1864, General Grant (who had assumed overall command of all Federal forces) decided to implement a strategy of simultaneous movement against the Confederates on several fronts, from Virginia to Texas. The portion of this assault involving Arkansas, Louisiana and Texas was called the Red River Campaign. The plan called for two separate armies to move simultaneously toward Shreveport, Louisiana, one from the northwest and the other from the southeast. Steele's Army of Arkansas (the smaller of the two) was to move southwest from Little Rock, while a much larger force under Major General Nathaniel P. Banks was to advance up the Red River itself, from New Orleans. The two groups were to link up in Shreveport and advance into Texas, in an effort to take that state out of the war. The Arkansas portion of this campaign was named the Camden Expedition, and it got underway on 23 March 1864 with Steele's departure from the Little Rock Arsenal.

Steele's force initially consisted of the 3rd Division of the VII Corps (including the 43rd Indiana) and two cavalry brigades, totaling about 6,800 men and 76 pieces of artillery. The 43rd was part of the Second Brigade of Brigadier General Salomon's Third Division, and its brigade commander was its own Colonel McLean. Two other regiments were included in the Second Brigade: the 36th Iowa Infantry and the 77th Ohio Infantry.

Steele's first objective was Arkadelphia, Arkansas, which he reached on 29 March. He had ordered Brigadier General John M. Thayer and his 3600 Federals from Fort Smith to join him there, but Thayer failed to arrive on schedule. With his limited rations dwindling, Steele chose to push on in the direction of Camden, where he planned to wait for Thayer, resupply his forces, then continue toward Shreveport.

The Federals were initially opposed by Major General Sterling Price, a Confederate commander from Missouri whom they had previously fought at Helena and who had subsequently been placed in charge of all Southern forces in Arkansas. At this point in the campaign, Price had three cavalry divisions at his disposal containing a total of eight brigades; these were led by three top-noch, battle-hardened commanders: Brigadier Generals John S. Marmaduke, James Fagan and Samuel Maxey. The brigades, while under their assigned strength, were composed largely of seasoned veterans and were well-trained.

=== Battle of Elkin's Ferry ===
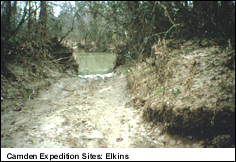
Elkin's Ferry battle site

After tiring of waiting for Thayer to arrive at Arkadelphia, Steele left for Camden on 1 April. He first advanced toward the Little Missouri River in southwest Arkansas. Finding all the bridges destroyed, and being harried by Brigadier General William Cabell's cavalry (which had joined Price's army), Steele ordered Salomon's Third Division to take and hold a to seize a ford known as Elkin's Ferry on the afternoon of 2 April 1864. Salomon in turn tasked the 2nd Brigade commanded by Colonel William McLean of the 43rd Indiana with this objective. McLean initially ordered the entire 36th Iowa Volunteer Infantry, augmented by two companies of the 43rd Indiana across to the south shore. A 2-gun section of 6-pound guns commanded by Lieutenant Charles Peetz of Battery E, 2nd Missouri Light Artillery Battery was also sent across that evening. The 36th Iowa had been the lead division in the 2nd Brigade's marching echelon on that day, and it was thus chosen to cross first, however elements of the 1st Iowa Cavalry had arrived at the crossing well in advance of the 2nd Brigade in mid-afternoon and had moved to the south shore to set up a dismounted picket line a mile and a quarter south from the ford. Three companies of the 36th Iowa—A, D and G--deployed forward a considerable distance from their regiment, under command of Lieutenant-Colonel F.M. Drake and, as nightfall descended, these companies were ordered to sleep on their arms in that forward position. Following a forced march, the 43rd arrived at the crossing after dark that evening.

The morning of 3 April was quiet at the ford and a party of officers and men from the 36th Iowa were ordered out to forage for meat or game, as the entire VII Corps had been placed on a meager issue of half-rations since leaving Little Rock. Returning with 50 small pigs, they spent a quiet morning butchering and distributing the pork to the men. At 1 pm, firing was heard to the front, and as it grew steadily louder, it was clear to Drake at his advance position that a general assault was in progress. At this point McLean ordered a full retreat of his brigade from the south shore, except for 3 companies of the 43rd Indiana. Colonel Charles Kittredge, commanding the 36th Iowa—and Drake's superior—complied with McLean's retreat order, taking the balance of his regiment, 7 companies, to the north shore, and sending a messenger to Drake to do the same. When Drake received the order to pull back, he believed it was not an advisable action under the circumstances and gave the order for Companies A, D and G to "Stand Fast!" Advancing on a personal reconnaissance, Drake discovered the 1st Iowa troopers fully engaged in a hot skirmish a full mile and a quarter from the river. Ordering his 3 companies forward, he directed the 1st Iowa cavalrymen to drop back and join his own firing line. Drake saw that a strong enemy force was in front, and this was confirmed when a Confederate officer rode forward to surrender to Drake under a white flag. Drake ordered a cease fire until the deserter rode across. Realizing he had known the officer before the war, Drake learned from him that he was an aide to rebel General John Marmaduke, and that Marmaduke was present on the field with 2,500 rebel troops. A very hot fight soon resumed, and after two hours the Iowans were driven back only about 80 feet. Drake and his three companies, augmented by three companies of the 43rd Indiana—no more than 600 men—successfully repulsed the Confederate assault on 3 April. Late in the day Marmaduke sent a force through the dense woods to Drake's left in a flanking attempt. Drake ordered the three companies of the 43rd Indian to the left too meet the enemy flanking move and the Indianans repulsed the enemy with heavy enemy losses.

Upon reaching his objective, McLean immediately ordered a squadron of cavalry to cross the shallow river and serve as an advance picket to warn of any Confederate movements toward the river. Sure enough, three cavalry brigades under General Marmaduke—about 7500 troopers altogether—arrived during the night and prepared to assault the Federals at dawn. Marmaduke ordered Brigadier General Joseph Shelby to lead the attack.

In his after-action report, Colonel McLean reported that the enemy probed his lines during the early morning hours; McLean countered by ordering four companies of the 43rd to cross the river and advance into the timber, driving the enemy pickets back while additional elements of the 43rd, supported by the 36th Iowa, crossed behind them and took up positions along the road leading away from the crossing. At 6:00 a.m. on the morning of the 4th, the 43rd and 36th were attacked by Marmaduke's brigade. Though heavily outnumbered, they resisted for two hours before falling back upon their reserves at the ford. McLean's call for reinforcements was met by two additional regiments (the 29th Iowa and the 9th Wisconsin), but before they could be deployed on the battlefield, the enemy withdrew.

Total losses for both sides were slight, with 38 casualties on the Union side, compared to 54 for the Confederates (including 18 killed).

=== Battle of Prairie D'Ane ===
After its victory at Elkin's Ferry, the Army of Arkansas—including the 43rd Indiana—was joined by Thayer's division, which had finally caught up with them on the 9th. This combined force (now totaling about 10,400 effectives) emerged from the forest into an open prairie about 30 square miles in area, known as Prairie D'Ane. To the west lay Washington, the Confederate capital of Arkansas; to the south was the Red River and Shreveport, while the fortified town of Camden sat to the east. Since the 43rd had spearheaded the assault on Elkins' Ferry, Steele relegated it to rear-guard duties during this phase of his army's movement.

Upon entering the prairie, Steele found Marmaduke waiting for him. Guarding the approaches to Washington, the Confederate general had thrown up breastworks in an attempt to delay the oncoming Federals until his commander, General Price, could arrive with the rest of their army. Price had been reinforced by the arrival of Brigadier General Richard Gano's cavalry brigade from the Indian Territory (Oklahoma).

The two sides engaged on 10 April, with the Third Brigade driving the Rebels back about a mile before being stopped. The 43rd Indiana did not arrive on the battlefield until after midnight on the 11th, just in time to join a night battle—a rare event during the Civil War—in which Shelby's Southerners assaulted the Federals, without success. Inconclusive skirmishing continued over the next two days. Believing that Steele intended to capture Washington, Price withdrew most of his forces in the direction of that town; when he realized that the Federals were heading for Camden, instead, he returned to Prairie D'Ane and launched a counterattack on Thayer's division (which was serving as Steele's rearguard) on the 13th. After a four-hour contest, the Confederates were forced to withdraw, and Steele proceeded to occupy Camden after a brief skirmish with Confederate forces there.

=== Poison Spring ===
Upon arriving in Camden, Steele did not find the supplies he had hoped to secure, so he sent 1250 of his men (not including the 43rd) on a foraging expedition to nearby Britton's Mill. There they found a large quantity of corn (supplemented, according to local histories, with items taken from nearby farms and houses), but were ambushed by a sizable Confederate force while transporting it to Camden; the foraging party barely escaped, minus the badly needed food and most of their horses and wagons. Further bad news followed: Steele learned that General Banks had been decisively defeated in Louisiana, and was now in full retreat toward New Orleans. This left Lieutenant General Kirby Smith, commanding all Rebel forces west of the Mississippi River, free to concentrate on Steele's relatively small army, which was trapped deep in enemy territory amidst the snake-infested swamps and forests of south-central Arkansas. Smith accordingly moved three divisions of infantry toward Camden, intending to combine them with Price's forces to drive Steele from Arkansas and perhaps even change the course of the war.

Although Steele was aware of the precarious position he was in, he was determined to hold Camden for as long as he could, in an effort to salvage something from his campaign. On 19 April Smith and his reinforcements arrived at Woodlawn; the newly combined Southern army—now under Smith's direct command—numbered almost 20,000 men, nearly double Steele's force, and was now poised to attack Camden and destroy the Federal Army of Arkansas. Smith immediately ordered Generals Price and Fagan to deploy 4000 cavalry between Camden and Little Rock, to cut off the only route of retreat for Steele. The Confederates set out on 19 April, but news soon reached them that caused them to disobey their orders and turn toward a tiny crossroad named Mark's Mills, instead—resulting in disaster for the 43rd Indiana, but leading to the salvation of the rest of the Federal force.

=== Disaster at Marks' Mills ===
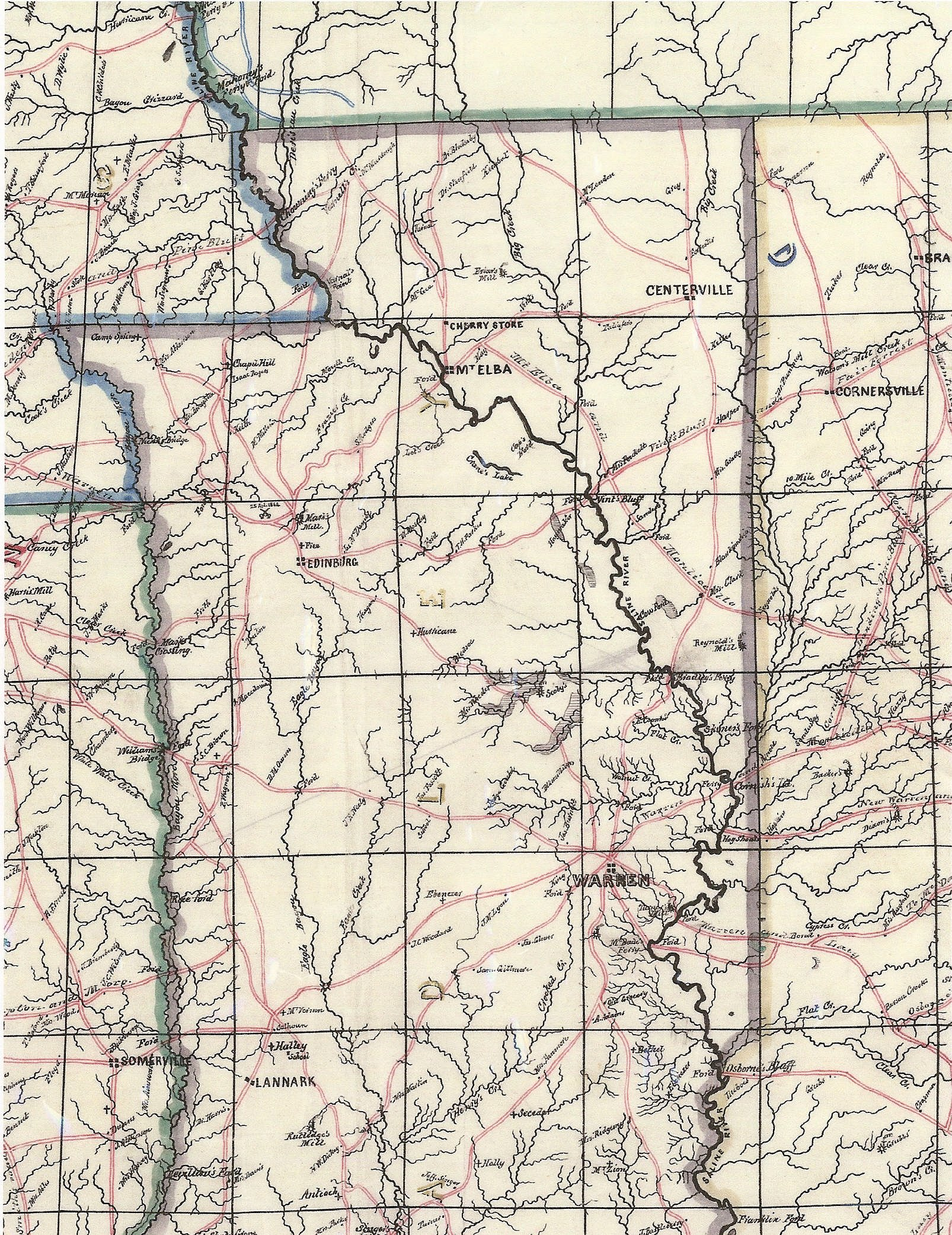
1864 map showing the location of Marks' Mill, just above the village of Edinburg (now New Edinburg)

Running desperately low on supplies, Steele turned to the small Federal base at Pine Bluff, about 35 miles from Camden, as the last remaining source of food for his forces. He accordingly ordered the 43rd Indiana (then down to about 400 men), together with three other regiments and additional cavalry and artillery (around 1800 men in all), to take 400 wagons there on 23 April for supplies. Col. McLean was on a duty assignment at Camden, so command of the regiment fell to Major Wesley W. Norris. The 43rd took the lead, with the wagon train stretching more than a mile along muddy forest roads. Encountering muddy ground along the rain-swollen Morrow River, expedition leader Lieutenant Colonel Francis Drake of the 36th Iowa chose not to push through the mire to Pine Bluff, and instead camped about eight miles outside of town. He did so unaware that two brigades of Price's cavalry with over 4000 troopers were nearby. Though Norris tried to warn Drake of movement in the woods to his front during the night, Drake laughed off his concerns and told Norris—a combat veteran of the Mexican War—that he "got scared too easily."

Early on the morning of 25 April 1864, following a difficult crossing of the Moro, the 43rd and its sister units resumed their march toward Pine Bluff. Soon the 43rd encountered several abandoned Confederate campsites to their front, but reports of a large Confederate presence in the area were discounted by Drake, who "roundly" cursed Major Norris and ordered the regiment to pick up its pace. As the 43rd emerged into a small clearing known as Mark's Mills, it was attacked by Fagan's dismounted brigade, including the 1st Arkansas Cavalry. The Hoosiers drove the Southerners back, but were quickly hit on their right flank by additional Confederates under the command of Brigadier General William Cabell. The 43rd, supported by the 36th Iowa, now found itself facing the 1st Arkansas, together with the 2nd Arkansas and Thomas M. Gunter's cavalry battalion. The 43rd and 36th were forced back toward a few log cabins in the center of the clearing, where their artillery raked the oncoming Southerners and was blasted in return by Hugely's Arkansas Battery.

Just when it seemed that things could not get worse, the 43rd and 36th were now hit on their left flank by Jo Shelby's cavalry, and found themselves fighting an overwhelming force (outnumbering them two-to-one) attacking from three directions at once. Of the 33 members of the 43rd's Co. G who went into the fight, 23 were killed or wounded within the first thirty minutes. Despite valliant efforts by the 77th Ohio and the 1st Iowa Cavalry to prevent the ensuing encirclement, the Federals found themselves surrounded in the clearing and fighting for their lives. The battle lasted for four hours altogether, until they were finally compelled to surrender. One supporting artillery battery was reportedly wiped out to the last man, with its mortally wounded lieutenant firing a final gun into the oncoming Rebels before succumbing to his injuries.

According to Sergeant John Moss of Co. G, the regiment did not give up en masse; rather, continual charges by the Southerners resulted in the capture of small numbers of men each time, until only about 50 of the 43rd remained who had not been killed, wounded, run off or captured. When asked by these last remaining troops to surrender them, Norris refused, saying he would never surrender anyone but himself—and that only if he was forced to. He and the others made for the woods, but Norris' horse was shot out from under him and he lost a boot; he and his comrades were finally forced to give up only 100 yards from Shelby's command. 211 members of the 43rd were taken prisoner; others managed to escape and made their way back to Steele's main force.

=== Aftermath of the battle ===
The 43rd Indiana's regimental history tells of a Federal paymaster with over $175,000 in Greenbacks among those captured at Mark's Mills; the money fell into Confederate hands, and was allegedly used by Southern authorities in a futile attempt to purchase the freedom of Confederate prisoners confined in Chicago, Illinois.

The captured prisoners were robbed of their personal effects, and many were stripped and forced to march into captivity completely naked. The Confederates left the Union dead on the field for three days before any attempt was made to bury them, while several African American civilians accompanying the column were shot down in cold blood after the battle. The prisoners were marched south to Camp Ford in Tyler, Texas, where many died before the whole group was released in 1865. Although Colonel Drake would later go on to a successful political career in his home state of Iowa, including winning the Governorship of that state, the regimental historian of the 36th Iowa wrote that the men of the 43rd Indiana held him in supreme contempt long after the war, for "leading them straight into ambush by his dithering indecisiveness" at Mark's Mills.

Confederate General Cabell paid tribute to the courage and tenacity exhibited by his enemies during the battle. "[My] men," he wrote, "never fought better. They whipped the best infantry regiments that the enemy had—'old Veterans', as they were called... The killed and wounded of Cabells Brigade shows how stubborn the enemy was, and how reluctantly they gave up the train." Nevertheless, the debacle at Mark's Mills is considered by some historians to be the worst defeat ever suffered by Federal forces west of the Mississippi.

Ironically, the disastrous defeat at Mark's Mills was credited with saving the remainder of Steele's army from annihilation. Fagan and Shelby had been ordered to get between Steele's force and its original base at Little Rock; had they done so, there is no question that their overwhelming numbers, combined with additional units advancing under their commander Kirby Smith, would have surrounded Steele and compelled his destruction or surrender. By disobeying their orders and engaging Drake's brigade at Mark's Mills, Shelby and Fagan caused a delay in the Rebel advance that proved to be just long enough for Steele to evacuate Camden (which he did, immediately after hearing of the disaster his forces had suffered) and lead the battered remnants of his Army of Arkansas to safety.

=== Camp Ford, Texas ===
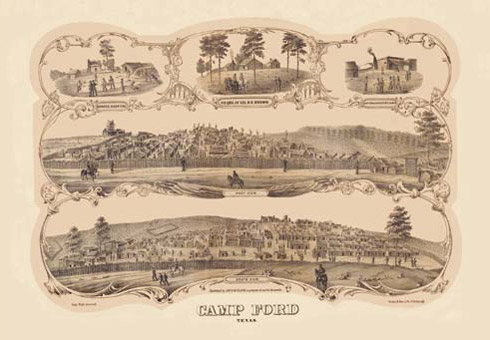
Lithograph of Camp Ford in Tyler, Texas, drawn by James Mc'Lain, a former prisoner of war in the camp

In the regimental history, Sgt. Moss relates that the captured members of the 43rd Indiana were taken together with the remaining prisoners to Camden, which Steele had evacuated the previous day. There they were housed in an old cotton barn, under the command of a Confederate Major named Hill, whom Moss credited with being a "gentlemen, and treated us the best he could under the circumstances." The prisoners were marched first to Shreveport, then to Tyler, Texas, home to Camp Ford, the main Confederate POW camp for that district.

Upon arrival at the prison camp, Moss and the others quickly learned that their new home was an eleven-acre compound surrounded by a log palisade sixteen feet high. Inside the prison, a line was drawn around the premises ten feet from the fence, called the "dead line;" anyone crossing that line was subject to be shot by the guards. No barracks of any kind were available, so the Federal prisoners were forced to live and sleep outdoors until the Confederate commandant permitted some of them to gather brush from outside to construct crude shelters. Food rations were issued in the evening, according to Moss, and consisted of corn meal, which was first poured out on a blanket, then distributed with three-quart cups. Cattle were sometimes brought into the enclosure and shot by the guards; the prisoners were issued one axe and three pocketknives to cut up the meat, which was then distributed among them.

Moss reports that he was able to forge passes to leave the camp, which he used to help several of his fellow prisoners escape. One captured escapee was strung up until he was near death, then let down, revived and then hanged over and over again because he refused to divulge who had helped him escape. Ultimately, Moss got out of the camp himself, and after several harrowing experiences managed to reach Federal lines in Little Rock, with help from a few Union sympathizers he met along the way. Upon arrival, he and his companions were taken to General Steele, who 'received us with hospitality' and ordered his commissary to supply them with whatever they needed, after which they were furloughed. The remaining members of the 43rd who survived Camp Ford were released in 1865 and reunited with their regiment, which had by that time returned to Indiana.

=== Retreat from Camden ===
Meanwhile, as the captured members of the 43rd Indiana were being moved to Camp Ford after the Battle of Marks' Mills, the small portion of the regiment that had managed to escape made its way back to Camden, where General Steele now prepared to evacuate the town in great haste. These men were combined with members of the 36th Iowa into a Casual Detachment, under the command of Captain Marmaduke Darnall of the 43rd's Co. B.

Knowing the precariousness of his situation, Steele decided to beat a hasty retreat all the way back to Little Rock, where substantial Federal fortifications and garrison troops could shelter him. First, however, he had to cross the Saline River, which had been flooded by the spring rains, before the Confederates (consisting of Holmes', Walker's, Fagan's, and Shelby's units, plus Smith's own divisions and a newly arrived Texas division under John G. Walker) could stop him. Unknown to Steele, his adversary had already suffered a couple of setbacks. Two of Kirby Smith's cavalry brigades had to be dispatched to Oklahoma to deal with reported Federal threats in that region, while his other units saw every effort they made to get between the fleeing Federals and the Saline River stymied by the speed of their march or topographical hindrances.

=== Battle of Jenkins' Ferry ===
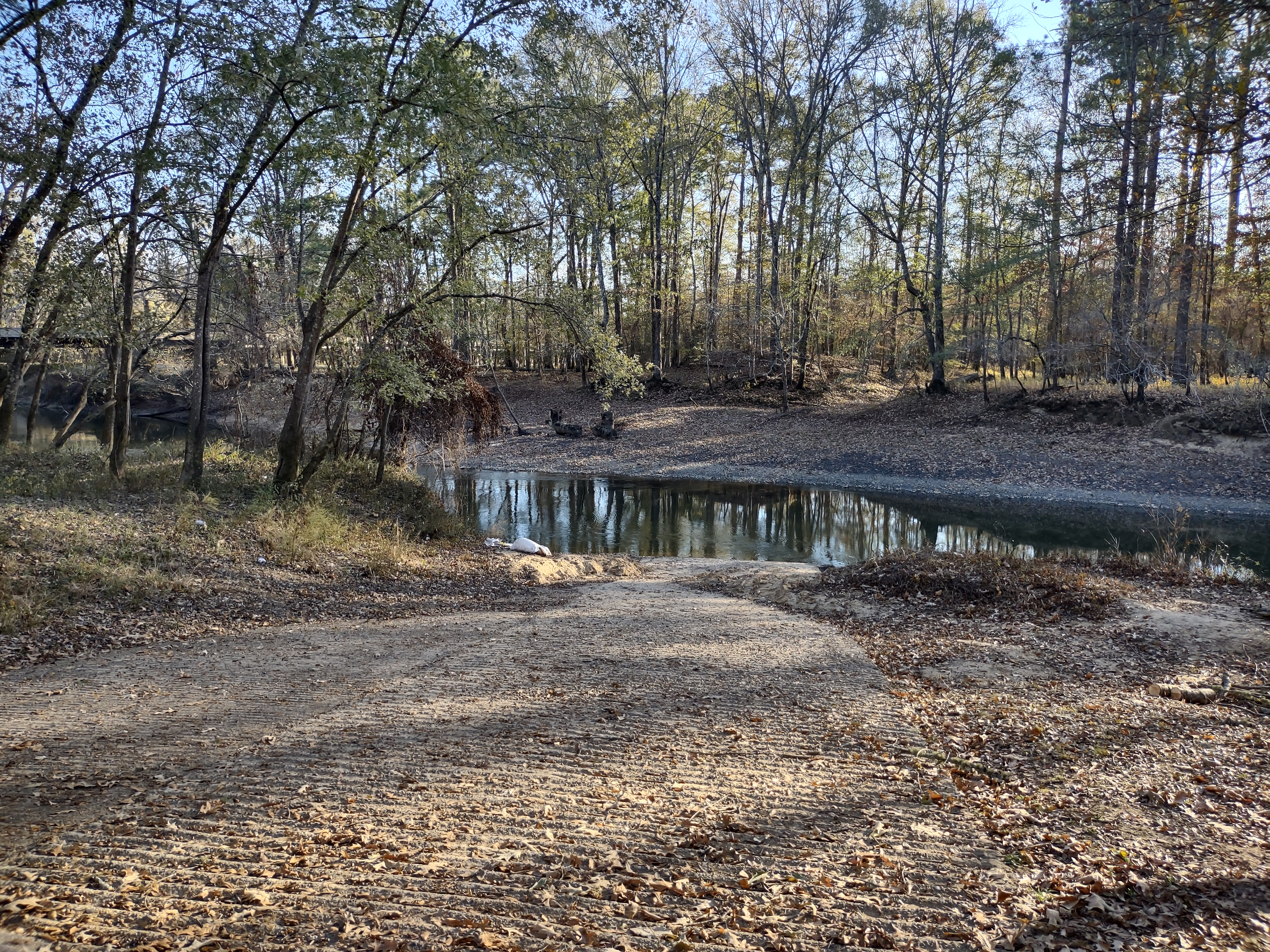
The site of the Battle of Jenkins' Ferry. At the time of the battle, the river was much wider than this, due to heavy spring rains and flooding.

The Federal army reached the Saline at a crossing called Jenkins' Ferry at 2pm on 29 April, with heavy rains turning an already soggy river bottom into a sea of nearly impassable mud. With their regiments and wagon train strung out through the swampy timber along the riverbank, the Federals struggled to erect a pontoon bridge to get their artillery and supply trains to safety. Knowing that he would be unable to cross all his wagon train before dark and that Smith's army was rapidly closing on his position, Steele ordered his men to construct breastworks on the Confederate side of the river, in anticipation of an imminent attack. 4000 Federal troops under Brigadier General Samuel Rice were ordered to man these fortifications, and hold off the Southerners until Steele and the rest of the army could get over. The Federal cavalry and about half of the supply train managed to cross under cover of darkness, but the remainder were still waiting to cross when dawn broke. In the coming battle, the remnants of the 43rd Indiana would fight under the direct command of General Salomon, Rice's immediate superior.

Colonel McLean describes the situation:

It may be said that the rains of Heaven, which fell during the night and morning of the Battle of Jenkins' Ferry, overflowing the bottoms of the Saline River, rendering it impossible for the Confederates to flank Steele, was the contributing factor in his escape. The night preceding the 'Battle Royal' was a fearful one. Lightning flashed, thunder rolled, rain poured down in torrents, and the river bottom became a sea of mud. The battle was a fearful and obstinate contest. Ankle deep in mud and mire, the contending forces stood for more than six hours, shooting each other down in their tracks and filling the morass with the dead and dying. Never was an army in greater peril. Never was an army saved by more heroic endurance and determined bravery.

The Confederates, having brought up their forces during the night, started their attack before dawn on the morning of 30 April. They quickly found that the Federals were hidden behind strong fortifications with impenetrable timber and swamp on their flanks, leaving only about 400 yards of open ground for the attackers to advance through. The Southern advantage in numbers was largely negated as they were forced to attack with only one brigade at a time; these troops sank up to their knees in muck as they staggered through the thick smoke, fog, pouring rain and murderous Federal fire toward the Union line, with only limited artillery and cavalry support due to the conditions. Two Confederate Brigadiers were killed and another badly wounded during the assault, while General Rice was also mortally wounded on the Union side. But his stubborn resistance paid off: by 3:00 pm that afternoon, Steele's army had crossed the Saline with their artillery and supply train, though 900 wagons reportedly had to be left behind. Federal infantry and artillery now deployed on the other bank of the river, to protect the rearguard as they crossed in turn; the pontoon bridge was then destroyed behind them, making it impossible for Smith and his Southerners to pursue any further. Three days later, Steele's tattered remnants limped into the safety of Little Rock; McLean reported that "the retreat presented no evidence of order, the troops not marching by companies or in their proper organizations, but every man was apparently animated by the sole purpose to save himself."

Colonel McLean spoke very highly of the courage and fighting skill manifested by the "Arkansas Colored Regiment" (the 2nd Kansas Colored Infantry), which was made up of recently liberated slaves, at Jenkins' Ferry. Admitting that he and others had wondered how these men might perform under fire, McLean spoke glowingly of their "cool courage" and "noble service" as they charged "with a whoop and a yell" against the oncoming Confederates, shouting "here comes your Ironclads!" as they did so.

According to McLean, total losses for Steele's Army of Arkansas were 5000 men killed, wounded or captured, out of an original force of about 12,000 men. He also lost 2000 wagons to the enemy, together with 5000 horses and mules; out of 76 pieces of artillery Steele started out with, less than six made it back with him to Little Rock. McLean's own 2nd brigade, including the 43rd Indiana, 36th Iowa and 77th Ohio, had less than 300 men fit for duty, after the campaign was over.

== Return to Indiana ==
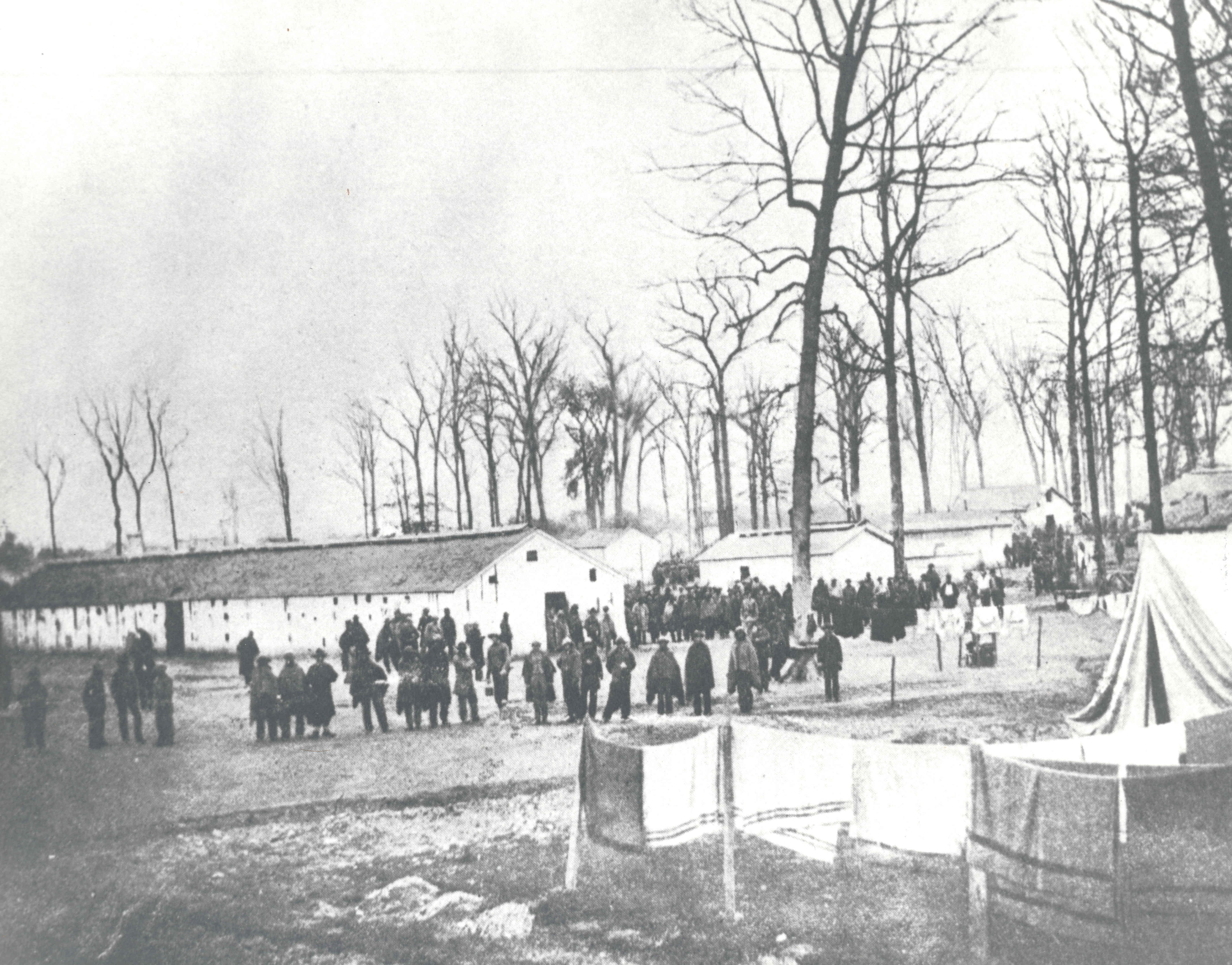
Camp Morton, the final wartime assignment for the 43rd Indiana.

=== Kentucky ===
After their return to Little Rock, the remnants of the 43rd Indiana were furloughed for thirty days and sent to Indianapolis, where they were welcomed by Governor Morton and other Indiana notables. They were asked to delay their trips home to go to Frankfort, Kentucky, to help defend that city against a possible raid by Confederate General John Hunt Morgan. The 43rd accordingly set out for the Bluegrass State, but Morgan's attack failed to materialize, so the 43rd returned to Louisville to await further orders. Near Eminence, Kentucky, the regiment engaged in a slight skirmish with some local guerrillas that would prove to be their last combat of the war.

=== Camp Morton ===
Upon their return to Indiana, the veteran members of the 43rd were allowed to take their furlough, and then they were augmented with fresh recruits and assigned to new duty at Camp Morton in Indianapolis, a Federal prison camp. Here they spent the rest of the war guarding Confederate prisoners, though Colonel McLean repeatedly requested a return to the front for himself and his men—just so long as it wasn't Arkansas. Four times, the War Department issued appropriate transfer orders, but each time, Governor Morton and others used their political connections to ensure that the regiment remained where it was. During the Nashville Campaign of Confederate Lieutenant General John Bell Hood, the 43rd volunteered for service with the forces defending Tennessee under General George Thomas, but again, they were ordered to stay at Camp Morton.

In March 1865, the members of the regiment being held at Camp Ford were released, and rejoined the regiment in Indianapolis. On 14 July 1865, the regiment was mustered out of Federal service at Camp Morton, and sent home.

== Regimental anecdotes ==
=== "Foraging" ===
Throughout history, soldiers have told ofttimes humorous tales of their experiences while serving in war, and the men of the 43rd Indiana were no different. Private James Gilmore, of Co. H, shared some anecdotes in the regimental history. He reports, for instance, that some members of the regiment would resort to an elaborate subterfuge in their efforts to augment their rations. While on the march, during mid-afternoon, a private would hand his rifle to one of his companions, then slip silently out of the ranks and disappear. Later, two additional soldiers would drop out from the same company, this time while carrying their rifles. Later that evening, when the regiment went into camp, the three soldiers would reappear, with the first carrying a pig, sheep, chickens or some other food item stolen from local citizens. When stopped by the guards, the two armed soldiers would identify themselves as having just captured a forager, and would be passed through the lines without further ado to take their 'prisoner' to the provost. Needless to say, after much wandering about unsuccessfully 'trying' to find headquarters, the three would simply slip back to their unit, where they and their friends would make quick work of their ill-gotten gains.

=== Infantry vs. cavalry ===
On another occasion, Gilmore reports coming upon some cavalry at a Kentucky plantation, where they had dragged a large piano from the house and one of them was trying to make his horse play it with his hooves. "While we were watching this uncalled-for and forbidden piece of vandalism," he writes, "there was a sudden commotion among the horsemen." A group of infantrymen from the 43rd had located several bee hives to the rear of the mansion, and had grabbed the bee gums and come running around the side of the house, with bees streaming out of the hives behind them. Dashing straight through the startled troopers, the footsloggers noted with delight that the bees attacked the miscreant horsemen, while they carried off the honeycombs and consumed them at their leisure.

=== The beer monopoly ===
Gillmore reports that instead of establishing a regular canteen, it was the custom in the Federal Army for each regimental commander to designate one man to sell beer to his comrades for a period of time, after which another man would be named to the same position for the same period. This franchise was highly coveted, as its holder had a chance to make a profit from his monopoly. A certain "Joe M." was accordingly designated; he procured a barrel of beer, took it to the back of his tent and set up shop, selling beer for ten cents per glass. One customer objected to this price, informing Joe that he had just bought beer at a different location for only five cents. Outraged (as he was supposed to be the only man selling alcohol at that time), Joe demanded to be taken to see his competitor, upon which he was led outside and behind his tent, where a comrade had cut a small hole through the canvas, tapped the barrel from the outside, and was selling Joe's own beer at five cents per glass. According to Gillmore: "that end of the beer saloon was suddenly and effectively closed."

=== Federal 'coffee' and 'whiskey' ===
Sadly, not all pranks pulled by members of the 43rd were in good humor. Gillmore reports that certain members of the regiment saw an opportunity to make extra money due to the scarcity of coffee in the South during the Civil War. He reports that soldiers of an entire company would pool their rations of coffee, boil it all until all the liquid had been gotten out of the grains, then keep the coffee for their own use while selling the useless grains (after drying them for a time) to local citizens at the extraordinary price of one dollar per pound. Complaints to regimental officers and provosts were laughed off, said Gillmore, and the whole episode simply "winked at" by those in authority.

In another episode, three members of the 43rd met up with a local Southerner named "Pat," who ran an illegal saloon close to the regimental camp. Considering him to be "legitimate prey" on account of the exorbitantly high prices he charged for his merchandise, they secretly conspired with him to supply one 40-gallon barrel of stolen whiskey for the price of five dollars per gallon. The soldiers took an empty 40-gallon barrel, filled up a one-quart canteen with whiskey, then fitted the neck of the canteen through the bunghole, hooked a brass faucet to it, and sealed it. They filled the remainder of the barrel with 39 gallons and 3 quarts of water, then took it hurriedly to their unsuspecting partner in crime. Insisting that they had to beat feet, the unscrupulous Yankees demanded that their victim take a taste, then pay them the $200 cash he had promised to give them. He turned the tap (connected to the canteen of whiskey), took a quick swig, then shook the barrel to ensure that it was full. Satisfied, he handed over the cash and the miscreant Hoosiers skedaddled. As Gillmore explains, Pat had assumed the whiskey was stolen, and since he had previously agreed to receive what he knew to be stolen property, he dared not report the fraud to the regimental authorities.

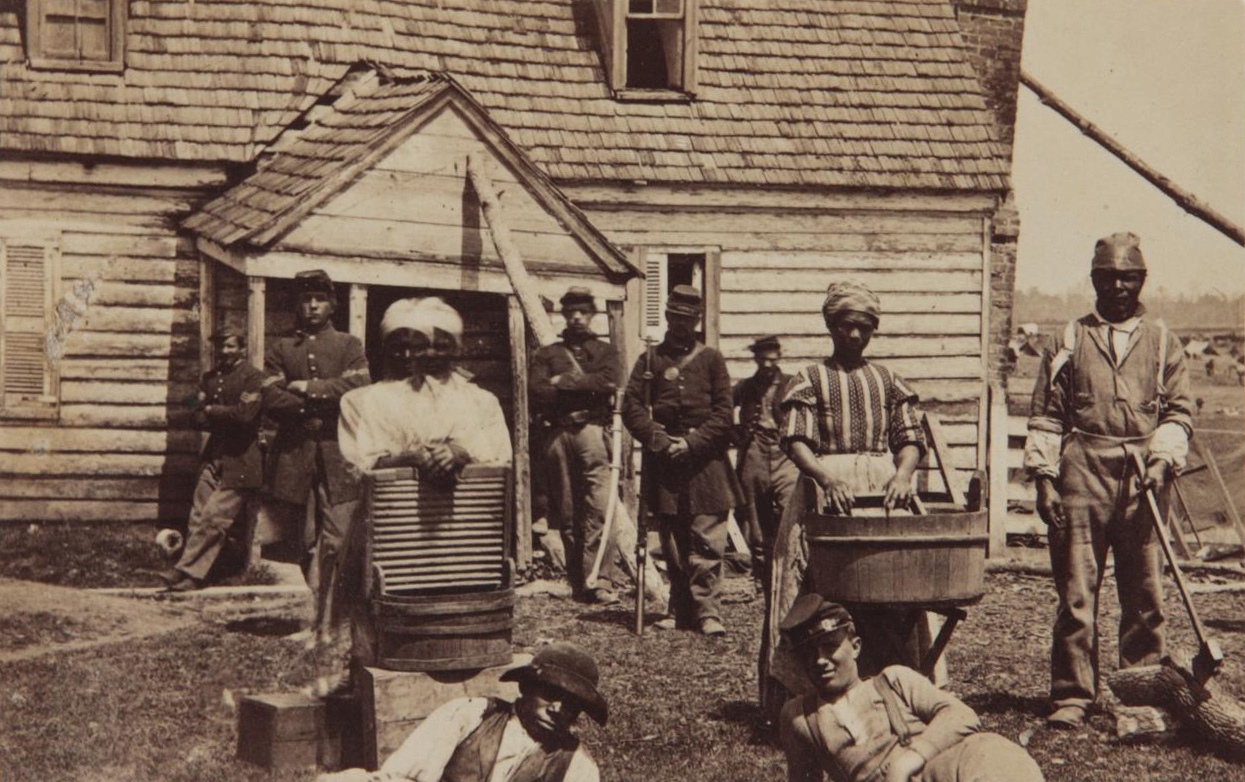
Escaped slaves, c. 1862, in the Eastern Theater

=== 'Levy contributions' ===
Sometimes, pranks played by soldiers turned into indefensible crimes. As with most Federal units, the 43rd usually had a sizable number of African American 'contrabands' (runaway slaves) living near its camps whenever it was in garrison. Some of its more unscrupulous members would shamelessly defraud these poor refugees of any money they might possess. Gillmore reports that one soldier dreamed up a scheme in which he would walk around with a ledger in his hand, inquiring for the name of any black men he happened to meet. Upon receiving an answer he would open the ledger, pretend to look for his name, then inform the man "in an authoritative tone" that the government demanded that he work thirty days on the fortifications, or else pay this soldier (as its 'representative') ten dollars in cash. Anyone who refused, said he, would be sent beyond Federal lines and left to the mercy of the Confederates. The hapless freedman, feeling himself to be without recourse, would give all the money he had to the grifting soldier to have his name removed from the fictitious 'list.' Eventually, reports Gillmore, the practitioners of this scam (and there were more than one) were discovered and court-martialled, after which it ceased.

=== Whiskey commandos ===
Unlike beer, whiskey was utterly forbidden to the men of the 43rd while in the field. During their sojourn in Helena, Arkansas, several members of the regiment were detailed to unload a shipment of whiskey for the commissary, which was rolled into a large warehouse that had been built on stilts over the Mississippi River. Gillmore reports that one enterprising soldier had mentally measured the precise location of the whiskey barrels, so carefully that later that night, he and some friends made their way past the guards to the underside of the building, where they bored a hole through the flooring, straight up into one of the barrels. The whiskey was then allowed to flow through the hole into "camp kettles, mess pans and canteens," which were quietly taken back to the regimental billet. The perpetrators of this daring raid were never discovered, and Gillmore reports that "the wholle affair was regarded as a joke upon the Commissary, who probably squared his shortage by reporting the whiskey as 'captured.'"

=== Biblical bacon ===
Gillmore reports that bacon rations were usually delivered to the regiment in large hogsheads, weighing between six hundred and twelve hundred pounds apiece. The bacon was packed into the barrels at its point of origin by a man whose initials were "B.C."; accordingly, these initials were stamped onto each barrel, together with its precise weight. On one occasion, a certain Sergeant came with a detail of men to collect his Company's bacon ration. One of the soldiers picked out a barrel labelled '1145 B.C.', upon which his Sergeant told him to leave that one and take the one marked '736 B.C.'

"That was packed 1145 years before Christ," the non-com explained; "we want bacon as fresh as we can get it."

== Unit assignments ==
During its service (starting 12 October 1861), the 43rd Indiana was assigned to the following units:

- October to December, 1861: 14th Brigade, Army of the Ohio.
- December, 1861 to February, 1862: 14th Brigade, 5th Division, Army of the Ohio.
- February to April, 1862: 1st Brigade, 2nd Division, Army of Mississippi.
- April to July, 1862: 2nd Brigade, 3rd Division, Army of Mississippi.
- July to December, 1862: Helena, Arkansas, District of Eastern Arkansas, Department of Missouri.
- December, 1862 to January, 1863: 1st Brigade, 2nd Division, District of Eastern Arkansas, Department of the Tennessee.
- January to February, 1863: 1st Brigade, 12th Division, XIII Corps, Army of the Tennessee.
- February to July, 1863: 1st Brigade, 13th Division, XIII Corps.
- July to August, 1863: 1st Brigade, 13th Division, XVI Corps (served in this unit during the Arkansas Expedition in August, 1863).
- August, 1863 to January, 1864: 1st Brigade, 3rd Division, Arkansas Expedition.
- January to April, 1864: 1st Brigade, 3rd Division, VII Corps, Department of Arkansas.
- April to May, 1864: 2nd Brigade, 3rd Division, VII Corps (for the Camden Expedition).
- July, 1864 to July, 1865: Assigned to guard duty at Camp Morton, Indiana.
- Mustered out: 14 July 1865.

== Commanders ==
- Colonel George Kirkpatrick Steele.
- Colonel William Edward McLean.
- Colonel John Kirkpatrick Major.

== See also ==
- List of Indiana Civil War regiments
- Indiana in the Civil War
