= Battle of Marks' Mills =

1864 battle of the American Civil War

- Part of the American Civil War
Date	April 25, 1864 (162 years ago)
Location	Cleveland County, Arkansas 33°46′52″N 92°15′25″W
Result	Confederate victory

Belligerents
Confederate States	United States (Union)

Commanders and leaders
(Confederate States of America) James F. Fagan	(United States) Francis M. Drake

Strength
8,000	1,800

Casualties and losses
293	1,500
- Location in Arkansas Marks' Mills (the United States)

The Battle of Marks' Mills (April 25, 1864), also known as the Action at Marks’ Mills, was fought in present-day Cleveland County, Arkansas, during the American Civil War. Confederate Brigadier-General James F. Fagan, having made a forced march, attacked a train of several hundred wagons, guarded by a brigade of infantry, 500 cavalry, and a section of light artillery under command of Lieutenant-Colonel Francis M. Drake of the 36th Iowa, on its way from Camden to Pine Bluff for supplies.

Drake had a reputation as an Indian fighter; in 1852 at the age of 19, he led a wagon train from Blakesburg, Iowa, to Sacramento, California, and, while crossing the Nebraska prairie, his train was attacked by an estimated 300 Pawnee warriors. Drake organized and led a spirited defense of his train and, although greatly outnumbered, he and seven companions beat the attackers off, reportedly after Drake personally killed their leader with his knife. At the outbreak of the Civil War, Drake was appointed captain of a cavalry company of Lieutenant Colonel John Edwards' Southern Iowa Border Brigade. Drake participated in numerous skirmishes with that command while clearing northern Missouri of confederates and was rewarded with an appointment as commander of the federal supply depot at Hannibal, Missouri. When the 36th Iowa was organized in September 1862, Iowa Governor Samuel Kirkwood appointed Drake Lieutenant Colonel of that regiment. The 36th were veterans, having participated in the Yazoo Pass Expedition, February–April 1863, the Battle of Helena, July 4, 1863, as well as in every skirmish and battle of the Camden Expedition, including the Battle of Elkins Ferry, April 3–4, 1863, where Drake was in command of the advanced troops of General Fred Steele, who forced the crossing of the Little Missouri River, holding the crossing with only two battalions of infantry against 2,500 Confederates.

== Background ==
Following the Federal defeat at the Battle of Poison Spring on April 18, 1864, Major-General Frederick Steele retained possession of Camden while Confederate Major-General Sterling Price continued his ad hoc siege upon Camden from the countryside. As Federal provisions diminished, arrival of much-needed supplies from Pine Bluff convinced Steele that more could be obtained using the Camden-Pine Bluff Road. Steele ordered Drake with over 1,400 infantrymen, artillery and cavalry support, and 240 army wagons to obtain supplies from Pine Bluff. Reinforced on the morning of April 25, 1864, by some 350 additional troops, Drake's command contained approximately 1,800 combatants, including the 43rd Indiana, 36th Iowa and the 77th Ohio plus additional cavalry and artillery.

In addition to the army wagons, some 75 additional civilian wagons belonging to cotton speculators followed along behind. General Steele had strongly instructed Lieutenant-Colonel Drake not to attempt a crossing of the Moro Bayou bottom—a few miles west of Marks' Mills—after nightfall. According to Captain Samuel Swiggett of the 36th Iowa, as the supply train approached the bottom on Sunday afternoon, Drake was confronted with a nearly impassible road through the bottom due to flooding caused by recent heavy spring rainfall. Additionally, according to Swiggett, the civilian teamsters tagging along behind were growing argumentative and hard to handle due to the slow pace. Drake therefore ordered the train into encampment in a field on the side of the road west of Moro crossing at 2 pm, and meanwhile ordered several dozen Black contrabands accompanying the train forward as pioneers to begin cutting down timber and laying a corduroy road across the muddy bottom. Others, including members of the 43rd Indiana, stated later that the train went into camp closer to 4pm. Regardless of the precise time, it is likely—as Swiggett pointed out—that the entire train could have crossed the Moro Bottom by evening. Union General Powell Clayton, in command at Pine Bluff, knew that Steele would be sending more wagons to Pine Bluff for additional supplies and he had posted some of his troops at Mount Elba, halfway between Marks' Mills and Pine Bluff, to provide escort for any federal trains enroute Pine Bluff. It is Swiggett's contention, therefore, that had Drake pressed on that Sunday afternoon, the train would have successfully crossed Moro bottom and could have been well on its way up the Pine Bluff Road to Mount Elba by nightfall. Swiggett reported that as they lay in camp on the west bank of the Moro, all experienced a feeling or foreboding. Swiggett's opinion is supported by the fact that the Confederate forces had crossed the Ouachita River well below Camden and made an all-night forced march of 52 miles on 24 Apri in order to get in front of Drake's command, and consequently the Confederates had just barely arrived at the ambush site in force early Monday morning and they were still sorting out their ambush plan when Drake's command crossed the Moro and continued up the road into the clearing at Marks' Mills. Thus, had Drake pressed forward on Sunday instead of going into camp in mid-afternoon, it is very possible that the train would have been well ahead of the ambush site by 8:00 am on Monday morning and within range of Clayton's cavalry escort posted at Mount Elba.

The 43rd took the lead, with the wagon train stretching more than a mile along muddy forest roads. Encountering mirey ground along the rain-swollen Moro River, Colonel Drake chose not to push through to Pine Bluff, and instead camped about eight miles outside of town. He did so unaware that two brigades of Price's cavalry with over 5000 troopers were nearby. Though Major Wesley Norris tried to warn Drake of movement in the woods to his front during the night, Drake laughed off his concerns and told Norris—a combat veteran of the Mexican War—that he "got scared too easily."

Although Drake was roundly criticized later by surviving soldiers of the 2nd Brigade—particularly men of the 43rd Indiana—Drake had proven his bravery in many previous fights, and indeed, he suffered a serious gun-shot wound to his hip while directing his men at Marks' Mills and was carried from the field.

== Battle ==
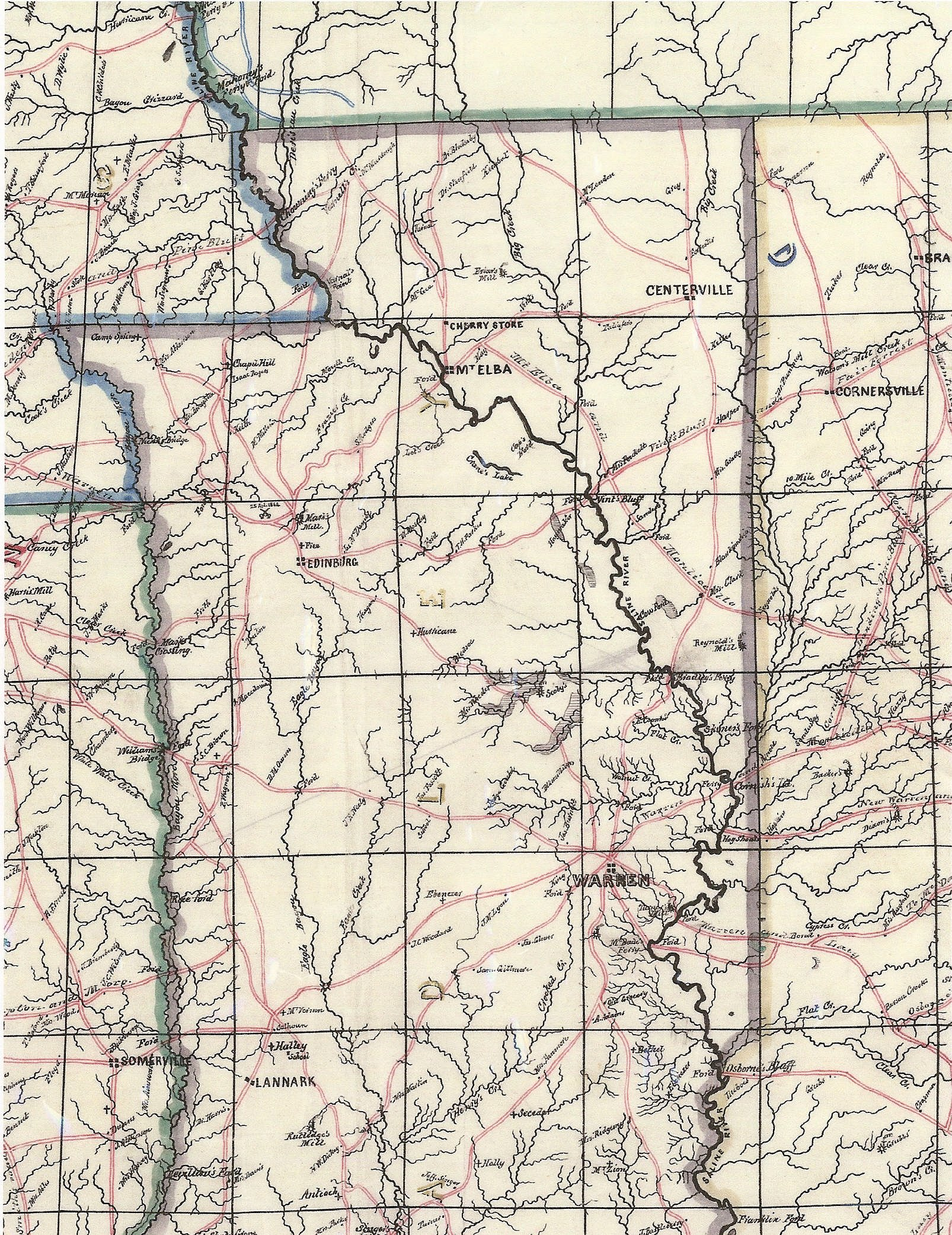
An 1864 map showing the local geography, with Marks' Mill defending the approach to Mount Elba, Arkansas.

Early on the morning of April 25, 1864, following a difficult crossing of the Moro, the 43rd and its sister units resumed their march toward Pine Bluff. Soon the 43rd encountered several abandoned Confederate campsites to their front, but reports of a large Confederate presence in the area were discounted by Drake, who "roundly" cursed Major Norris and ordered the regiment to pick up its pace. As the 43rd emerged into a small clearing known as Marks' Mills, it was attacked by Fagan's dismounted brigade, including the 1st Arkansas Cavalry. The Hoosiers drove the Southerners back, but were quickly hit on their right flank by additional Confederates under the command of Brigadier-General William Cabell. The 43rd, supported by the 36th Iowa, now found itself facing the 1st Arkansas, together with the 2nd Arkansas and Thomas Gunter's cavalry battalion. The 43rd and 36th were forced back toward a few log cabins in the center of the clearing, where their artillery raked the oncoming Southerners and was blasted in return by Hugely's Arkansas Battery.

Just when it seemed that things could not get worse, the 43rd and 36th were now hit on their left flank by Jo Shelby's cavalry, and found themselves fighting an overwhelming force (outnumbering them two-to-one) attacking from three directions at once. Of the 33 members of the 43rd's Co. G who went into the fight, 23 were killed or wounded within the first thirty minutes. Despite valiant efforts by the 77th Ohio and the 1st Iowa Cavalry to prevent the ensuing encirclement, the Federals found themselves surrounded in the clearing and fighting for their lives. The battle lasted for four hours altogether, until they were finally compelled to surrender. One supporting artillery battery was reportedly wiped out to the last man, with its mortally wounded lieutenant firing a final gun into the oncoming Rebels before succumbing to his injuries.

According to Sergeant John Moss of the 43rd Indiana's Co. G, the regiment did not give up en masse; rather, continual charges by the Southerners resulted in the capture of small numbers of men each time, until only about 50 of the 43rd remained who had not been killed, wounded, run off or captured. When asked by these last remaining troops to surrender them, Norris refused, saying he would never surrender anyone but himself—and that only if he was forced to. He and the others made for the woods, but Norris' horse was shot out from under him and he lost a boot; he and his comrades were finally forced to give up only 100 yards from Shelby's command. 211 members of the 43rd were taken prisoner; others managed to escape and made their way back to Steele's main force.

== Aftermath ==
The Confederates estimated 41 killed, 108 wounded, and 144 missing. The Federal numbers are more difficult to determine because the entire column was captured; approximations range from 1,133 to 1,600. Additionally, the Confederates seized 150 African Americans and were accused of killing at least 100 others during or after the assault. The loss of additional men and wagons, as well as the further depletion of Federal supplies in Camden, seriously challenged Steele's position and combined with the arrival of Lt. Gen. Kirby Smith's command to force Steele to abandon Camden on April 26, 1864, and march northward toward Little Rock.

Following the battle, a Federal soldier in the 36th Iowa commented that, "The Rebs robbed nearly every man of us even to our chaplain. They stripped every stitch of clothes, even their shirts, boots and socks, and left the dead unburied and the woods on fire. Clothing was also pulled from the wounded as they begged for mercy. No respect was given for persons rank or age. Old Captain Charles Moss of the 43rd Indiana Infantry was marched bareheaded with his bald head and white locks and beard in the burning sun." Federal records indicate that some 190 infantrymen and cavalrymen escaped and made their way overland to report in at the Federal Depot at Pine Bluff or made it all the way to Little Rock. Colonel William McLean, commanding the brigade of which the three Federal regiments had been a part, wrote that some captured prisoners were stripped and forced to march into captivity completely naked. The Confederates reportedly left the Federal dead on the field for three days before any attempt was made to bury them, according to McLean.

Most of the soldiers captured from the 36th Iowa, 43rd Indiana, 77th Ohio and Peetz's Battery of the 1st Missouri Light Artillery were marched to Tyler, Texas, where they were incarcerated at a prison stockade at Camp Ford. Many died there over the next year from malnutrition and disease, but there were several successful escapes. Most of the prisoners remaining alive were released in 1865.

The 43rd Indiana's regimental history tells of a Federal paymaster with over $175,000 in Greenbacks among those captured at Marks' Mills; the money fell into Confederate hands, and was supposedly used by Southern authorities in a futile attempt to purchase the freedom of Confederate prisoners confined in Chicago.

Cabell paid tribute to the courage and tenacity exhibited by his enemies during the battle. "Men," he wrote, "never fought better. They whipped the best infantry regiments that the enemy had—'old Veterans', as they were called... The killed and wounded of Cabell's Brigade shows how stubborn the enemy was, and how reluctantly they gave up the train." Neverthtless, the debacle at Marks' Mills is considered by some historians to be the worst defeat ever suffered by Federal forces west of the Mississippi.

Ironically, the disastrous defeat at Marks' Mills was credited with saving the remainder of Steele's army from annihilation. Fagan and Shelby had been ordered to get between Steele's force and its original base at Little Rock; had they done so, there is no question that their overwhelming numbers, combined with additional units advancing under their commander Kirby Smith, would have surrounded Steele and compelled his destruction or surrender. By disobeying General Smith's orders and engaging Drake's brigade at Marks' Mills, Shelby and Fagan caused a delay in the Rebel advance that proved to be just long enough for Steele to evacuate Camden and lead the battered remnants of his force to safety. Although Colonel Drake would later go on to a successful political career in his home state of Iowa, including winning the governorship of that state, the regimental historian of the 36th Iowa wrote that the men of the 43rd Indiana held him in extreme contempt long after the war, for "leading them straight into ambush by his dithering indecisiveness" at Marks' Mills.

== See also ==
- List of American Civil War battles
- Troop engagements of the American Civil War, 1864
