= Charles W. Adams (Union general) =

Officer in the Union Army during the American Civil War

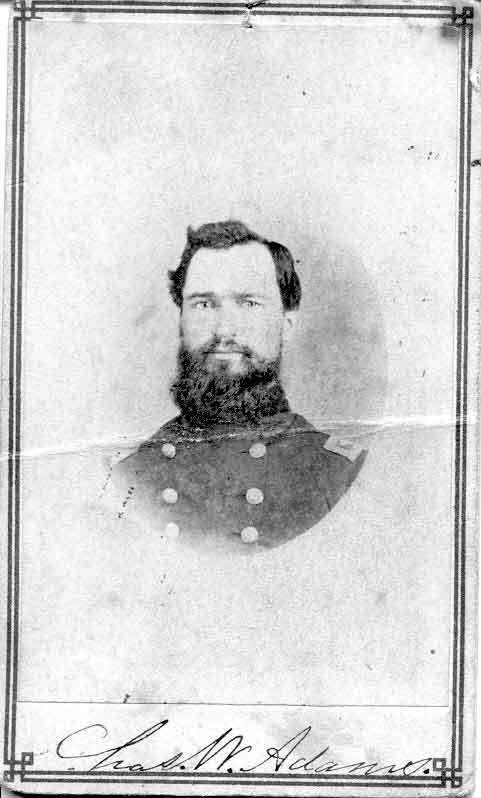
- Adams in 1863
- Born: May 31, 1834; Massachusetts, U.S.
- Died: March 8, 1909 (aged 74); Oakland, California, U.S.
- Burial place: Mountain View Cemetery; Oakland, California
- Military career
- Allegiance: United States
- Branch: United States Army; Union Army
- Service years: 1862–1865
- Rank: Colonel; Bvt. Brigadier General
- Commands: 12th Kansas Infantry Regiment
- Conflicts: American Civil War; Battle of Jenkins Ferry (WIA)

Charles W. Adams (1834–1909) was an officer in the Union Army during the American Civil War. He entered the Union Army in 1862 as a Colonel and was given command of the 12th Kansas Volunteer Infantry. He led his unit at the Battle of Jenkins' Ferry where he received a gunshot wound in his arm. He mustered out of Union service in 1865 as a Brevet Brigadier General and returned to Lawrence, Kansas.

He died in Oakland, California on March 8, 1909.

== See also ==
- List of American Civil War brevet generals (Union)
