= 12th Kansas Infantry Regiment =

- Active: September 1862 – June 3, 1865
- Country: United States
- Allegiance: Union
- Branch: Infantry
- Engagements: Camden Expedition; Battle of Jenkins' Ferry

The 12th Kansas Infantry Regiment was an infantry regiment that served in the Union Army during the American Civil War.

== Service ==
The 12th Kansas Infantry was organized at Paola, Kansas, in September 1862. It mustered in for three years under the command of Colonel Charles W. Adams.

The regiment was attached to Department of Kansas to June 1863. Unattached, District of the Border, Department of Missouri, to January 1864. Unattached, District of the Border, VII Corps, Department of Arkansas, to March 1864. 2nd Brigade, Frontier Division, VII Corps, to May 1864. 1st Brigade, District of the Frontier, VII Corps, to February 1865. 1st Brigade, 3rd Division, VII Corps, February 1865. 1st Brigade, 1st Division, VII Corps, to June 1865.

The 12th Kansas Infantry mustered out at Little Rock, Arkansas, on June 3, 1865.

== Detailed service ==
The regiment was assigned to duty by detachments on line between Kansas and Missouri until November 1863. At Olathe, Paola, Wyandotte, Mound City, Shawnee Trading Post, Fort Scott, Leavenworth, and Fort Riley, Kansas. Company H was at Fort Larned until January 1864, then rejoined regiment at Fort Smith, Arkansas, also occupy Kansas City, Westport, and Hickman Mills, Kansas City, guarding trains and operating against guerrillas. Operations in Jackson County against Quantrill November 2–5, 1862 (Company A). Baxter Springs October 6, 1863 (detachment). Companies B, E, and F escort train to Fort Smith, Arkansas, October 28-November 17, 1863. Companies A, C, D, G, I, and K concentrated at Fort Scott November 1863, and march to Fort Smith, Arkansas, December 13–28, 1863. Duty there until March 1864. Steele's Expedition to Camden March 23-May 3, 1864. Prairie D'Ann April 9–13. Jenkins' Ferry, Saline River, April 29–30. Return to Fort Smith May 3–16, and duty there until February 1865. Fort Smith September 1864. Moved to Little Rock February 24, 1865, and duty there until June.

== Casualties ==
The regiment lost a total of 135 men during service; 2 officers and 10 enlisted men killed or mortally wounded, 2 officers and 121 enlisted men died of disease.

== Commanders ==
- Colonel Charles W. Adams

== Notable members ==
- 1st Lieutenant George Ellis, Company I - Namesake of Ellis County, Kansas, killed at Jenkins Ferry, Arkansas on April 30, 1864.

== See also ==
- List of Kansas Civil War Units
- Kansas in the Civil War
