= 36th Iowa Infantry Regiment =

- Iowa state flag
- Active: 4 October 1862 to 24 August 1865
- Country: United States
- Allegiance: Union
- Branch: Infantry
- Engagements: Battle of Marks' Mills

The 36th Iowa Infantry Regiment was an infantry regiment that served in the Union Army during the American Civil War.

== Service ==
=== Early days of the regiment ===
The Thirty-sixth Iowa Infantry Regiment, US Volunteers, was one of several Midwestern volunteer regiments raised in Iowa, Illinois and Wisconsin in the late winter, spring and summer of 1862. Companies A and K consisted of men from Monroe County, while Companies B, C, D, E, F G, H and I were made up of men from Appanoose and Wapello Counties. A handful of additional men were mustered for the regiment from Wayne, Marion, Lucas, Davis, Lee and Van Buren Counties. The first recruits were mustered into state service as early as February 1862. The ranks were filled out with additional recruits following Lincoln's July 1862 call for 300,000 state volunteers and, by early September, the regiment was officially designated the Thirty-sixth Iowa Infantry Regiment. Colonel Charles W. Kittredge of Ottumwa Iowa was placed in command. Colonel Kittredge had previously served as a captain with the 7th Iowa Infantry Regiment in Missouri during the first year of the war and was an experienced combat veteran.

All companies rendezvoused at Camp Lincoln, Keokuk, Iowa where, on 4 October 1862, they were sworn into United States service for a term of three years. The men were first issued old Austrian and Belgian smoothbore muskets with "sword" bayonets, but these antiques were eventually replaced with more effective .58 caliber Springfield rifled muskets. Following four weeks of basic training at Camp Lincoln, the regiment departed Keokuk on 1 November 1862 aboard two steamboats for St. Louis to await corps and division assignment and to continue training.

=== St. Louis, Memphis and Helena ===
At St. Louis, the regiment went into garrison at Benton Barracks. The Thirty-sixth was attached to the XIII Corps, Army of the Tennessee, and commenced drill by brigade and division. On 20 December 1862 they embarked by steamer for the federal garrison at Helena, Arkansas. The vessel halted at Memphis, Tennessee when the local citizens hailed it from shore with an alarming report that Confederate General Nathan Bedford Forrest and his cavalry were in the neighborhood and were preparing an attack on the city. That night the men of the 36th slept with their arms stacked nearby in Jackson Square. The regiment eventually moved to some old vacated mule-sheds and remained in Memphis performing guard duty at Fort Pickering until 1 January 1863, when it resumed its movement to Helena.

At Helena, the regiment became part of the 1st Brigade, 13th Division, XIII Corps under General Benjamin Prentiss. The regiment was initially quartered in tents but later moved into winter quarters at Fort Curtis in semi-permanent "half-cabins" consisting of log walls with canvas ceilings and dirt floors. These billets had formerly been occupied by the 47th Indiana Infantry Regiment. According to Captain Seth Swiggett of Company B, the ex-Postmaster at Blakesburg, Iowa, the Iowans devised an efficient central heating system in these cabins by burying a length of stovepipe beneath the dirt floor and running it the length of the cabin from a small tin stove on one end to an exhaust pipe on the opposite end. With 5 to 8 men occupying each cabin, the regiment passed the month of January 1863 in as comfortable a manner as could be expected under the circumstances.

=== The Yazoo Pass Expedition and the First Military Action at Shellmound, Mississippi ===
In February 1863, the Thirty-sixth Iowa, 600 strong and part of 13th Division of the XIII Corps commanded by General Leonard Ross, embarked on troop transports for Mississippi to take part in the Yazoo Pass, or Fort Pemberton Expedition. This operation was conceived by General Grant and entailed blowing an opening through the east bank of the Mississippi River near Moon Lake below Helena to open a channel connecting with an inland water route that would enable Grant to encircle the Confederate stronghold at Vicksburg, Mississippi from the north. Veterans of the regiment recalled that during reconnaissance patrols the men had to wade through swamps waist deep. The regiment saw its first action at Shellmound, Mississippi where, after witnessing a fierce artillery duel between federal gunboats and rebel batteries, Captain Swiggett noted that the 36th Iowa had a "sharp exchange" with the rebels The regiment was holding a picket line some 2 miles above the enemy fort and was under frequent artillery fire for several days. No men were killed by enemy action due to the cover afforded by woods on the west bank of the Tallahatchie River. The regiment was engaged on this march for 43 days. They found no unguarded route to Vicksburg and the expedition was abandoned. The men suffered greatly because of almost continuous exposure to the elements on this campaign, including freezing rain and high winds that blew their tents down. In addition to colds, flu fevers and rheumatism, many men were struck down by typhoid and malaria.

=== The Battle of Helena ===
Returning to Helena, the Thirty-sixth commenced a physically demanding daily regimen of drill and building fortifications in anticipation of a Confederate attack expected with the arrival of spring weather. The Thirty-sixth was assigned to build breast works and trenches in support of Battery A at Fort Curtis, on the northernmost end of the Union defenses. The federal line ran in a semicircle around the town with the Mississippi River being their east flank.

On 4 July 1863, a Confederate force under General Holmes estimated at between 8,000 and 10,000 attacked Helena. With devastating artillery fire and additional fire support from the U.S. Navy gunboat Tyler anchored in the river offshore, the Union positions repulsed the assault in a savage, bloody slugfest lasting from dawn until 2 p.m. under a burning hot sun. The Confederates nearly captured some of the federal redoubts where the fighting devolved into hand-to-hand combat. Confederate losses were estimated at 2,000–3,000 and more than 700 of these were taken prisoner. The federals remained on the field in their assigned positions for two more days until it was clear that Holmes' rebels were in full retreat to Little Rock. Much of that time was allowed to burying hundreds of Confederate dead in mass graves where they had fallen.

Vicksburg also surrendered to Grant on 4 July while elsewhere General George Meade repulsed Lee at Gettysburg. The two victories at Helena and Vicksburg on 4 July, and the surrender of the rebel strong-post of Port Hudson on 9 July, ended further serious Confederate threats to federal operations along the Mississippi River and severed communication between rebel forces on opposite sides of the Mississippi for the remainder of the war. With New Orleans, Port Hudson, Vicksburg, Helena, Memphis and Columbus Kentucky in federal hands, the Confederacy west of the river was isolated from secessionist allies in the east. However, rebel guerrilla bands continued to harass federal river traffic from both banks of the Mississippi until the end of the war.

=== DeValls Bluff, Pine Bluff and the capture of Little Rock ===
Following the battle at Helena, the Thirty-sixth was attached to the Third Division, 1st Brigade, Expeditionary Army of Arkansas commanded by Major General Frederick Steele. Marching from Helena on 12 August, the Third Division reached Clarendon, on the White River. Steele complained to his superior, General Stephen Hurlbut at Memphis that he was burdened on his march by at least 10000 men on the sick list. It got even worse at Clarendon, a malaria-breeding village. A number of men of the 36th were left there awaiting river transportation north to DeValls Bluff, where Steele was establishing his main supply base. Those fit to march left Clarendon and proceeded north to DeValls Bluffs. At this point, Brigadier General John Davidson arrived with the 1st (Cavalry) Division and rendezvoused with Steele. Davidson's division did most of the heavy fighting with the troops of Confederate generals Marsh Walker, John Marmaduke and Sterling Price over the next twenty days. As Davidson moved forward and captured Brownsville, the Third and Second Divisions followed . When Davidson's force was blocked at Reed's Bridge, on Bayou Metoe, the 36th and other regiments of the Third Division made a demonstration on the confederate left flank as a diversion. Steele and Davidson then decided on a surprise flank attack from the south bank of the Arkansas River, which was executed on the morning of 10 September. Although not unanticipated, Marmaduke and Price were surprised by the speed with which Davidson made the crossing at Ashley Ford. Driving westward straight toward Little Rock, the infantry of the Third Division followed a parallel course supporting artillery batteries firing on the rebels from the north shore. By 7:30 pm Price and Marmaduke had abandoned the capital and civil authorities surrendered Little Rock to Davidson. Steele arrived a day later. The 36th Iowa did not cross the Arkansas and enter the city until 15 September due to the fact that in their retreat, the Confederates had burned the boat-bridge spanning the two shores, and then a Union pontoon bridge broke down. Upon entering Little Rock, the Third Division and 36th encamped on the spacious high ground south of town near the re-captured U.S. Arsenal and there constructed a permanent camp for winter quarters and endured a bitterly cold winter. Meanwhile, Price and Marmaduke escaped toward Camden, Washington and Murfreesboro to winter while Arkansas state officials moved their capital to the county courthouse at Washington, Arkansas near the Texas-Louisiana border.

=== The Dodd Affair ===
On 8 January 1964, an 80-man detachment from the 36th Iowa and similar detachments from all of the Union regiments encamped near the arsenal formed on the parade ground to witness the execution of 17-year-old David Dodd, a Confederate spy. Dodd had attended nearby St. John College—a private secondary academy—but dropped out after a few months and relocated with his parents to Texas when the Union Army occupied Little Rock. He became a telegraph clerk and learned Morse Code and next joined his father who was a civilian sutler for a Confederate regiment stationed in Mississippi. Returning to Camden Arkansas, Dodd intended to return to Little Rock, ostensibly to visit former classmates and an older sister still enrolled there. He obtained a pass to depart Confederate lines from General James Fagan, who allegedly told young Dodd, "I expect a full report upon your return." Approaching Union lines he obtained a legitimate US Army pass and continued into the city where he spent three days. As Dodd departed Little Rock on the afternoon of the third day, he headed down the Benton road southwest of the city and passed through a federal picket line, where he surrendered his pass, believing he had exited federal lines. Two miles further, however, Dodd encountered a second Union picket line and, having no pass, was arrested by federal troopers of the 8th Missouri Cavalry. Taken before an officer, Dodd was interrogated and could not provide a satisfactory explanation for wandering through the neighborhood at that hour. A notebook taken from him contained notes in Morse Code that, when translated by the assistant army telegrapher, described accurately much of the federal Order of Battle in Little Rock and the disposition of infantry regiments and artillery batteries. With this incriminating evidence in hand, Dodd was taken before a senior officer of the 8th Missouri and further interrogated. It was at this point the prisoner was body-searched, and additional papers and a loaded Derringer pistol were found in his coat. A full investigation revealed that Dodd was almost certainly assisted by a local female accomplice, who was also brought before military authorities and interrogated. Dodd was sentenced to death by a specially appointed Military Commission on a 4 to 2 vote on 5 January 1864. An execution date was set for 8 January. Steele did not bring charges against the female—a close friend of Dodd's and a vocal secessionist whose father quartered Union officers in his home. Instead of charging the daughter and son, Steele had them removed from the Department of Arkansas and deported to Vermont, their native state. There they were essentially placed on house arrest for the duration of the war.

Dodd's case drew the attention of thousands of Arkansans who sought clemency. Steele offered clemency to Dodd if the youngster would reveal who his accomplices were, which offer Dodd refused. The morning of Dodd's execution he was placed on the end-gate of an army ambulance wagon that had been driven beneath a scaffold. Bound hand and foot, Dodd was made to step out onto the wagon tailgate which was propped up by a stout wooden post. The noose was placed around his neck and the post was knocked out from beneath the tail-gate causing the teenager to fall straight down. Unfortunately, the rope stretched, and the fall did not break Dodd's neck; he struggled for several minutes as he slowly strangled to death. After nearly 10 minutes a Union surgeon pronounced him dead. Some federal soldiers who witnessed the execution described it as a "sickening" and "ghastly" affair. but evidence from diaries and letters indicates most felt no remorse or were disturbed by Dodd's execution.

=== The Camden Expedition of the Red River Campaign ===
On 6 January 1864, the Army activated the VII Army Corps to reorganize the former "Expeditionary Army of Arkansas" that had captured Little Rock. Additional regiments were brought to Little Rock from other theaters through the months of January, February and March. The formal announcement of the establishment of the VII Army Corps was made to the troops in February. Steele was resistant to the notion of invading southern Arkansas, primarily due to the already existing shortage of rations at Little Rock, and the fact that any expedition south of the Arkansas river would further distance the army from its already precarious supply lines. Finally Steele received a direct order from Grant (his West Point classmate) to move south and proceed toward Shreveport, Louisiana to link up with Union forces under command of General Nathaniel Banks, who by then had already commenced a campaign up the Red River, converging upon Shreveport. The plan called for Steele's Corps to link up with Banks there and together the combined Union force would push into East Texas to "Plant the US flag." It was hoped that Steele's southward thrust from Little Rock would catch Confederate Commander E. Kirby Smith—Commanding the Confederate Army of the Trans-Mississippi—in a pincer movement, force Smith to fight a two-front action and thus divert precious Confederate resources from the main line of battle on the Red River. It proved to be one of the most ill-advised Union operations of the entire war.

Against his better judgment, the skeptical Steele departed Little Rock on 23 March with some 12,000 troops, including the 36th Iowa Infantry Regiment, restricted to half-ratrions. He knew that the country through which he would march was barren and that foraging alone would not supply sufficient grass for horses and mules or food for the troops, and that federal supply trains from Little Rock and Pine Bluff would be essential to his effort. The column immediately encountered rebel skirmishers along the line of march that followed the Old Military Road from Little Rock southwestward to Washington Arkansas near the Texas border. Steele would skirmish and fight major actions against the Rebel Army of Arkansas under Major-General Sterling Price on each of the next 30 days. The first major engagement took place as Steele's column reached Elkin's Ford on the Little Missouri River on 3 April. Some 2,500 rebels lay in ambush at the ford and viciously attacked as the federals made their crossing. A sharp infantry and artillery exchange ensued in which the 1st Battalion of the Thirty-sixth Iowa played a key role. Under the command of Lieutenant-Colonel Francis Drake, the small Federal detachment of about 500 men from Companies A, D & G, 36th Iowa, three companies of the 43rd Indiana, two picket companies of dismounted troopers of the 1st Iowa Cavalry, and a two-gun artillery section from Battery E, 2nd Missouri Light Artillery skirmished all day as the Confederates bought time to bring up 2,500 reinforcements under command of Major-General John S. Marmaduke after nightfall. Fighting renewed at 6 a.m. the following mornings and lasted 7 hours as Drake and his small command gave ground stubbornly as the larger rebel force tried to drive them back into the Little Missouri River. Meanwhile, Colonel Charles Kittredge moved up the remaining 7 companied of the 36th Iowa to Drake's support. Ordering them to lie down behind a slight ridge on the edge of a cleared field, they lay in wait for the right moment. Marmaduke's artillery concentrated own both Union flanks and on the Federal gun section at last compelled the three companies of the 43rd Indiana holding the Union left flank to give way. Retreating toward the field in disarray, Colonel Kittredge ordered his 7 companies to stand up and fire. They delivered such a devastating volley of musket fire at point blank range that Marmadukes' rebels were completely routed and forced to retire south toward Prairie D'Ane with significant casualties.

Steele's column was at this time reinforced by Brigadier General John Thayer's Frontier Division which had marched from Fort Smith. The combined column continued onward, harassed at every opportunity by rebel skirmishers and snipers as it proceeded slowly on dusty roads through thick forests to the southwest. These attacks slowed Steele's progress and the Corps managed to move only 82 miles in 10 days. Facing the unexpected resistance, and growing dangerously short on supplies, Steele placed all troops on quarter-rations.

The Confederates finally attacked in force as the federals emerged into open country on the Prairie D'Ane near present-day Prescott, Arkansas. The rebels had built fortifications in depth on the prairie. Much of the fighting at Prairie D'Ane was an artillery duel, while the 36th Iowa was brought forward to help make a flanking demonstration on the rebel right flank that convinced Marmaduke to retire from the prairie. Sweeping the rebels aside, Steele now learned from prisoners and spies that Bank's Red River expedition had been soundly beaten at Grande Ecore, and that Banks was in full retreat. With his men on 1/4 rations and now deep in enemy country, Steele changed course and made for Camden, hoping that the Navy could re-supply him there using the navigable Ouchita River.

The defeat of Banks on the Red River enabled Kirby Smith to immediately move General Dick Taylor's Texas division north into southern Arkansas—bringing additional infantry regiments with him from Louisiana and raising some newly recruited units along the way. Taylor opposed this movement, preferring to continue to chase Banks's army on its retreat to Alexandria and hopefully destroy him there. Realizing his imperiled situation, Steele prepared to abandon Camden and march back to Little Rock.

=== Massacre at Poison Spring ===
Steele moved into Camden on 15 April with almost no resistance and discovered that the rebels had destroyed all the steam gristmills near the city except Britton's Mill some 6 miles south of town. The 36th Iowa was ordered to seize the mill and they spent the next few days getting it back in operation and grinding what supply of corn could found by Union foraging parties into meal for the army.

Steele meanwhile sent scouts foraging for other sources of grain and food, and word soon reached his headquarters that a large cache of corn had been discovered some 18 miles northwest of Camden on the upper Washington Road near Poison Springs. On 17 April, Steele ordered Colonel James Williams of Thayer's Frontier Division to assemble a foraging patrol consisting of the 1st Kansas Colored Infantry, elements of three Kansas cavalry regiments, a battery of light artillery and 198 wagons to collect the grain. The next day as the loaded federal wagons were getting underway for the return to Camden, the escort was met by the 18th Iowa Infantry which had marched out to reinforce the party at first light. Near the road junction a few miles from Poison Spring, the advance of Williams' column was ambushed. Outnumbered nearly 8 to 1 by the forces of Generals John Marmaduke and Samuel Maxey, the federals were hit first by Maxey's troops lying in ambush in heavy thicket on their right flank. As they changed front to meet that attack, the larger force to their front assaulted and nearly encircled the federals. Cut off from their route of escape, they were driven steadily to the rear and took refuge behind sheds of a nearby plantation where efforts were made to rally the men to make a stand. The relentless rebel attack pushed them to the rear of the train which they were forced to abandon and some 900 yards further, all the way to a timber line and into a swamp. Those in the rear of the retreating federal column were scattered and in disarray and soon encircled and were shot down or were compelled to surrender. The federals suffered more than 300 casualties, including 204 wounded. True to the threats of Jefferson Davis and the Confederate Government, Negro troops received no quarter in this battle. Most of the enlisted men of the 1st Kansas Colored Infantry were killed, wounded or were summarily executed after they surrendered. Such was the savagery found in the western theater of operations during the Civil War.

The disaster at Poison Spring resulted in the loss of 198 supply wagons, a four-gun battery—which however were spiked by the federal gunners—and the horses and mules to pull them, exacerbating further Steele's supply problem. The men of the Thirty-sixth Iowa clearly heard the sounds of the Poison Springs battle to their northwest and then discovered that Fagan had moved his mounted brigade up to within two miles of Brittons' Mills. Realizing that the rebels could attack them at first light with overwhelming numbers, and having no artillery and just a small cavalry detachment with them, the regiment loaded their wagons and made a forced march back into Camden after dark. .

=== Disaster at Mark's Mills ===
A 240-wagon supply train arrived at Camden from the federal base at Pine Bluff on 20 April, but it only carried half-rations for ten days. With supplies short, Steele ordered Lt. Colonel Francis Drake, Thirty-sixth Iowa, to take temporary command of the 2nd Brigade to escort these wagons back to Pine Bluff. At Pine Bluff, Drake was to refill the wagons and escort the train back to Camden. Colonel William McLean, the brigade commander was reported to be "indisposed," while Colonel Charles Kittredge, next in line for command of the 2nd Brigade, was reported sick in quarters; Kittredge thus sent his number two, LTC Drake in his place to command the train and the 2nd Brigade. Major Augustus H. Hamilton assumed direct command of the 36th Iowa on this operation. The remainder of the brigade included elements of the 1st Indiana Cavalry and 5th Missouri Cavalry, the 43rd Indiana Infantry, 77th Ohio Infantry, and four artillery pieces in two section of Battery E, 2nd Missouri Light Artillery—about 1,200 troops in all. Additionally, the 1st Iowa Cavalry Regiment, which had served its 3 years and was on its way home on furlough and for re-enlistment, was scheduled to follow and catch up with Drake's train on the 1st or 2nd day. The brigade also included a section of 75 civilian Negro pioneer laborers whose job it was to move ahead of the train, felling trees and laying them down to build corduroy roads over the muddy, difficult route. The train with escort left Camden on Friday, 22 April and Drake soon found that an additional entourage of some 50–75 civilian wagons carrying teamsters, sutlers, cotton speculators, about 300 Negro refugees and other assorted camp followers had joined the expedition. Due to very muddy road conditions, progress was slow and the column was harassed by cavalry scouts belonging to Rebel General Jo Shelby's "Iron Brigade" on the first day out from Camden. Shelby had no interest in bringing on a general engagement but was ranging widely east of the Ouachita River to keep an eye on Union forces operating there. The scouts who skirmished with Drake on the first day immediately informed Shelby of the large supply train, and when Shelby linked up with a large Confederate Task Force commanded by Major-General James Fagan the following day, Fagan decided to make a forced march with 7 brigades 50 miles east to establish and ambush position. By mid-afternoon of the second days of march—a Sunday—Drake had reached the western approach to the Moro River—essentially a large creek that habitually went out of its banks in a wide swath due to spring rains. Lieutenant Samuel Swiggett, B/36th, recounted in his memoirs that, while no surface water could be discerned in the Moro Bottom, the ground was so saturated by the recent rains that anyone or anything attempting to cross it would become hopelessly buried deep in mud and muck.

Steele had cautioned Drake not to attempt to cross the Moro Bottom after dark, and additionally, the civilian teamsters were starting to get out of hand, complaining to Drake about the rigors of the pace, according to Swiggett. Rather than proceed, therefore, Drake halted the column on the west bank of the Moro Bottom on Sunday afternoon. In his official after-action report, Drake stated that he stopped the column that Sunday "evening". The timing is very much in dispute, for Captain Swiggett later noted in his memoirs that the column halted long before nightfall and in fact had gone into camp on the west bank at 2 pm Sunday. Captain Swiggett opined that, had Drake exhibited more backbone by insisting on moving across Moro Bottom Sunday afternoon, the entire train could have crossed safely before nightfall, would have been well on its way to Pine Bluff, and would have avoided the tragedy to come. Although Drake could perhaps claim later that he was technically following Steele's orders by going into bivouac when he did, Swiggett noted that there was a strong sense of gloom and foreboding in the federal camp as they lay there immobile on Sunday afternoon. As it was, Drake posted cavalry squads of 25 troopers each 2 miles to his front and 5 miles to his rear on Sunday, with orders for them to scout all roads for 5 miles in all directions at daybreak on Monday.

Sunday night passed without incident and, having received no reports of the enemy from his scouts on Monday morning, Drake ordered the march resumed. The 43rd Indiana Infantry Regiment was deployed to lead the way, while the 36th Iowa marched on the flank of the wagons. Drake ordered the 77th Ohio to form the rear-guard and that regiment lagged almost 3 miles to the rear. As the column crossed the Moro Bottom with difficulty and headed to higher ground, federal scouts informed Major Wesley Norris commanding the 43rd Indiana that they had discovered signs of large, hastily abandoned cavalry encampments to their immediate front. Norris sent a report back to Drake, who dismissed it rather curtly and sent forward orders for the 43rd to pick up the pace. A short distance further, in a clearing at a fork in the road occupied by a few log cabins, the 43rd Indiana was fired on by dismounted rebel cavalry from General Fagan's command. Fagan had evaded Union scouts the previous night by crossing the Ouachita River below Camden and making a forced march (52 miles) to get into position ahead of Drake's train between the Moro and Pine Bluff. That morning they were lying in ambush near the crossroad clearing, known as Mark's Mills, just east of present-day Fordyce in Cleveland County.

Forming line of battle, the 43rd Indiana's Norris ordered his command to charge Fagan's dismounted cavalry. As the charge commenced, Confederate General William Cabell's mounted cavalry revealed itself from concealed positions in the trees on the south, or right flank. What began as a skirmish at around 8:30 am quickly developed into a very hot firefight with the Federals firing in two directions to beat off the assault. The well-aimed fire from the veteran Federal infantry was devastatingly effective and slowed Fagan's advance. Drake ordered the train to pull off the road into an empty field and then ordered Major Hamilton to deploy the first battalion of the 36th Iowa Infantry up and onto the firing line on the 43rd Indiana's left flank. Just as this battalion came on line, the Confederates charged the center and took another devastating musket volley from the Federals. Drake then ordered up Peetz's 2nd Missouri Battery at the double-quick. As Peetz's gun crews swung their guns into position, the Federal infantry was ordered to move to both flanks to open a hole in the center. This was done with alacrity and Peetz's gun crews opened fire on the rebels with grapeshot at less than 200 yards. This stunned the Confederates, resulting in a momentary lull in the battle, but musket fire quickly resumed. As the Iowa and Indiana infantrymen were concentrating on the rebels to their front and right flank. General Jo Shelby's two cavalry brigade swooped down on them from the left flank, where Shelby had waited in reserve for more than an hour. Three companies of the 36th Iowa, the entire 43rd Indiana and Captain Peetz's battery of the Second Missouri Light Artillery were now pressed on three sides and were in danger of being encircled. Drake ordered the remainder of the 36th Iowa Infantry—five companies commanded by Captain Joseph Bull Gedney—into position at the extreme left flank. Drake sent an order to Gedney to support a cavalry charge into Cabell's troops to push them back, prevent encirclement and attempt a link-up with the 77th Ohio, which was now moving forward to join the battle but still a mile to the rear. Before this message could be delivered however, Drake was wounded and fell from his horse from blood loss. The rebels proceeded to close the trap when Shelby made his charge on Gedney's battalion. The Federal troops were surrounded, it quickly became a confused entanglement of small units fighting small units and then it became, according to Captain Seth Swiggett, "Every man for himself."

Shelby's and Cabell's troopers rushed down on the now disorganized Federals, capturing them in groups of two or three until there was no further resistance. Veteran survivors reported that the battle lasted fully five hours. Some men of the 36th Iowa's first battalion took cover in the log cabins and kept up a withering and deadly fire, holding out from those protected positions until long after the others had surrendered, and until they exhausted their ammunition. When the insurgents threatened to burn the cabins down, the Iowans surrendered. In his after-action report, Cabell stated that 17 prisoners were taken from the larger of the two cabins. According to Captain Swiggett, when capture became certain, most of the Iowa men smashed their rifles against trees rather than hand them over to their captors.

As the men of the 36th and 43rd Indiana were being rounded up and disarmed, a last-ditch effort to break into the Confederate ring by some brave federal cavalrymen created enough confusion and a diversion for some of the Iowa soldiers to bolt and escape. Several disappeared into the nearby woods and a few headed to the rear to warn the 77th Ohio of the overwhelming size of the enemy force to their front. Reaching a mounted captain of the 77th, the 36th Iowa men were accused of being deserters and their alarm was not heeded. The 77th's commanding officer ordered his regiment forward at the double quick into the melee and soon that regiment was also overwhelmed by the three rebel cavalry divisions and compelled to surrender. The best casualty figures indicate that the 36th Iowa lost 42 killed outright and 89 wounded, of whom about 40 later died of their wounds. The remainder became prisoners and were force-marched to the notorious rebel prison stockade at Tyler, Texas.

Some of the men who escaped evaded re-capture by moving across country, carefully avoiding rebel patrols. Half starved, exhausted and unarmed, some reached the safety of Union lines at Pine Bluff, while others managed to reach Little Rock. There they reported the news of what had befallen their comrades at Mark's Mills. Colonel Powell Clayton, the federal commander at Pine Bluff, reported to General Sherman a few days after the battle that 186 Union cavalry and about 90 federal infantrymen had managed to escape and report in at Pine Bluff and at Little Rock. The 36th Iowa Infantry had ceased to exist by 3 pm on 25 April 1864.

=== The Battle of Jenkins' Ferry ===
Learning of the disaster at Mark's Mills, Steele immediately put the VII Corps in motion from Camden on the morning of 26 April with the object of crossing the Saline River at Jenkins' Ferry and retiring to Little Rock. The corps made a forced march northeastward to the Saline, where high water necessitated the installation of a rubber pontoon bridge. Steele then moved his army across the swollen river, one wagon at a time, one gun limber at a time, and had three-quarters of his trains and artillery on the opposite bank when his rear-guard regiments were strongly attacked by the pursuing Confederates. In a savage battle that ranged through plowed fields on the south bank of the Saline, Steele's troops poured volley after volley into the pursuing insurgents, first stalling their attack, and then turning it and buying time for the lead elements of the column to cross the pontoon bridge. Union infantry then made their crossing and took up guard from the opposite bank. Steele ordered the pontoon bridge to remain in place two more hours to enable wounded men and stragglers to be rescued. Then the bridge was destroyed in place, and allowed to sink into the river. While Steele's Corps got bogged down on muddy roads north of the Saline, it managed to make a safe withdrawal to Little Rock.

While the majority of 36th Iowa Infantry troops were captured at the Battle of Mark's Mills, some men of the 2nd Brigade—including Thirty-sixth Iowa men who had been left behind sick in quarters at Camden—were not present with the regiment at Mark's Mills. When Steele abandoned Camden therefore, these 36th Iowa remnants were assigned to a Casual Detachment under the command of Captain Marmaduke Darnall of the Forty-third Indiana, and these men fought bravely with the Casual Detachment in the Battle of Jenkins' Ferry.

=== Prisoners of war at Camp Ford ===
Some 240 men of the 36 Iowa Infantry Regiment were captured at Mark's Mills. In the aftermath, those too seriously wounded to be moved were left under guard at the home of the Marks Family on whose property the battle had taken place, and in the care of the regiment's medical aides. Lieutenant Colonel Drake, who had been seriously wounded by a bullet to the hip, was held only a week before being paroled and released. Drake returned to Iowa for treatment and convalescence. Meanwhile, several of the regiment's battle dead were interred on the Marks Family property. The wounded and regimental medical aides were left under the supervision of Lieutenant Benjamin Pearson, B/36th. The Confederate soldiers assigned to remain at Marks Mills to guard the wounded federal soldiers had no medical supplies and, after a few days, they asked Lt. Pearson to travel into the Union lines at Pine Bluff and bring back food and medicine for the wounded. Pearson succeeded in this task, but he did not return to Marks Mills, instead sending the supplies back to Marks' Mills by a courier and then re-joining the federals and eventually making his way back to Little Rock. Pearson had not been wounded in the battle, and his selection as officer to remain behind with these seriously wounded soldiers may have been due to the fact that Pearson had served as a second chaplain with the regiment since its days at Helena.

The Confederate victors of Marks Mills robbed the survivors of every valuable item they possessed, including hats, boots, watches, money and in some cases, the clothes on their backs. Overall, they were very roughly handled by their captors, according to Captain Swiggett. They were force-marched to the rebel prison at Camp Ford in Tyler, Texas, where dozens of them perished from disease over the next 12 months. Conditions at Camp Ford were primitive. Although a good spring provided cool clean water, and while the Confederate guards slaughtered cattle to supply the prisoners fresh beef regularly, the prisoners had no shelter from the sun or rain except improvised huts or blankets, and as the numbers of prisoners rose, the sanitary conditions declined precipitously, leading to many deaths from exposure, chronic diarrhea and disease. A number of the 36th Iowa's officers escaped. Captain Swiggett twice escaped but was recaptured on both occasions and was rewarded for his bad behavior by being one of the last prisoners exchanged.

Those who survived the horrors of Camp Ford were paroled on 25 February 1865, and exchanged at New Orleans on 28 February. After several days of recuperation there, the former prisoners were granted 30 days home leave, and started for Iowa. Those who were still deemed fit for duty returned to join the rest of the regiment—five small companies consisting of men not taken prisoner—at DeValls Bluff, Arkansas by 1 April 1865. In the months after Marks Mills and Jenkins Ferry, some 237 officers and men not captured at Marks Mills carried out garrison duty at Little Rock and later St. Charles Arkansas until the Confederacy surrendered. With more than a month left to serve, the reconstituted regiment—fortified with recently recruited volunteers—was sent as garrison troops at DeValls Bluff—the primary Federal supply depot on the upper White River.

The regiment was mustered out of federal service at DeValls Bluff 24 August 1865. The veterans returned north to Davenport, Iowa, where they received their final Army pay and were dismissed from state service.

=== Postscript ===
The Union Army never controlled the territory of Southern Arkansas, but it occupied the capital and effectively took the state out of the war for all practical purposes and contained the threat to Missouri from Sterling Price in October 1864 and for the remainder of the war.

Lieutenant Colonel Francis Drake, was promoted full Colonel on 8 May 1865 and shortly thereafter to Brigadier General. In a strange sequence of events, Colonel Charles W. Kittredge was court-martialed for habitual drunkenness and conduct unbecoming an officer in a 10-day trial at Little Rock in January 1865. Although acquitted by the court—which consisted of several of Kittredge's old friends—the decision was overturned by Major General J.J. Reynolds, who had relieved Steele in command of VII Corps in November 1864. Reynolds sent a recommendation to President Lincoln that Kittredge be cashiered from the service. The War Department notified Kittredge of his dismissal in March. Kittredge, however, fought the decision and after much effort, secured his commission and command of the regiment on 15 August 1865-just ten days before the 36th Iowa was mustered out at DeValls Bluff. But few officers of the regiment paid any attention to the decision or to Kittredge, and they continued to take orders from Drake and Brevet Major William Vermillion. Kittredge seized a technical victory but he never restored his reputation with the officers and men of the 36th Iowa.

The regimental colors of the Thirty-sixth Iowa Infantry are on display in the rotunda of the Iowa State Capital in Des Moines.

=== Officers of the Thirty-sixth Iowa Infantry at Mark's Mills, 25 April 1864 ===
- Lieutenant Colonel Francis M. Drake, Acting Commander, 2nd Brigade *
- Major Augustus.H. Hamilton, Commanding the Thirty-sixth Iowa *
- Major Colin M. Strong, Surgeon *
- Lieutenant Steven K. Mahon, Adjutant *
- Michael Huston Hare, Chaplain *
- Captain John M. Porter – Company A *
- Captain Samuel A. Swiggett – Company B *
- Captain Allen H. Miller – Company C *
- Captain Thomas B. Hale – Company D *
- First Sergeant Henry Slagle – Company E *
- Captain William F. Vermillion – Company F
- Captain Thomas M. Fee – Company G *
- Lieutenant James W. Thompson – Company H *
- Captain Joseph B. Gedney – Company I *
- Captain John Lambert – Company K *
- Denotes staff and line officers captured at Mark's Mills 25 April 1864

=== Summary of service ===
Organized at Keokuk and mustered in on 4 October 1862. Ordered to Memphis, Tennessee, December 1862; thence to Helena, Arkansas. Attached to 1st Brigade, 13th Division, 13th Army Corps, Dept. of Tennessee, to February 1863. 2nd Brigade, 13th Division, 13th Army Corps, to July 1863, 2nd Brigade, 13th Division, 16th Army Corps, to August 1863. 1st Brigade, 13th Division, 16th Army Corps, to August 1863. 1st Brigade, 3rd Division, Arkansas Expedition, to December 1863. 1st Brigade, 3rd Division, 7th Army Corps, Dept. of Arkansas, to March 1864. 2nd Brigade, 3rd Division, 7th Army Corps, to May 1864. 2nd Brigade, 1st Division, 7th Army Corps, to February 1865. 1st Brigade, 1st Division, 7th Army Corps, to March 1865. 1st Brigade, 2nd Division, 7th Army Corps, to August 1865.

Duty at Helena, Arkansas, until 24 February 1863. Yazoo Pass Expedition by Moon Lake, Yazoo Pass and Coldwater and Tallahatchie Rivers, and operations against Fort Pemberton and Greenwood 24 February – 5 April. Fort Pemberton 4 April. Post duty at Helena until 10 August. Repulse of Holmes' attack on Helena 4 July. (A detachment on expedition to Napoleonville 23–26 May, and engaged near Island No. 65, 25 May.) Steele's Expedition to Little Rock 10 August – 10 September. Bayou Fourche and capture of Little Rock 10 September. Duty at Little Rock until 26 October. Pursuit of Marmaduke's forces 26 October – 1 November. Duty at Pine Bluff and Little Rock until 23 March 1864. Steele's Expedition to Camden 23 March – 3 May. Elkin's Ford, Little Missouri River, 4–6 April. Prairie D'Ann 10–13 April. Jenkins Ferry and Camden 15 April. Occupation of Camden 15–23 April. Battle of Marks Mill 25 April; most of Regiment captured. Confined at Camp Ford, Tyler, Texas, until March 1865. Rejoined Regiment at St. Charles on White River, Arkansas, April 1865. Action at Jenkins Ferry, Saline River, 30 April 1864. Duty at Little Rock until March 1865; at St. Charles until May, and at Duvall's Bluff until August 1865. Mustered out 24 August 1865.

Regiment lost during service 1 officer and 64 enlisted men killed and mortally wounded and 6 officers and 232 enlisted men by disease. Total 303.

== Total strength and casualties ==
A total of 1335 men served in the 36th Iowa at one time or another during its existence. It suffered 1 officer and 64 enlisted men killed in action or who died of wounds and 6 officers and 232 enlisted men died of disease, for a total of 303 fatalities.

== Commanders ==
- Colonel Charles W. Kittredge
- Lieutenant Colonel Francis M. Drake
- Captain, (later Brevet Major) William F. Vermillion

== See also ==
- List of Iowa Civil War Units
- Iowa in the American Civil War
