= 77th Ohio Infantry Regiment =

American Civil War Union Army infantry regiment

- Active: September 28, 1861, to March 8, 1866
- Country: United States
- Allegiance: Union
- Branch: Infantry
- Engagements: Battle of Shiloh; Siege of Corinth; Camden Expedition; Battle of Fort Blakeley

The 77th Ohio Infantry Regiment, sometimes 77th Ohio Volunteer Infantry (or 77th OVI) was an infantry regiment in the Union Army during the American Civil War.

== Service ==
The 77th Ohio Infantry was organized in Marietta, Ohio, beginning October 28, 1861, and mustered in for three years service under the command of Colonel Jesse Hildebrand.

The regiment was attached to District of Paducah, Kentucky, to March 1862. 3rd Brigade, 5th Division, Army of the Tennessee, to May 1862. 2nd Brigade, 5th Division, Army of the Tennessee, to July 1862. 2nd Brigade, 5th Division, District of Memphis, Tennessee, to August 1862. Alton, Illinois, to August 1863. 1st Brigade, 3rd Division, Arkansas Expedition, to January 1864. 1st Brigade, 3rd Division, VII Corps, Department of Arkansas, to April 1864. 2nd Brigade, 3rd Division, VII Corps, to May 1864. 3rd Brigade, 1st Division, VII Corps, to February 1865. 3rd Brigade, 3rd Division, XIII Corps, Military Division West Mississippi, to June 1865. Department of Texas, to March 1866.

The 77th Ohio Infantry mustered out of service at Brownsville, Texas, on March 8, 1866.

== Detailed service ==
- Left State for Paducah, KY, February 17, 1862.
- Moved from Paducah, KY, to Savannah, TN, March 6–10, 1862.
- Expedition to Yellow Creek, MS, and occupation of Pittsburg Landing, TN, March 14–17, 1862.
- Expedition to Eastport, MS, and Chickasaw, AL, April 1, 1862.
- Battle of Shiloh, April 6–7, 1862.
- Corinth Road (Fallen Timbers), April 8, 1862.
- Advance on and siege of Corinth, Miss., April 29-May 30, 1862.
- March to Memphis, TN, via LaGrange, Grand Junction, and Holly Springs, June 1-July 21. Duty there until August 27, 1862.
- Ordered to Alton, IL, and duty there as guard of military prisons until July 31, 1863.
- Moved to Helena, Arkansas, July 31, then to Duvall's Bluff, August 22, 1863.
- Steele's Expedition to Little Rock, AR, September 1–10, 1863.
- Battle of Bayou Fourche and capture of Little Rock, September 10. Duty at Little Rock until September 23, 1863.
- Regiment reenlisted December 20, 1863, and mustered in as veterans January 22, 1864, and moved to Columbus, Ohio.
- Returned to Little Rock, March 1–17, 1864.
- Camden Expedition, March 23-May 3, 1864.
- Okolona, AR (Battle of Elkin's Ferry), April 2–3, 1864.
- Battle of Prairie D'Ane, April 9–12, 1864.
- Camden, AR, April 15–18, 1864.
- Battle of Marks' Mills, April 25, 1864, most of the regiment captured.
- Evacuation of Camden, April 27, 1864.
- Battle of Jenkins' Ferry, April 30, 1864.
- Duty in the Department of Arkansas until February 1865.
- Regiment exchanged February 1865, and ordered to New Orleans, LA, February 9, 1865.
- Moved to Mobile Point, AL, February 20, 1865.
- Campaign against Mobile and its defenses, March 17-April 12, 1865.
- Siege of Spanish Fort and Fort Blakeley, March 26-April 9, 1865.
- Occupation of Mobile April 12, 1865.
- Advance to Mt. Vernon April 13–22, 1865.
- Moved to Mobile May 12, then to Texas, June 1–9, 1865.
- Duty at Brazos Santiago and Brownsville and in the Department of Texas, until March 1866.

== Casualties ==
The regiment lost a total of 280 men during service; 2 officers and 68 enlisted men killed or mortally wounded, 2 officers and 208 enlisted men died of disease.

== Commanders ==
- Colonel Jesse Hildebrand - brigade commander at the Battle of Shiloh; died April 18, 1863
- Colonel William B. Mason - mustered out December 31, 1864 on expiration of term of service
- Lieutenant Colonel Wills De Hass - commanded at the Battle of Shiloh
- Lieutenant Colonel William E. Stevens - Promoted to colonel on March 7, 1866, but not mustered at that rank; mustered out with regiment on March 8, 1866
- Major Benjamin D. Fearing - commanded at the Battle of Shiloh, discharged on August 26, 1862; later Brevet Brigadier General, U.S.V.

== See also ==
- List of Ohio Civil War units
- Ohio in the Civil War
