= Battle of Poison Spring =

1864 American Civil War battle

- Part of the American Civil War
Date	April 18, 1864
Location	Ouachita County, Arkansas 33°38′20″N 93°00′16″W
Result	Confederate victory

Belligerents
Confederate States; Choctaw Nation	United States (Union)

Commanders and leaders
(Confederate States of America) Samuel B. Maxey (Confederate States of America) John S. Marmaduke	(United States) James M. Williams

Strength
3,621	1,169

Casualties and losses
114	301
- Location in the United States

The Battle of Poison Spring, also known as the Poison Spring massacre, was fought in Ouachita County, Arkansas, on April 18, 1864, as part of the Camden Expedition, during the American Civil War. A Union force commanded by Major General Frederick Steele had moved from Little Rock, Arkansas, in support of Major General Nathaniel Banks's movement along the Red River towards Shreveport, Louisiana. Steele's objective was also Shreveport, and his men occupied Camden, Arkansas. After Banks was defeated at the battles of Mansfield and Pleasant Hill, Steele was isolated in Arkansas. Short on supplies, Steele sent a detachment commanded by Colonel James M. Williams on April 17 to forage for 5,000 bushels of corn (maize) that were reported to be in the area.

Confederate cavalry commanded by John S. Marmaduke and Samuel B. Maxey attacked the foraging party. Marmaduke's men formed a roadblock east along the way back to Camden, while Maxey's men attacked from south of the road. The first two Confederate attacks were unsuccessful, but the third broke the Union line. Williams's command was routed, losing its wagon train and four cannons. African-American soldiers from the 1st Kansas Colored Infantry Regiment were massacred and mutilated during and after the battle. Poison Spring has been referred to as the worst massacre in the history of Arkansas. The defeat at Poison Spring and another defeat at the Battle of Marks' Mills a week later led Steele to retreat to Little Rock. In the April 30 Battle of Jenkins' Ferry, men from the 2nd Kansas Colored Infantry Regiment murdered Confederate soldiers in revenge of the massacre at Poison Spring. Poison Springs Battleground State Park, which is part of the Camden Expedition Sites National Historic Landmark, preserves a portion of the site of the battle.

== Background ==
Significant sites related to the battle of Poison Spring. Poison Spring is marked in green.

By early 1864, it was unlikely that the Confederacy would win the American Civil War against the Union and the Confederate situation in Arkansas was particularly bad. Union forces had captured the state capital of Little Rock, and had at least nominal control over all of the state north of the Arkansas River. The Confederate political and military authorities had fallen back into the southwestern portion of the state. In March, the Union Navy and Union Army began a joint operation along the Red River, known as the Red River campaign. Militarily, the campaign targeted Shreveport, Louisiana, to disperse Confederate forces within that region. The campaign also had political goals (the establishment of a pro-Union government in Louisiana) and economic goals (the capture of Confederate cotton). Major General Nathaniel P. Banks led the army forces, and Rear Admiral David Dixon Porter was in charge of naval operations.

To support this movement, Union troops commanded by Major General Frederick Steele were tasked with moving south from Little Rock to Shreveport, in what became known as the Camden Expedition. Steele objected to his portion of the campaign due to the poor state of the road network of the region his men would have to march through, as well as the lack of food in the region. He was also worried about guerrilla warfare and his supply line. The Camden Expedition involved two Union forces beginning the campaign independently and joining during the march: Steele started from Little Rock, while Brigadier General John M. Thayer left Fort Smith, Arkansas. (Note: The historian Thomas DeBlack lists Steele's strength as 8,500 men and Thayer's as 4,000. The historian Ludwell H. Johnson puts Thayer's strength at 3,600 men and Steele's at 6,800. Another estimate of Union strength comes from the historian Daniel E. Sutherland, who has Steele's strength as 8,500 and Thayer's as 3,600. The historian Michael J. Forsyth states that Thayer and Steele combined for about 12,000 men.) The Confederate troops opposing the Camden Expedition were led by Major General Sterling Price. Price's infantry had been transferred to Louisiana to face Banks's advance, leaving him with only 3,200 cavalrymen.

Steele left Little Rock on March 23, and reached Arkadelphia on March 29. He was supposed to join forces with Thayer there, but Thayer's column was delayed and Steele continued forward on April 1. After learning that Camden was fortified, Steele decided to feint towards Washington (the new Confederate state capital) to draw the Confederates out of Camden, which would allow the latter city to be taken easily. Due to lack of supplies, the Union troops had to subsist on half rations, and drinkable water was scarce in some areas due to guerrillas polluting wells with dead animals. Price's cavalry harassed Steele's advance. The Confederate commander fell for the feint, and moved his troops from Camden to the Prairie D'Ane area. There, he was reinforced by two more cavalry brigades – one of Texas troops and the other of Choctaws. On April 9, Thayer's column joined Steele's; protracted skirmishing between the two sides occurred over the next few days in the Battle of Prairie D'Ane. The combined Union force started towards Camden on April 12, reaching the town three days later.

== Prelude ==
On April 8, Banks was defeated in the Battle of Mansfield. After further fighting at the Battle of Pleasant Hill the next day, Banks decided to break off his offensive and withdraw. At Camden, Steele had significant supply issues with a lack of food for both his men and pack animals. While he did not have official news of Banks's defeat, rumor had reached Camden of the Union defeat, complicating matters for Steele. Union rations had to be reduced to one quarter of the normal amount due to lack of food. Price's cavalry hovered around Camden, unwilling to directly attack due to the disparity in numerical strength but lying in wait of any patrols or foraging parties sent from the Union command. The Confederate force consisted of three understrength cavalry divisions, which were commanded by Brigadier Generals John S. Marmaduke, James F. Fagan, and Samuel B. Maxey. Maxey's division numbered about 1,500 men, and the other two divisions totaled about 3,200. A large amount of corn was stored on farms in the area surrounding Camden. While Confederate soldiers searched for and destroyed some of this corn, some made it into Union hands through foraging and Union-sympathizing civilians. A further 3,000 bushels of corn were captured when Union cavalry took the Confederate steamer Homer. Only one of the steam-powered gristmills in the area remained usable; Steele sent part of the 36th Iowa Infantry Regiment to operate it on April 17.

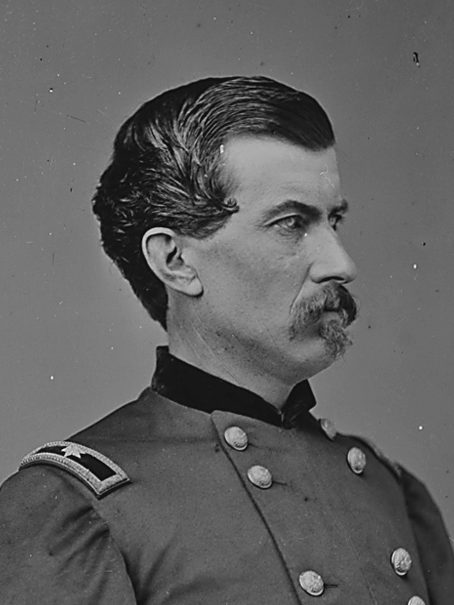
Colonel James M. Williams, the Union commander

On April 16, Steele learned that 5,000 bushels of corn were located about 15 miles (24 km) from Camden, on the road to Washington. Steele tasked his quartermaster, Captain Charles A. Henry, with capturing the cache. Command of the foraging expedition went to Colonel James M. Williams, commander of the 1st Kansas Colored Infantry Regiment. Williams was informed by Thayer that forage was reportedly plentiful in the area around White Oak Creek. The 1st Kansas Colored was a unit of African-American soldiers, most of whom were formerly enslaved in Arkansas and Missouri. Most Confederate soldiers strongly resented the use of African-American troops, viewing it as a form of servile insurrection. Also, most Confederates did not view the African-American troops as parties to the rules of war. Confederate Lieutenant General E. Kirby Smith, the commander of the Trans-Mississippi Department, had earlier stated that his officers should give "no quarter to armed negroes and their officers". The Confederates had a special dislike for Kansas troops in general, as the soldiers from that state had a reputation for excessive pillaging and destruction.

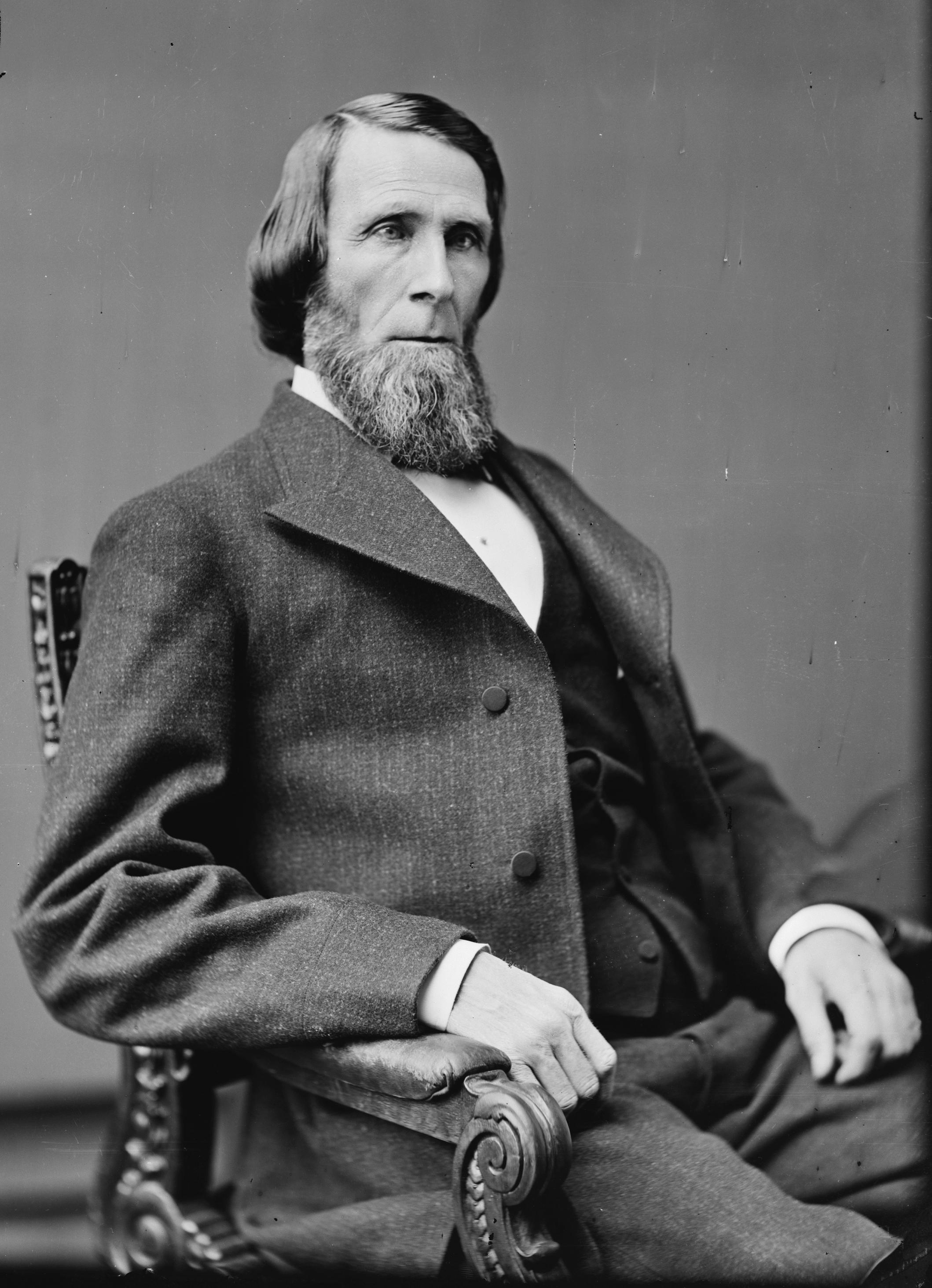
Brigadier General Samuel Bell Maxey, the Confederate commander

Early on the morning of April 17, Williams set out from Camden with 198 wagons. The wagon escort included 438 soldiers from the 1st Kansas Colored, as well as 195 cavalrymen taken from the 2nd Kansas Cavalry Regiment, 6th Kansas Cavalry Regiment, and 14th Kansas Cavalry Regiment, along with two 6-pounder James rifles from the 2nd Independent Battery Indiana Light Artillery. After an 18-mile (29 km) march, the Union troops reached the White Oak Creek area. About half of the corn had already been destroyed by the Confederates when the Union soldiers arrived. The corn was scattered in small amounts at farms in the area, necessitating wide patrols by Williams's command. As well as the corn, clothing and other belongings were looted from civilian residences in the area. On April 18, the Union column began its return to Camden. The captured materials were loaded into 141 wagons. That morning, 4 miles (6.4 km) east of White Oak Creek, Williams's men were joined by a relief column sent by Thayer. This consisted of 386 men from the 18th Iowa Infantry Regiment, 95 cavalrymen from the same units that Williams's cavalry contingent was drawn from, and two 12-pounder mountain howitzers manned by men of the 6th Kansas Cavalry. In total, the Union force now numbered 1,169 men, although many were straggling to engage in looting. Heavy fatigue was another cause of straggling, and Williams estimated that he had at most 1,000 men effective for combat.

Confederate scouts learned of the Union foraging party on the morning of April 17. One of Marmaduke's brigade commanders, Colonel Colton Greene, sent the 3rd Missouri Cavalry Regiment to investigate. Marmaduke requested reinforcements from Fagan, who sent Brigadier General William L. Cabell's brigade. When the relief column left Camden, it was sighted by Confederate scouts, who overestimated its strength. Marmaduke believed he was outnumbered by 2,500 men to 1,500. Learning that the Union column was camping for the night near White Oak Creek, Marmaduke formulated a plan to trap the Union soldiers in the morning. The plan, which was approved by Price, called for the brigades of Greene, Cabell, and Colonel William A. Crawford (another one of Fagan's brigade commanders) to form a roadblock 10 miles (16 km) west of Camden at Poison Spring. Additional Confederate troops were to gather 3 miles (5 km) west at Woodlawn, to trap Williams's command between the two forces. Price ordered Maxey's division to support Marmaduke. Maxey held seniority over Marmaduke and would command the operation. The historian Michael J. Forsyth considers the decision to assign Maxey to the operation to be an example of Price's lack of attention to detail. Marmaduke made most of the decisions during the battle.

== Battle ==
=== Initial maneuvers ===
Williams pushed his men further on the morning of April 18; the 1st Kansas Colored was at the front of the column, with the men from the relief column to the rear. This arrangement kept the two forces distinct. Not long after the junction between the two forces, the Union soldiers encountered Confederate cavalrymen. As the relief column had skirmished with Confederate troops on its way from Camden, this was not immediately alarming. By 9:30 am, Marmaduke had his troops in a blocking position, with Maxey's division preparing to assault the Union right flank. Fagan chose not to accompany the action, and the two brigades from his division operated under the command of Cabell.

Marmaduke's men probed westwards, and occupied a hill. Hughey's Arkansas Battery was deployed on the hill, with Cabell's to the left and Crawford's to the right. Greene's brigade was held as a reserve. Most of Cabell and Crawford's men were dismounted. One regiment of Cabell's, the 2nd Arkansas Cavalry Regiment, was held in a position 2 miles (3.2 km) to the east to watch for Union troops arriving from Camden. Harris's Missouri Battery supported Crawford. The success of the operation depended on Maxey's men arriving on time for their part of the attack; Marmaduke's position was also at risk of further Union troops sallying forth from Camden and striking the roadblock in the rear. This position was 14 miles (23 km) west of Camden. Williams's men encountered the roadblock and reported it to their commander, who ordered the wagons to be positioned in a compact formation north of the road. Dense woods along the edge of the road would make it difficult to outflank the Confederate line; the ground south of the road was a cleared field that sloped uphill to a ridgeline. A ravine cut through the field and would provide cover to Confederate troops attacking from that direction.

For about half an hour after Marmaduke set the roadblock Union troops probed and skirmished with the line. At about 10:00, Maxey's troops arrived. After the troops arrived, Maxey met with Marmaduke and accepted Marmaduke's plan of action. Maxey ordered his two brigades, commanded by Colonels Charles DeMorse and Tandy Walker, to dismount and advance up the back side of the ridge that bordered the field. DeMorse's men were Texans, and Walker's were Choctaws. DeMorse's men came under Union fire when they reached the crest of the ridge. DeMorse's men were ordered to shift west, which forced Walker's brigade to move as well; this caused delays. While this was occurring, the Confederates were reinforced by the 14th Missouri Cavalry Battalion, which was positioned on Crawford's right flank. Altogether, the Confederates had 3,621 available for the fight.

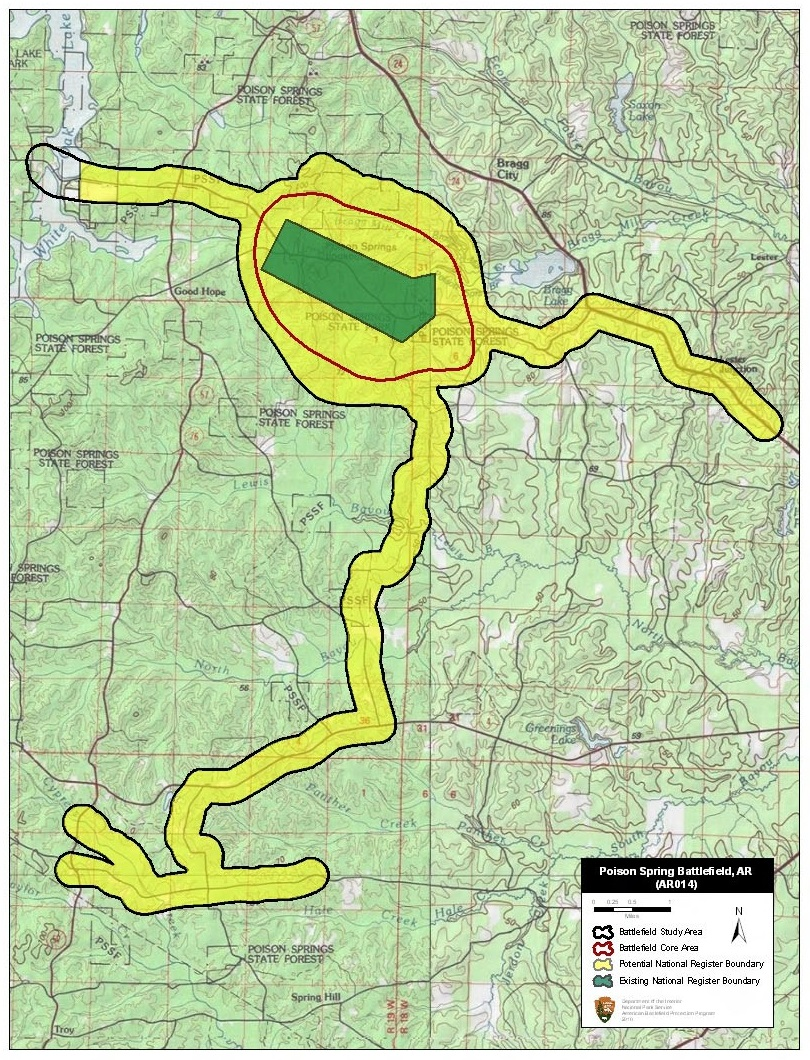
Map of the battlefield prepared by the American Battlefield Protection Program

Williams had initially formed his men into two lines, one to the east of the wagons and the other to the west, both of which faced east. The eastern line was composed of the 1st Kansas Colored, the two James rifles, and some cavalry. The cavalry held the flanks, with the James rifles along the road and half of the 1st Kansas Colored on either side of the road. The men of the relief column made up the line west of the wagons. The commander of the relief column, Captain William M. Duncan, was ordered to watch for a Confederate attempt to outflank the Union right. Maxey's artillery component, Krumbhaar's Texas Battery, had been unable to position itself on the ridgeline in time to support the attack due to difficulty moving the guns through vegetation on the ridge. While Maxey moved his men into position, Marmaduke opened fire with his two artillery batteries. Between Marmaduke's artillery and Krumbhaar's battery, the Confederates had 12 cannon, which were positioned to bring crossfire on the Union lines, in a barrage that last for about half an hour.

The Confederate artillery fire caused few casualties, as the Union troops lay down to avoid the fire. Williams became aware of the presence of Maxey's men and redeployed his lines. Four companies of the 1st Kansas Colored and one James rifle continued to face east, while four more companies and the other James rifle turned to face south; the other two companies of the regiment were held in reserve. About 100 men from the 2nd and 6th Kansas Cavalry probed Maxey's line, and the relief column turned to face south. The cavalry probe was repulsed and took up a position between the 1st Kansas Colored and the relief column; the force's commander was wounded in the attack.

=== Confederate attacks ===
Maxey's men attacked the Union line. DeMorse's men fought the 1st Kansas Colored; the shooting occurred at a range within 100 yards (90 m). More than half of the crew of the James rifle facing south became casualties. Walker's attack against the 18th Iowa was more passive. The flank of Walker's brigade was harassed by men from the 6th Kansas Cavalry, and Walker halted his men to deal with the threat. Maxey's attack was repulsed. Marmaduke's men began moving forward, but a gap formed between Cabell's brigade and Maxey's division. This gap was plugged with Greene's brigade. Williams sent the two reserve companies to the wing facing south. The James rifle facing south was withdrawn after most of its gun crew was shot or left to take cover, but a round of double-shotted canister from it halted Maxey's men long enough to prevent its capture. DeMorse and Greene fought the 1st Kansas Colored at close range, while Cabell's men drove in Union skirmishers to the east. The Union line held, and the Confederates again withdrew.

After the repulse of the second Confederate attack, Williams's soldiers were running out of ammunition for both their small arms and artillery. Williams held out hope that the sounds of the battle would reach Camden and that Steele would send reinforcements. While the fighting was audible in Camden, Steele did not attempt to aid the foraging party, for reasons that are unknown. While trying to reach the 18th Iowa to order the regiment to be repositioned, Williams's horse was shot out from under him. While the Union commander was given a replacement mount, he was unable to redeploy the Iowa unit before the third Confederate attack struck. This attack was better coordinated than the prior Confederate attempts. DeMorse's men pressured the portion of the 1st Iowa facing south, while Greene and Cabell drove west. Crawford's brigade was able to outflank the portion of the 1st Kansas Colored that was facing east, and the Kansans began to give way. While the left of the 1st Kansas Colored fell back, Cabell struck the regiment's left center. The Confederates drove the 1st Kansas Colored back through the wagon train, murdering many wounded Union soldiers on the field. The sight of their comrades being murdered caused part of the 1st Kansas Colored to flee to the rear.

Williams decided to abandon the wagon train and focus on saving his remaining men. While part of the 1st Kansas Colored rallied to form a line with the 18th Iowa, the Iowa soldiers were swamped by fleeing Kansans and charging Confederates. The Iowans were supported by the Union artillery. The 18th Iowa, supported by fragments of the 1st Kansas Colored, conducted a fighting withdrawal, making stands at successive ridgelines north of the road. Walker's Confederates looted the wagon train instead of fighting the Iowans. The Union troops abandoned their cannons when terrain was reached that the guns could not be moved over and continued for Camden via a circuitous route, pursued by the Confederates for 2.5 miles (4 km). Marmaduke wished to continue the pursuit further, but Maxey called it off. The latter officer was concerned that Union reinforcements would arrive from Camden and strike his men while they were scattered. Some of the Union troops ran into the position of the 2nd Arkansas Cavalry east of the battlefield, while others forced a civilian at gunpoint to guide them back to Camden away from the Confederates. The Confederates captured 170 wagons (the others had been burnt), 1,200 mules, and the four Union cannons. As well as food, the Confederates found the captured wagons contained clothes, tools, and household furnishings.

== Massacre ==
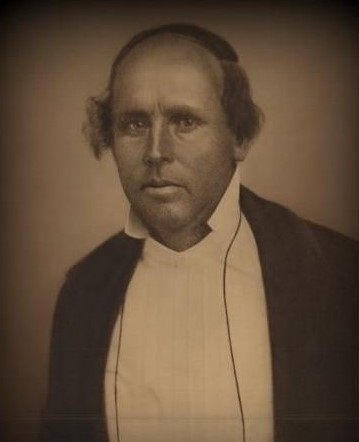
Former Choctaw Chief and Colonel Tandy Walker, led the Choctaw forces during the battle

Williams's force suffered 301 casualties during the action. The 1st Kansas Colored alone lost 182 men of whom 117 were killed and 65 wounded; it was unusual during the war for units to have more men killed than wounded. Three companies lost all of their officers. In comparison, Confederate losses were reported at 114 men killed, wounded, or missing, although records are incomplete; the historian Mark K. Christ states that a complete tabulation of Confederate losses would likely be fewer than 145. Cabell's men suffered the highest overall Confederate casualties, but as a percentage of strength, Maxey's losses were higher. The historian Gregory J. W. Urwin describes the aftermath of the battle as an "orgy of barbarism". Some of Cabell's men, when tasked with removing the wagons from the battlefield, made a game out of running over fallen African-American soldiers' heads with the wagons. The battle became known as the Poison Spring massacre. Wounded African-American troops were shot on the ground, and others were killed while trying to surrender. Maxey's men were seen bayonetting the wounded. The Confederate leaders did not include the massacre in their official reports, but hinted at the slaughter. Cabell wrote "The number of killed of the enemy was very great, especially among the negroes". Walker stated that his men were motivated by the thought of shedding "the blood of their despised enemy...the ravagers of their country, the despoilers of their homes, and the murderers of their women and children." DeMorse's report included the statement that "few prisoners were brought in by my command".

Walker's Choctaws participated the most in the atrocities. Claims circulated that the Choctaws scalped some of the dead, and a local Confederate newspaper reported that the Choctaws had buried a Union soldier with a dead African-American soldier sticking out of the ground from the waist up as a headstone and another half-buried upside down as a footstone. Union soldiers who visited the battlefield several days later to bury the dead found three Union officers scalped, naked, and face down surrounded by an arranged circle of dead African Americans. Some Confederates, including DeMorse, suggested that the brutality was a result of outrage at the looting done by the Union troops, but the historian Thomas A. DeBlack notes that this does not explain why the Confederates only behaved in this fashion towards the 1st Kansas Colored, and not the white units in the foraging party. Urwin suggests that the primary looting was done by the white Kansas cavalrymen, not the men of the 1st Kansas Colored. He also describes the massacre as the "worst war crime ever committed on Arkansas soil", and concludes that the killings represented "an ongoing program of racial intimidation" to control the behavior of slaves, instead of random acts of violence. The historian Anne J. Bailey notes that some of the Texans may also have been motivated by revenge for being badly defeated by the 1st Kansas Colored in the Battle of Honey Springs and that the Missouri Confederates may have been motivated by a history of hatred between Missourians and Kansans that dated back a decade to a time known as Bleeding Kansas.

The Washington Telegraph, at that point the leading pro-Confederate newspaper in the state, praised the Confederate leaders and soldiers in the battle, with only one reference to the massacre in a story about using dead soldiers as grave markers under the heading "Choctaw Humor". The paper's editor, John R. Eakin, later published an editorial regarding Confederate response to the Union's use of African-American soldiers stating that "we cannot treat Negroes taken in arms as prisoners of war" and that "our soldiers are not bound to receive their surrender"; an article published by the journal American Journalism in 2005 suggests that Eakin was rationalizing the massacre at Poison Spring. The Fort Smith New Era, a significant pro-Union newspaper, in turn reported accounts of the massacre.

== Aftermath and preservation ==
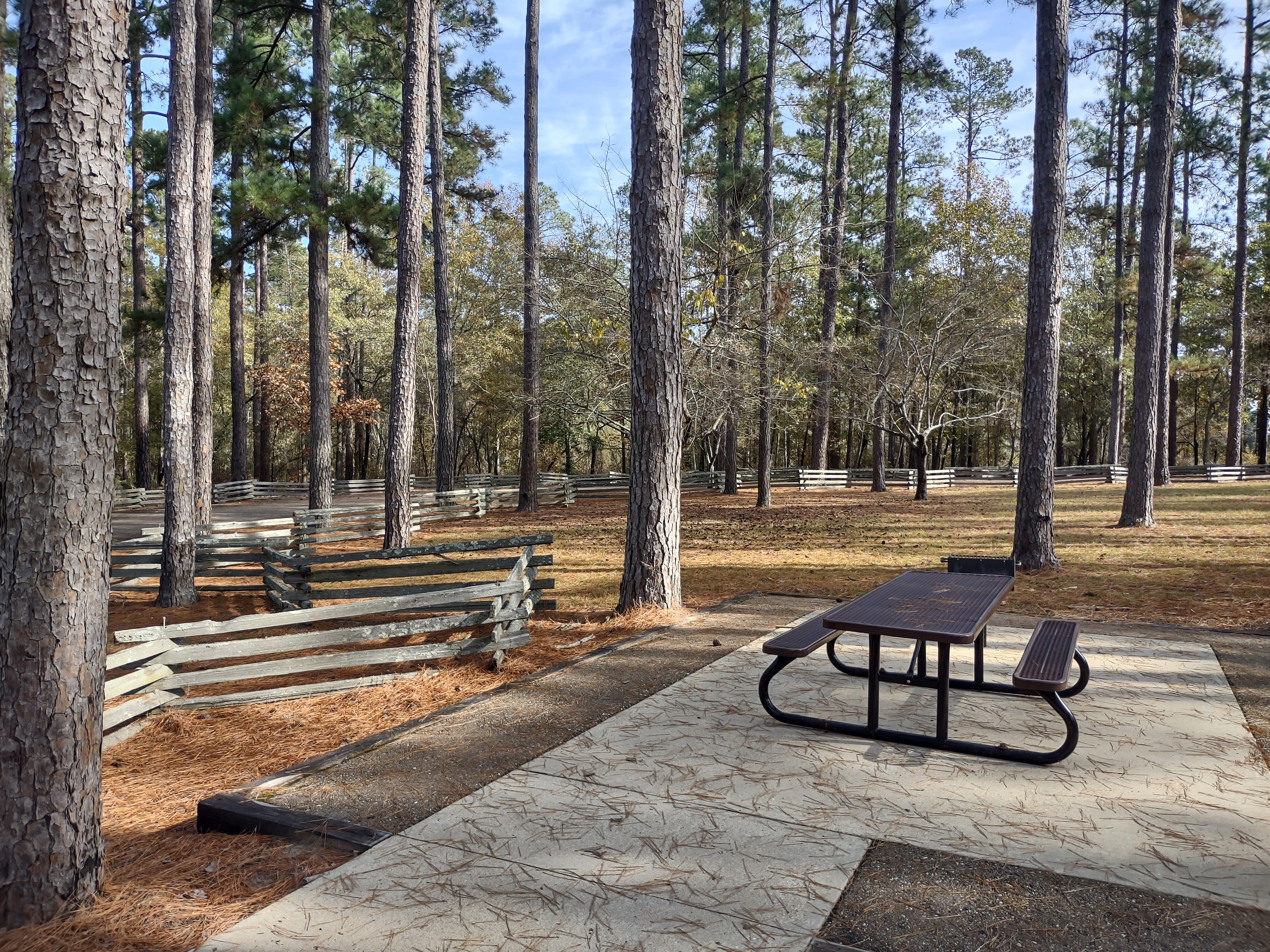
Poison Springs Battleground State Park in November 2023

On April 20, Steele's men received a supply train from Pine Bluff carrying 10 days' rations, but when the wagons went to return to Pine Bluff, they were captured and their escort destroyed in the Battle of Marks' Mills. Reports spread that the Confederates murdered African-American noncombatants at Marks' Mills; Urwin states that over 100 were likely killed. Steele had also been informed by a scout of Banks's defeat. Smith transferred three divisions of infantry from Louisiana to fight against Steele; the Confederate infantrymen crossed the Red River on April 15 and 16. Steele decided to abandon Camden, and his men left the city on April 26. On April 29, the vanguard of Steele's force reached the Saline River at Jenkins' Ferry. The area was inundated by heavy rains, and the Union troops had to build a pontoon bridge. The wagons crossed slowly.

The next day, Smith attacked Steele's rearguard, in what became the Battle of Jenkins' Ferry. Smith's assaults were repulsed, and Steele's men were able to escape across the Saline River. Men of the 2nd Kansas Colored Infantry Regiment, in response to the massacre at Poison Spring, executed several prisoners captured from Ruffner's Missouri Battery, and cut the throats of Confederate wounded lying on the field. The officers of the 2nd Kansas Colored had, after Poison Spring, sworn that "the regiment would take no prisoners as long as the Rebels continued to murder our men". Nine severely wounded men from the 2nd Kansas Colored were left behind along with other Union wounded after the battle and were later killed by the Confederates. Steele's men reached Little Rock on May 3. DeBlack describes the Camden Expedition as the "greatest Federal military disaster of the Civil War in Arkansas".

The site of the battlefield is preserved within Poison Springs Battleground State Park, which is part of the Camden Expedition Sites National Historic Landmark. Writing in 2000, Urwin noted that the Arkansas Department of Parks and Tourism, which managed the park at the time, "tended to ignore the dark deeds that stained that particular patch of hallowed ground". The state park is located 12 miles (19 km) from Camden, Arkansas and includes 84 acres of the battlefield. The Camden Expedition Sites National Historic Landmark, which includes the Poison Spring battleground as well as other sites related to Steele's campaign, was listed on the National Register of Historic Places in 1994.

== See also ==
- List of American Civil War battles
- Troop engagements of the American Civil War, 1864

== Sources ==
- Bailey, Anne J. (1990). "Was There a Massacre at Poison Spring?". Military History of the Southwest. 20 (2): 157–168.
- Bearss, Edwin C. (1967). Steele's Retreat from Camden and the Battle of Jenkins' Ferry. Little Rock, Arkansas: Pioneer Press. OCLC 1843035.
- Christ, Mark K. (2010). Civil War Arkansas 1863: The Battle for a State. Norman, Oklahoma: University of Oklahoma Press. ISBN 978-0-8061-4433-7.
- Christ, Mark K. (January 29, 2024). "Poison Spring, Engagement at". Encyclopedia of Arkansas.
- DeBlack, Thomas A. (2003a). "An Overview of the Camden Expedition". In Christ, Mark K. (ed.). "All Cut to Pieces and Gone to Hell": The Civil War, Race Relations, and the Battle of Poison Spring. Little Rock, Arkansas: August House. pp. 11–30. ISBN 0-87483-736-7.
- DeBlack, Thomas A. (2003b). With Fire and Sword: Arkansas, 1861–1874. Fayetteville, Arkansas: University of Arkansas Press. ISBN 1-55728-740-6.
- Forsyth, Michael J. (2003). The Camden Expedition of 1864. Jefferson, North Carolina: McFarland & Company. ISBN 0-7864-1554-1.
- Johnson, Ludwell H. (1993) [1958]. Red River Campaign: Politics and Cotton in the Civil War. Kent, Ohio: Kent State University Press. ISBN 0-87338-486-5.
- Johnson, Ludwell H. (1998). "Military Strategy, Politics, and Economics: The Red River Campaign". In Kennedy, Frances H. (ed.). The Civil War Battlefield Guide (2nd ed.). Boston/New York: Houghton Mifflin. pp. 265–266. ISBN 978-0-395-74012-5.
- Kennedy, Frances H. (1998). The Civil War Battlefield Guide (2nd ed.). New York/Boston: Houghton Mifflin. ISBN 978-0-395-74012-5.
- Moneyhon, Carl H. (2003). "White Society and African-American Soldiers". In Christ, Mark K. (ed.). "All Cut to Pieces and Gone to Hell": The Civil War, Race Relations, and the Battle of Poison Spring. Little Rock, Arkansas: August House. pp. 31–57. ISBN 0-87483-736-7.
- Rhodes, Sonny (2005). "Opposite Extremes: How Two Editors Portrayed A Civil War Atrocity". American Journalism. 22 (4): 27–45. doi:10.1080/08821127.2005.10677979. ISSN 0882-1127. OCLC 1075937713.
- Sutherland, Daniel E. (1994). "1864: "A Strange, Wild Time"". In Christ, Mark K. (ed.). Rugged and Sublime: The Civil War in Arkansas. Fayetteville, Arkansas: University of Arkansas Press. pp. 105–144. ISBN 1-55728-356-7.
- Urwin, Gregory J. W. (2000). ""We Cannot Treat Negroes ... as Prisoners of War": Racial Atrocities and Reprisals in Civil War Arkansas". In Bailey, Anne J.; Sutherland, Daniel E. (eds.). Civil War Arkansas: Beyond Battles and Leaders. Fayetteville, Arkansas: University of Arkansas Press. pp. 213–229. ISBN 1-55728-565-9.
- Urwin, Gregory J. W. (2003). "Poison Spring and Jenkins' Ferry: Racial Atrocities during the Camden Expedition". In Christ, Mark K. (ed.). "All Cut to Pieces and Gone to Hell": The Civil War, Race Relations, and the Battle of Poison Spring. Little Rock, Arkansas: August House. pp. 107–137. ISBN 0-87483-736-7.
