= Hampton Roads Conference =

1865 American Civil War conference

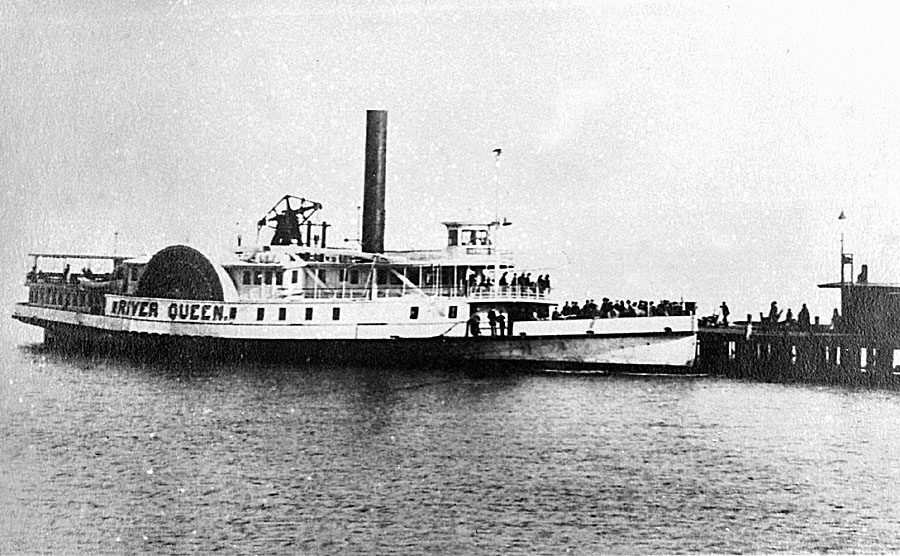
- The Conference took place on the River Queen, near Union-controlled Fort Monroe in Hampton, Virginia.
- Negotiators: United States: President Abraham Lincoln Secretary of State William H. Seward: Confederate States: Vice President Alexander H. Stephens Assistant Secretary of War John A. Campbell Senator Robert M. T. Hunter

The Hampton Roads Conference was a peace conference held between the United States and representatives of the unrecognized breakaway Confederate States on February 3, 1865, aboard the steamboat River Queen in Hampton Roads, Virginia, to discuss terms to end the American Civil War. President Abraham Lincoln and Secretary of State William H. Seward, representing the Union, met with three commissioners from the Confederacy: Vice President Alexander H. Stephens, Senator Robert M. T. Hunter, and Assistant Secretary of War John A. Campbell.

The representatives discussed a possible alliance against France, the possible terms of surrender, the question of whether slavery might persist after the war, and the question of whether the South would be compensated for property lost through emancipation. Lincoln and Seward reportedly offered some possibilities for compromise on the issue of slavery. The only concrete agreement reached was regarding prisoner-of-war exchanges.

The Confederate commissioners immediately returned to Richmond at the conclusion of the conference. Confederate President Jefferson Davis announced that the North would not compromise. Lincoln drafted an amnesty agreement based on terms discussed at the Conference, but met with opposition from his Cabinet. John Campbell continued to advocate for a peace agreement and met again with Lincoln after the fall of Richmond on April 2.

== Overtures for peace ==
In 1864, pressure mounted for both sides to seek a peace settlement to end the long and devastating Civil War. Several people had sought to broker a North–South peace treaty in 1864. Francis Preston Blair, a personal friend of both Abraham Lincoln and Jefferson Davis, had unsuccessfully encouraged Lincoln to make a diplomatic visit to Richmond. Blair had advocated to Lincoln that the war could be brought to a close by having the two opposing sections of the nation stand down in their conflict, and reunite on grounds of the Monroe Doctrine in attacking the French-installed Emperor Maximilian I of Mexico. Lincoln asked Blair to wait until Savannah had been captured.

=== South ===
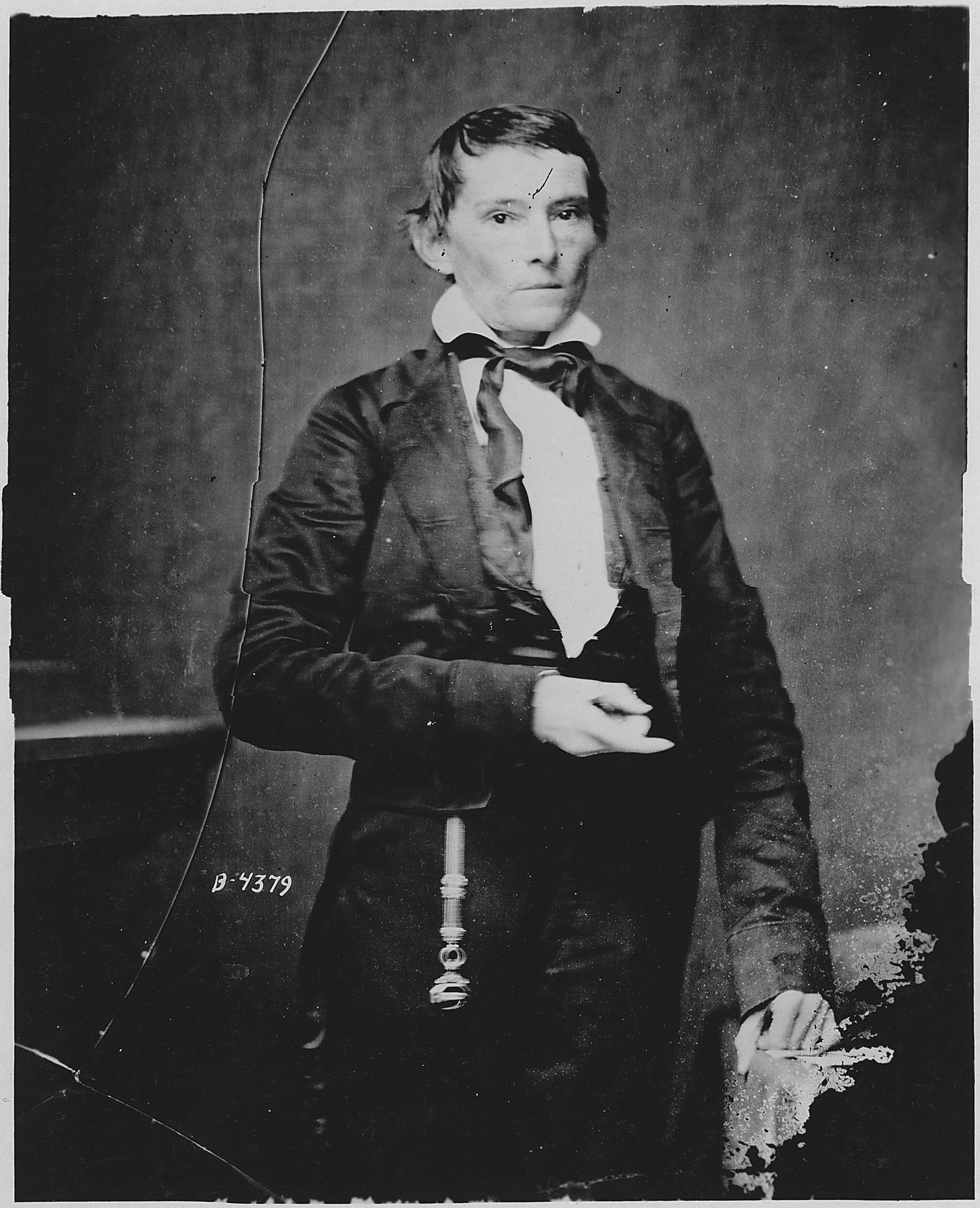
CSA Vice President Alexander Stephens had been trying to end the war since 1863.

Davis was pressed for options as the Confederacy faced collapse and defeat. Peace movements in the South had been active since the beginning of the war and intensified in 1864 in the face of widespread shortages of food, medicine, and other goods.

==== Alexander Stephens ====
Alexander H. Stephens, Vice President of the Confederate States, had by 1863 become an active advocate for ending the war. Stephens came close to negotiations with Lincoln in July 1863 as the South achieved several military victories, but his efforts were thwarted by the defeat at Gettysburg. By 1864, Stephens had thoroughly lost faith in Davis's leadership, and accepted an invitation by General William T. Sherman to discuss independent peace negotiations between the State of Georgia and the federal Union.

Stephens addressed the Confederate States Senate as its nominal presiding officer in Richmond on January 6, 1865, requesting approval to open formal negotiations with the United States government. Though most of the Senate remained committed to the war effort, a number of senators made it known that they supported Stephens.

==== John Campbell ====
John Campbell, another of the peace commissioners, had also opposed secession. Campbell served earlier on the Supreme Court of the United States from 1853 to 1861, but began to consider resignation after Abraham Lincoln's first inaugural address in March 1861. He stayed on for the spring term of 1861 and supported the Corwin Amendment to protect slavery from federal intervention.

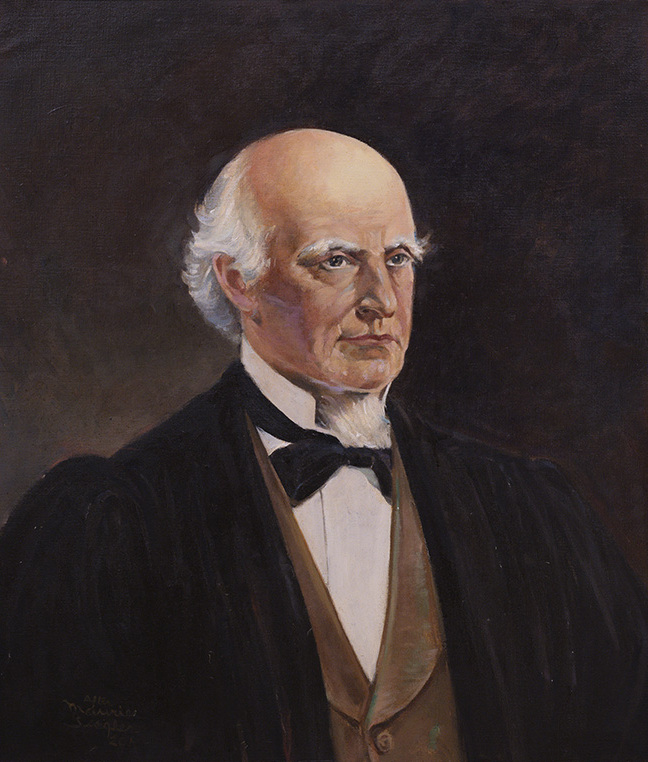
John A. Campbell had already attempted once to broker peace between Confederates and the Lincoln administration.

Hoping to prevent a war, Campbell's colleague Justice Samuel Nelson enlisted Campbell to help broker negotiations over the status of Fort Sumter in Charleston harbor in South Carolina. On March 15, Campbell relayed to Martin Jenkins Crawford a supposed promise from Secretary of State Seward that the federal government would evacuate Fort Sumter within five days. As the Fort remained occupied on March 21, Confederate commissioners pushed Campbell to find out more; Seward reassured Campbell that evacuation would take place and Campbell reassured Crawford: on March 21, March 22, April 1, and hesitantly on April 7. Lincoln had already ordered the fort resupplied. By April 12, diplomacy had evidently failed and the Bombardment of Fort Sumter began. Campbell resigned his position on the Supreme Court and went South. Fearing he would be persecuted as a Union sympathizer in his home state of Alabama, he moved instead to New Orleans.

Campbell declined a number of positions in the CSA government, but accepted the post of Assistant Secretary of War in President Davis' cabinet in 1862. For the duration of the job, Campbell was criticized for trying to limit the scope of wartime conscription.

By late 1864, he was pushing again for an end to the war. In an 1865 letter to Judge Benjamin R. Curtis, he described the disastrous state of the Confederacy and marveled: "You would suppose there could be no difficulty in convincing men under such circumstances that peace was required. But when I look back upon the events of the winter, I find that I was incessantly employed in making these facts known and to no result."

=== North ===
Lincoln would clearly insist on full sovereignty of the Union. Slavery posed a more difficult problem. The Republican platform in 1864 had explicitly endorsed abolition; but pushing too hard on the slavery issue might offend mainstream politicians and voters. Within this precarious political situation, in July 1864 Lincoln issued a statement via Horace Greeley:

To Whom It May Concern? Any proposition which embraces the restoration of peace, the integrity of the whole Union, and the abandonment of Slavery, and which comes by and with authority that can control the armies now at war against the United States, will be received and considered by the Executive Government of the United States, and will be met by liberal terms on other substantial and collateral points; and the bearer or bearers thereof shall have safe conduct both ways.

Lincoln confided to James W. Singleton that his primary concern was the Union. In Singleton's words: "that he never has and never will present any other ultimatum—that he is misunderstood on the subject of slavery—that it shall not stand in the way of peace". Lincoln's reassurance earned him Singleton's support in the 1864 election.

Seward openly suggested in September 1864 that if the Confederate States relented on the question of independence, the question of slavery would fall "to the arbitrament of courts of law, and to the councils of legislation". (He did not mention the ongoing debate over what became the Thirteenth Amendment, and declined to clarify his position in written correspondence.) Seward invited the South to return to the "common ark of our national security and happiness" as "brethren who have come back from their wanderings".

Having won the election, Lincoln told Congress that reaching a peace agreement with Davis would be unlikely: "He affords us no excuse to deceive ourselves. He cannot voluntarily reaccept the Union; we cannot voluntarily yield it." However, said Lincoln, the South could end the War by laying down arms:

They can, at any moment, have peace simply by laying down their arms and submitting to the national authority under the Constitution. [...] If questions should remain, we would adjust them by the peaceful means of legislation, conference, courts, and votes, operating only in constitutional and lawful channels. [...] In presenting the abandonment of armed resistance to the national authority on the part of the insurgents, as the only indispensable condition to ending the war on the part of the government, I retract nothing heretofore said as to slavery. I repeat the declaration made a year ago, that while I remain in my present position I shall not attempt to retract or modify the emancipation proclamation, nor shall I return to slavery any person who is free by the terms of that proclamation, or by any of the Acts of Congress.

== Preparation for conference ==
Blair duly renewed his efforts in January 1865, and traveled to Richmond on January 11. He met with Davis and outlined a plan to end the war, based partly on a North–South alliance against the French presence in Mexico. Blair assured Davis that Lincoln had become more willing to negotiate.

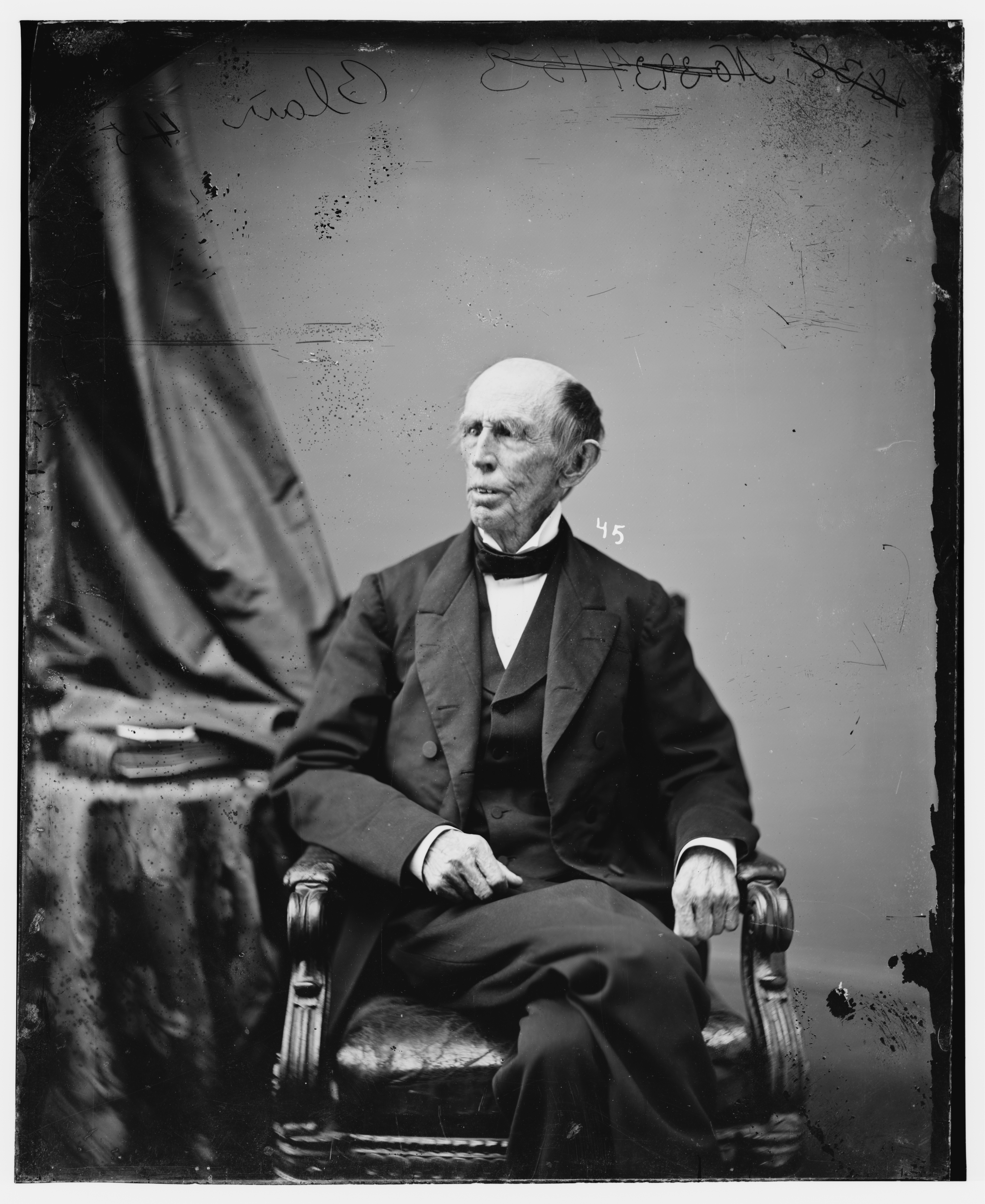
Francis Preston Blair traveled back and forth between Richmond, VA, and Washington, DC, relaying messages between Davis and Lincoln.

On January 12, Davis wrote a letter inviting Lincoln to begin negotiations "with a view to secure peace to the two countries". Lincoln replied, via Blair, that he would discuss only "securing peace to the people of one common country." Davis was upset by this response; Blair blamed the political climate in Washington.

At Blair's suggestion, Davis proposed having Generals Robert E. Lee and Ulysses S. Grant meet as representatives of their respective governments; Lincoln refused. Grant ultimately smoothed over the "two countries" dispute and convinced Lincoln to meet the Confederates at Fort Monroe. Davis appointed his three commissioners on January 28 and instructed them to explore all options short of renouncing independence. (Davis's precise understanding of what an "independent" Confederacy might be, in 1865, is not fully clear.)

Of the three commissioners, Alexander Stephens and Robert Hunter wanted to focus more on the possibility of an alliance against France; Campbell focused more on a scenario for domestic peace. Campbell wrote in his letter to Curtis:

He duped Mr. Davis with the belief that President Lincoln regarded the condition of Mexico with more concern than the war; that he would be willing to make a suspension of hostilities under some sort of collusive contract, and to unite Southern and Northern troops on the Rio Grande for the invasion of Mexico, and that after matters were assured in Mexico affairs might be adjusted here. This was the business at Hampton Roads. I was incredulous, Mr. Hunter did not have faith. Mr. Stephens supposed Blair to be "the mentor of the Administration and Republican party.

The Union Congress was shaken by the news of possible Confederate peace negotiations in late January, just days before a rescheduled Thirteenth Amendment vote. Some Congress members feared that adopting an emancipation amendment would signal hostility and undermine the talks.

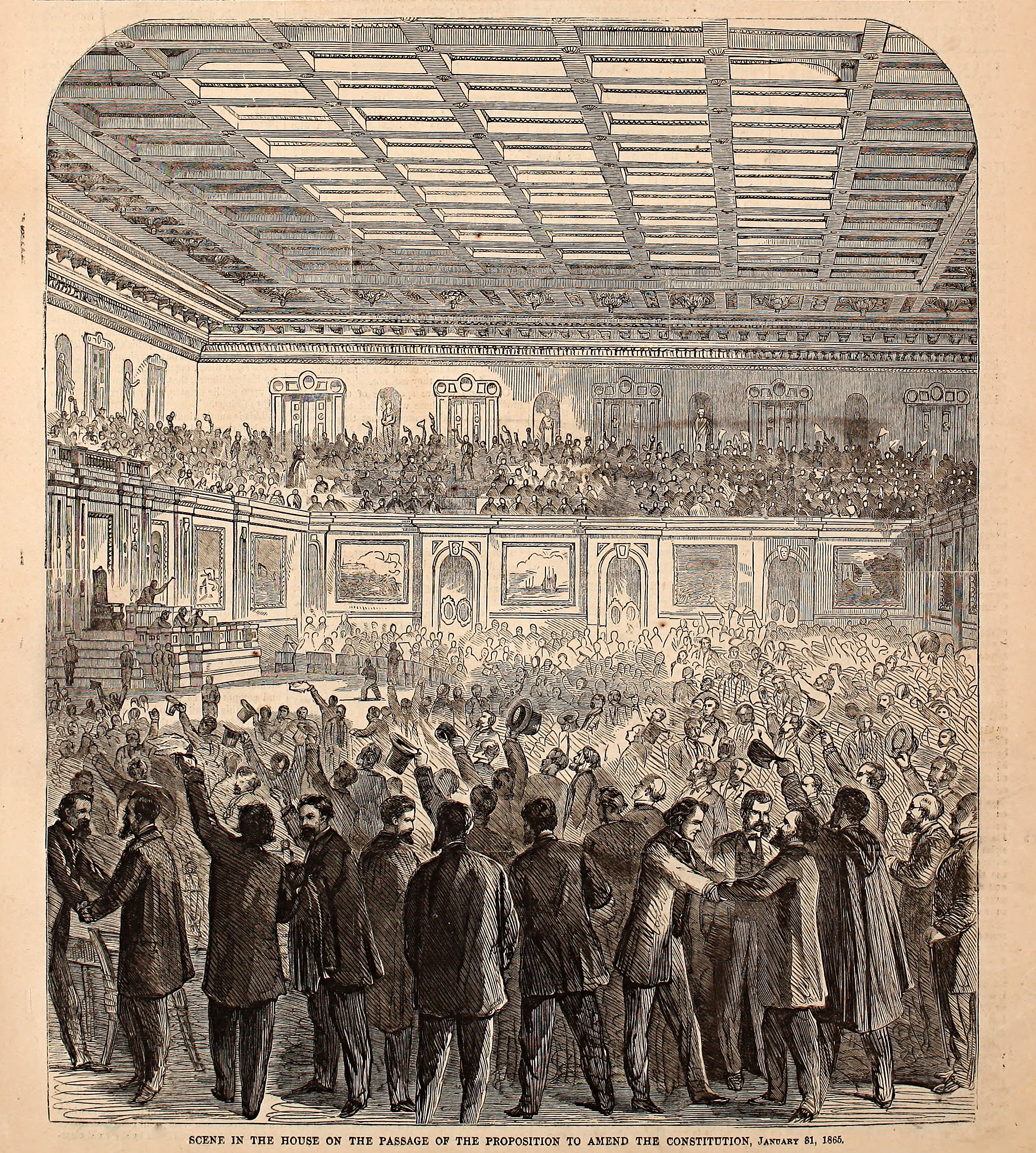
The Thirteenth Amendment passed despite fears connected to the peace talks.

Radical Republicans, hoping for a complete victory and stringent terms of surrender, were dismayed by the prospect of a compromise. Opponents of the Amendment exploited these fears in an attempt to prevent its passage in the House. (Stephens later blamed this political reaction for the failure of the Conference.)

Reassurance from Lincoln's secretary John Hay was not convincing to Ohio Democrat Sunset Cox who demanded that Ashley investigate the rumor of impending negotiations. Lincoln issued a memo denying the arrival of Confederates—in Washington.

Cox investigated further, decided that Lincoln was "mistaken or ignorant", and shocked a crowd of onlookers by voting 'nay' to the Amendment. When the Amendment passed anyway, two members of the "Seward lobby"—George O. Jones and William Bilbo—both telegraphed congratulations to Seward and commented on his upcoming meeting with the Confederate diplomats. Historians LaWanda Cox and John Cox (no relation to Sunset Cox) wrote: "It is worthy of note that these messages of Jones and Bilbo implied a verbal commitment from the Secretary of State that passage of the Amendment would be coupled with a policy of peace and reconciliation which Southerners might accept with relief and Northern Democrats with enthusiasm."

On January 29, a Confederate officer with a flag of truce interrupted the Siege of Petersburg to announce the passage of the three Confederate peace commissioners. Soldiers from both armies cheered. On February 1, Seward dropped off a copy of the new amendment in Annapolis, then departed with the River Queen for Fort Monroe.

== Conference ==
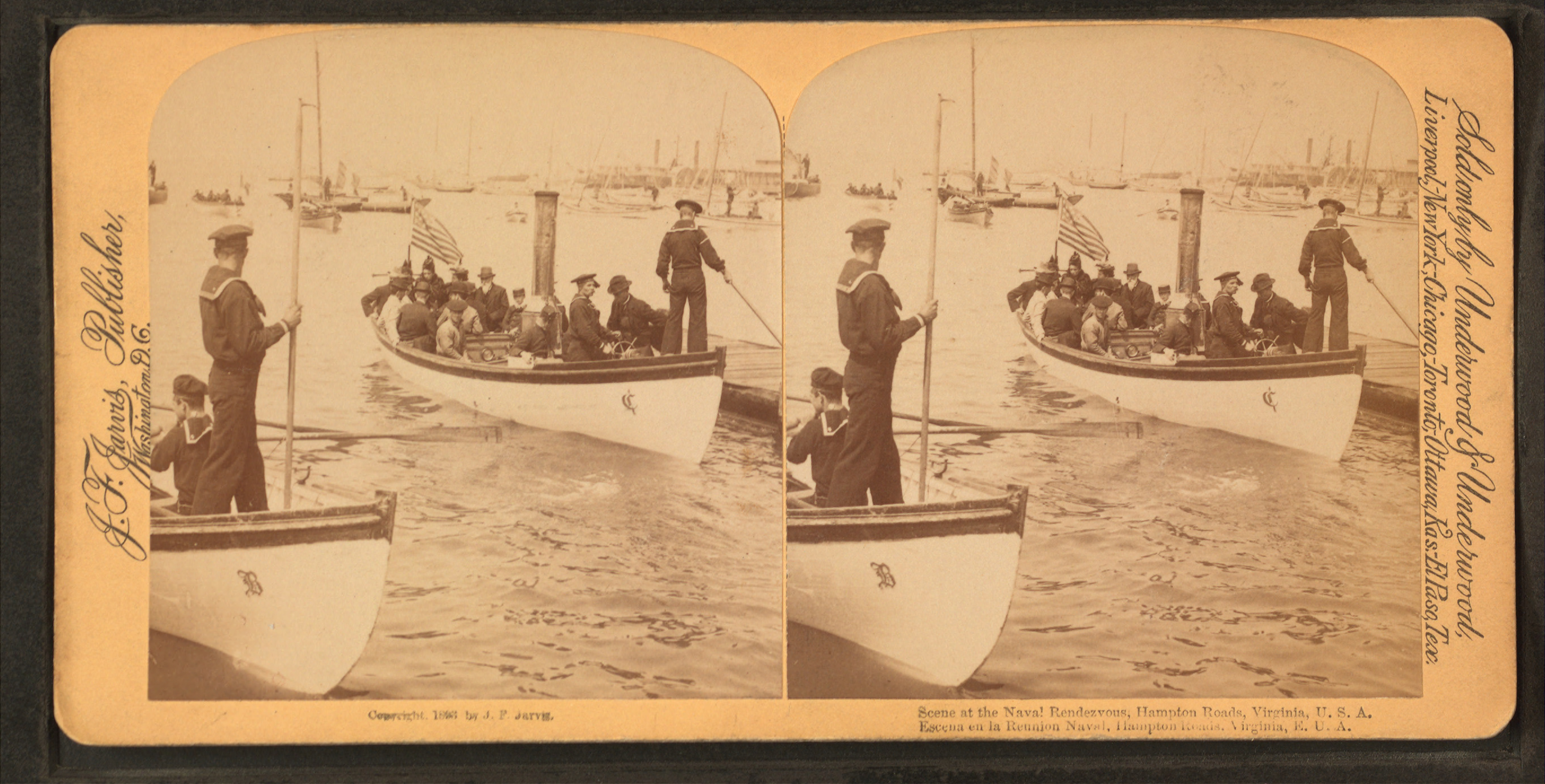
Scene from Hampton Roads, Virginia.

Lincoln and Stephens had been political allies before the war and the meeting began on friendly terms. Stephens discussed the topic of a military alliance against France in Mexico, but Lincoln cut him off and asked directly about the question of sovereignty. Prodded by Campbell, Lincoln insisted that the South would have to disband its armies and submit to federal authority. Campbell wrote: "We learned in five minutes that the assurances to Mr. Davis were a delusion, and that union was the condition of peace."

On the question of slavery, Lincoln reportedly told the Confederates that Northern opinion was divided on the question of how new laws would be enforced. Regarding the Emancipation Proclamation, Lincoln reportedly interpreted it as a war measure that would permanently affect only the 200,000 people who came under Army protection during the War—but noted that the Courts might feel differently.

Seward reportedly showed the Confederates a copy of the newly adopted Thirteenth Amendment, referred to this document also as a war measure, and suggested that if they were to rejoin the Union they might be able to prevent its ratification. After further discussion, Lincoln suggested that the Southern states might "avoid, as far as possible, the evils of immediate emancipation" by ratifying the Amendment "prospectively, so as to take effect—say in five years." Seward and Lincoln denied that they were demanding "unconditional surrender"; Seward said that rejoining the Union, under the Constitution, could not "properly be considered as unconditional submission to conquerors, or as having anything humiliating in it."

Lincoln also offered possible compensation for emancipation, perhaps naming the figure of $400,000,000 which he later proposed to Congress. Reportedly, Seward disagreed with Lincoln; Lincoln responded that the North had been complicit in the slave trade.

The Conference ended with agreement on prisoner-of-war exchange. Lincoln would release Stephens' nephew in exchange for a Northern official in Richmond—and would recommend that Grant establish a system for prisoner exchange.

=== Historical uncertainties ===
There are no official records of the conference itself, so all reports originate from the subsequent commentary of involved parties. The two lengthy accounts of the Conference—written by Confederates Stephens and Campbell—concur on most of the details. These accounts, along with secondary records from the archives of Lincoln and Seward, suggest that Lincoln and Seward would have compromised on the issue of slavery.

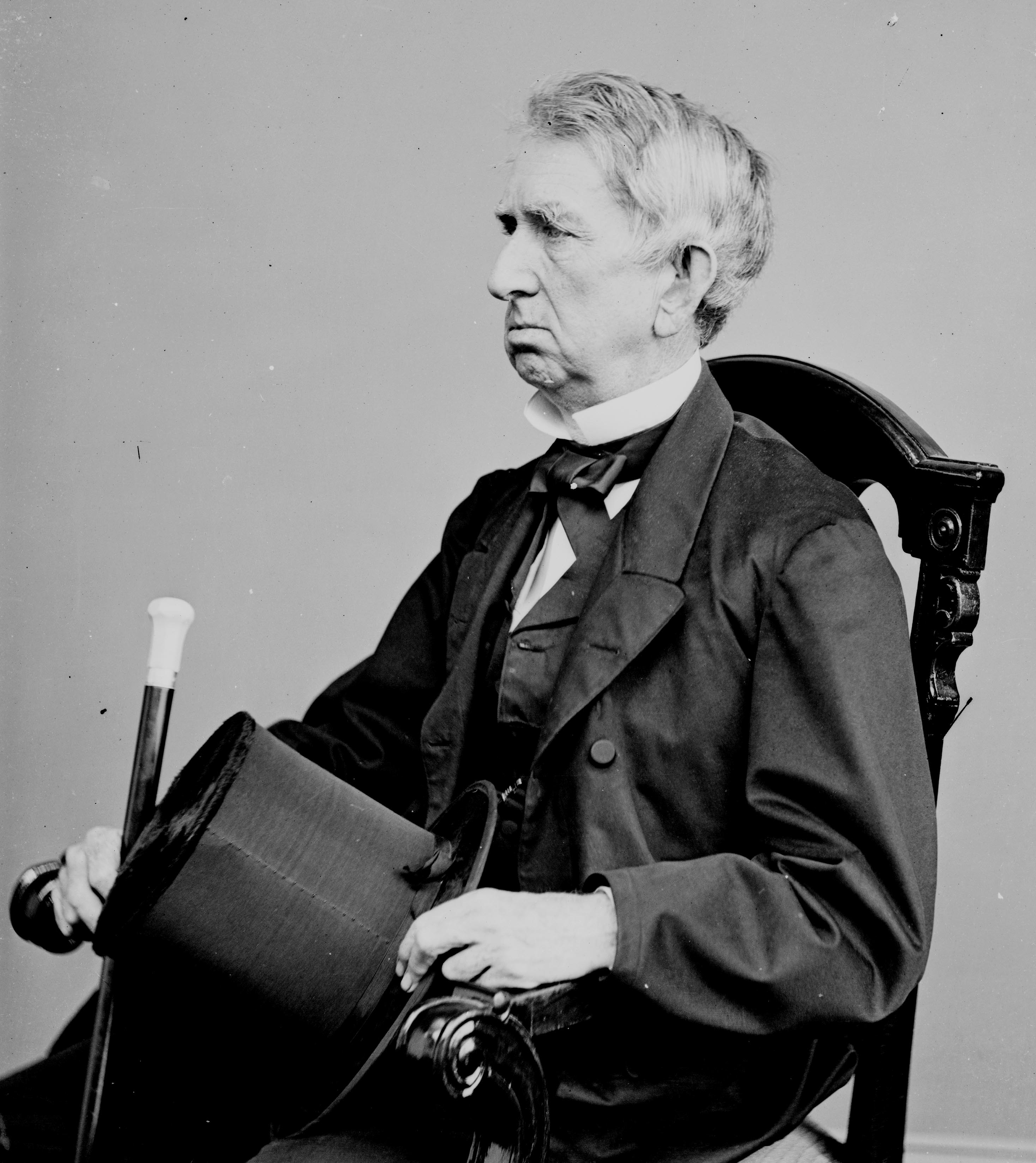
Did William Seward suggest that Confederate States could avert ratification of the Thirteenth Amendment by rejoining the Union?

Lincoln's personal communications, even from around the time of his To Whom it May Concern letter, indicate that he might have been willing to privately give ground on slavery. That Lincoln proposed a delayed ratification plan is mentioned by the Augusta Chronicle and Sentinel in June 1865—based on a report by Stephens from after the meeting. From a legal standpoint, Lincoln never believed that the federal government had the authority to ban slavery in the states—thus his constant emphasis on the status of the Emancipation Proclamation as a measure effective only during wartime. According to Paul Escott, Lincoln's moral opposition to slavery did not override his understanding of the Constitution; therefore, Lincoln may have believed that the rebel states would have a right to reject the Thirteenth Amendment if they rejoined the Union.

Seward's biographers generally agree that the Secretary of State may have suggested an outright rejection of the Amendment. The Confederate delegates spread word of this suggestion privately, contradicting Jefferson Davis's public statements that the surrender terms had been unconscionable.

Some historians dispute Stephens's interpretation of the Conference. Michael Vorenberg writes that Lincoln would have known that a constitutional amendment cannot be "prospectively" ratified, and therefore "the story is suspicious at best." Vorenberg suggests that although Lincoln might have expressed his preference for "gradual emancipation", he would not have sought to portray this option as legally or politically possible. William C. Harris also doubts the 'prospective ratification' story, on the grounds that this offer is not mentioned by Campbell in his 1865 letter to Curtis. James McPherson suggests: "It is probable that Stephens was reading his own viewpoint into Seward's remarks."

According to David Herbert Donald, Lincoln and Seward may have offered olive branches to the Confederates based on their sense that the institution of slavery was doomed and would end regardless. Relenting on the slavery issue might thus have prevented unnecessary warfare. Seward biographer Walter Stahr supports this inevitability theory, confirming that Seward would have accepted delay in ratification in order to end the war. Ludwell H. Johnson theorizes that peace negotiations reflected Lincoln's efforts to consolidate political power by creating "a new conservative coalition which would include Southerners". Johnson argues that negotiations would have built support among Northern Democrats as well as nascent Southern governments.

== Aftermath ==
Congress debated a resolution asking Lincoln to provide a report on the Conference. Willard Salisbury introduced an amendment stipulating that Lincoln reveal the precise terms he had offered. Salisbury's amendment failed and the resolution passed. Lincoln released a set of documents which met with an exceptionally positive reaction from Congress.

=== Response from Davis ===
Davis portrayed the conference in harsh terms, saying that Lincoln had demanded unconditional surrender and that the Confederacy must continue to fight. Some historians argue that Davis entered the Conference in bad faith to generate publicity around Northern hostility. Charles Sanders contends that Davis did not retain enough control over the negotiations to ensure they would serve his purpose, writing: "If Davis's motive, therefore, was to discredit the 'croakers,' he was running the enormous political risk that the negotiations might actually succeed." Sanders also argues that if Davis had intended to sabotage the Conference, he would not have considered such prominent representatives as Lee or Stephens. Stephens left Richmond and went home to Georgia on February 9.

=== Lincoln amnesty resolution ===
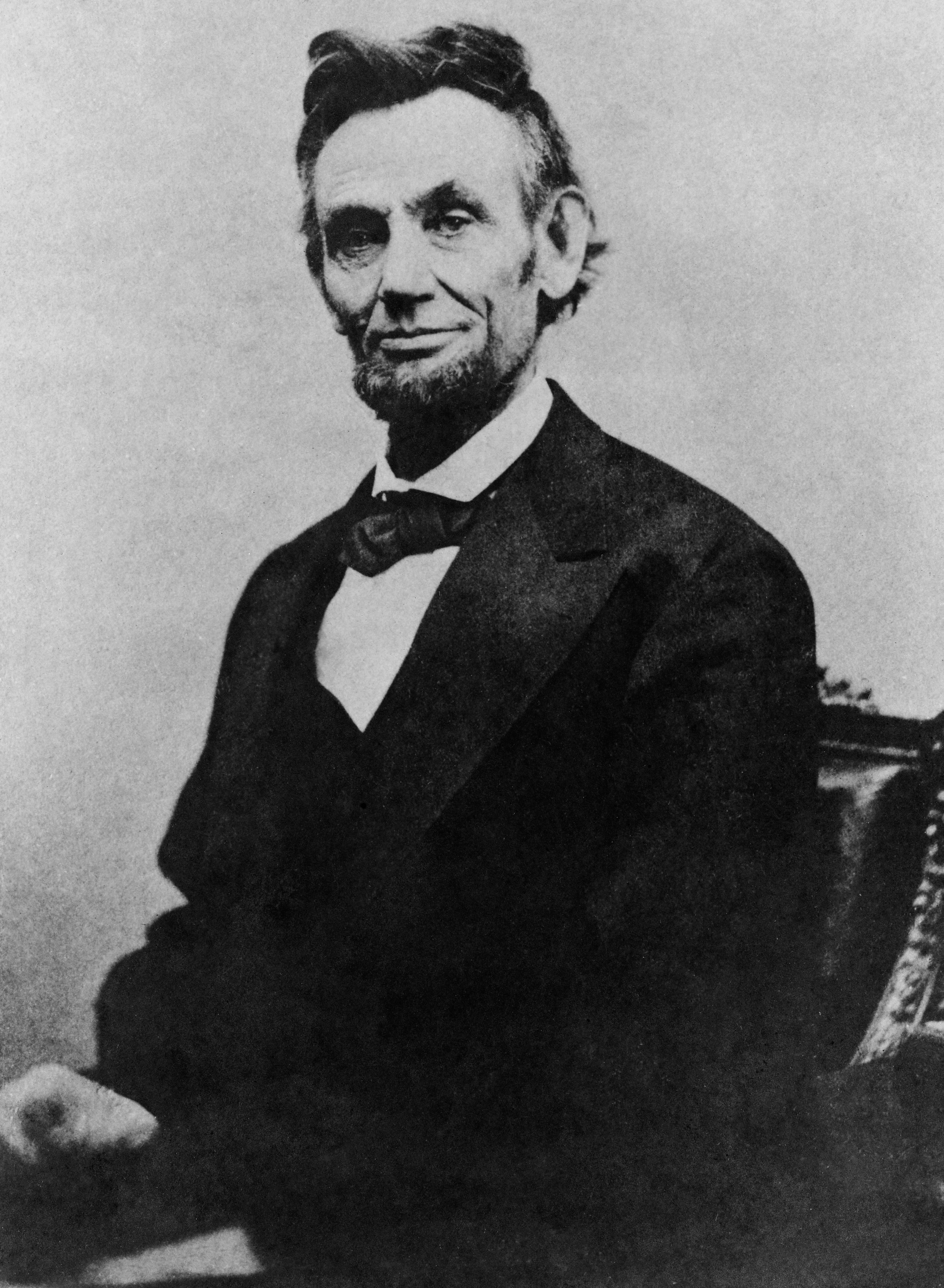
Abraham Lincoln pleased Congress with his report on the Conference, but couldn't gain its support for $400,000,000 compensating the South for emancipation.

Lincoln followed through on his promise to pursue compensation, requesting amnesty and $400,000,000 for the Southern states if they ended armed resistance and ratified the Thirteenth Amendment. Soon after returning to Washington, Lincoln wrote an amnesty resolution offering pardons and the return of confiscated property "except slaves". The resolution stipulated that the Confederacy would receive $200,000,000 if it ceased "resistance to national authority" before April 1, 1865, and $200,000,000 more for successful ratification of the Thirteenth amendment before July 1, 1865.

These terms were unpopular, particularly with Lincoln's (relatively Radical) cabinet, and no such resolution was adopted. The New York Herald reported that Seward had been seeking a peace agreement in order to bolster a new coalition of conservative Republicans and Democrats; "that Secretary Seward seized upon the movement to secure whatever éclat there might be connected with it, in hopes that if peace was the result he would be able to ride upon the wave of joy of a grateful people, and thus become the standard bearer of the great conservative party in 1868." (Johnson's "Presidential Reconstruction" would achieve some of these goals by other means.)

=== Lincoln–Campbell meetings ===
Campbell continued to push a peace settlement within the CSA, writing to John C. Breckinridge on March 5 that "The South may succomb [sic.] but it is not necessary that she should be destroyed." Campbell was the only member of the Confederate government to stay in Richmond after it fell to the Union. He met twice with Lincoln to discuss the future of the South. On April 5, Lincoln delivered the following message in writing:

As to peace, I have said before, and now repeat that three things are indispensable:

1. The restoration of the national authority throughout the United States.
2. No receding by the Executive of the United States on the slavery question from the position assumed thereon in the last annual message, and in preceding documents.
3. No cessation of hostilities short of an end of the war, and the disbanding of all forces hostile to the government. That all propositions coming from those now in hostility to the government, not inconsistent with the foregoing, will be respectfully considered and passed upon in a spirit of sincere liberality.

I now add that it seems useless for me to be more specific with those who will not say that they are ready for the indispensable terms, even on conditions to be named by themselves. If there be any who are ready for these indispensable terms, on any conditions whatever, let them say so, and state their conditions, so that the conditions can be known and considered. It is further added, that the remission of confiscation being within the executive power, if the war be now further persisted in by those opposing the government, the making of confiscated property at the least to bear the additional cost, will be insisted on, but that confiscations (except in case of third party intervening interests), will be remitted to the people of any State which shall now promptly and in good faith withdraw its troops from further resistance to the government. What is now said as to the remission of confiscation had no reference to supposed property in slaves.

According to Campbell, Lincoln said he would be willing to pardon most Confederates other than "Jeff Davis". Campbell pushed the peace terms advanced by Lincoln, but his letter to the CSA published on April 11 was undercut by Lee's Appomattox surrender on April 9.

Campbell was subsequently arrested under suspicion of conspiring to assassinate Lincoln, when his initials were discovered on an incriminating document.

== In culture ==
The 2012 film Lincoln includes a brief dramatization of the conference; the scenes on board the vessel were shot on an indoor set.

The Lincoln film scenes focus on the slavery aspect and the desire of the Confederates to block adoption of the Thirteenth Amendment if re-admitted to the Union. Neither Lincoln nor Seward suggests any compromise on slavery and Lincoln describes slavery as "done" and the Thirteenth Amendment as certain to be ratified. Lincoln also encourages Stephens to consider that if the Confederates let go of certain rights, "the freedom to oppress, for instance", that they may find other, more honorable rights would reveal themselves.

The conference is mentioned in Jeff Shaara's 1998 novel The Last Full Measure.

== See also ==
- Opposition to the American Civil War
- Grand Contraband Camp
- The Peacemakers

== Sources ==
- Conroy, James B. Our One Common Country: Abraham Lincoln and the Hampton Roads Peace Conference of 1865 (Guilford: Lyons, 2014). xxiv, 390 pp.
- Cox, LaWanda and John H. Cox. Politics, Principle, and Prejudice 1865–1866: Dilemma of Reconstruction America. London: Collier-Macmillan, 1963.
- Donald, David Herbert. Lincoln. London: Jonathan Cape, 1995. ISBN 978-1439126288
- Escott, Paul D. "What Shall We Do with the Negro?" Lincoln, White Racism, and Civil War America. University of Virginia Press, 2009. ISBN 9780813927862
- Harris, William C. (January 2000). "The Hampton Roads Peace Conference: A Final Test of Lincoln's Presidential Leadership". Journal of the Abraham Lincoln Association. 21 (1): 30–61. hdl:2027/spo.2629860.0021.104.
- Johnson, Ludwell H. "Fort Sumter and Confederate Diplomacy". Journal of Southern History, 26(4), November 1960, pp. 441–477; JSTOR 2204623
- Johnson, Ludwell H. "Lincoln's Solution to the Problem of Peace Terms, 1864-1865," Journal of Southern History (1968), 34(4), pp. 576–586 JSTOR 2204388
- Mann, Justine Staib. The Political and Constitutional Thought of John Archibald Campbell. Dissertation, University of Alabama, 1966. ProQuest 302166781.
- McPherson, James. Battle Cry of Freedom: The Civil War Era. Oxford University Press, 1988. ISBN 9780199743902
- McPherson, James. "No Peace without Victory, 1861-1865". American Historical Review 109(1), February 2004; pp. 1–18. JSTOR 10.1086/530149, 1 July 2013.
- Nicolay, J. G. and John Hay, "Abraham Lincoln: A History. The Hampton Roads Conference" The Century (Oct 1889) pp 846–852, by Lincoln's two secretaries online
- Nystrom, Justin A. "'What Shall We Do with the Narrative of American Progress?' Lincoln at 200 and National Mythology". Reviews in American History 38(1), March 2010; pp. 67–71. Accessed via Project Muse, 30 June 2013.
- Sanders, Charles W. Jr. "Jefferson Davis and the Hampton Roads Peace Conference: 'To secure Peace to the two countries'." Journal of Southern History (1997) 63#4, pp. 803–826. JSTOR 2211720
- Stahr, Walter. Seward: Lincoln's Indispensable Man. New York: Simon & Schuster, 2012. ISBN 978-1-4391-2116-0
- Vorenberg, Michael. "'The Deformed Child': Slavery and the Election of 1864". Civil War History 47(3), September 2001. Accessed via Project Muse, 29 June 2013.
- Vorenberg, Michael (2001). Final Freedom: The Civil War, the Abolition of Slavery, and the Thirteenth Amendment. Cambridge University Press. ISBN 9781139428002. Archived from the original on 2012-09-12 – via Questia.
