= Harris' Missouri Battery =

Harris' Missouri Battery may refer to:

- Harris' Missouri Battery (1862), a unit of the Confederate States Army active in 1862
- Harris' Missouri Battery (1864), a unit of the Confederate States Army active in 1864–1865
