= August House =

US-based children's book publisher

- Founded: 1978
- Founders: Ted Parkhurst; Jon Looney
- Country of origin: United States
- Headquarters location: Atlanta, Georgia
- Distribution: Simon & Schuster
- Key people: Steve Floyd, CEO; Graham Anthony, creative director
- Publication types: Books
- Nonfiction topics: Resource materials
- Fiction genres: Children's literature, folktale anthologies
- Imprints: Story Cove; LittleFolk
- Official website: www.augusthouse.com

August House is an independent children's book publisher established in 1978 and currently headquartered in Atlanta, Georgia. August House principally focuses on publishing children's folktales, picture books, early-grade chapter books, and storytelling resource materials. August House also manages two imprints: Story Cove, an interactive picture book and multimedia series geared towards helping teachers meet classroom Common Core Standards for reading, and LittleFolk, August House's picture book line.

August House is home to authors Margaret Read MacDonald, Donald Davis, Martha Hamilton, Mitch Weiss, Willy Claflin, Heather Forest, Rob Cleveland, W. C. Jameson, and Pleasant DeSpain, among others, as well as the award-winning picture-book series Maynard Moose.

== Origins ==
August House was founded in Little Rock, Arkansas by Ted Parkhurst and Jon Looney as a publisher of Arkansas poetry. In 1986, August House began to collaborate with Liz Parkhurst and W.K. McNeil and develop as a folklore publisher. By 1989, August House established a partnership with the National Storytelling Festival and began to regularly publish works by professional storytellers. The company was purchased in 2004 by Steve Floyd and Graham Anthony of Marsh Cove Productions, who expanded August House's LittleFolk picture book line, established the Story Cove imprint, and moved the headquarters to Atlanta, Georgia. Since then, the company has continued to build and expand its collection of folktales and stories from the oral tradition.

== Imprints ==
- Story Cove: publishes leveled picture books with supplemental video animations, read-along recordings, lesson plans, and activities to build reading skills needed to meet Common Core Standards.
- LittleFolk: publishes picture books by authors Margaret Read MacDonald, Martha Hamilton, Mitch Weiss, Heather Forest, and others. LittleFolk titles include illustrations from artists Susan Gaber, Julie Paschkis, James Stimson, Don Tate, Peter Thornton, Geraldo Valério, and others.

== Publications ==
Title	Author(s)	Illustrator	Year	ISBN
August House Book of Scary Stories	Assorted Authors	Tom Wrenn	2009	978-0-874839-15-9
Bully Goat Grim	Willy Claflin	James Stimson	2012	978-0-874839-52-4
Fat Cat	Margaret Read MacDonald	Julie Paschkis	2005	978-0-874837-65-0
Go to Sleep Gecko	Margaret Read MacDonald	Geraldo Valerio	2006	978-0-874837-80-3
How Tiger Got His Stripes	Rob Cleveland	Baird Hoffmire	2006	978-0-874837-99-5
Little Moose Who Couldn't Go to Sleep	Willy Claflin	James Stimson	2014	978-1-939160-67-6
Rapunzel and the Seven Dwarfs	Willy Claflin	James Stimson	2011	978-0-874839-14-2
Stone Soup	Heather Forest	Susan Gaber	2005	978-0-874836-02-8
Uglified Ducky	Willy Claflin	James Stimson	2011	978-0-874839-53-1
