= Gregory J. W. Urwin =

Professor of military history (born 1955)

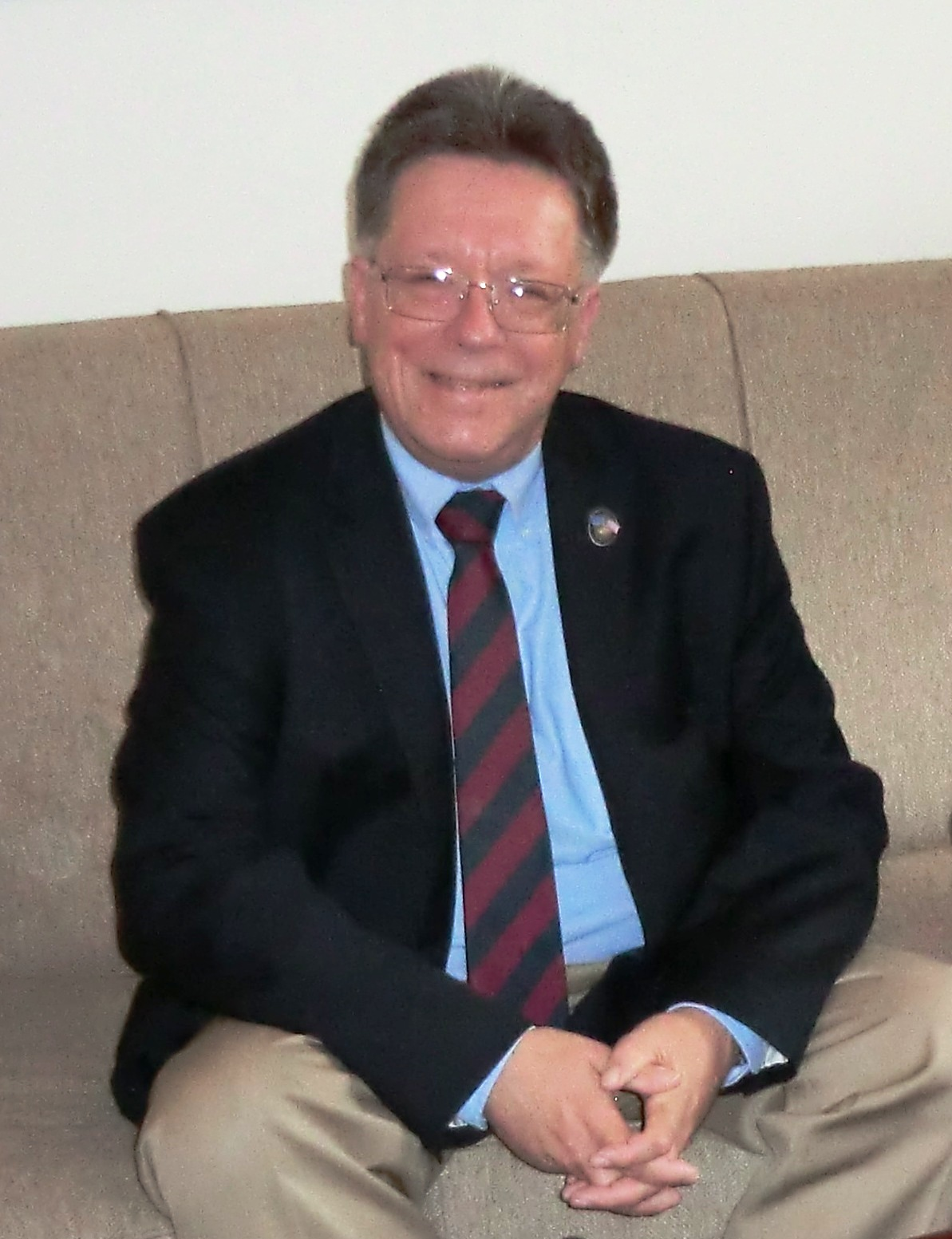
Professor Gregory Urwin

Gregory J. W. Urwin (born July 11, 1955) is a professor of military history at Temple University and the author of several books and articles. He has been at Temple University since 1999. His wife Cathy Kunzinger Urwin is also a professor and author. She wrote Agenda for Reform: Winthrop Rockefeller as Governor of Arkansas, 1967–1971, University of Arkansas Press, 1991. He is a contributing author to Encyclopædia Britannica. He received the General Wallace M. Greene Jr. Award from the Marine Corps Heritage Foundation and the Harold L. Peterson Award from the Eastern National Park and Monuments Association. He has appeared in documentaries and given public lectures.

He was born in Cleveland and graduated from Borromeo Seminary High School in 1973. He graduated summa cum laude from Borromeo College of Ohio in 1977, received a Master of Arts degree from John Carroll University in 1979, and earned a Master of Arts from the University of Notre Dame in 1981. He also received a Ph.D. from Notre Dame. He wrote his doctoral dissertation on “The Defenders on Wake Island".

Urwin taught at St. Mary of the Plains College in Dodge City, Kansas and the University of Central Arkansas before joining Temple University's history department.

== Bibliography ==
- Custer Victorious: The Civil War Battles of General George Armstrong Custer. Rutherford, Teaneck, and Madison, New Jersey, Fairleigh Dickinson University Press, 1983
- Facing Fearful Odds: The Siege of Wake Island, University of Nebraska Press, Lincoln, 1997; won the General Wallace M. Greene Jr. Award in 1998 from the Marine Corps Heritage Foundation
- History of the 33d Iowa Infantry Volunteer Regiment 1863–6. by A. F. Sperry, University of Arkansas Press, Fayetteville, 1999
- Black Flag over Dixie: Racial Atrocities and Reprisals in the Civil War, editor, Southern Illinois University Press, Carbondale, 2004
- Victory in Defeat: The Wake Island Defenders in Captivity, 1941–1945, Naval Institute Press, Annapolis, 2010.
- "Custer: The Civil War Years", in The Custer Reader edited by Paul A. Hutton, University of Nebraska Press, Lincoln 1992, pp. 7–32.
- "'We Cannot Treat Negroes ... as Prisoners of War’: Racial Atrocities and Reprisals in Civil War Arkansas”, Civil War History 42, September 1996, pp. 193–210, won the Harold L. Peterson Award in 1997 from the Eastern National Park and Monument Association
- Glory and Me: A History Professor's Short Love/Hate Affair with Hollywood,” North and South: The Official Magazine of the Civil War Society, 11, October 2009, pp. 49–57.
