= W. K. McNeil =

American historian (1940–2005)

- Born: William Kinneth McNeil; August 13, 1940; Canton, North Carolina, U.S.
- Died: April 19, 2005 (aged 64); Mountain View, Arkansas, U.S.
- Education: Carson–Newman College (BA); Oklahoma State University (MA); State University of New York (MA); Indiana University Bloomington (PhD)
- Occupations: Folklorist; historian; record producer; author

W.K. McNeil (August 13, 1940 in Canton, North Carolina – April 19, 2005 in Mountain View, Arkansas) was a prominent American folklorist, historian, record producer, and author specializing in Ozark and Appalachian mountain cultures.

== Life and career ==
W.K. McNeil was born William Kinneth McNeil on August 13, 1940, in Haywood County, North Carolina, located in the Appalachian Mountain region. He was known as "Bill" to his friends. He received his B.A. in history at Carson-Newman College in Jefferson City, Tennessee, in 1962, his M.A. in history from Oklahoma State University, an M.A. in American folk culture from the Cooperstown Graduate Program of the State University of New York in 1967, and his Ph.D. in folklore from Indiana University Bloomington in 1980. His dissertation was on the history of American folklore studies to 1908 and he published many biographical articles based on this work. He also became a founding member of the History and Folklore section of the American Folklore Society and advisory editor to its journal The Folklore Historian. He became known as a leading force in writing histories of folklore as a professional discipline. In 1975, he became administrator for the Regional America Program of the Smithsonian Institution's Festival of American Folklife, and in 1976 he took the job that he held for the remainder of his life as folklorist for the Ozark Folk Center in Mountain View, Arkansas. In the post, he organized public programming, disseminated research, and established an archives of traditional material. He held professional posts of president of the Mid-America Folklore Society in 1980, book review editor of the Journal of American Folklore from 1980 to 1993, and member of the executive board of the National Council for the Traditional Arts in 1979.

== Scholarship ==
He began issuing collections of regional folklore as books during the 1980s based on his own fieldwork and archival material. He received popular recognition for his work with the publication of Ghost Stories from the American South (1985), which became a mass market paperback. The subjects of his other books focused on the Ozarks and Appalachian Mountains as folk regions and folk songs and humor in the South, including Ozark Country (1995), Southern Folk Ballads (1987, 2 volumes), Southern Mountain Folksongs (1993), Appalachian Images in Folk and Popular Culture (1989, 2nd ed. 1995), Ozark Mountain Humor (1989). He was also involved in the study of gospel music, and edited a magazine devoted to it entitled Rejoice. A large editorial project that had occupied him for many years was issued after his death as the Encyclopedia of American Gospel Music (2005).

McNeil's analytical concern was to show, contrary to popular perceptions, that mountain folk cultures is complex and constantly evolving and adapting to new conditions rather than being stuck in the past. He linked the Ozarks to sources in Appalachian culture but also showed multiple influences that made the Ozarks distinct as a cultural region.

== Books ==
- 1985. Ghost Stories from the American South. New York: Dell.
- 1987. Southern Folk Ballads, 2 vols. Little Rock: August House.
- 1989. Ozark Mountain Humor. Little Rock: August House.
- 1993. Southern Mountain Folksongs: Traditional Songs from the Appalachians and the Ozarks. Little Rock: August House.
- 1995. Appalachian Images in Folk and Popular Culture. Knoxville: University of Tennessee Press.
- 2005. Encyclopedia of American Gospel Music. New York: Routledge.

== Recordings ==
- 1981. Not Far from Here: Traditional Narratives and Songs Collected in the Arkansas Ozarks. Mountain View, Arkansas: Ozark Folk Center.
- 1985. How Firm a Foundation: Favorite Religious Songs of Almeda Riddle. LP Record. Mountain View, Arkansas: Arkansas Traditions.
- 1993. The Blues: A Smithsonian Collection of Classic Blues Singers. Book and 4 CDs. Washington, D.C.: Smithsonian Institution Press.
