= Harris's Missouri Battery (1864) =

Artillery battery in the Confederate States Army

Harris's Battery 4th Missouri Field Battery
- Active: Early 1864 – May 26, 1865
- Allegiance: Confederate States of America
- Branch: Confederate States Army
- Type: Artillery
- Equipment: 4 × 6-pounder smoothbore cannons
- Engagements: American Civil War: Battle of Prairie D'Ane; Battle of Poison Spring; Battle of Ditch Bayou; Battle of Pilot Knob; Battle of Glasgow; Battle of Little Blue River; Battle of the Big Blue River; Battle of Mine Creek

Harris's Missouri Battery (officially known as the 4th Missouri Field Battery) was an artillery battery that served in the Confederate States Army during the American Civil War. The battery was organized in early 1864 when the 13th Missouri Light Battery was reorganized in a process that may not have been officially approved; Captain Samuel Stanhope Harris commanded the new unit. The battery fought in the Camden Expedition in early 1864, seeing action in the Battle of Prairie D'Ane and the Battle of Poison Spring in April. In June, the battery was present at the Battle of Ditch Bayou. Harris's Battery accompanied Sterling Price during his raid into Missouri in late 1864, during which it fought at the battles of Pilot Knob, Glasgow, Little Blue River, Big Blue River, and Mine Creek, as well as several smaller skirmishes. At Mine Creek, the battery's cannons were captured. On May 26, 1865, the battery surrendered; the men of the battery were paroled.

== Service history ==
=== Organization and the Camden Expedition ===
The origins of Harris's Battery date to early 1864, when the 13th Missouri Light Battery underwent a reorganization that may not have been officially sanctioned. Captain Daniel B. Griswold was replaced as commander of the battery by Captain Samuel Stanhope Harris when the battery was reorganized; the reasons for the change in command are unknown. General Edmund Kirby Smith, commander of the department in which the battery served, questioned the change in command and reorganization, but Harris retained command of the battery. (Note: Harris had previously commanded a battery known as Harris's Missouri Battery in 1862; that battery was never officially issued cannons and became part of the 6th Missouri Infantry Regiment (Confederate).) After the reorganization, the battery served in the brigade of Brigadier General John S. Marmaduke and was armed with four 6-pounder smoothbore cannons.

When Major General Frederick Steele of the Union Army began the Camden Expedition in the spring of 1864 to support the Red River Campaign, Harris's Battery was part of the Confederate force sent to confront Steele. On April 10, during the Battle of Prairie D'Ane, Harris's Battery, along with Collins' Missouri Battery, participated in an artillery duel with three Union batteries: the Springfield Illinois Light Artillery, Battery E, 2nd Missouri Light Artillery, and Voegele's Wisconsin Battery. The firefight began around 5:00 p.m. and continued until after sunset. The Confederate artillery fire was not very effective, as the Confederate cannons were of "old and inferior pattern" according to historian Michael J. Forsyth. On April 15, the battery was involved in a skirmish near Gallups; it next fought at the Battle of Poison Spring on the 18th. At Poison Spring, Harris's Battery was part of the brigade of Colonel Colton Greene. The battery was position on the right flank on the Confederate line and provided artillery support for a Confederate charge against a Union wagon train.

On April 29, the battery accompanied Greene's brigade as it harassed Steele's retreating column, and saw some fighting. However, the battery was not engaged at the Battle of Jenkins' Ferry on the 30th. During June 1864, the battery operated against Union Navy vessels serving on the Mississippi River and inflicted damage on several gunboats and transports. On June 6, the battery was present at the Battle of Ditch Bayou, where it guarded Lake Village, Arkansas.

=== Price's Raid ===
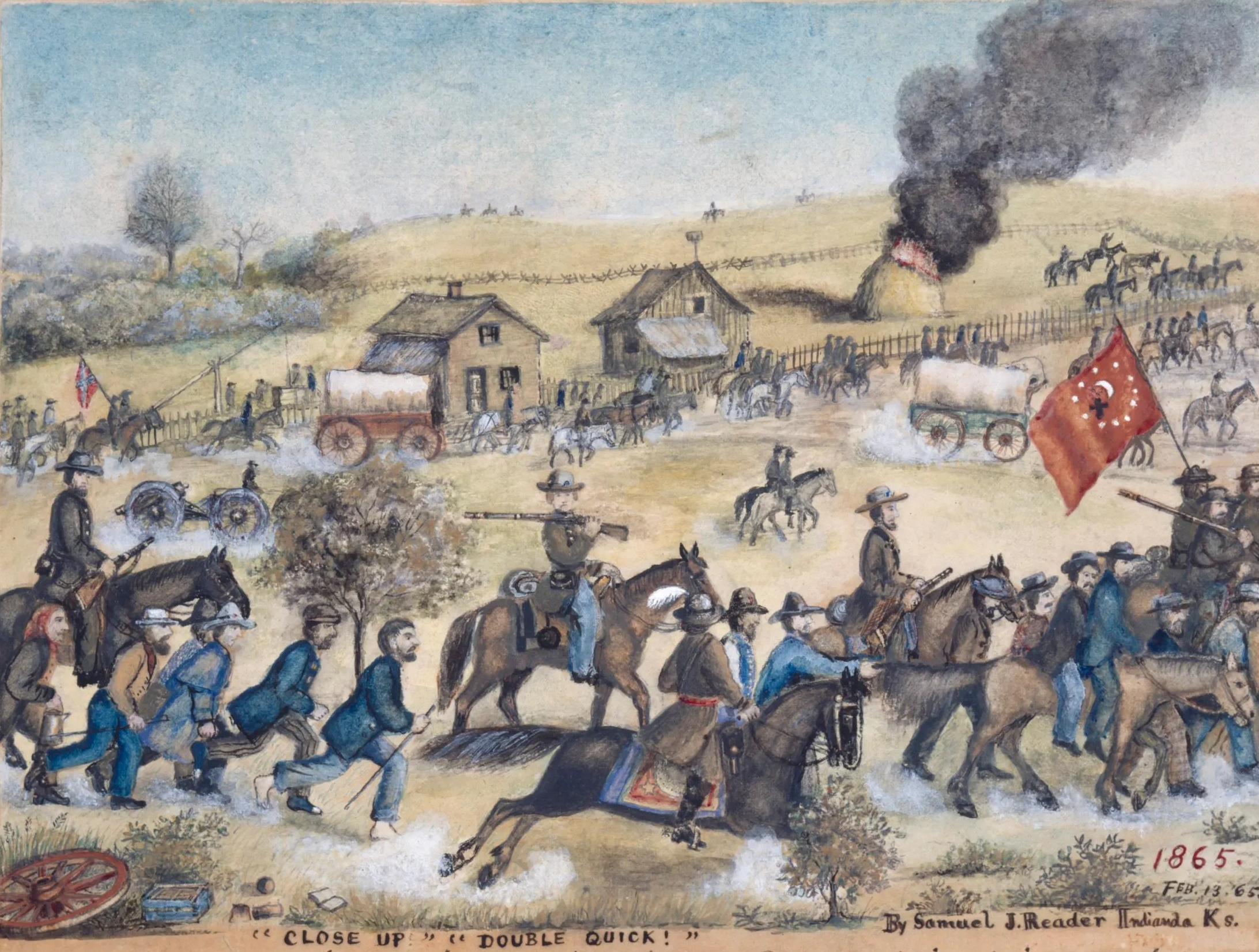
Price's Missouri Raid in October 1864

The battery accompanied Major General Sterling Price during his raid into Missouri in late 1864. During the campaign, the battery only had three cannons, (Note: The battery was reported to have four at the Battle of Mine Creek on October 25.) and was commanded by Lieutenant Thomas J. Williams. On September 27, at the Battle of Pilot Knob, Harris's Battery fired the opening shots of the fight, but was quickly silenced by Union counter-battery fire. The battery then participated in small fights at Union, Missouri on October 1, and at California, Missouri on October 9. On October 15, during the Battle of Glasgow, the battery participated in shelling the Union garrison. On October 21, the battery helped repulse a Union attack at the Battle of Little Blue River, and it also saw action at the Battle of the Big Blue River on October 23. On October 25, at the Battle of Mine Creek, Harris's Battery was positioned near the center of the Confederate line. A Union cavalry charge hit the Confederate line near where Harris's Battery was positioned, and the battery was left isolated. Two of the battery's cannons were captured as a result; although two were dragged some distance. However, even those two cannons were later captured. The battery suffered 35 casualties at Mine Creek.

After the end of Price's Raid, the battery was transferred to Grand Ecore, Louisiana, where it was used to operate heavy artillery guarding the Red River. On November 19, the battery was officially designated the 4th Missouri Field Battery by Smith, although the moniker of Harris's Battery was still used to refer to the unit. On May 26, 1865, the battery surrendered; the men of the battery were paroled. When the paroles were issued, there were found to be 136 men in the battery. Historian James McGhee has speculated that many of the men were recruited during Price's Raid.

== See also ==
- List of Missouri Confederate Civil War units

== General sources ==
- Buresh, Lumir F. (1977). October 25 and the Battle of Mine Creek. Kansas City, Missouri: The Lowell Press. ISBN 0-913504-40-8.
- Collins, Charles D. Jr. (2016). Battlefield Atlas of Price's Missouri Expedition of 1864 (PDF). Fort Leavenworth, Kansas: Combat Studies Institute Press. ISBN 978-1-940804-27-9.
- Forsyth, Michael J. (2003). The Camden Expedition of 1864. Jefferson, North Carolina: McFarland & Company, Inc. ISBN 0-7864-1554-1.
- McGhee, James E. (2008). Guide to Missouri Confederate Regiments, 1861–1865. Fayetteville, Arkansas: University of Arkansas Press. ISBN 978-1-55728-870-7.
- The War of the Rebellion: A Compilation of the Official Records of the Union and Confederate Armies. Vol. 34. Washington, D.C.: United States Government Printing Office. 1891. OCLC 262466842.
- The War of the Rebellion: A Compilation of the Official Records of the Union and Confederate Armies. Vol. 41. Washington, D.C.: United States Government Printing Office. 1893. OCLC 262466842.
