= LaWanda Cox =

American historian

LaWanda Fenlason Cox (1909–2005) was a pioneering historian of the American Civil War and the period of Reconstruction. Cox was born on September 24, 1909, in Aberdeen, Washington. She attended Washington High School in Portland, Oregon. Later, she received her Bachelors at the University of Oregon in 1931, her masters from Smith College (1934) and her Ph.D. from the University of California, Berkeley in 1941. Cox studied at Smith College with Merle Curti a social historian, and at Berkeley with John Schuster Taylor an economist. She was a member of the history faculty at Hunter College and the City University of New York's Graduate Center (and briefly, at Goucher College) from 1940, until her retirement from teaching in 1971. She remained an active historian until the loss of her sight, in 1989; she died on February 2, 2005, in New York City.

== Career ==
She was the author of several major works, including Politics, Principle, and Prejudice 1865-1866: Dilemma of Reconstruction America (1963), which she wrote with her husband, John H. Cox; both shared the 1964 Dunning Prize for this work. She also wrote, on her own, Reconstruction: The Negro, and the New South (1973) and Lincoln and Black Freedom: A Study of Presidential Leadership (1981).

== Bibliography ==
- Cox, LaWanda. Lincoln and Black Freedom: A Study in Presidential Leadership. Columbia: University of South Carolina Press, 1981.
- Cox, LaWanda, and John H. Politics, Principle, and Prejudice 1865-1866: Dilemma of Reconstruction America. New York: Free Press, 1963.
- Cox, LaWanda. Reconstruction: The Negro, and the New South. Columbia: University of South Carolina Press, 1973.
