= Pleasant DeSpain =

American storyteller and author (born 1943)

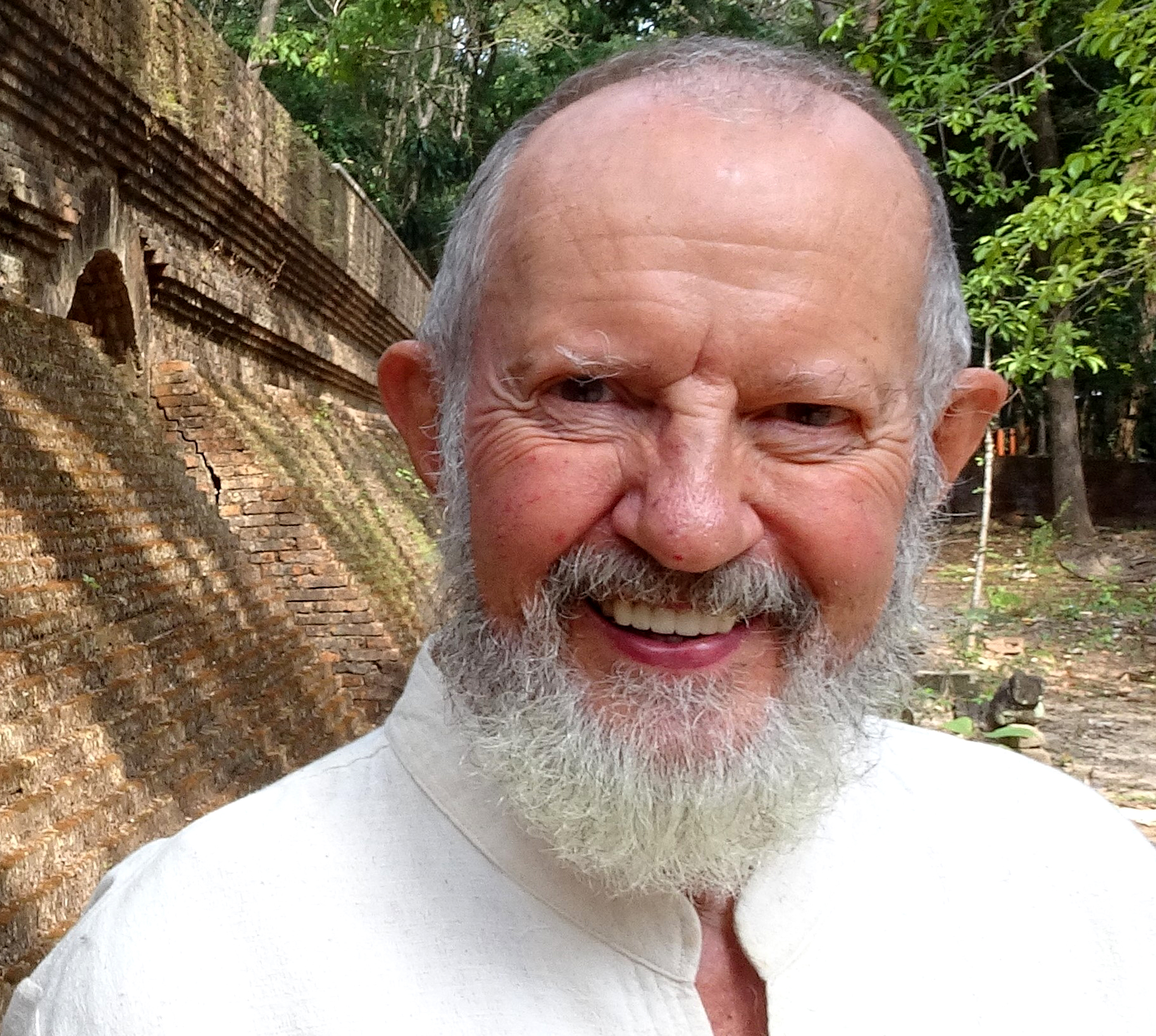
- Pleasant at a Buddhist temple in Chiang Mai, Thailand
- Born: 1943 (age 82–83); Denver, Colorado
- Education: Southern Illinois University (B.A., M.A.)
- Occupations: Storyteller, oral storyteller, author
- Writing career
- Language: English
- Years active: 1972 to present day
- Genres: Live performance, books, picture books, YA and children's books
- Subjects: Multicultural collections of traditional and true tales, spiritual help
- Notable awards: Best Children’s Books of the Year, Selected Outstanding by the Parent Council, Selected for the Elementary School Library Collection. PLA/ALLS Best New Books for New Adult Readers
- Website: www.pleasant-despain.com

Pleasant DeSpain (born in 1943) is an international storyteller, world traveler, and author of multicultural story collections and picture books, many of which are used in elementary schools and libraries as multicultural teaching aids. He has performed in more than 3,000 schools, theaters, conventions, libraries, and churches in America, Canada, Mexico, Thailand, Southeast Asia, and Central America.

DeSpain has also been a featured storyteller at festivals across the US, including the National Storytelling Festival in Jonesborough, Tennessee, Tucson's Tales of Arizona Festival, and Louisville's Corn Island Storytelling Festival where he performed for 16,000 people. Jimmy Neil Smith, the founder of the National Storytelling Festival (and the National Association for the Preservation and Perpetuation, which would later become the International Storytelling Center), refers to DeSpain as “a pioneer of the American renaissance in storytelling.”

After visiting 36 countries, DeSpain chose Thailand – "the land of smiles" – as his home base in 2017.

== Early life ==
DeSpain was born in Denver, Colorado, the second son of Robert Alan and Eleanor Jane DeSpain. Early in his childhood, he learned to read and fell in love with books. "I wrote my first story in third grade. It was called 'The Mystery Artist.' I got in trouble because it was getting passed around the classroom... The teacher said, 'The story is good, but your spelling is terrible.'". Forty-five years later it was published in 1996 and sold more than 200,000 copies.

== Education and teaching ==
In 1961–1963 DeSpain attended Adams State College in Alamosa, Colorado. In 1965 he graduated from Southern Illinois University in Carbondale with a Bachelor of Arts in English and Public Speaking, continued his studies there, and earned a master's degree in Rhetoric and Public Address and the Oral Interpretation of Literature in 1966.

In 1966 DeSpain started his educational career as a Speech Communication and Oral Literature instructor at the University of Massachusetts in Amherst. In 1968 he was granted a fellowship to study for a Ph.D. at the University of Colorado, Boulder. After two years of studying and teaching in Colorado, he left the doctorate program to begin his world travels. Nine months later, the University of Washington in Seattle invited DeSpain to become one of their faculty members.

== Multicultural storytelling career ==
While sitting on a beach in Mexico at age 25, DeSpain decided that storytelling would be his life's work. "I came within six months of getting my Ph.D.," he says. "Thank God I didn't. I had a dark night of the soul." The road to success was not easy or quick. Pleasant worked as a house painter, short-order cook and dishwasher during the first five years as he followed his muse, but his trials were rewarded. "Storytelling, an art form as old as the human race, was being revived elsewhere around the country too. 'Twelve others were coming up with the same idea,' he remembers. 'We started hearing about each other and began to meet.'"

In addition to oral storytelling at local venues, he wrote a weekly column featuring a wide range of stories for The Seattle Times. In 1975 he created Pleasant Journeys, a weekly storytelling television show for children, which aired on the NBC Seattle affiliate (KING TV), and was named “Seattle’s Resident Storyteller” by the city's mayor. DeSpain wrote, produced, and hosted the show for five years until 1980.

During his storytelling career, DeSpain has traveled and performed them along the way for audiences.

Audiences are an essential component in his art, and DeSpain says, “Three elements – story, listener, teller – must come together as one during the experience.” In all of his stories, DeSpain delivers one central message: “My main force in the telling and the writing is to point out in an entertaining way that we human beings are far more alike than we are different, no matter the culture, the time, the language, or the religion.” DeSpain is also enthusiastic about sharing the art of storytelling, and often follows up his school performances by teaching children how to tell their own stories. “What I love about storytelling as a career is that every one of us is a natural-born teller of tales. Our lives are our stories and when we share our stories, we share our lives."

== Works ==
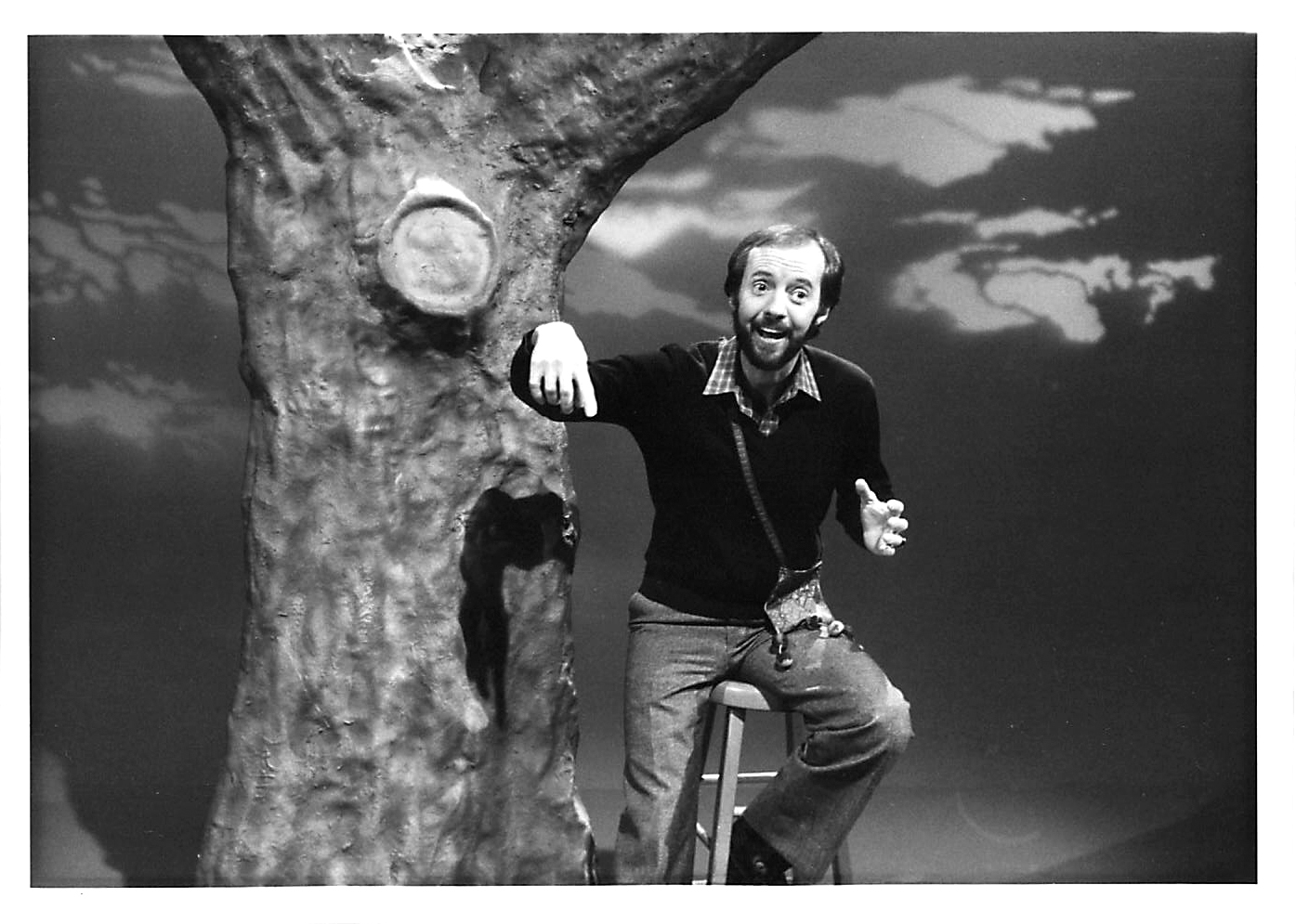
DeSpain on the set of his storytelling television show "Pleasant Journeys" on KING-TV in Seattle during the 1970s

=== Folklore collections ===
- Pleasant Journeys, Twenty-Two Tales from Around the World, Vols. 1 & 2 (illus. Kirk Lytle) 1979.
- Thirty-Three Multicultural Tales to Tell (illus. Joe Shlichta) 1993, ISBN 0-87483-266-7.
- Twenty-Two Splendid Tales to Tell from Around the World, Vols. 1 & 2, (illus. Kirk Lytle) 1994, ISBN 978-0874834178, ISBN 978-0874834178.
- Eleven Turtle Tales, (illus. Joe Shlichta) 1995. ISBN 0-87483-266-7.
- Eleven Nature Tales, (illus. Joe Shlichta) 1996, ISBN 0-87483-458-9.
- Sweet Land of Story, Thirty-Six American Tales to Tell, (illus. Don Bell) 1998, ISBN 0-87483-569-0.
- The Emerald Lizard, Fifteen Latin American Tales to Tell, in English & Spanish, translated by Mario Lamo-Jimenez. (illus. Don Bell) 1999, ISBN 978-0874834178.
- The Books of Nine Lives Series, (illus. Don Bell) 2005.
  - Tales of Tricksters, Vol. 1, ISBN 0-87483-669-7.
  - Tales of Heroes, Vol. 2, ISBN 0-87483-666-2.
  - Tales of Wisdom and Justice, Vol. 3, ISBN 0-87483-671-9.
  - Tales of Nonsense and Tomfoolery, Vol. 4, ISBN 0-87483-569-0
  - Tales of Holidays, Vol. 5, ISBN 0-87483-667-0.
  - Tales of Insects, Vol. 6, ISBN 0-87483-668-9.
  - Tales of Enchantment, Vol. 7, ISBN 0-87483-711-1.
  - Tales to Frighten and Delight, Vol. 8, ISBN 0-87483-712-X
  - Tales of Cats, Vol. 9, ISBN 0-87483-713-8

=== Picture books ===
- The Mystery Artist, (illus. Mel Crawford) 1996.
- Strongheart Jack and the Beanstalk, (illus. Joe Shlichta) 1997, ISBN 0-87483-414-7.
- The Dancing Turtle, a Tale from Brazil, (illus. David Boston) 2005, ISBN 0-87483-502-X.
- The Magic Pot, a Tale from China, (illus. Tom Wrenn) 2007, ISBN 0-87483-827-4.

== Book awards ==
The Dancing Turtle

- Bank Street College: Best Children's Books of the Year, 2005.
- Selected Outstanding by the Parent Council, 2005.
- Selected for the Elementary School Library Collection, 2005.

Eleven Nature Tales

- PLA/ALLS Best New Books for New Adult Readers, 1996.
- Selected for the Elementary School Library Collection, 1996.

Eleven Turtle Tales

- Selected as Outstanding by the Parent Council, 1995.

The Emerald Lizard

- NCSS/CBC: Notable Children's Trade Book in the Field of Social Studies, 1999.
- Bank Street College: Best Children's Book of the Year, 1999.
- Selected for the Elementary School Library Collection, 1999.
- Parent’s Guide to Children’s Media: Young Adult's Choice Award, 1999.

Strongheart Jack and the Beanstalk

- Selected for The Elementary School Library Collection, 1997.

Sweet Land of Story

- NCSS/CBC: Notable Children's Trade Book in the Field of Social Studies, 1998.

== Printed Resources ==
- “Grabbing Life by the Tale: Troy’s Pleasant DeSpain has made a career telling stories”
  - Published in the Times Union newspaper, Sunday, August 31, 2003.
  - Included in Artists & Activists, Making Culture in New York’s Capital Region, by Joseph Dalton, TBM Books, Troy, NY, 2008.
- The Storyteller’s Journey: An American Revival, by Joseph Daniel Sobol. University of Illinois Press, 1999. (Acknowledgements).
- "Godfather Death, A Russian Tale," The Seattle Times, December 8, 1979.
- "Old One-eye, a folktale," The Seattle Times, May 31, 1980.

== See also ==
- Storytelling Festival
