= Ludwell H. Johnson =

American historian (1927–2017)

- Born: Ludwell Harrison Johnson III; March 30, 1927; Charleston, West Virginia, U.S.
- Died: June 5, 2017 (aged 90); Williamsburg, Virginia, U.S.
- Education: Johns Hopkins University (PhD)
- Occupation: Historian

Ludwell Harrison Johnson III (March 30, 1927 – June 5, 2017) was a professor of history at the College of William & Mary. His main expertise was the American Civil War, with a focus on the political and economic motives of those who sought independence in the form of a Southern confederacy.

== Biography ==
Johnson was born in 1927 in Charleston, West Virginia. He was raised in Richmond, Virginia. He served in the Naval Reserve from 1945 to 1946 and received his Ph.D. from Johns Hopkins University in 1955. In November, 1996, Johnson was diagnosed with a rare form of bone cancer. Johnson died on June 5, 2017, in Williamsburg, Virginia, at the age of 90.

== Selected works ==
- Red River Campaign: Politics and Cotton in the Civil War (1958)
- Division and Reunion: America, 1848–1877 (1978)
