= Joseph Bloomfield Leake =

American politician (1828–1913)

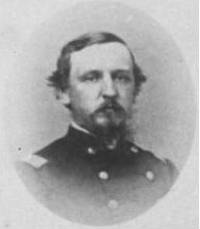
- Born: April 1, 1828; Deerfield Township, New Jersey, US
- Died: June 8, 1913 (aged 85); Chicago, Illinois, US
- Burial place: Oakdale Memorial Gardens; Davenport, Iowa, US
- Military career
- Allegiance: United States of America; Union
- Branch: United States Army; Union Army
- Service years: 1861–1865
- Rank: Lieutenant Colonel; Brevet Brigadier General
- Unit: 20th Iowa Infantry Regiment
- Conflicts: American Civil War: Battle of Prairie Grove; Siege of Vicksburg; Siege of Port Hudson; Battle of Stirling's Plantation (POW)
- Other work: U.S. District Attorney for the Northern District of Illinois

Joseph Bloomfield Leake (April 1, 1828 – June 8, 1913) was an American attorney and an Iowa State Senator who entered the Union Army during the Civil War. He became a Brevet Brigadier General before the war was over. After the war, he became the United States Attorney for the Northern District of Illinois in Chicago.

== Biography ==
=== Early life and career ===
Leake was born in Deerfield Township, New Jersey, and later moved to Cincinnati, Ohio. He graduated from Miami University in 1846 and then studied law. He was admitted to the bar in 1850 and set up a practice in Davenport, Iowa. Leake was elected to the Iowa House of Representatives on the Republican ticket and served during the war session of 1861. The following year, he was elected to the Iowa Senate.

=== Military service ===
Leake resigned his seat in the state senate and became a captain of Company G of the 20th Iowa Infantry. He was commissioned a Lieutenant Colonel when the regiment was organized at Camp Kirkwood in Clinton, Iowa. He led the regiment at Prairie Grove, Vicksburg, Yazoo City, and Port Hudson. On September 29, 1863, in an engagement called the Battle of Stirling's Plantation near Morganza, Louisiana Leake was injured and captured by the Confederates. He was held prisoner at Camp Ford near Tyler, Texas. He was the highest-ranking Union officer in the camp, and he looked after the needs of the other Union POWs.

He was released from Camp Ford in a prisoner exchange in July 1864. Some of the soldiers from the 19th Iowa Infantry presented Leake with a new sword to replace the one he lost when he was taken prisoner. He returned to his regiment and participated in the capture of Fort Gaines and Fort Morgan near Mobile, Alabama. On March 13, 1865, he was awarded the rank of brevet brigadier general. The following month Leake led his regiment during the Battle of Fort Blakeley in Alabama.

=== Later life and death ===
After the war, Leake returned to Davenport and was re-elected to the Iowa Senate. He moved to Chicago in 1871 and was appointed the U.S. Attorney for the Northern District of Illinois. On September 21, 1887, he was elected the attorney for the Chicago Board of Education. He was a member of the Ulysses S. Grant Post #28 of the Grand Army of the Republic and served as State Commander of the Military Order of the Loyal Legion of the United States from 1894 to 1895.

Leake was married twice. His first wife was Cordellia Scott and he married his second wife, Mary P. Hill, on December 9, 1865. He had no children. Leake died in Chicago on June 8, 1913, and was buried in Oakdale Cemetery in Davenport.

== See also ==
- List of American Civil War brevet generals (Union)
