= Borden House =

Borden House may refer to:

- Borden House (Prairie Grove, Arkansas), listed on the NRHP in Washington County, Arkansas
- Borden-Winslow House, Fall River, Massachusetts, listed on the NRHP in Massachusetts
- Ariadne J. and Mary A. Borden House, Fall River, Massachusetts, listed on the NRHP in Massachusetts
- Borden-Pond House, Worcester, Massachusetts, listed on the NRHP in Massachusetts

== See also ==
- Lizzie Borden House
- Borden Farm (disambiguation)
