= 19th Iowa Infantry Regiment =

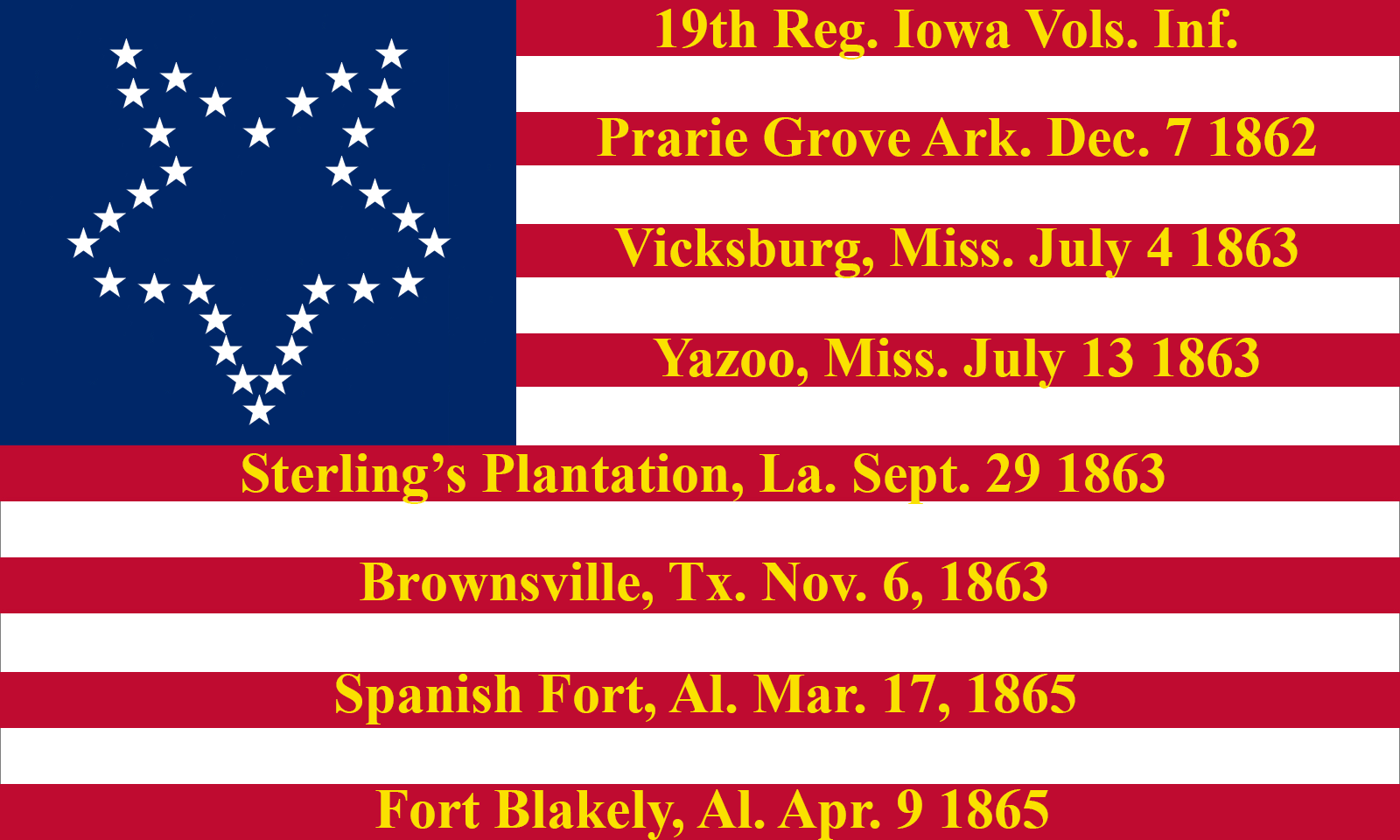
- 19th Iowa Battle Flag
- Active: August 25, 1862, to July 10, 1865
- Country: United States
- Allegiance: Union
- Branch: Infantry
- Engagements: Battle of Prairie Grove; Siege of Vicksburg; Battle of Brownsville; Battle of Stirling's Plantation; Battle of Spanish Fort; Battle of Fort Blakeley

The 19th Iowa Infantry Regiment was an infantry regiment that served in the Union Army during the American Civil War.

== Service ==
The 19th Iowa Infantry was organized at Keokuk, Iowa and mustered in for three years of Federal service on August 25, 1862. It was the second Iowa regiment to fully muster for active service.

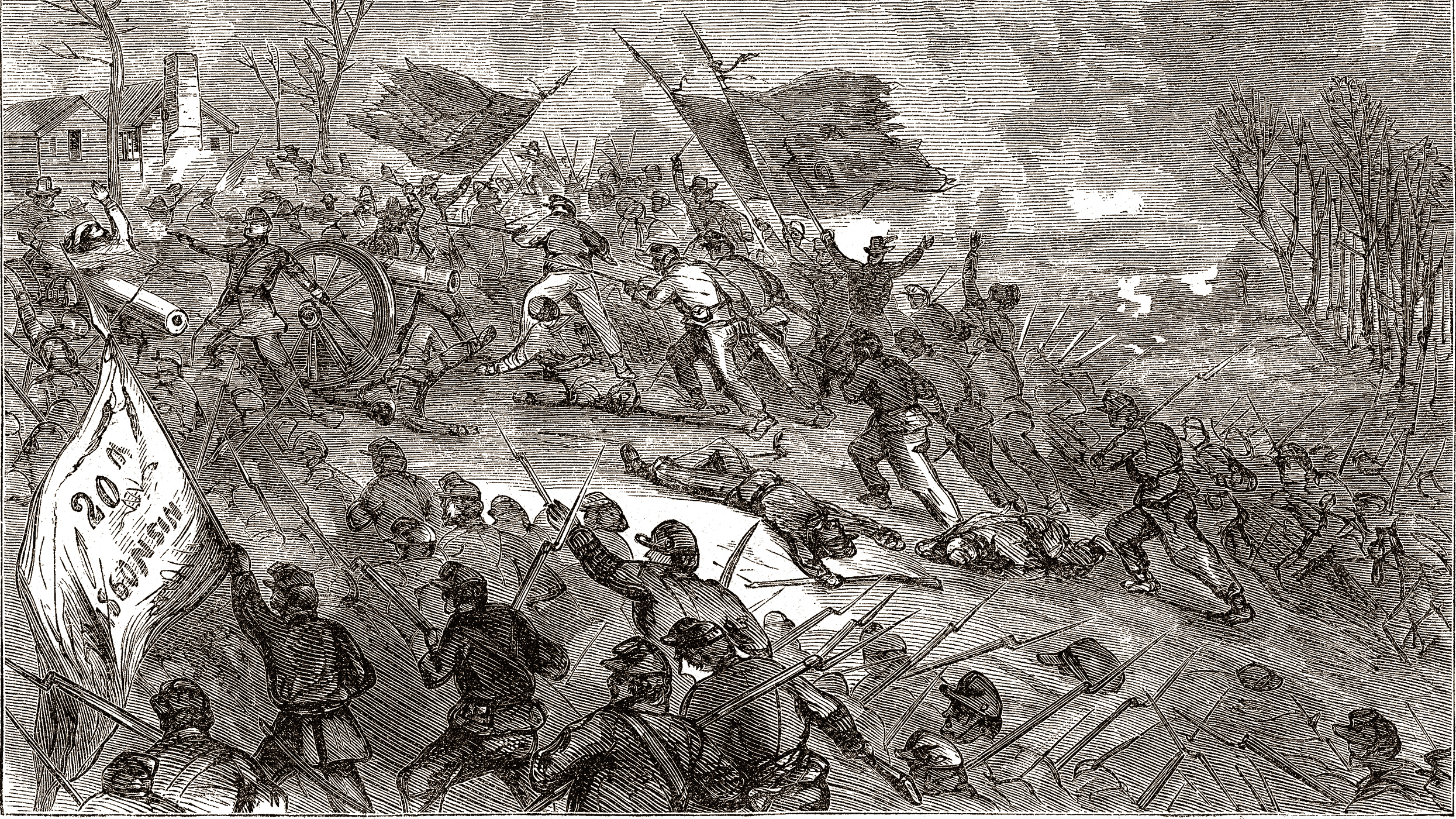
The 19th Iowa and 20th Wisconsin charge a Confederate battery during the Battle of Prairie Grove.

The 19th Iowa was assigned to Orme's Brigade, Heron's Division, Army of the Frontier. After completing a rigorous 35 mile march on December 6, 1862, the regiment prepared for battle. By this time, Lieutenant Colonel Samuel McFarland had taken command of the regiment. The next day was the Battle of Prairie Grove. Herron's Division deployed on the left side of the Union line, on a slight ridge facing south. In front of them was positioned a Confederate battery. General Herron ordered the 20th Wisconsin Infantry Regiment and the 19th Iowa Infantry forward to capture the guns. The two regiments gallantly charged, and captured the confederate battery. However, General Herron had vastly underestimated the amount of Confederates in the area. The two regiments, numbering some 500 men each, fought back numerous countercharges from half a dozen Confederate regiments. Eventually, overpowered and running low on supplies, the two regiments withdrew back to Union lines. The rebels then rallied and mounted their own assault, however they were beaten back savagely by the skilled gunnery of the 1st Missouri Battery E and the 1st Missouri Battery L. The regiment lost a total of 45 Killed, 143 Wounded, and 2 Captured, for a total of 200 Casualties, nearly a 40% casualty rate. Among the dead was Lt Colonel Samuel McFarland, killed leading the assault on the confederate battery.

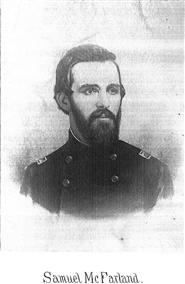
Lieutenant Colonel Samuel McFarland, Killed In Action at the head of the 19th Iowa Volunteers during the Battle of Prairie Grove

The 19th Iowa went on to fight in the Siege of Vicksburg, where it suffered only one man wounded during the siege. The regiment was deployed to the far right of Heron's Division, and its position is marked today by a monument in the Vicksburg National Military Park.

Much of the regiment was captured at the Battle of Sterling's Plantation. At Sterling's Plantation, the Regiment had been cut off from surrounding friendly units, but held their position on a levee overlooking the oncoming rebels. The 19th Iowa, now being commanded by Major John Bruce, and the 26th Indiana Infantry Regiment were tasked with holding the line. These two regiments numbered less than 500, and were trying to hold their ground against rebels that outnumbered them 3:1. Colonel John Leake, commanding the Union forces at Sterling's Plantation, was seriously wounded in the fighting. Leaderless, flanked, tired, and outnumbered 3:1, the Union forces surrendered piecemeal. Though some companies escaped, most of the regiment was captured. Much of the regiment was paroled in early 1864.

The remaining members took part in Banks' Army of the Gulf's South Texas Expedition where they fought at the Battle of Brownsville in Duye's 2nd Brigade in the 2nd Division of Dana's XIII Corps. (Note: Dana commanded both XIII Corps and its 2nd Division.)

The regiment closed out the war with the Battle of Spanish Fort and the Battle of Fort Blakeley, where it was noted for its gallant actions.

The regiment was mustered out on July 10, 1865.

== Total strength and casualties ==
The 19th Iowa mustered 1132 men at one time or another during its existence. It suffered 6 officers and 86 enlisted men who were killed in action or who died of their wounds and 2 officers and 98 enlisted men who died of disease, for a total of 192 fatalities.

== Commanders ==
- Colonel Benjamin Crabb
- Lieutenant Colonel Samuel McFarland (Killed in Action)
- Lieutenant Colonel Daniel Kent
- Lieutenant Colonel John Bruce
- Regimental Chaplain John Sands

== See also ==
- List of Iowa Civil War Units
- Iowa in the American Civil War
