= 20th Iowa Infantry Regiment =

- Iowa state flag
- Active: August 25, 1862, to July 8, 1865
- Country: United States
- Allegiance: Union
- Branch: Infantry
- Equipment: .577 cal. Enfield Rifles
- Engagements: Battle of Prairie Grove; Siege of Vicksburg; Battle of Stirling's Plantation; Battle of Brownsville; Battle of Mustang Island; Fort Morgan

The 20th Iowa Infantry Regiment was an infantry regiment that served in the Union Army during the American Civil War.

== Service ==
The 20th Iowa Infantry was organized at Clinton, Iowa and mustered in for three years of Federal service on August 25, 1862. The 20th Infantry moved to St. Louis, Mo., September 5; thence to Springfield, Mo., arriving September 24. They were attached to the following units over the course of their service:

- 2nd Brigade, 2nd Division, Army of the Frontier, Dept. of Missouri, to June, 1863.
- 1st Brigade, Herron's Division, 13th Army Corps, Dept. of Tennessee, to July, 1863.
- 1st Brigade, 2nd Division, 13th Army Corps, Dept. of Tennessee, to August, 1863, and Dept. of the Gulf to October, 1863. (Note: On this expedition, Maj. Gen. Dana commanded both XIII Corps and its 2nd Division.)
- 2nd Brigade, 2nd Division, 13th Corps, Dept. of the Gulf, to January, 1864.
- 2nd Brigade, 4th Division, 13th Corps, to February, 1864.
- 2nd Brigade, 2nd Division, 13th Corps, to June, 1864.
- 1st Brigade, United States Forces, Texas, Dept. of the Gulf, to August, 1864.
- United States Forces, Mobile Bay, Dept. of the Gulf, to September, 1864.
- 1st Brigade, 3rd Division, 19th Corps, Dept. of the Gulf, to December, 1864.
- 4th Brigade, Reserve Corps, Military Division West Mississippi, to February, 1865.
- 3rd Brigade, 2nd Division, Reserve Corps, February, 1865.
- 3rd Brigade, 2nd Division, 13th Army Corps, Military Division West Mississippi, to July, 1865.

The 20th took part in the following movements, actions, and engagements:

- Schofield's Campaign in Southwest Missouri October, 1862 to January, 1863.
- Occupation of Newtonia October 4.
- Battle of Prairie Grove, Ark., December 7.
- March over Boston Mountains to Van Buren, Ark., December 27–31.
- March to Huntsville, Ark., January 2–18, 1863, to Elk Creek January 22-February 15, and to St. Louis, arriving April 24.
- Guard Arsenal until May 15. (Cos. "A" and "F" at Defense of Cape Girardeau.)
- At Pilot Knob until June 3.
- Moved to St. Genevieve June 3, and to Vicksburg, Miss., June 6–14.
- Siege of Vicksburg June 14-July 4.
- Expedition to Yazoo City July 12–22.
- Capture of Yazoo City July 14.
- Moved to Port Hudson July 24 and to Carrollton, La., August 16.
- Expedition to Morganza, September 5–12.
- Atchafalaya River September 9–10.
- Sterlings Plantation September 29.
- At Morganza until October 10, then moved to Carrollton.
- Expedition to Rio Grande, Texas, October 27-December 2.
- Brazos, Santiago, November 4.
- Point Isabel November 6.
- Duty at Brownsville, Point Isabel and Mustang Island until June 24, 1864.
- Moved to Brazos Santiago, thence to Brownsville, and duty there until August 2.
- Moved to New Orleans, thence to Mobile Bay August 2–7.
- Siege of Fort Morgan August 9–23. Capture of Fort Morgan September 23.
- Moved to Morganza September 7–12, thence to Duvet's Bluff, Ark., October 12, and duty there and at Brownsville until January, 1865.
- Moved to New Orleans January 28, thence to Barrancas, Fla., February 17.
- Campaign against Mobile and its Defenses March and April.
- Steele's march from Pensacola, Fla., to Blakely, Ala., March 20-April 2.
- Occupation of Canoe Station March 27.
- Siege of Fort Blakely April 2–9. Assault and capture of Fort Blakely April 9.
- Moved to Mobile April 14, and duty there until July.

The regiment was mustered out on July 8, 1865.

== Total strength and casualties ==
The 20th Iowa mustered 1026 men at one time or another during its existence. It suffered 1 officer and 13 enlisted men who were killed in action or who died of their wounds and 2 officers and 157 enlisted men who died of disease, for a total of 173 fatalities. 52 were wounded.

== Commanders ==
- Colonel William McEntyre Dye
- Brevet Colonel Joseph Bloomfield Leake

== See also ==
- List of Iowa Civil War Units
- Iowa in the American Civil War
