= 26th Indiana Infantry Regiment =

26th Regiment Indiana Volunteer Infantry
- Flag of the United States, 1863-1865
- Active: August 31, 1861, to January 15, 1866
- Country: United States
- Allegiance: Union
- Branch: Infantry
- Engagements: Battle of Prairie Grove; Siege of Vicksburg; Battle of Brownsville; Battle of Stirling's Plantation; Battle of Fort Blakeley

The 26th Indiana Volunteer Infantry Regiment was an infantry regiment that served in the Union Army during the American Civil War.

== Service ==
The 26th Indiana Volunteer Infantry was organized and federalized in Indianapolis, [Indiana, on August 1, 1861. The regiment was processed and trained at Camp Morton in Indianapolis.

The regiment (26th Infantry Regiment of the Indiana Volunteers) was fielded in St. Louis, Missouri, and organized under the "Army of the West" Department of Missouri. This was accomplished on September 7, 1861. The 26th with many other military organizations made up the "Western Campaign".

Military actions to include battles:

- Advance on Springfield, Missouri. September, 1861. The action was a failure resulting in relieving of General John C. Frémont from command.
- Pursuit of General John Marmaduke's Confederates. Resulted in many skirmishes and losses of men.
- Defense of the Union Pacific Railroad at Sedalia, Missouri. July, 1862.
- Skirmish in Newtonia, Missouri. October 4, 1862. This was an extension of fighting that started on September 30, 1862.
- Reorganized under a district identified as "District of Southwest, Missouri". October, 1862.
- Advance on Fayetteville, Arkansas. December 1862.
- Battle of Prairie Grove, Arkansas. December 7, 1862.
- Skirmish at Dripping Springs, Arkansas. December 29, 1862.
- Battle "Siege of Vicksburg", Mississippi. June 11 - July 4, 1863.
- Relief of Port Hudson, Louisiana. July 23–27, 1863. Located 20 miles (32 km) north of Baton Rouge on the Mississippi River.
- Expedition to Carrollton, Louisiana. August 28, 1863. Carrollton is 2 miles (3 km) west of New Orleans.
- Expedition to Morganza, Louisiana. September 5–12, 1863.
- Battle of Stirling's Plantation/Farm. September 29, 1863.
- Encampment at Carrollton, Louisiana, with security of prisoners. October 1863.
- Expedition to the Rio Grande area, Texas.
- Battle of Brownsville, Texas. November 2–6, 1863. Pioneer Company led by Capt. Alden H. Jumper attached to MG Napoleon J. T. Dana's 2nd Div.]
- Garrison duty for the purpose of rest and relaxation. Brownsville, Texas, area and Fort Butler at Donaldsonville, Louisiana.
  - The regiment conducted reenlistment efforts and granted furloughs during the Garrison Duty period of time. October 1863 - May 1864.
- Reorganized under the District of LaFourche, Department of the Gulf. February 1865. Preparation for battle in the Gulf area.
- Campaign against Mobile, Alabama. March 17 - April 12, 1865. Siege of Spanish Fort and Fort Blakeley.
  - During this period of time, surrender actions were taking place at Appomattox Courthouse on April 9, 1865.
- The regiment mustered out of service [Deactivated] on January 15, 1866.

== Total strength and casualties ==
The regiment lost 96 enlisted men killed in action or died of wounds and 3 officers and 265 enlisted men who died of disease, for a total of 364 fatalities.

== Commanders ==
- Colonel William M. Wheatly
- Colonel John G. Clark

== See also ==
- List of Indiana Civil War regiments
- Indiana in the Civil War
