= Battle of Stirling's Plantation =

Battle of the American Civil War

Coordinates: 30.6834°N 91.6596°W

- Part of the American Civil War
Date	September 29, 1863
Location	Fordoche, Louisiana
Result	Confederate victory

Belligerents
United States (Union)	(Confederate States of America) CSA (Confederacy)

Commanders and leaders
Napoleon J. T. Dana; Joseph B. Leake	Thomas Green

Units involved
XIII Corps	Atchafalaya River forces

Strength
650	3,000

Casualties and losses
16 killed 45 wounded 454 captured	26 killed 85 wounded 10 missing

The Battle of Stirling's Plantation (also spelled Battle of Sterling's Plantation), also known as the Battle of Fordoche Bridge, was an American Civil War battle took place on September 29, 1863 in Fordoche, Louisiana.

== Background ==
Following the Siege of Vicksburg, Union Major General Francis J. Herron's Division of the Army of the Frontier was transferred down the Mississippi River to become a part of the 13th Corps. Arriving at Port Hudson on July 25, they remained there until August 13, 1863, when they were moved to Carrollton, above New Orleans.

Union Major General Nathaniel P. Banks had been ordered to invade and “plant the Flag in Texas”, which plans resulted in the Second Battle of Sabine Pass on September 8, 1863. As a part of his overall plan, Herron's division was to be transported to Morganza, Louisiana below the mouth of the Red River. Both Confederate Brigadier General Tom Green's cavalry and Brigadier General Alfred Mouton’s small infantry division were operating on the upper Atchafalaya River. Herron's movement would distract the Confederates from the invasion of Texas, and they hoped it would prevent the Confederate forces from moving to Texas had the Sabine Pass effort been successful.

On September 5, Herron's division was dispatched up the Mississippi on transports and made a landing below Morganza on the 7th. On the 8th the entire force marched through Morganza, and down the Opelousas road, reaching the Atchafalaya in the late afternoon. They retired to the Fordoche and camped there for the night. The next day the Division marched to Morganza where they went into camp.

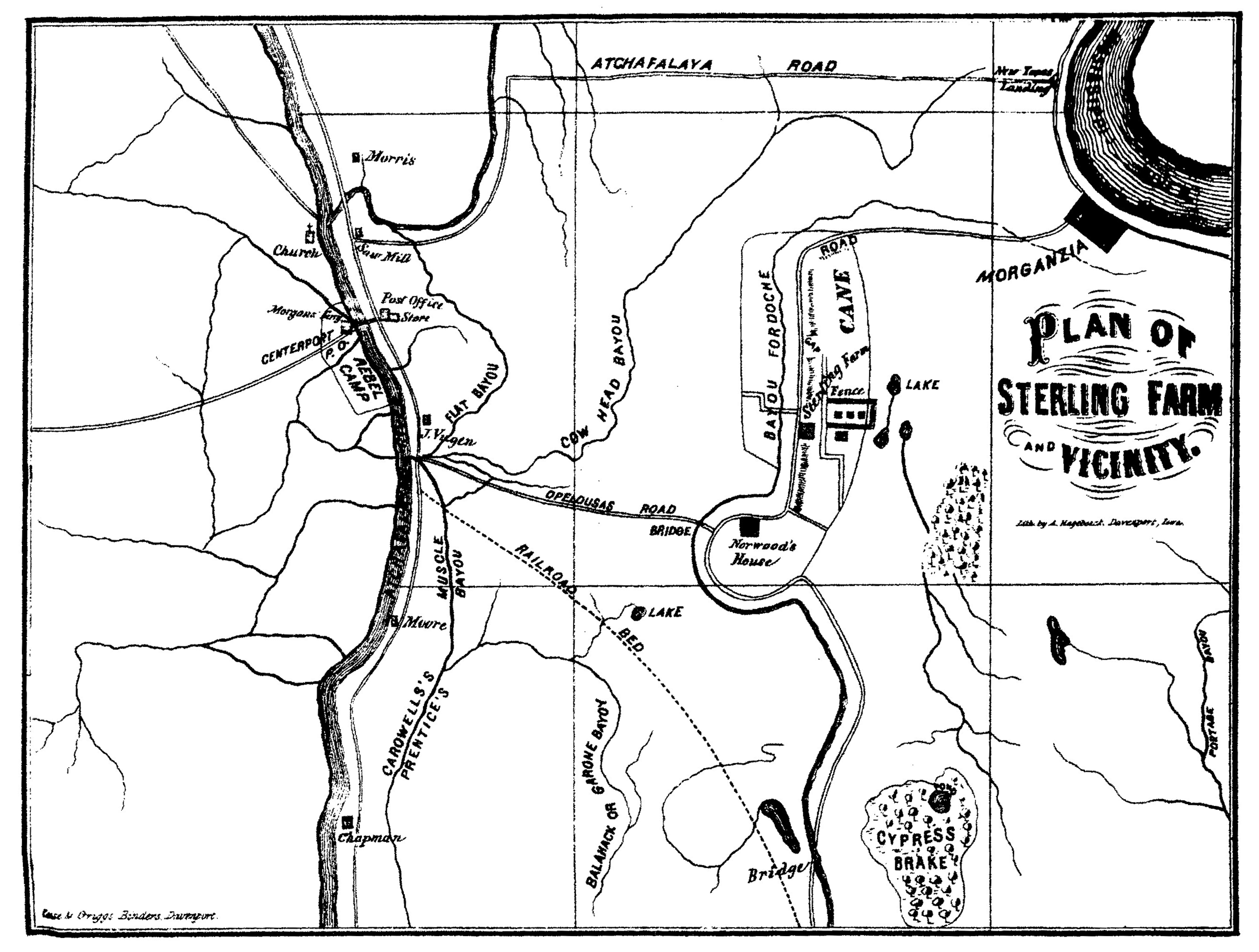
Map of Sterling Plantation and vicinity

On September 11, Herron proposed to send a detachment back to the bridge over the Fordoche to monitor Confederate activity on the west bank of the Atchafalaya, and from Morganza in an attempt to draw out Green's cavalry from the west bank of the Atchafalaya. Lt. Col. Joseph Bloomfield Leake of the 20th Iowa Volunteer Infantry Regiment was to be in command. A small provisional brigade was formed consisting of the 19th Iowa Volunteer Infantry Regiment under Maj. John Bruce, the 26th Indiana Infantry Regiment under Col. A.D. Rose, a section of Battery B, 1st Missouri Light Artillery, and a battalion of the 6th Missouri Volunteer Cavalry under Major Samuel Montgomery. To supplement the cavalry, a company of mounted infantry was created by drawing men from every regiment in the division and was led by Lt. Henry Walton of the 34th Iowa Volunteer Infantry Regiment. The road from Morganza to the Fordoche crossing followed the east bank of Bayou Fordoche, running west to a point about three miles from Morganza, then following a turn in the bayou, ran south three and a half miles to a loop in the bayou by Norwood's plantation. Just west of Norwoods, the Opelousas Road forked to the northwest, crossed the Fordoche, and ran on to the Atchafalaya across from present day Melville, Louisiana.

Shortly after leaving Morganza, the force encountered Confederate pickets and skirmished with them throughout the day until they reached the Norwood plantation, about six miles from the Archafalaya, where they went into camp. The country was unknown and Leake had no adequate maps. Mouton saw Leake's exposed position as an opportunity to destroy this force around Fordoche Bridge.

== Battle ==
Upon scouting the area on the 13th, Leake discovered that the position at Norwoods was not very tenable. There were several old roads and a half completed railbed in the vicinity that would make it easy for Confederates to move and get in his rear. Pickets and posts were set out and Leake requested to withdraw about a mile closer to the Stirling plantation, but this request was refused by Herron.

On the evening of the 15th Leake learned from local people that an attack was expected which resulted in his withdrawing north two miles to the Stirling plantation and establishing his camps there. This position, though better than Norwoods, still had defects due to the roads that gave the Confederates easy ability to move around the federal position.

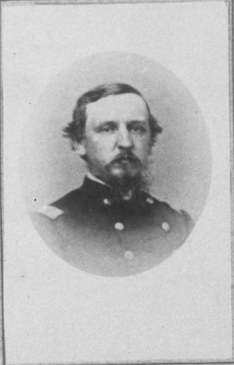
Lt. Col. J.B. Leake Cir. 1863

A levee ran along the east side of the road by the Stirling plantation, and Leake had a gap cut in it north of the house so that artillery could be moved through it if necessary. Pickets were maintained constantly, but the force was so small that they were deemed to be inadequate, and the whole brigade was uneasy as to their position.

The Confederates were becoming increasingly visible, and were often observed in small groups between Stirlings and Morganza. Although Herron was apprised of the rebels between him and Leake, he took no efforts to secure their rear. Herron was ill, and on the evening of the 28th turned over the command to Major General Napoleon J.T. Dana, and left for New Orleans.

Mouton had realized the opportunity to gobble up this small force and on the 19th had ordered Green to plan an attack, with the final decision made on the 25th. Green's 3,000 troops were at Centerpoint on the Atchafalaya on the 28th and commenced crossing by ferry at 3:00 p.m. Wallers and Roundtree's cavalry battalions together with Semme's battery were crossed by dark. Next to cross were Speight's and Mouton's infantry brigades, and finally the 4th, 5th and 7th Texas Cavalry, the last crossing by 1:00 a.m. on the 29th. The weather was very rainy.

On the morning of the 29th Mouton's and Speight's brigades were sent by a trail through the woods and swamps that intersected the Opelousas road about two miles north of the Stirling plantation. Mouton was to remain in this position to block any relief force that might be sent from Morganza, and Speight's brigade would launch the primary attack on Leakes right and rear.

The balance of the Confederate cavalry marched via the road toward the Fordoche Bridge near the Norwood house. Arriving there around 11:00 a.m. and commenced skirmishing with the Federal cavalry pickets at the Fordoche bridge. After about a half hour, sounds of firing was heard to the north at the Stirling farm.

Just before noon, a shot was heard from the picket post north of camp at Stirling's, and then a number more shots were heard from the cane fields to the north and east of the house. Mouton had begun his attack. Leake ordered the artillery up the road and in position at the gap in the levee to fire across the cane fields. The 19th Iowa was ordered to a fence running east to west behind the house and commence firing. The 26th Indiana was then posted to the left of the 19th, facing west, and ordered to fire obliquely to the right.

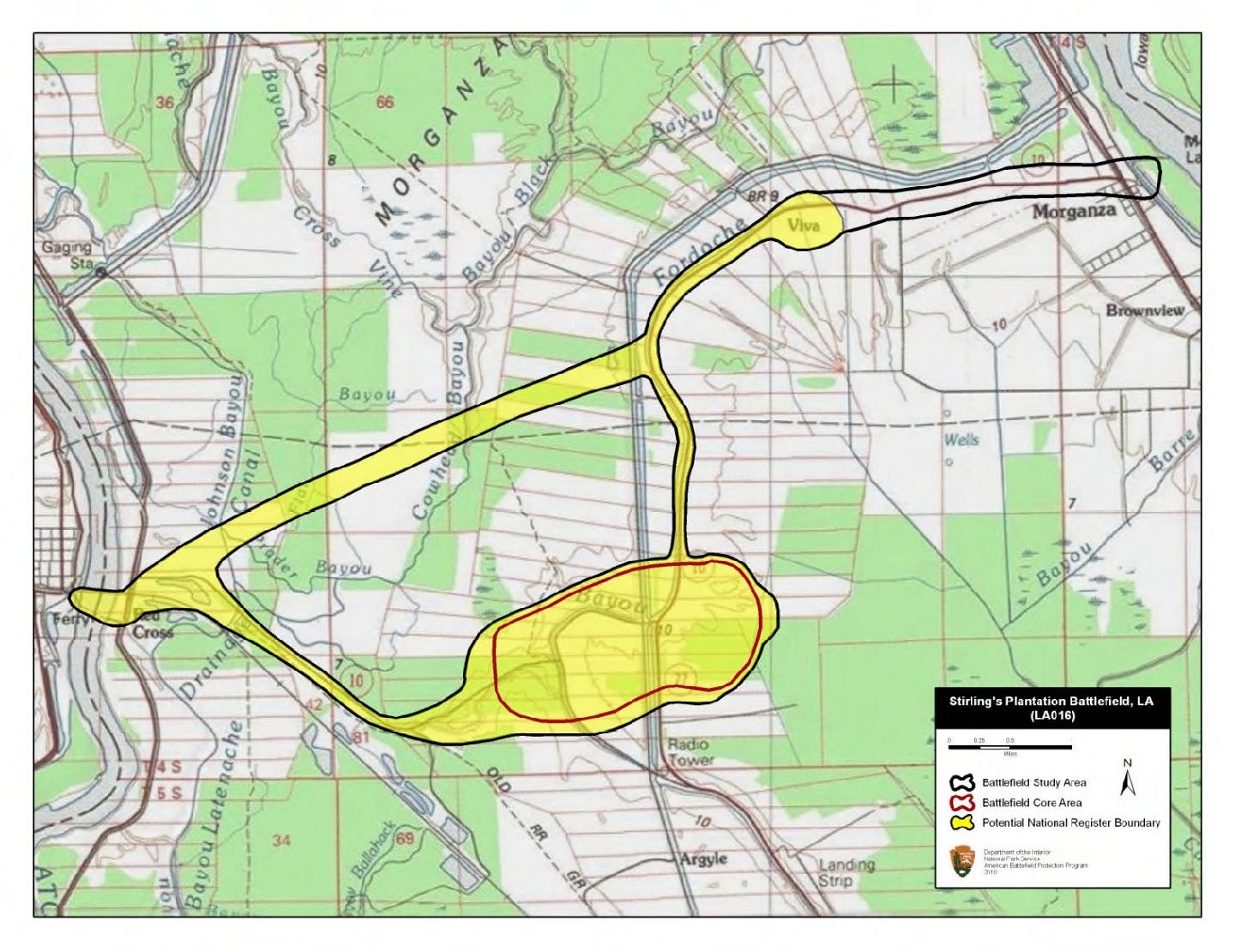
Map of Stirling's Plantation Battlefield core and study areas by the American Battlefield Protection Program.

For some reason, the artillery had not made it to the gap in the levee and were being moved by hand among the outbuildings behind the house, where they were totally useless.

Leake had available only 450 infantry, as so many were on picket. Both the 19th and 26th were pushed back from their position through the Stirling buildings, and took up a position on the levee, now facing east, with the levee serving as an excellent breastwork.

The Confederates were an overwhelming force, and initially attempted to turn the right of the 19th. The 26th was pulled out and placed on the 19ths right, with the 26th now facing south. Seeing the change in front, the Confederates now moved to their right and poured through the gap in the levee, attempting to turn the left flank of the 19th. The weather was hot and the men were spent. Leake had been shot in his foot, unhorsed and captured, and due to the confusion, no other officer assumed command.

Meanwhile, the Confederate cavalry had completely routed the federal cavalry to the south near the Norwood farm. The Federal cavalry streamed away toward Morganza with such rapidity that none of them were captured. The routed cavalry passed to the east of the Stirling plantation and the fight raging there. The infantry at Stirling's were so involved with their own fight that they were not aware of what had happened to their cavalry. Most of Green's cavalry were clothed in Union uniforms that had been captured at Brashear City three months before. With the flight of the Union cavalry, Green advanced his column up the road from Norwoods to the Sterling plantation. The Union infantry observed the advancing column and supposed them to be the 6th Missouri. Not until they were fired upon did the Union infantry realize that this was Green's cavalry coming in on their other flank. Vastly outnumbered, leaderless, and assailed from all sides, the Federals surrendered piecemeal.

== Aftermath ==
Only a few Union infantry managed to escape. The Federals lost 16 dead, 45 wounded, and 454 prisoners. Confederate losses were 26 dead, 85 wounded and ten missing. Additionally, the Confederates took two 10-pounder Parrott rifled guns with caissons, two new ambulances, one hospital wagon loaded with medical supplies, and all of the arms of the captured men. Green quickly consolidated his prisoners and spoils and moved back to the river, crossing it as quickly as possible. The prisoners were then marched via Alexandria, Natchitoches, Mansfield and Shreveport to the Camp Ford prison camp near Tyler, Texas, where they arrived on October 23, 1863.

== Sources ==
- Bergeron, Arthur W., Guide to Louisiana Confederate Military Units 1861-1865. (Baton Rouge: Louisiana State University Press, 1989)
- Dungan, J. Irvine, History of the 19th Regiment Iowa Volunteer Infantry. (Davenport, Iowa: Publishing House of Luse and Griggs, 1865)
- "The Civil War Diary of Lt. Col J. B. Leake," edited by Randal B. Gilbert. Chronicles of Smith County, Texas. (Tyler, Texas: Smith County Historical Society, Vol. 41, No. 1, 1996)
- Irwin, Richard B. History of the 19th Army Corps [Facsimile reprint of 1892 edition]. (Baton Rouge: Elliot's Book Shop Press, 1985)
