= Prairie Grove Battlefield State Park =

State park in Arkansas, United States

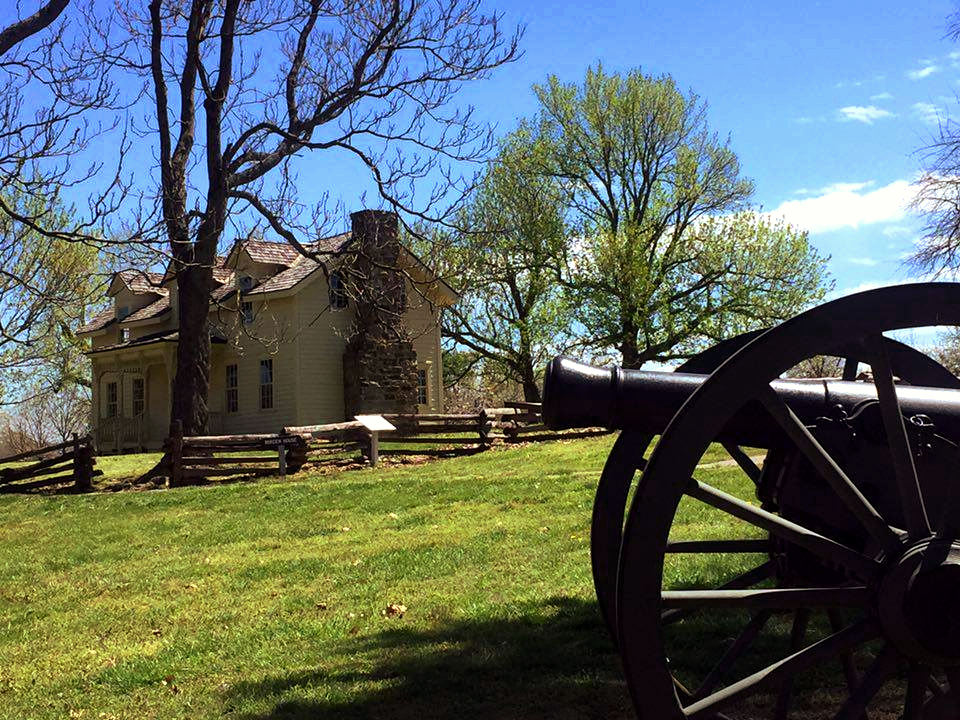
- During the Battle of Prairie Grove, on December 7, 1862, the Borden Farm was the scene of some of the heaviest fighting of the day.

- Location in Arkansas Prairie Grove Battlefield State Park (the United States)
- 35°58′59.2″N 94°18′38.4″W
- Location: Prairie Grove, Arkansas

History
- Established: 1957
- Original use: Field, forest, battlefield

Site notes
- Area: 707.8 acres (286.4 ha)
- Governing body: Arkansas State Parks
- Website: Official website
- Prairie Grove Battlefield
- U.S. National Register of Historic Places
- NRHP reference No.: 70000133 (original); 92001523 (increase 1); 05001167 (increase 2)

Significant dates
- Added to NRHP: September 4, 1970
- Boundary increases: November 9, 1992; October 27, 2005

The Prairie Grove Battlefield State Park is a state park located in Prairie Grove, Arkansas. It memorializes the Battle of Prairie Grove, fought on December 7, 1862, during the American Civil War. The battle secured U.S. Army control of northwestern Arkansas.

== Description and administrative history ==
In 1908, the local chapter of the United Daughters of the Confederacy (UDC) purchased 9 acres (3.6 ha) at the center of the Prairie Grove battlefield. The UDC maintained it as a meeting spot and in commemoration of the battle for almost 50 years. A local business owner and politician, J. Sherman Dill, procured $10,000 ($358,000 in today's dollars) while serving in the 38th Arkansas General Assembly to improve the park. These funds led to the construction of the stone archway at the park entrance, a wooden bandstand, and a gravel driveway around 1925. However, the park fell into disrepair during the Great Depression and was fenced off from use for years.

In 1953, a newly formed Lions Club chapter adopted the park as a club project, raising money through community events and constructing benches, picnic tables, and sidewalks. In 1957, a 55-foot (17 m) stone chimney from nearby Rhea's Mill Township was carefully moved to the park site. Other historic buildings from the area, including an 1834 log home and blacksmith's shop, were moved to the park site in the following years.

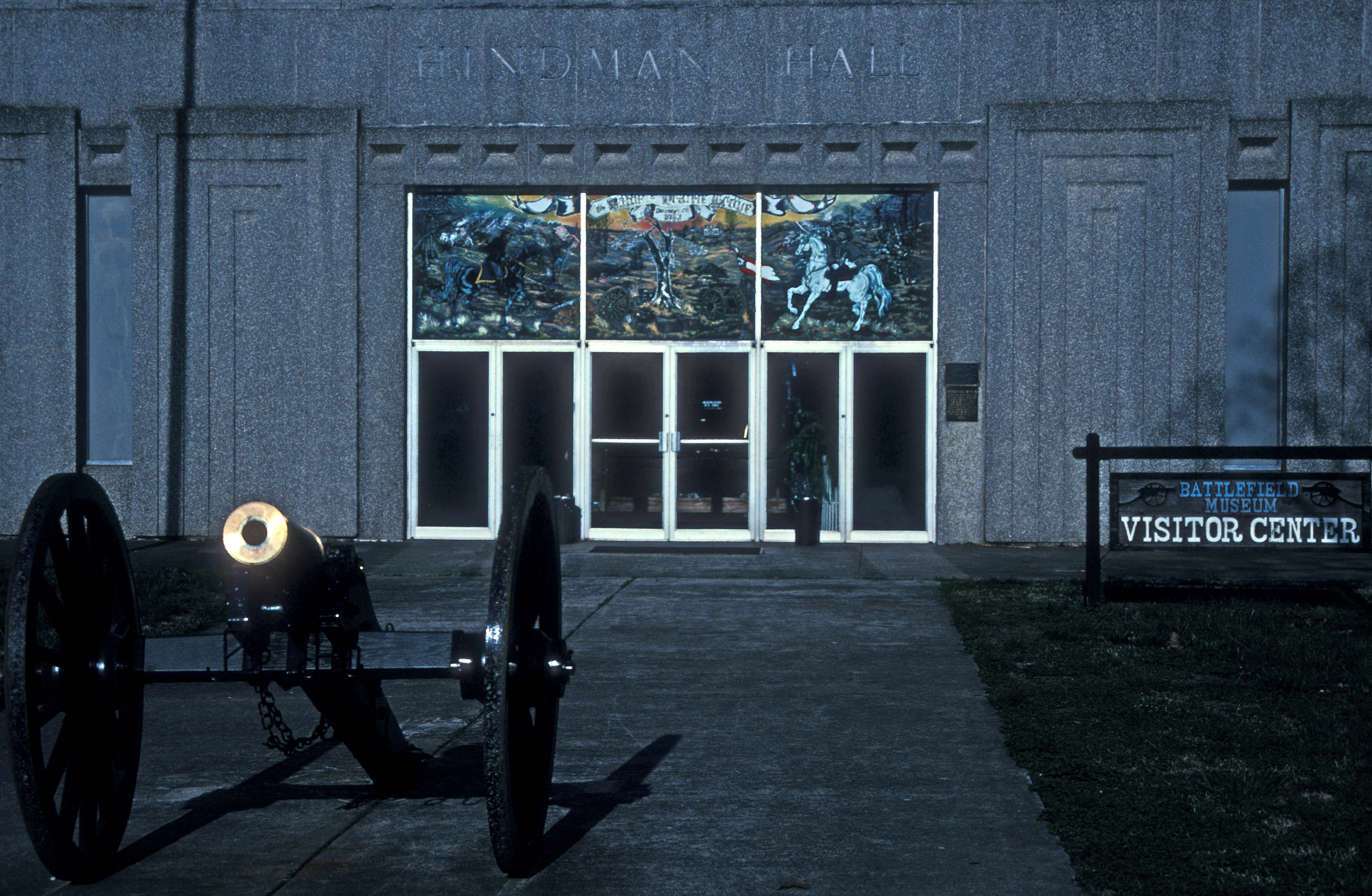
Hindman Hall

A museum was constructed following a bequest by Biscoe Hindman, the grandson of C.S. Major General Thomas C. Hindman who commanded the 1st Corps, Army of the Trans-Mississippi, during the battle. Dedicated on May 31, 1964, the museum was named Hindman Hall. The park was added to the state park system in 1971 in a joint effort among Governor Dale Bumpers and state legislators Morriss Henry, Hugh Kincaid, and Charles W. Stewart. The state park grew through land acquisitions and donations in 1980, 1992, and 2005.

The portion of the state park within a 64-acre (26 ha) triangle formed by North Road on the northwest and Highway 62 was first listed on the National Register of Historic Places in 1970. The area of this district was increased in 1992 to 65.8 acres (26.6 ha) and then again in 2005 to 707.8 acres (286.4 ha).

Prominent features of the state park include its battle monument, a chimney carefully relocated here from the site of a skirmish, and the Hindman Museum. The Prairie Grove Airlight Outdoor Telephone Booth, which is listed on the National Register of Historic Places, is opposite the entrance to the park on Highway 62.

== Battle of Prairie Grove reenactment ==
An American Civil War reenactment is held at the state park during the first weekend in December of even-numbered years.

== See also ==
- Borden House (Prairie Grove, Arkansas)
- List of Arkansas state parks
- National Register of Historic Places listings in Washington County, Arkansas
