= Borden Farm =

Borden Farm may refer to:

in Canada

- Borden Farm, Nepean, Ontario, a neighborhood

in the United States

- Borden Farm (Portsmouth, Rhode Island), listed on the NRHP in Newport County, Rhode Island

== See also ==
- Borden House (disambiguation)
