= William McEntyre Dye =

American military officer (1831–1899)

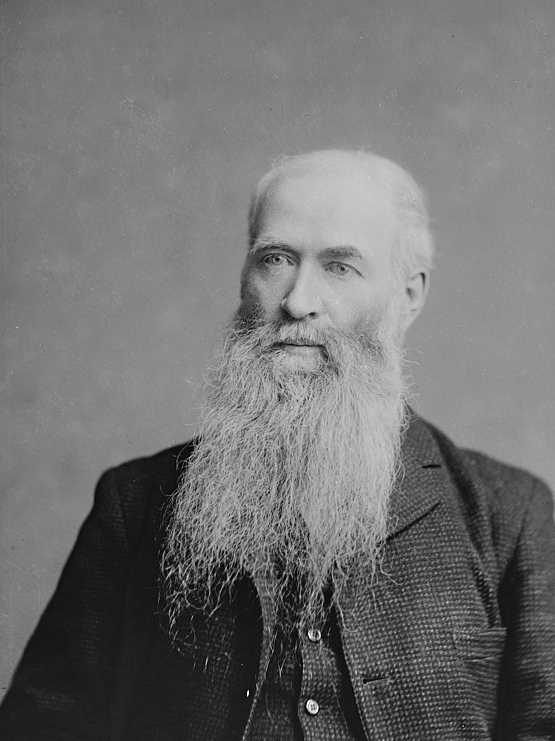
- Born: January 26, 1831; Washington, Pennsylvania, US
- Died: November 13, 1899 (aged 68); Muskegon, Michigan, US
- Burial place: Graceland Cemetery
- Military career
- Allegiance: United States (Union)
- Branch: U.S. Army and Egyptian Army
- Service years: 1853–1870 (U.S. Army); 1873–1878 (Egyptian Army)
- Rank: Colonel (U.S.); Brevet Brigadier General (U.S.); Colonel (Egypt)
- Commands: 20th Iowa Volunteer Infantry Regiment
- Conflicts: American Civil War; Battle of Prairie Grove; Siege of Vicksburg; Battle of Brownsville; Siege of Fort Morgan; Battle of Fort Blakeley; Egyptian–Ethiopian War; Battle of Gura
- Other work: Chief of Washington, D.C. Police Department; Military advisor to the Emperor of Korea; Author

William McEntyre Dye (January 26, 1831 – November 13, 1899) was a soldier from the United States who served in military capacities around the world. He became a brevet brigadier general in the Union Army during the American Civil War, a colonel in the Egyptian army and military adviser to the King of Korea.

== Civil War ==
Dye was born in Washington, Pennsylvania in 1831 and was appointed to West Point in 1849. He graduated in 1853 as a 2nd lieutenant in the 4th U.S. Infantry. By 1859 he was the regimental quartermaster.

When the Civil War began in 1861, Dye was a captain in the U.S. Army. However he accepted a commission as colonel of the 20th Iowa Infantry Regiment on August 25, 1862. In 1862 Colonel Dye commanded the 2nd Brigade, 2nd Division of the Army of the Frontier. Dye led the brigade at the battle of Prairie Grove where his division was under the overall command of Brig. Gen. Francis J. Herron. The following year, Dye returned to command of his regiment and was part of Herron's division of reinforcements sent to aid the Union army besieging Vicksburg.

After the fall of Vicksburg, Dye commanded various brigades in the Department of the Gulf. He was in command of a brigade during the Battle of Brownsville. In May 1864 he was brevetted colonel in the U.S. Army for his service in the Red River Campaign. He led his regiment in the attack on Fort Morgan during the battle of Mobile Bay. For the next year he served in the Reserve Corps in the Department of the Gulf. Once again he led his regiment into battle around Mobile, this time at the battle of Fort Blakeley. He was brevetted brigadier general of volunteers dated March 13, 1865 and brevetted colonel U.S.A. on April 9, 1865 for services at Mobile, Alabama. His last service in the volunteer army was as the Exchange Agent for POWs in the Military Division of West Mississippi.

== Egyptian Army ==
General Dye was mustered out of the volunteer service on July 8, 1865. On Jan 14, 1866 he was promoted to major of the 4th U.S. Infantry but in 1870 he was unassigned and discharged from the U.S. Army. In 1868 Civil War veteran, Thaddeus P. Mott, won the confidence of Ismail Pasha, the Khedive of Egypt, and encouraged him to use other Civil War veterans to help modernize the Egyptian army. In 1873 Dye travelled to Egypt to become one of several Union and Confederate veterans who offered their service to the Khedive. There Dye received the rank of colonel. General Charles P. Stone was another American veteran in Egypt who now held the rank of major general in the Egyptian army. Stone first suggested Dye to be the American chief-of-staff in the upcoming campaign against Abyssinia. However, Dye refused the appointment as he had no confidence in the Egyptian commander. The position of chief of staff eventually went to General William W. Loring and Dye was appointed assistant chief-of-staff under Loring. At the battle of Gura Dye was wounded in the foot and later was court martialed for hitting another Egyptian officer. The matter remained unresolved and he returned to the United States in 1878.

Dye would write a book about his experience in the Egyptian Army, titled Moslem Egypt and Christian Abyssinia; Or, Military Service Under the Khedive, in his Provinces and Beyond their Borders, as Experienced by the American Staff. It was published in 1880.

== Korean government ==
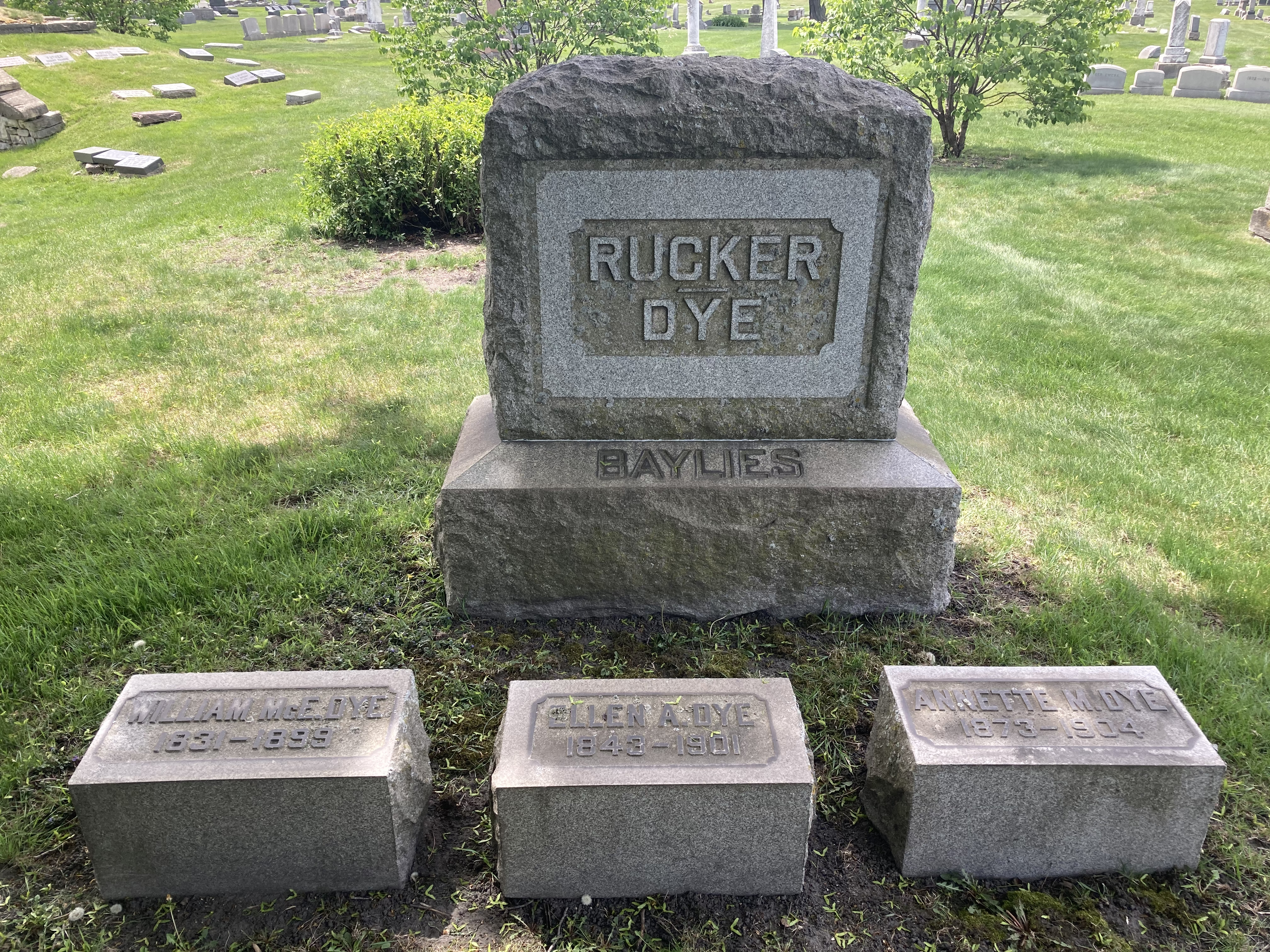
Dye's grave at Graceland Cemetery

Upon his return to the U.S. Dye served as the Chief of Police in Washington, D.C. In 1888, General Philip H. Sheridan recommended Dye for the position as Chief Military Adviser to the Korean Government under King Gojong. He served the king for the next 11 years, even writing a military treatise in Korean. When he was in Korea, the assassination of Empress Myeongseong occurred. He received a report from Lee Hak-gyun; however, it was too late. He returned to the United States in 1899 but died the same year in Muskegon, Michigan.

He was buried at Graceland Cemetery in Chicago.
