= Borden House (Prairie Grove, Arkansas) =

Historic house in Arkansas, United States

- U.S. National Register of Historic Places
- U.S. Historic district – Contributing property
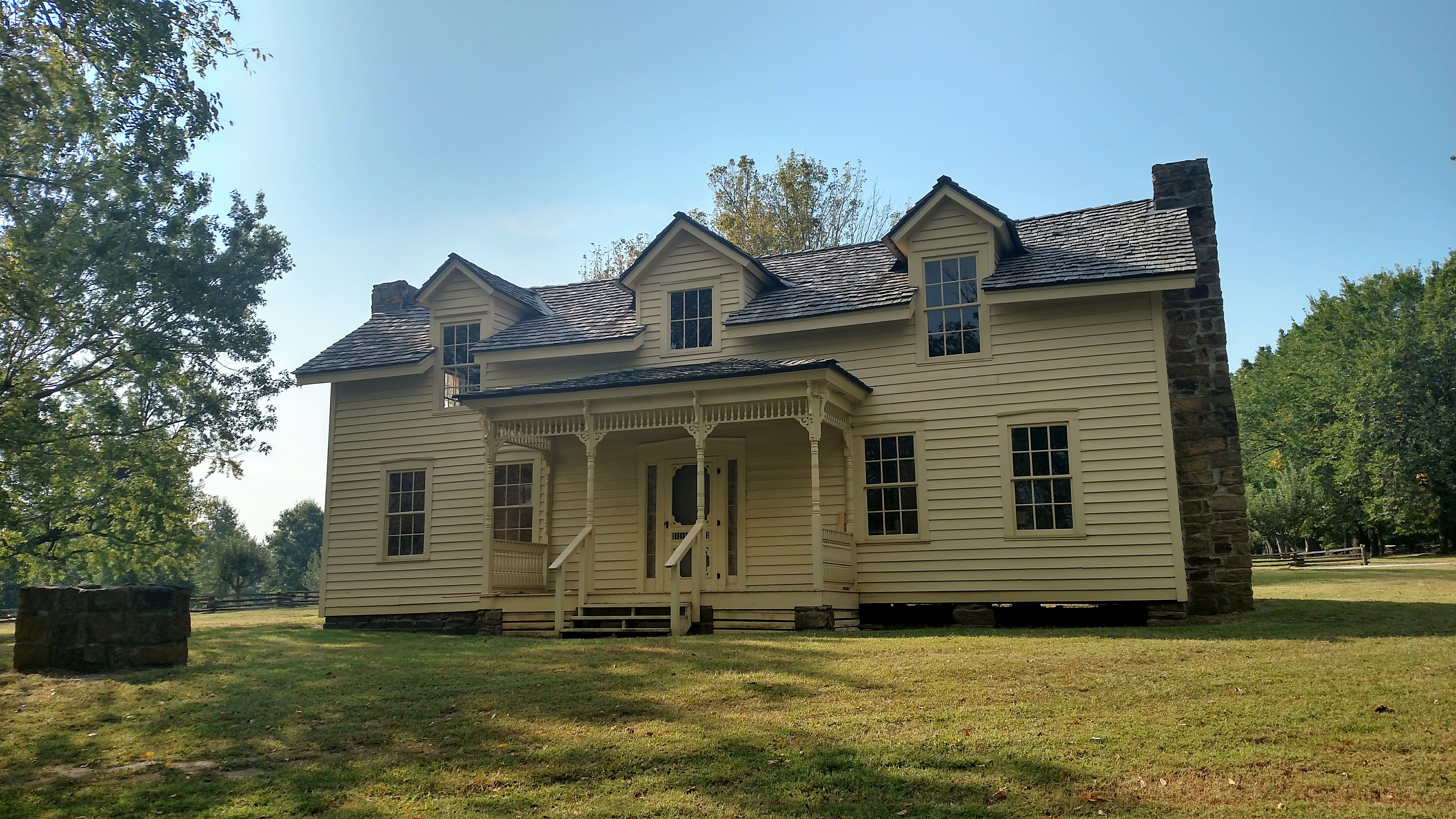
- The Borden House

- Location within Arkansas Location within the United States
- Nearest city: Prairie Grove, Arkansas
- Coordinates: 35°59′7″N 94°18′15″W
- Area: less than one acre
- Built: 1862
- Part of: Prairie Grove Battlefield State Park (ID92001523)
- NRHP reference No.: 77000278

Significant dates
- Added to NRHP: March 17, 1977
- Designated CP: November 9, 1992

The Borden House is a historic house on the grounds of Prairie Grove Battlefield State Park in Prairie Grove, Arkansas. In the Battle of Prairie Grove on December 7, 1862, the original Borden House was one of the central points of the Confederate line, and was the scene of heavy casualties. The Borden House was burned the next day. Archibald Borden built the current house on the original site. It is a 1 1/2-story wood-frame house, five bays wide, with a side-gable roof pierced by three gabled dormers. A porch extends across the center three bays of the front.

The house was listed on the National Register of Historic Places in 1977, and included in an enlarged National Register listing for the battlefield in 1992.

== See also ==
- National Register of Historic Places listings in Washington County, Arkansas
