= Borden-Pond House =

Historic house in Massachusetts, United States

- U.S. National Register of Historic Places
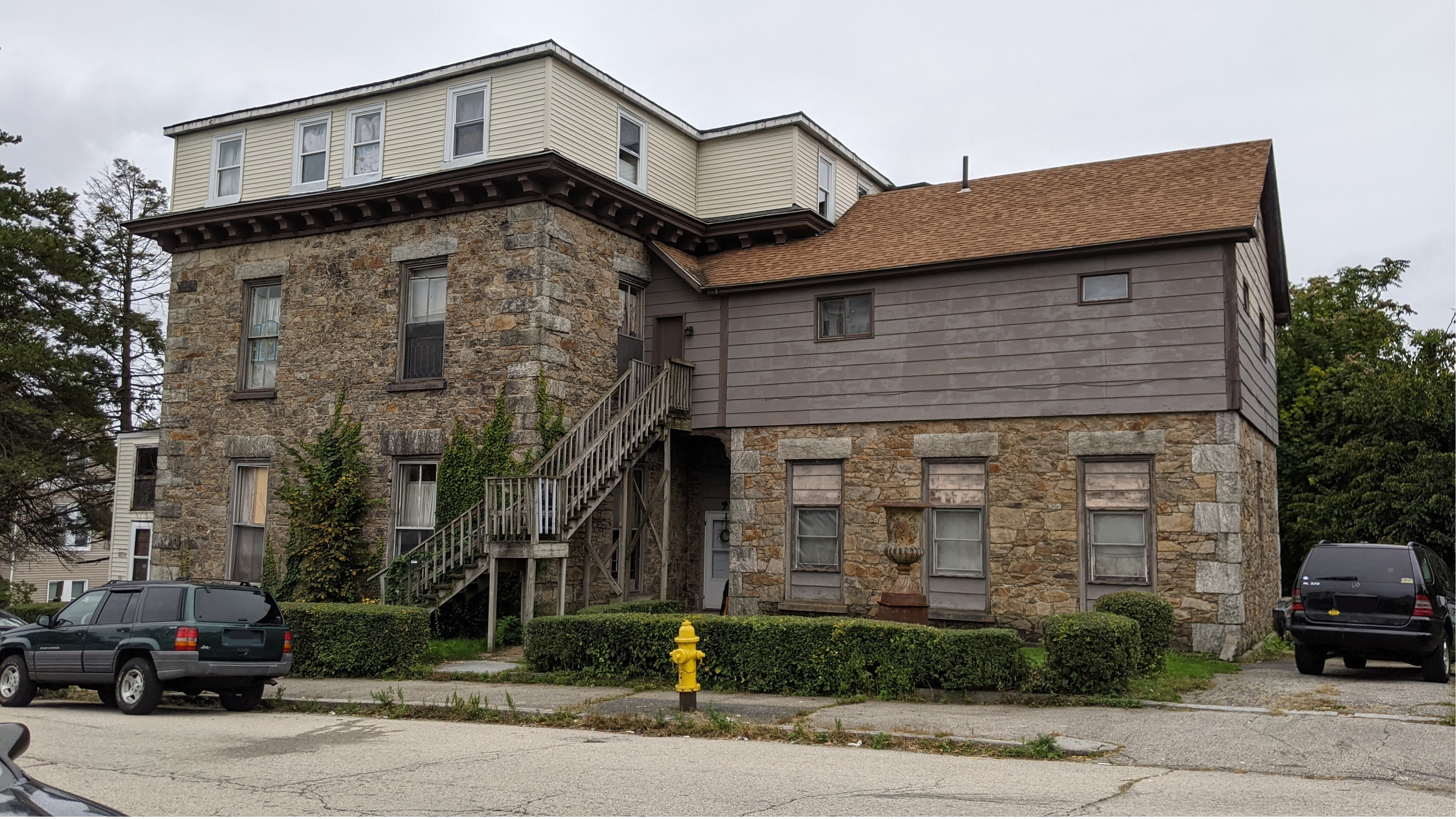

- Location within Massachusetts Location within the United States
- Location: 40 Laurel St., Worcester, Massachusetts
- Coordinates: 42°16′8″N 71°47′34″W
- Area: less than one acre
- Built: 1856
- Architectural style: Second Empire
- MPS: Worcester MRA
- NRHP reference No.: 80000590
- Added to NRHP: March 05, 1980

The Borden-Pond House is a historic house at 40 Laurel Street in Worcester, Massachusetts. Built about 1856 but probably not completed until 1861, it is a prominent early example of Second Empire architecture, and one of a small number of stone villas to survive (out of a larger number built) in the neighborhood. Lucius Pond, its second owner, was an important local machinist. The house was listed on the National Register of Historic Places in 1980.

== Description and history ==
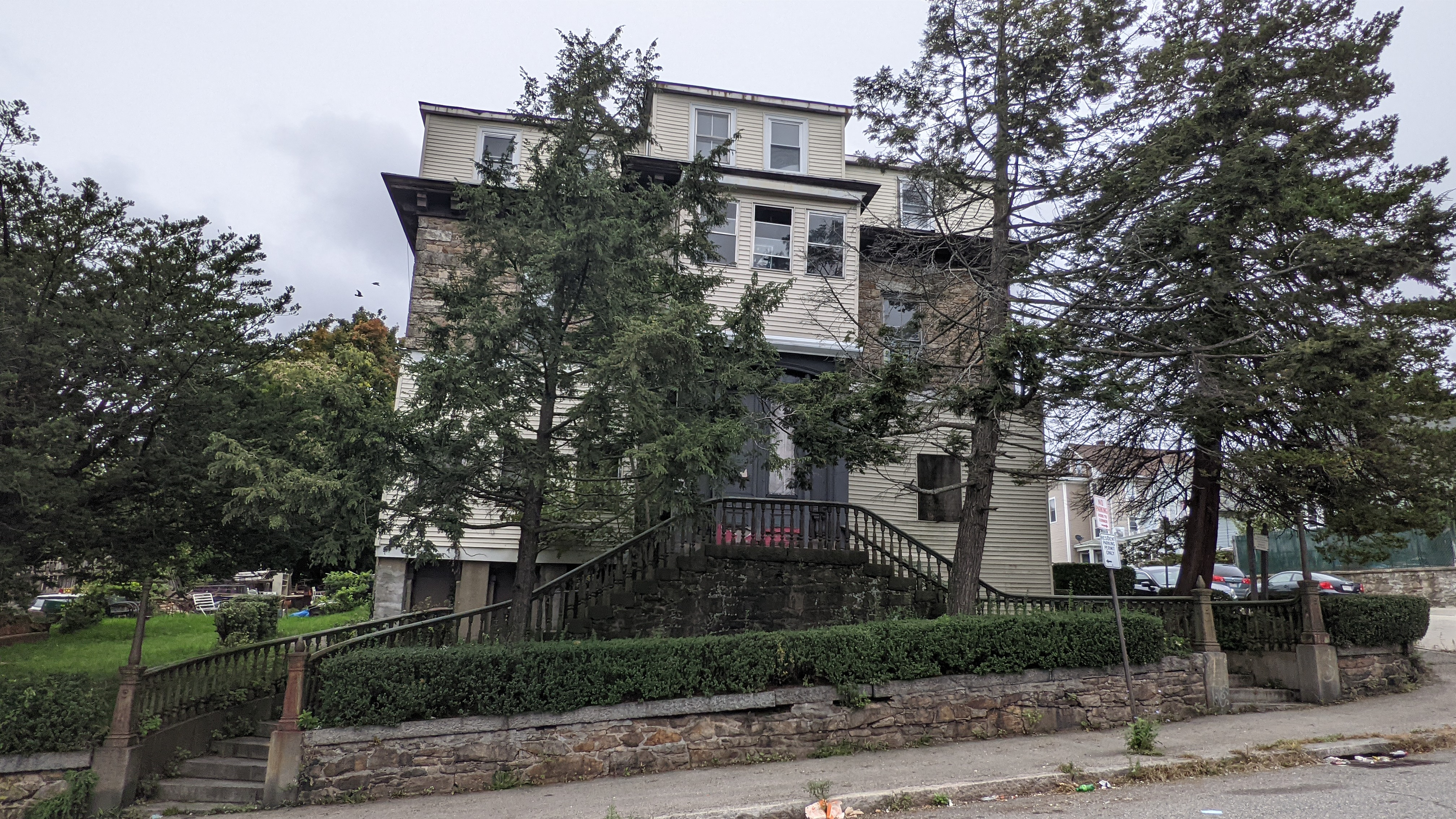
Borden-Pond house in Worcester, MA

The Borden-Pond House stands in a residential area overlooking Interstate 290 on Worcester's east side, at the northwest corner of Laurel and Edward Streets. It is a three-story stone structure, set on a stone foundation partially exposed by the steeply sloping lot. The lower two stories of the main block are stone, with a cornice and roof skirt separating them from the third floor, which is framed in wood and finished in clapboards. The house originally had a mansard roof. A two-story ell extends to the rear; it is stone on the first floor and wood-frame on the second, with a gabled roof. The house is a rare survivor from a period when a number of stone villas were built in this area; most of them have been demolished.

Construction on the house began c.1856–59, probably by John Borden, a mason and its first resident. According to local lore, Borden could not afford to finisht the building, and sold it to Lucius Pond in 1861. Pond was a leading local industrialist, who helped invent the Ellsworth repeating rifle. Pond was director of a local bank when rumors of its insolvency led to his flight in 1875. He was arrested in San Francisco, California, attempting to gain passage on a ship to Australia. Pond was convicted of forging bank notes, and spent seven years in prison.

== See also ==
- National Register of Historic Places listings in eastern Worcester, Massachusetts
