= Napoleon J. T. Dana =

American Army officer

Napoléon J. T. Dana
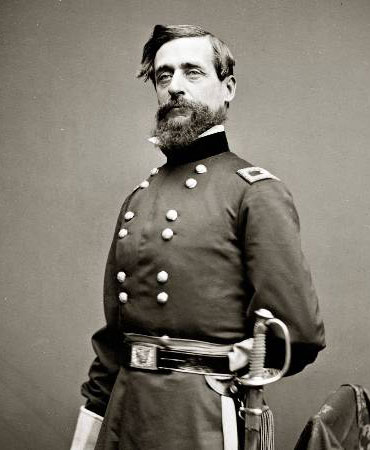
- Born: April 15, 1822; Eastport, Maine
- Died: July 15, 1905 (aged 83); Portsmouth, New Hampshire
- Burial place: Harmony Grove Cemetery, Portsmouth, New Hampshire
- Military career
- Allegiance: United States of America; Union
- Branch: United States Army; Union Army
- Service years: 1842–1855; 1861–1865; 1894
- Rank: Major General
- Commands: 3rd Brigade, 2nd Division, II Corps
- Conflicts: Mexican–American War; Battle of Monterrey; Siege of Veracruz; Battle of Cerro Gordo; American Civil War; Battle of Ball's Bluff; Peninsula Campaign; Battle of Antietam; Battle of Stirling's Plantation; Battle of Brownsville
- Other work: Agent, Miner, Railroad Superintendent, Author

Napoleon Jackson Tecumseh Dana (April 15, 1822 – July 15, 1905) was a career U.S. Army officer who fought with distinction during the Mexican–American War and served as a general in the Union Army during the American Civil War. He was wounded several times during his military career, often severely, and later in life was involved with railroads and veteran soldier affairs in the U.S.

== Early life ==
Dana was born at Fort Sullivan, in Eastport, Maine. He was a first cousin of James J. Dana and later would be the father-in-law of John C. Tidball. His father Nathaniel G. Dana, also a West Point graduate and officer serving in the 1st U.S. Artillery, was stationed at Fort Sullivan at the time, but his father died when Dana was eleven years old. Dana's paternal grandfather, Luther Dana, was a naval officer in the American Revolution, and his maternal grandfather, Woodbury Langdon, served as a member of the Continental Congress (with his brother John Langdon), and later a U.S. Senator and governor of New Hampshire.

When he was sixteen, Dana entered the U.S. Military Academy in 1838, and graduated from there four years later, standing 29th out of 56. He was commissioned a second lieutenant in the 7th U.S. Infantry Regiment on July 1, 1842.

With the 7th Infantry, Dana was stationed in the garrison at Fort Pike, Louisiana, from 1842 to 1843, then at Pass Christian, Mississippi, in 1843, back at Ft. Pike from 1843 to 1845, and afterwards he was part of the Military Occupation of Texas in 1845.

=== War with Mexico ===
During the Mexican–American War, Dana and the 7th participated in the defense of Fort Brown from May 3–9, 1846 and then fought at the Battle of Monterrey on September 21–23. He was promoted to first lieutenant on February 16, 1847, and took part in the Siege of Vera Cruz on March 9–29.

During the Battle of Cerro Gordo on April 17 and 18, Dana was severely wounded in the hip while storming the entrenchments on Telegraph Hill. A burial detail came across the injured Dana after he had been left on the field for about 36 hours; Dana had been left for dead where he fell. For his actions at Cerro Gordo, Dana was commissioned a brevet captain.

After recovering from the injury, Dana was on recruiting service from 1847 to 1848, on duty at Boston, Mass. as Assistant Quartermaster in 1848, and then various posts in Minnesota and Washington, D.C. from 1848 to 1855. During this time he superintended the construction of Fort Ripley. He resigned from the army on March 1, 1855, relocating to St. Paul, Minnesota, to become a banker. In 1857 Dana began serving in the Minnesota State Militia as a brigadier general until 1861.

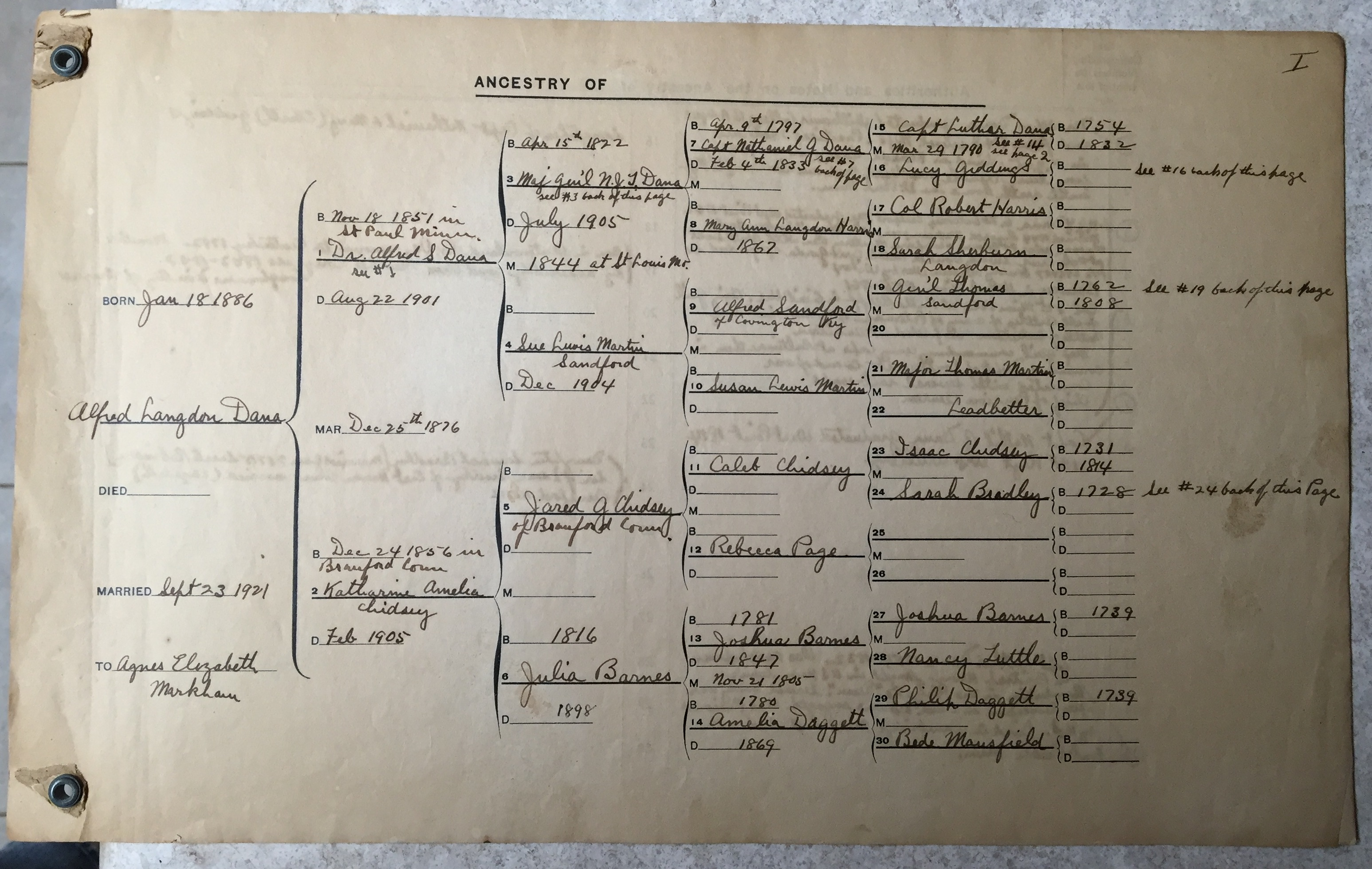
Pedigree of Maj Gen NJT Dana 1822 going back to his Grandfather Capt Luther Dana 1790

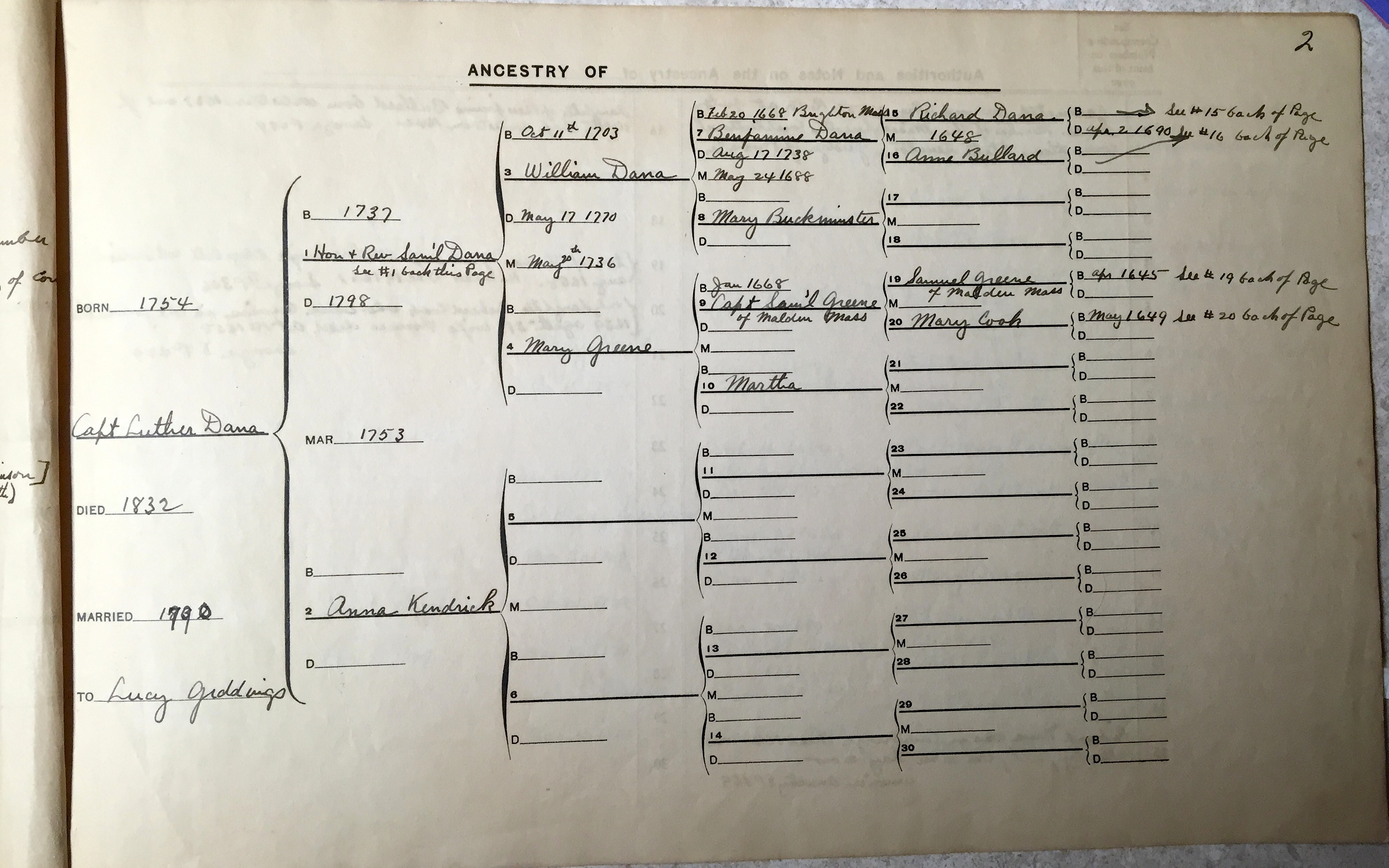
Pedigree of Capt Luther Dana 1790 (Grandfather of Maj Gen NJT Dana 1822) back to Richard Dana 1648

== Civil War service ==
Napoleon J.T. Dana in 1862

Dana chose to follow the Union cause in the fall of 1861, and entered the Union Army as Colonel of the 1st Minnesota Volunteer Infantry Regiment on October 2. He was then given brigade command in Brig. Gen. Charles P. Stone's Division of the Army of the Potomac on October 20, an assignment lasting until March 23, 1862. During this time Dana and his men took part in the Union fiasco at the Battle of Ball's Bluff on October 21.

On February 6, 1862, Dana was appointed brigadier general, February 3, 1862, and given command of the 3rd Brigade of the 2nd Division in the Union II Corps, a brigade consisting of volunteer soldiers from New York, Massachusetts, and Michigan. Dana led this brigade throughout the Peninsula Campaign in the spring and summer of 1862, participating in the Siege of Yorktown in early April to early May, the Battle of Seven Pines in late May and early June, the Battle of White Oak Swamp on June 30, the Battle of Glendale also on June 30, and the Battle of Malvern Hill on July 1.

In early July, shortly after Malvern Hill, Dana became ill and was diagnosed with "remittent fever." He was sent to Philadelphia, Pennsylvania, to recover and he remained there for six weeks. Dana was declared fit for duty near the beginning of the Maryland Campaign and rejoined his command.

=== Antietam ===
Dana led his brigade notably during the Battle of Antietam near Sharpsburg, Maryland, on September 17, 1862, where he was severely wounded. At Antietam, Dana and his brigade (part of Brig. Gen. John Sedgwick's 2nd Division of Maj. Gen. Edwin Vose Sumner's II Corps) forded the Antietam Creek at about 7:30 a.m. and marched to the support of the right of the Union line. Sumner ordered Sedgwick's division to form three parallel lines of battle, with Dana's men making up the second line. Sumner led this division due west, desiring to push any remaining Confederate forces through Sharpsburg and toward the Potomac River. They entered what is now called the East Woods, across the Hagerstown Turnpike, and into the area known as the West Woods.

Marching about fifty yards behind the leading Union brigade, Dana's command began to receive artillery fire but continued forward. Shortly after entering the West Woods, Dana's brigade was struck hard on their left by Confederate troops, and became in danger of being completely surrounded and cut off. Maneuvering his soldiers in the difficult terrain, Dana led his men to the relative safety of the Miller Farm, despite receiving a serious wound to his left leg. When the pain in his leg became unbearable, Dana turned command of his brigade over to his senior regimental commander, Col. Norman Hall, and was carried to a Union field hospital in nearby Keedysville for treatment. After spending two days at the field hospital, Dana was sent to Washington, D.C. and later again to Philadelphia to recover. At Antietam, Dana's command lost about 900 men killed, wounded, or missing.

Dana as a major general

Dana was appointed to the rank of major general on November 29, 1862, to rank from that date, but could not resume duty until the summer of 1863 due to his wound. Because his appointment was not confirmed by the U.S. Senate when first submitted by President Lincoln, the President resubmitted the nomination on March 6, 1863, and the Senate confirmed it on March 9, 1863. During the Gettysburg campaign he commanded the Defenses of Philadelphia from June 26 to July 8. He next briefly led the 2nd division of Maj. Gen. Darius N. Couch's Department of the Susquehanna from July 11–15.

That fall, Dana was given divisional and then corps command in the Department of the Gulf. He led the department's second division from September 26, 1863, to January 3, 1864, during which he participated in the small action at Fordoche Bayou as well as the expedition from Brazos Santiago to Laredo, Texas, and was overall Union commander during the Battle of Stirling's Plantation. He commanded the XIII Corps from October 25, 1863, to January 9, 1864, and then led the first division from March 11 to April 3. Dana was then transferred to the Western Theater, and joined the Army of the Tennessee that fall. He was given command of the District of Vicksburg from August 19 to November 28, and then briefly led the XVI Corps from October 15 to November 7.

=== Vicksburg command and the Sultana ===
Dana returned to command in Vicksburg, Mississippi, until December 8, 1864, when he was ordered to head the Department of Mississippi, this last of his U.S. Army assignments lasting until May 14, 1865. He was also in overall command of the area where the steamboat Sultana exploded on the Mississippi River near Memphis, Tennessee on April 27. The paddlewheeler had been contracted by the U.S. Government to return home recently released Union prisoners of war, and when it docked in Vicksburg for repairs to leaky boilers it became grossly overcrowded with soldiers wanting to get home. An April 27, 2007, article in the Washington Times explained what Dana had been told about the ship before it departed Vicksburg:

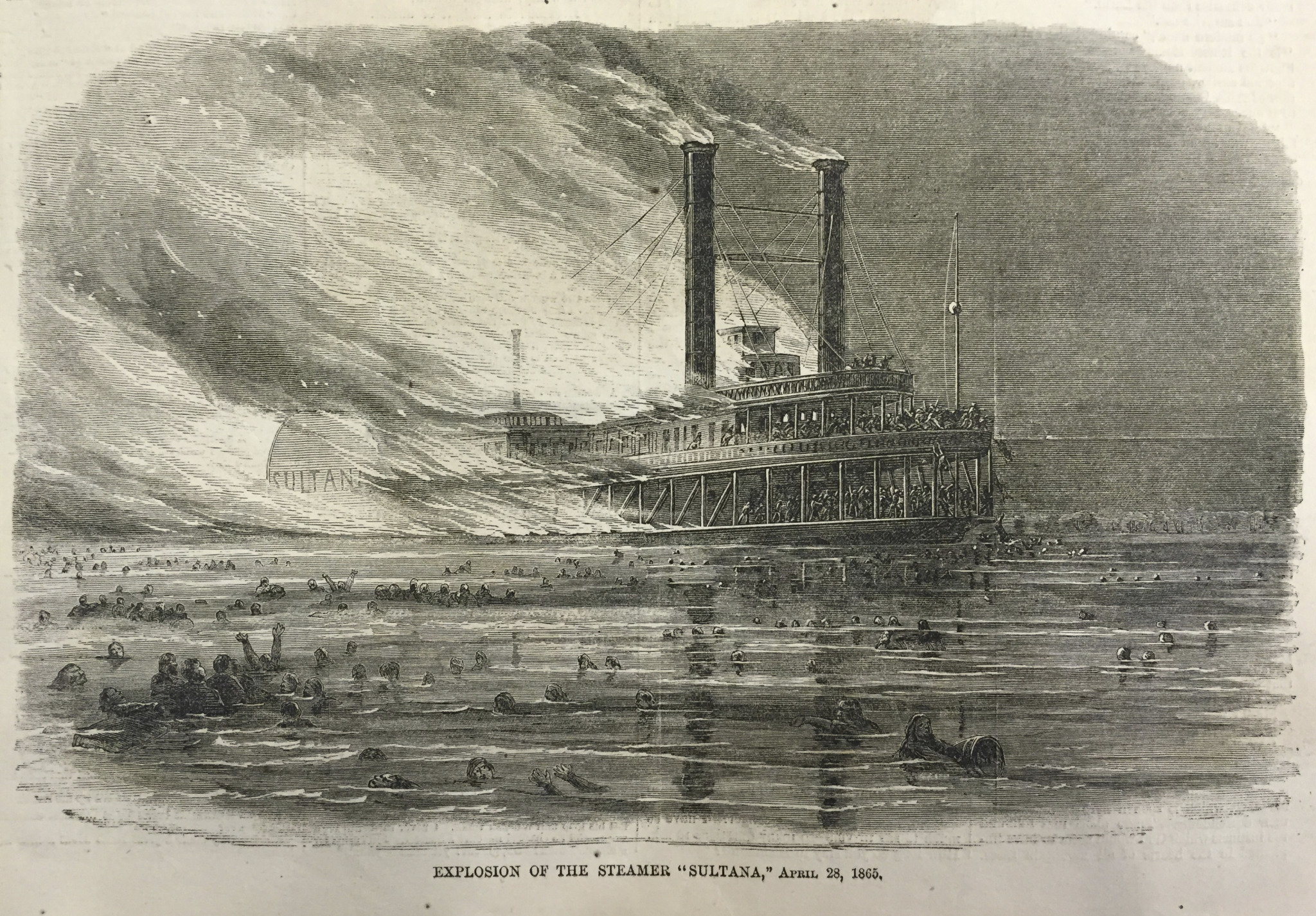
Sultana burning on the Mississippi River

Capts. Frederick Speed and George A. Williams were responsible for the proper boarding of soldiers. Speed advised Maj. Gen. Napoleon J.T. Dana that the number would not exceed 1,400 men. Speed and Williams both assured Dana that the load was not too large for the boat and that the men appeared comfortable and not overcrowded.

At 2 a.m. on April 27, 1865, the repaired boilers exploded, which instantly killed most of the passengers and crew and threw others into the Mississippi; the survivors jumped into the chilly river to escape the flames. As the article states:

Hot metal from the boilers and hot coals from the furnaces scattered on the decks, setting the ship afire. The explosion caused the smokestacks and decks to collapse. The weak and exhausted ex-prisoners of war jumped overboard, risking their lives in the Mississippi to avoid the raging fire. Drowning men covered the river as nearby boats tried to pick up the survivors. Many of the men floated downstream, in the direction of Memphis, clinging to anything they could find -- logs, parts of the steamer, furniture and any other floating object... All who had not been rescued had succumbed to the water or died trapped in the sunken steamer.

Dana and other authorities investigated the incident, but no one was ever brought to trial for it.

Lt. Gen. Grant, in a general order, released Maj. Gen. Dana from command of the Department of Mississippi, with orders to proceed to his residence for further orders. Maj. Gen. Warren succeeded Dana.

== Postwar ==
Dana resigned from the U.S. Army on May 27, 1865, and became a miner. In 1866 he was a general agent for the American-Russian Commercial Company of San Francisco, California. He worked for them until 1871, traveling in California, Alaska, and Washington, D.C.

In 1872 Dana began his lengthy connection with railroads. He served as superintendent of several railroads in Illinois, most notably of the Chicago, Burlington, and Quincy Railroad at Rock Island in 1878. He was then the commissioner in charge of Railroad Pools at St. Louis, Missouri from 1878 to 1881, and was president of the Montana and Union Railway Company in 1885.

Dana next served as chief of the Old War and Navy Division (U.S. Pension Department) in 1893, and was promoted to 1st Deputy Commissioner of Pensions by U.S. President Grover Cleveland in 1895. However, Dana was removed from this office by President William McKinley in 1897.

Due to a Special Act of the United States Congress in 1894, Dana was commissioned a captain the U.S. Army from August 2–11. He then placed on the retired list, enabling him to receive a pension. Dana lived out his final years in Washington, D.C. While visiting Portsmouth, New Hampshire, in the summer of 1905, he died of apoplexy and was buried in Portsmouth's Harmony Grove Cemetery.

An account of his experiences in the Mexican War was published in Monterrey is Ours! in 1990.

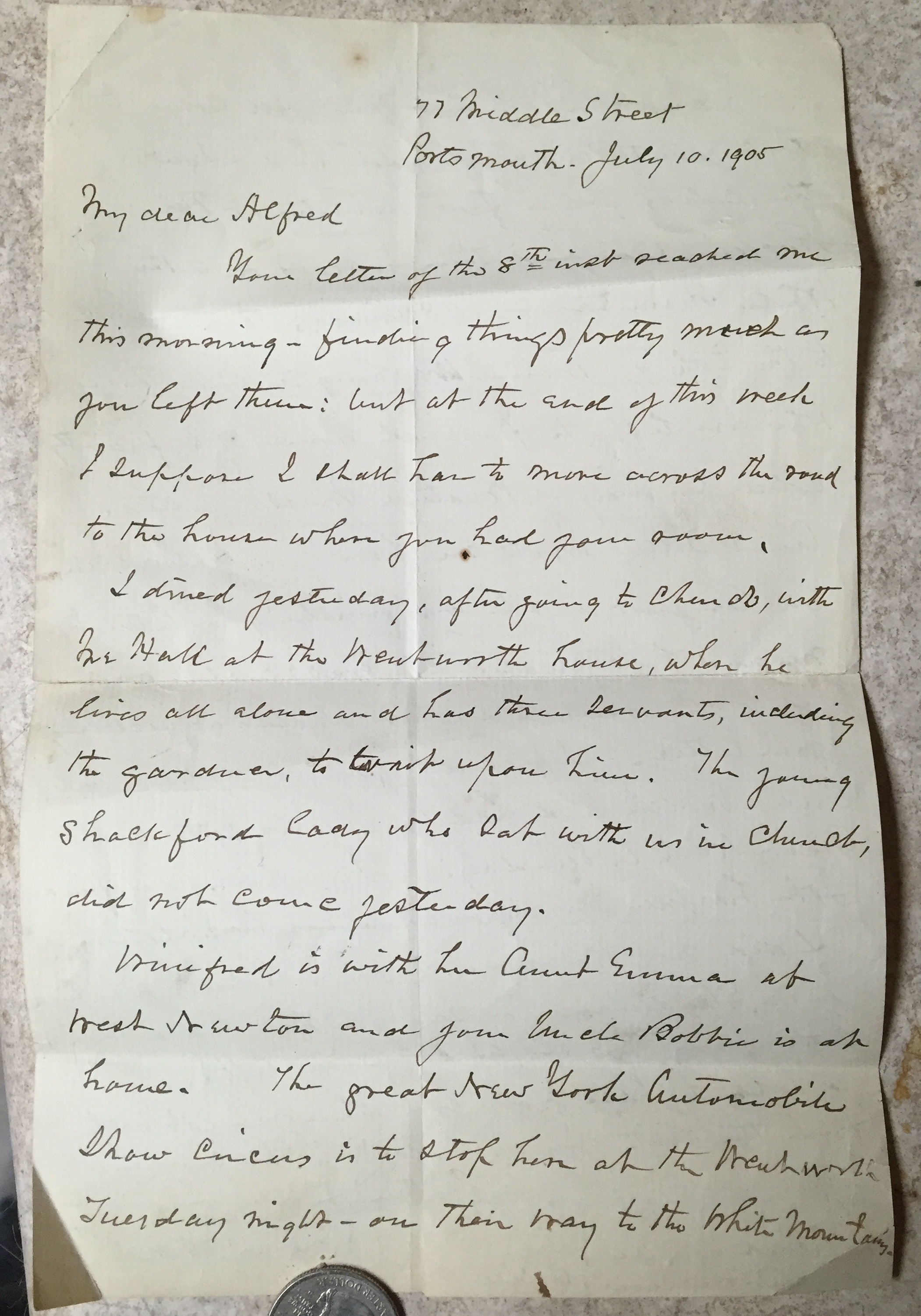
Personal, formal handwritten letter from Maj Gen NJT Dana (b.1822 d.1905) to his grandson Alfred L Dana b.1886 very shortly before the Maj's death. It is possible Alfred received the letter after the Maj's death.

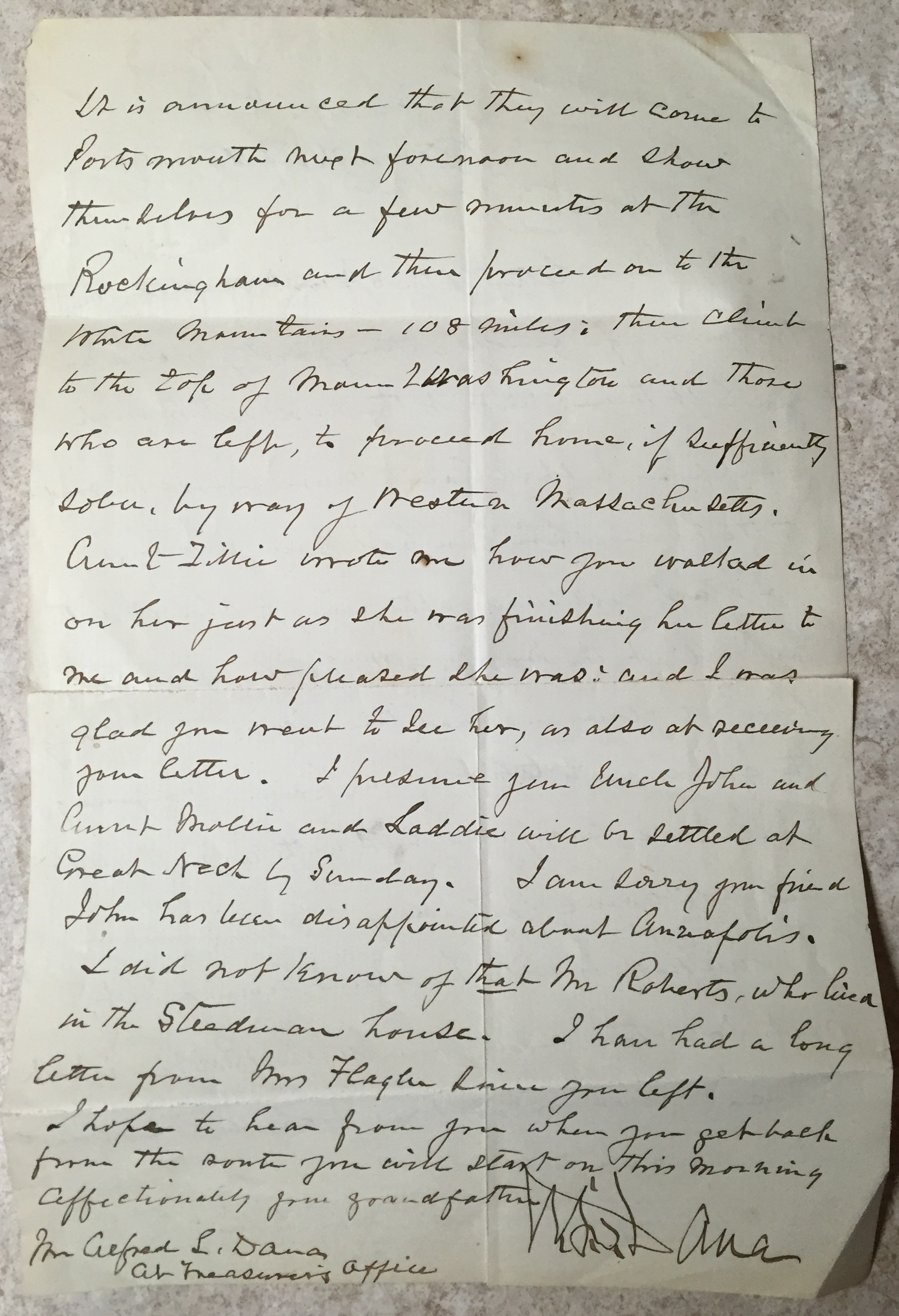
Personal, formal handwritten letter from Maj Gen NJT Dana (b.1822 d.1905) to his grandson Alfred L Dana b.1886 very shortly before the Maj's death. It is possible Alfred received the letter after the Maj's death.

== See also ==
- List of American Civil War generals (Union)
