= Battle of McGuire's Store =

1862 battle of the American Civil War

- Part of the American Civil War
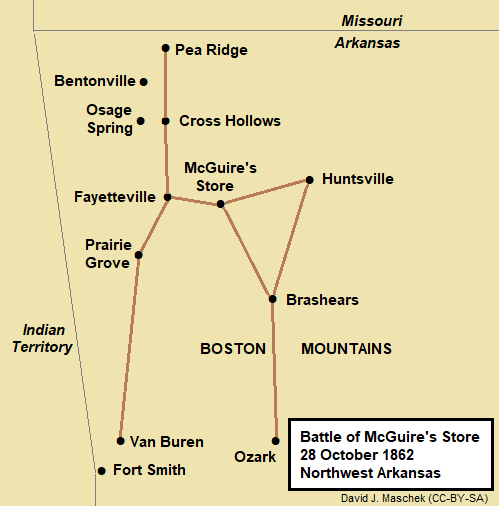
- Battle of McGuire's Store, 28 October 1862
Date	October 28, 1862
Location	Washington County, Arkansas 36°01′35″N 94°00′30″W
Result	Union victory

Belligerents
United States	(Confederate States of America) Confederate States

Commanders and leaders
John Schofield; Francis J. Herron	Thomas C. Hindman; Jesse L. Cravens

Units involved
3rd Division, Army of the Frontier	Cravens' Cavalry Brigade

Strength
c. 1,000	1,600

Casualties and losses
1 killed, 4 wounded	8 killed, 16 est. wounded

The Battle of McGuire's Store (28 October 1862) was fought at McGuire, Arkansas, near Elkins, between Union forces led by Brigadier General Francis J. Herron and Confederate forces under Colonel Jesse L. Cravens during the American Civil War. The skirmish was the result of an attempt by Union Brigadier General John Schofield to trap a body of Confederate cavalry reported to be at McGuire's Store. In the event, the operation failed when Herron's column took the wrong road and approached from the west instead of the north. Herron's well-equipped troops attacked Cravens' poorly armed and demoralized Texas cavalrymen and drove them off. This minor clash and other events caused Confederate Major General Thomas C. Hindman to suspend his intended advance to recover northwestern Arkansas and withdraw to the Arkansas River. Ironically, most of Schofield's soldiers also retreated to Missouri after the fight. Though the clash was minor, it marked one pulse of the ebb and flow of the war in northwest Arkansas.

== Background ==
Brigadier General Samuel R. Curtis' Union victory at the Battle of Pea Ridge on 7–8 March 1862, fought in northwest Arkansas, was a significant strategic success. It removed the Confederate threat to recapture central Missouri and possibly St. Louis. Major General Earl Van Dorn was so shaken by the defeat that, when ordered by General P. G. T. Beauregard, he transferred his entire Confederate army to the east bank of the Mississippi River, leaving Arkansas almost defenseless. In subsequent operations, Curtis' army nearly captured Little Rock and successfully occupied Helena in the eastern part of the state. After these events, the Trans-Mississippi Theater ceased having a major influence on the outcome of the war.

On 31 May 1862, Hindman reached Little Rock after being appointed by Beauregard to take command of the Trans-Mississippi District. He found that Van Dorn had removed everything of value to the war effort. Hindman found Arkansas in a state of near anarchy; he declared martial law and enforced conscription. His heavy-handed efforts produced results. Within ten weeks, Hindman created an army of 20,000 Confederate soldiers in Arkansas and kindled guerilla operations against Federal authority in Missouri. Because Hindman's exactions provoked the influential and wealthy classes to turn against him, President Jefferson Davis appointed Lieutenant General Theophilus H. Holmes to command the department, which was expanded to include Arkansas, Indian Territory, western Louisiana, Missouri, and Texas. Holmes arrived in Little Rock on 11 August, placing Hindman in charge of Arkansas, Indian Territory, and Missouri. In early September, Hindman led a motley force of 6,000 men from Fort Smith, Arkansas, into southwest Missouri. Holmes soon recalled Hindman to Little Rock for a strategy conference.

Remaining in charge of the Confederate forces in the field was Brigadier General James S. Rains, an alcoholic. Rains sent his cavalry to occupy the town of Newtonia, Missouri, but at this time, Federal forces were active. Brigadier General Frederick Salomon's brigade bumped into the Confederates and was mauled in the First Battle of Newtonia on 30 September 1862, losing 250 casualties. Retribution was swift. A Kansas division under Brigadier General James G. Blunt came from the north and more Union troops under Schofield approached from the east. On 4 October, Schofield and Blunt began bombarding Newtonia with artillery, causing a panicky flight of the Confederates from the town. Rains soon ordered his force to retreat to Arkansas.

== Operations ==
Pleased with his easy success, Schofield asked his superior Curtis, now a major general, for authorization to pursue the Confederates into Arkansas. Curtis gave Schofield permission and Union forces crossed into Arkansas on 17 October 1862. Five days earlier, Curtis created the Army of the Frontier with Schofield in overall command of the 1st Division under Blunt, the 2nd Division under Brigadier General James Totten, and the 3rd Division under Herron. Schofield's army had a nominal strength of 20,000 men, but probably only 14,000 were with the field army. (Note: Curtis was promoted major general on 21 March 1862. (Boatner, p. 215)) As Schofield's army advanced, its lines of supply became longer and more vulnerable. The army had two lines of supply, one running north to Fort Scott, Kansas, and another running northeast to Springfield, Missouri, and the railhead at Rolla. A 200-wagon supply train could take up to four weeks to reach the army and needed to be protected by considerable numbers of soldiers.

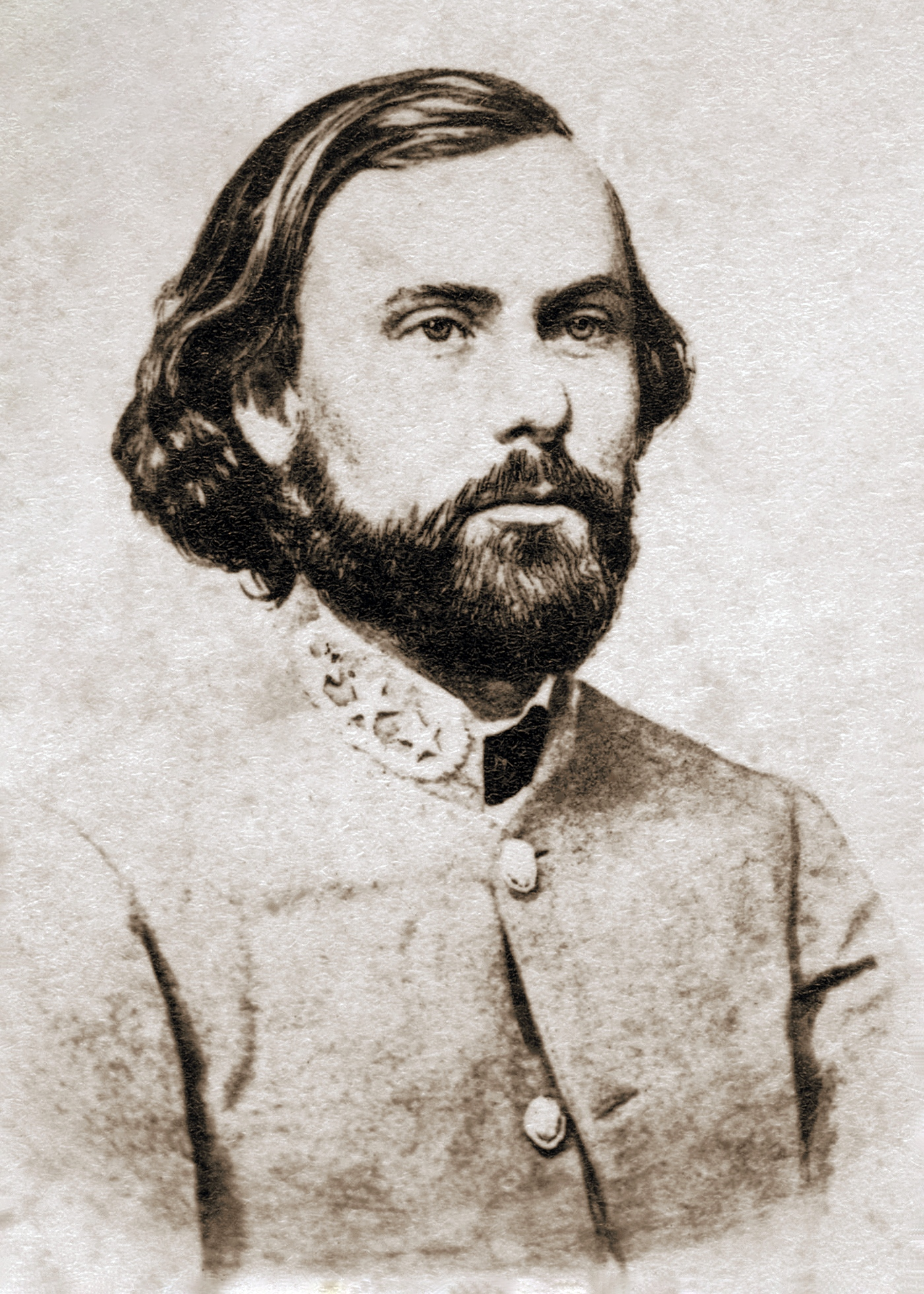
Thomas Hindman

Rains authorized Colonel Douglas H. Cooper to march to Fort Scott and destroy the Federal supplies there. However, Rains insisted on retaining four Texas cavalry regiments, leaving Cooper with only half as many soldiers as he wished. On 15 October 1862, Cooper marched west to rally his pro-Confederate native Americans. Schofield soon got news of Cooper's departure and late on 20 October he sent Blunt to deal with the threat. On 22 October, Blunt routed Cooper's force at the Battle of Old Fort Wayne. By this time, Hindman returned from Little Rock to find that Rains abandoned southwest Missouri and was now situated at Huntsville. Worse, Schofield's two divisions were reported to be advancing south from the direction of Pea Ridge. Upon this news, Hindman withdrew to Brashears, a strong defensive position on the northern slopes of the Boston Mountains. Union troops occupied Huntsville on the morning of 22 October. Schofield realized that he was at the limit of his long supply line; he could not advance any farther.

Believing that Hindman had fallen back to Ozark in the Arkansas River valley, Schofield abandoned Huntsville and pulled his units back. Totten's division went into camp at Osage Spring and Herron's division bivouacked at Cross Hollows. Osage Spring was 4 mi (6.4 km) south and Cross Hollows was 6 mi (9.7 km) southeast of Bentonville. Blunt proposed moving south to seize Fort Smith while Schofield wanted his troops to remain where they were to support the local pro-Union citizens. Schofield, who was in telegraphic communication with Curtis in St. Louis, was ordered to hold his two divisions ready to move east, leaving Blunt's division to defend the area. Curtis was under pressure from General-in-chief Henry Halleck to provide reinforcements for the impending Vicksburg campaign.

In fact, Hindman was still camped at Brashears and had been reinforced by an infantry brigade. Despite problems obtaining supplies, Hindman decided to re-occupy Fayetteville when he heard that Schofield had withdrawn northwards. After finding that Rains had gone on a drunken binge, Hindman sacked him and appointed Brigadier General John S. Marmaduke to lead his cavalry. On 26 October 1862, Hindman's cavalry moved north, and Marmaduke reported that no Federals were at Fayetteville. Jesse L. Cravens' cavalry brigade took position west of McGuire's Store while Colonel Joseph O. Shelby's cavalry brigade was farther east at Richland Creek. On 27 October, Hindman started his infantry marching from Brashears.

== Battle ==
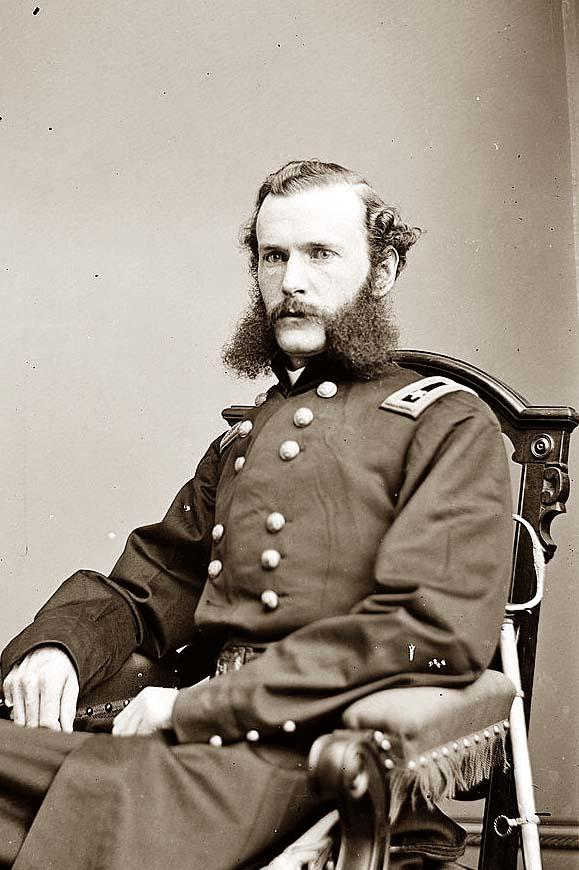
Francis Herron

Union scouts quickly detected the Confederates' forward lunge. Schofield hatched a plan to hit the Confederate force at McGuire's Store from both west and north. Totten and Schofield headed south from Osage Spring toward Fayetteville at dusk on 27 October with 3,000 troops, including infantry, cavalry, and artillery. After marching on Elm Springs Road, Totten's cavalry reached Fayetteville the next morning, but the infantry was many hours behind. Because of a staff blunder, Herron received his orders late that night. The only available units were two battalions of Colonel James O. Gower's 1st Iowa Cavalry Regiment, one battalion of Major James M. Hubbard's 1st Missouri Cavalry Regiment, and two battalions of Colonel John F. Phillips' 7th Missouri Militia Cavalry Regiment, fewer than 1,000 troopers. Since Herron's column included no infantry or artillery, it was able to march 25 mi (40 km) during the night. The column set out on Telegraph Road, but turned east at Robinson's Crossroads, guided by local pro-Union citizens. (Note: Every cavalry regiment was organized into 12 companies, while infantry regiments had 10 companies. (Boatner, p. 612) Cavalry regiments had three majors. Each battalion was formed from four companies/troops. (Coggins, p. 48))

Herron's horsemen brushed aside Confederate pickets at Oxford Bend on the Middle Fork of the White River about 5 mi (8.0 km) north of McGuire's Store. At dawn, Herron's column was confronted by Cravens' brigade of Texas cavalry. This formation consisted of the 20th Texas Cavalry Regiment under Colonel Thomas C. Bass, 22nd Texas Cavalry Regiment under Major Robert D. Stone, 31st Texas Cavalry Regiment under Colonel Trezevant C. Hawpe, and 34th Texas Cavalry Regiment under Colonel Almerine M. Alexander. The Confederates held a position on the far bank of the White River with 1,200 dismounted men while 400 more were in the rear, holding the horses. Colonel William R. Bradfute, who previously led the brigade, wrote that the soldiers were "thoroughly demoralized". One of Hawpe's cavalrymen complained that his regiment was armed with shotguns that, "will hardly stick a ball into butter at the distance of sixty paces". (Note: Shea only named the Texas cavalry regiment commanders. The regiment numbers were listed by Oates. (Oates, pp. 176–177))

Herron led 700 dismounted Union cavalrymen (not counting horse-holders) forward to the White River. While the two sides exchanged fire, causing few casualties, Herron dimly began to realize that he was facing east toward Huntsville. In the confusing tangle of roads at night, his column had taken the wrong direction. Since he was supposed to attack from the north, the intended two-pronged attack had already failed because Totten was behind him. After a half hour of skirmishing, without orders, Phillips ordered his regiment to charge and soon the men from all three Union regiments splashed across the stream and the Texans fled. Cravens managed to reform his soldiers in a second position at their camp, 1 mi (1.6 km) to the rear, while asking Marmaduke for assistance. After another brief firefight, the Texans again mounted their horses and rode away, abandoning 12 wagons and other gear. Herron sent one battalion of the 1st Iowa to chase the Texans while the rest of his men plundered the camp. When the troopers of the 1st Iowa encountered Shelby's brigade deployed across the road to Huntsville, Herron decided it was time to leave and he ordered his troops to march west to Fayetteville.

== Aftermath ==
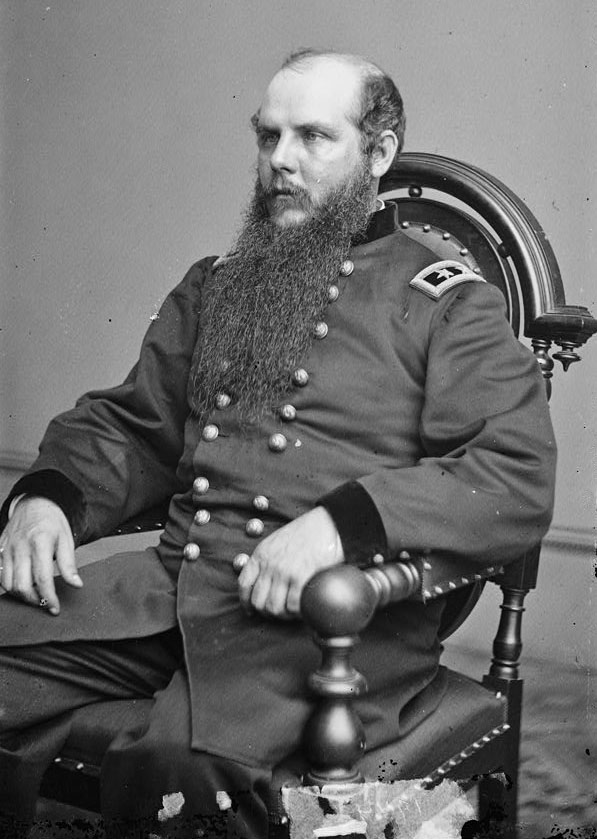
John Schofield

In the skirmish, Herron's force sustained losses of 1 man killed and 4 wounded, while 8 Confederates lost their lives with probably twice that number wounded. About 2 mi (3.2 km) from Fayetteville, Herron met Schofield's and Totten's column marching east. After Herron explained the situation to Schofield, he ordered his tired troopers back to camp at Cross Hollows. Meanwhile, Schofield continued east and deployed Totten's troops opposite Shelby's defense line. When Hindman heard the gunfire from the McGuire's Store skirmish, he halted his infantry column and rode to where Marmaduke and Shelby were posted. Hindman had hoped to occupy Fayetteville against light opposition, but Union line that he observed was clearly strong. When he got a mistaken report that Federal troops were moving past his left flank, Hindman ordered his troops to march back to Brashears.

On 29 October 1862, Hindman ordered his force to retreat from Brashears. After an exhausting 3-day march across the Boston Mountains, the Confederates reached a campsite near Ozark. They were soon supplied with new clothing, food, forage, gear, and ammunition via steamboats on the Arkansas River. They were also reinforced by Brigadier General Mosby Monroe Parsons' brigade. Hindman reported to Holmes that he was forced to withdraw due to lack of supplies for his troops. He admitted to Holmes that his Union opponents reacted, "more rapidly than I had anticipated". On the same day that Hindman retreated from Brashears, Schofield responded to a rumor that the Confederates were advancing. He pulled his divisions back to their former camps, Totten's at Osage Spring and Herron's at Cross Hollows. In addition, he ordered Blunt's division to take a position to the west of Bentonville. When Federal scouts reported that Hindman had indeed departed from Brashears, Schofield prepared to move the 2nd and 3rd Divisions back to Missouri. On 4 November, Totten's and Herron's troops began a forced march to Springfield. On 6 November, Schofield's small army was positioned with Blunt's division (6,200 men) in Arkansas and Totten's (4,600 men) and Herron's (2,800) divisions near Springfield. The next action was the Battle of Cane Hill on 28 November 1862 between Blunt's division and Marmaduke's cavalry.

== Notes ==
Footnotes

Citations
