= Army of the Frontier =

Army that fought in the American Civil War

- Active: October 1, 1862 — June 9, 1863
- Country: United States of America
- Branch: United States Army
- Engagements: American Civil War * Battle of Old Fort Wayne * Battle of McGuire's Store * Battle of Cane Hill * Battle of Prairie Grove * Van Buren raid * Battle of Chalk Bluff

The Army of the Frontier was a Union army that served in the Trans-Mississippi Theater during the American Civil War. The army was formed by consolidating existing formations commanded by Brigadier Generals James G. Blunt and John M. Schofield on October 1, 1862, shortly after the First Battle of Newtonia. This army was originally known as the Army of Southwestern Missouri but was renamed to the Army of the Frontier on October 12. Advancing into Arkansas and the Indian Territory, portions of the army were engaged at the Battle of Old Fort Wayne and the Battle of McGuire's Store in late October. Two divisions of the army then returned to Missouri, in preparation to be transferred to the Vicksburg campaign, while the third division, under Blunt, remained in Arkansas and won the Battle of Cane Hill on November 28. In response to a Confederate offensive against Blunt's division, the other two divisions returned from Missouri in time to, along with Blunt's division, repulse the Confederate offensive at the Battle of Prairie Grove on December 7. In late December, the army raided the Confederate supply depot at Van Buren, Arkansas. After the raid, the divisions of the Army of the Frontier were scattered to different points in Missouri and Arkansas. A portion of the army was engaged in the Battle of Chalk Bluff in May 1863. On June 2, most of the men from two divisions of the army were sent to the operations against Vicksburg. The remaining division of the army was assigned to the District of the Border on June 9, and the Army of the Frontier ceased to exist.

== History ==
=== Background ===
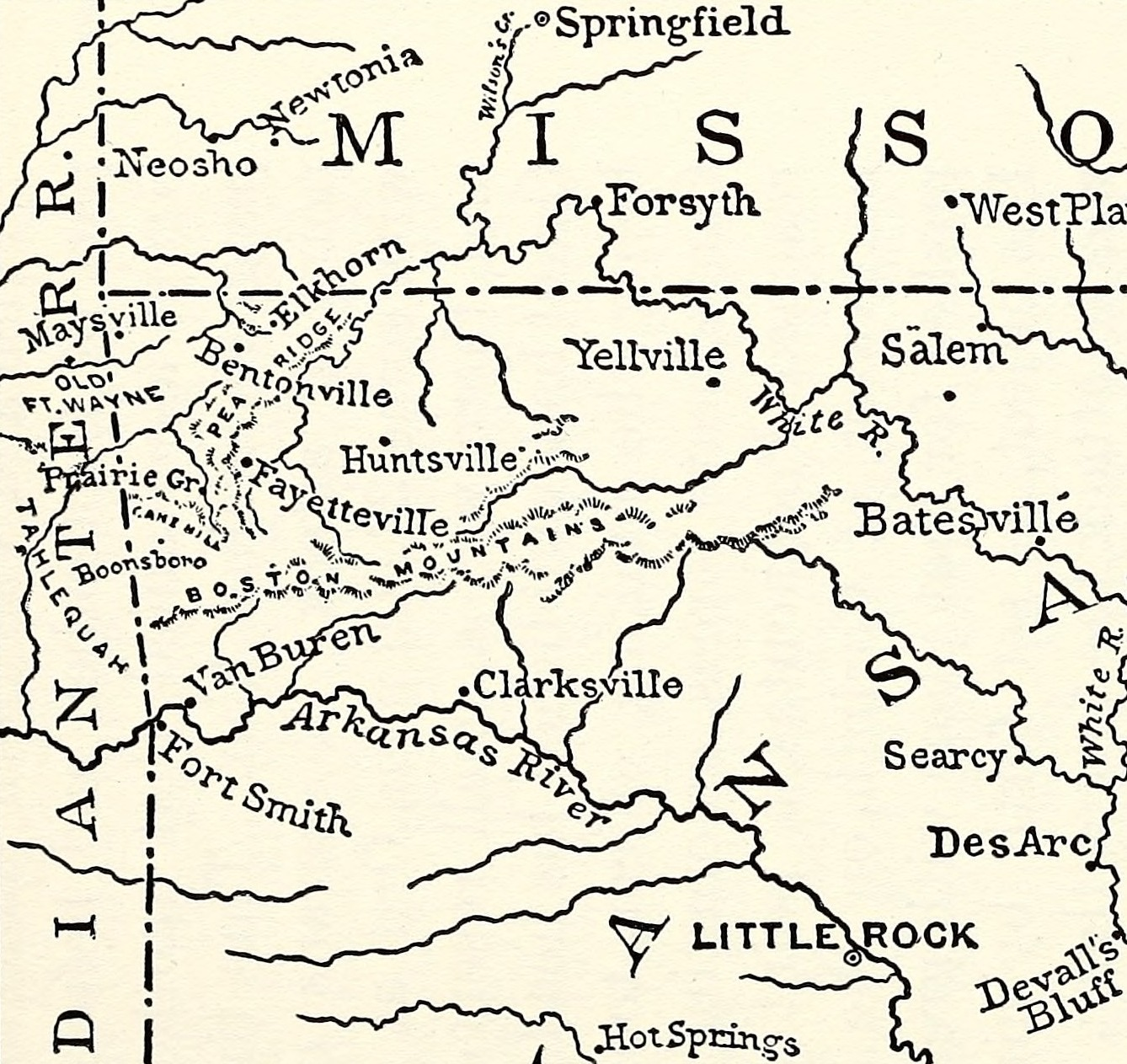
A map of southwestern Missouri, northwestern Arkansas, and the eastern edge of the Indian Territory: the regions where the Army of the Frontier operated in late 1862

During the American Civil War, on March 7 and 8, 1862, the Union Army of the Southwest defeated the Confederate Army of the West at the Battle of Pea Ridge in northwestern Arkansas. This victory secured control of Missouri for the Union and opened the path for the Union to eventually capture Arkansas. After Pea Ridge, the Confederate commander, Major General Earl Van Dorn moved his army east of the Mississippi River, stripping Arkansas of most of its Confederate troops and military supplies. On May 31, command of the Confederate Trans-Mississippi District was given to Major General Thomas C. Hindman, who rebuilt Confederate strength in Arkansas, as well as outbursts of pro-Confederate activity in Missouri. However, Hindman had outraged many prominent Arkansas civilians, and he was replaced by Theophilus H. Holmes, who was promoted to lieutenant general and sent to Arkansas.

Hindman moved about 6,000 men into southwestern Missouri in early September. The Union forces in Missouri were commanded by Brigadier General John M. Schofield, as the District of Missouri in the Department of the Mississippi. The neighboring Department of Kansas was commanded by Brigadier General James G. Blunt. In response to Hindman's incursion, on September 19, the Union recreated the Department of the Missouri, which contained the states of Missouri, Arkansas, Kansas, the Indian Territory, and the city of Alton, Illinois. Major General Samuel Ryan Curtis, the victor of Pea Ridge, was placed in charge of the new department, which it was hoped would unify Union leadership in the region. Curtis took command on September 24, and on September 26 sent Schofield to Springfield, Missouri, to command Union operations there. Blunt and his force, known as the Army of Kansas, was sent to join forces with Schofield, who commanded two divisions, which were led by Brigadier Generals James Totten and Francis J. Herron.

=== Formation ===
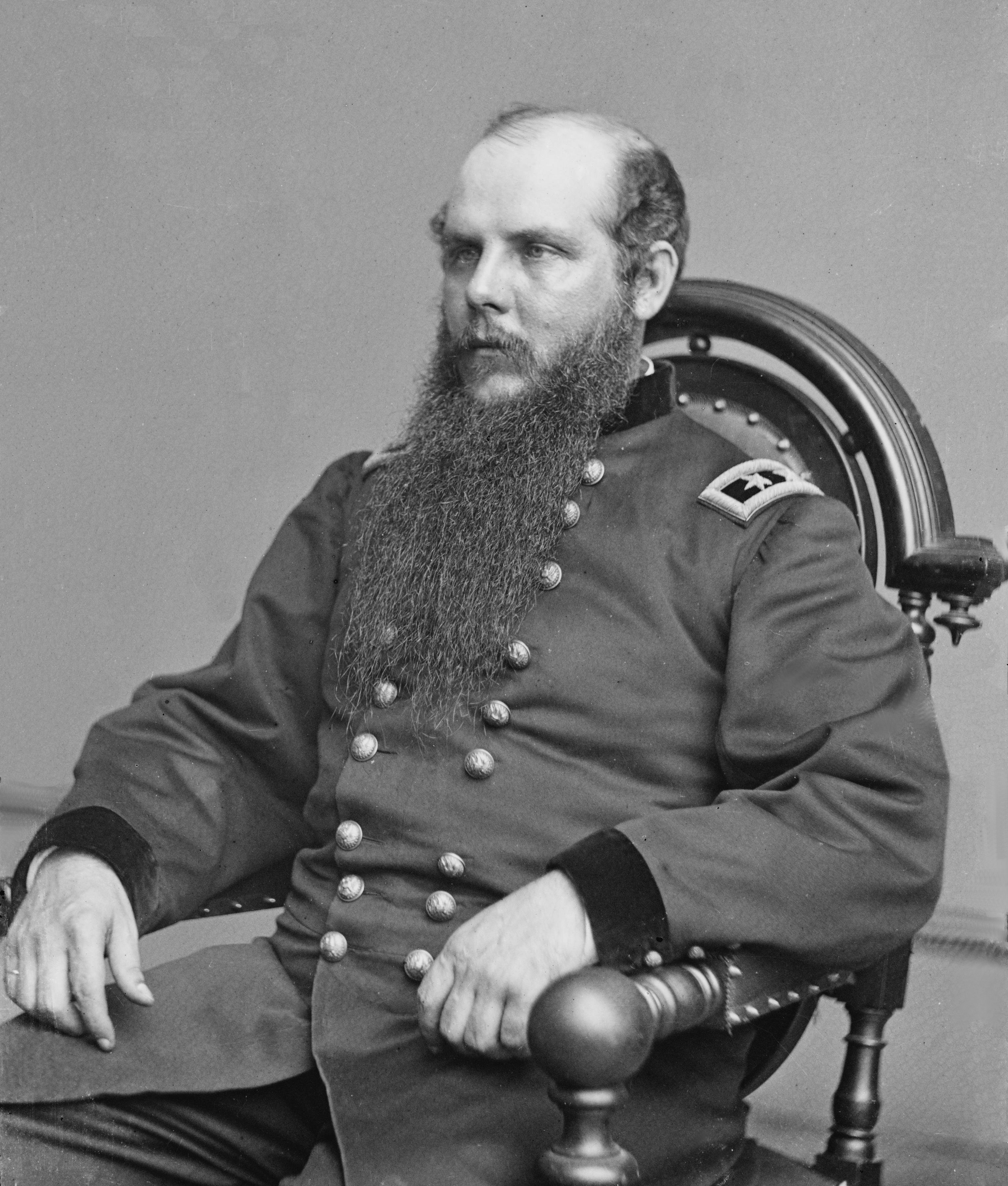
John M. Schofield commanded the Army of the Frontier for much of its existence

Part of Blunt's army was defeated on September 30 in the First Battle of Newtonia. The next day, the combined forces of Blunt and Schofield, with Schofield in overall command, was named the Army of Southwestern Missouri. Two days later, Blunt and Totten's troops were reported to be stationed at Sarcoxie, Missouri, with Herron's division on the Cassville Road. On October 4, Blunt and Totten moved towards Newtonia, and the Confederates abandoned the town and fell back into Arkansas. The Army of Southwestern Missouri was renamed the Army of the Frontier on October 12; on that day Blunt's division was at Keetsville, Missouri, and Totten and Herron at Cassville. Blunt's division was given the designation of the First Division, Totten's the Second Division, and Herron's the Third Division, although Blunt's division was commonly known as the Kansas Division and the other two as the Missouri Divisions.

Advancing, the Army of the Frontier entered Confederate territory on October 17, where the men camped on the old Pea Ridge battlefield, with army headquarters in the Elkhorn Tavern. The army's communication and supply lines were kept over two routes: Blunt was supplied from Fort Leavenworth, Kansas; Kansas City, Missouri; and Fort Scott, Kansas; while the other two divisions were supplied through St. Louis, Missouri; Rolla, Missouri; and Springfield. Confederate Colonel Douglas H. Cooper and part of the Confederate cavalry were preparing for an offensive against Fort Scott. James S. Rains and the rest of the Confederate force moved in the opposite direction. Schofield decided to split the Army of the Frontier, sending Blunt and two of his three brigades after Cooper, while Totten and Herron pursued Rains. Both wings of the army left the Pea Ridge area late on October 20. Blunt defeated Cooper on October 22 in the Battle of Old Fort Wayne. Totten and Herron reached Huntsville, Arkansas, that same day. Schofield called off the pursuit, having reached the end of his logistical framework, and believing the Confederates had withdrawn enough to no longer be a threat, withdrew Totten and Herron in the direction of Fayetteville, Arkansas.

=== Prairie Grove ===
Blunt wished to attack Fort Smith, Arkansas, while Schofield wanted Blunt to be stationed in the northern portion of the Indian Territory. Schofield further wanted to keep the army's other two divisions in northwestern Arkansas. Schofield was able to easily communicate with Curtis because of a rebuilt telegraph line along the Telegraph Road, and Curtis wanted Blunt to remain stationed along the Indian Territory/Arkansas border and for the other two divisions to be withdrawn back into Missouri, so that they could be transferred to service in the Vicksburg campaign. Totten's division was at Osage Spring, and Herron's at Cross Hollow, Arkansas. On October 27, Schofield went to Osage Spring to begin the process of withdrawing the two divisions into Missouri, but learned that Confederate cavalry was in the Fayetteville area. Schofield planned a converging attack on the Confederates with Totten and Herron's men, but the plan did not go through as expected and Herron's men fought and won the Battle of McGuire's Store on October 28.

After occupying Fayetteville, Schofield panicked at rumors of a Confederate advance and withdrew from the city. Blunt's division moved to a position where it would better support Schofield's two divisions, with the Army of the Frontier on October 31 being arrayed with Totten at Osage Springs, Herron at Cross Hollow, and Blunt near Bentonville, Arkansas. On November 3, Blunt and Schofield held a conference with Curtis at Elkhorn Tavern over the telegraph line, where Schofield asked for and received permission to withdraw back to Missouri. Beginning on the next day, Totten and Herron's divisions made a forced march back to Springfield; Schofield had been alarmed by false rumors of a Confederate campaign against that city. November 6 saw Blunt with his division still in Arkansas with 6,200 men, Herron camped on Crane Creek with 2,800 men, and Totten on the Spring River with 4,600 men. Blunt's men were 15 miles (24 km) south of Maysville, Arkansas, at Lindsey's Prairie. As of November, the Army of the Frontier was organized with three brigades in Blunt's division, three in Totten's division, and two in Herron's, although one of Totten's brigades remained in Springfield and did not participate in field maneuvers.

The plan was for Totten and Herron to spend only a little time at Springfield, and then move east to Helena, Arkansas, to join the Vicksburg operations. Schofield was ill, so Curtis ordered Totten to take his division and Herron's to Cape Girardeau, Missouri, as part of the transfer; the two divisions left Ozark, Missouri, on November 14. Confederate cavalry under Brigadier General John S. Marmaduke moved into the Cane Hill, Arkansas, area in early November; the threat posed by this movement to Blunt led Totten's eastwards movement to be cancelled. By November 18, Totten's divisions were back at Cassville. After receiving news that Marmaduke had withdrawn, Schofield turned over command to Blunt and left for St. Louis on November 20. Totten, who had unpopular with his men and who had a drinking problem, was ordered to St. Louis for court martial duty on November 27. He was replaced as divisional commander by Colonel Daniel Huston Jr. Herron's division camped along Wilson's Creek, with Huston's division 12 miles (19 km) to the south.

Also on November 27, Blunt left Lindsey's Prairie to confront Marmaduke's Confederates. The next day, his men defeated the Confederates in the Battle of Cane Hill; Marmaduke fell back towards Van Buren, Arkansas while Blunt remained at Cane Hill. Blunt's division was now over 100 miles (160 km) from the rest of the Army of the Frontier, but only about 35 miles (56 km) from the Confederates. Hindman and three of his subordinate commanders developed a plan to attack and destroy Blunt's division while it was still separated from the rest of the Army of the Frontier. Blunt learned of the Confederate offensive late on December 2, the day before the Confederate actually began their movement. He informed Curtis of the situation and requested that the two divisions camped in Missouri join him.

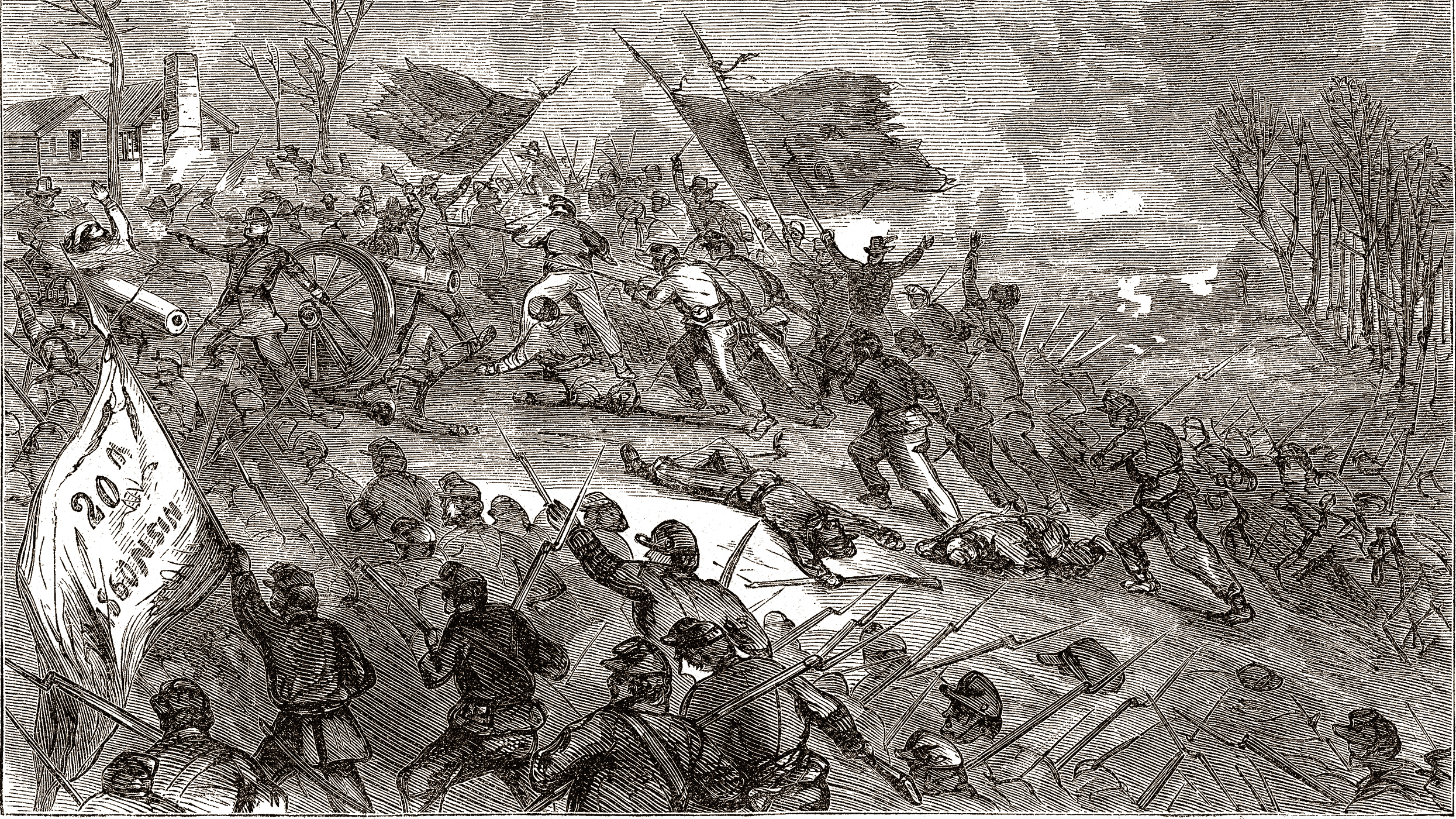
An 1860s illustration of troops from the Army of the Frontier assaulting a Confederate position during the Battle of Prairie Grove

Herron placed the two Missouri divisions on the road on the afternoon of December 3. By December 6, Herron's two divisions had reached Fayetteville; late that same day contact was made between the forces of Hindman and Blunt. When Hindman learned that Herron's men had arrived in the area, he changed his plans to defeat Herron first, and then attack Blunt. In the Battle of Prairie Grove on December 7, Herron attacked Hindman and was repulsed; a Confederate counterattack met the same fate. Blunt arrived later in the day on the Confederate left and another series of attacks by each side failed to be decisive. Hindman withdrew his men during the night. Two days after the battle, the Army of the Frontier again split up, with Blunt's division going to Rhea's Mill, Arkansas, with the other two divisions remaining on the field.

On December 23, Blunt was informed that Schofield was on his way back to resume command of the army. Having learned that the Confederates were withdrawing from the Fort Smith area, Blunt decided to make one final offensive before the more cautious Schofield arrived. The Army of the Frontier began the Van Buren raid on December 27. Two days later, while the Army of the Frontier was on its way back from the raid, Schofield arrived, but declined to take command until after the army had returned from the raid.

=== Later activities ===
Schofield resumed command on January 1, 1863, and the Army of the Frontier withdrew from Arkansas. Blunt's division returned to Kansas, and the other two divisions to Missouri; the three divisions would never serve as a whole again. In January 1863, Blunt went to Fort Leavenworth to oversee the District of Kansas, and Colonel William Weer took command of his division. By the end of that month, John G. Clark was in command of Totten's old division, and James O. Gower led Herron's former division. Schofield's headquarters was at Springfield. By the end of the following month, Washington F. Geiger was in command of the Third Division. In March, the two Missouri divisions were transferred to southeastern Missouri, in preparation for an expected incursion by Marmaduke's cavalry. On March 30, Schofield was reassigned to command the District of Southwestern Missouri, and Herron took command of the Army of the Frontier. As of that date, the First Division was at Carrollton, Arkansas, the Second Division (now under the command of Dudley Wickersham) at Elk Creek, Missouri, and the Third Division at Rolla, Missouri. Brigadier General William Vandever took command of the Second Division on April 9.

Marmaduke began an expedition into Missouri on April 18. Vandever responded by moving his division to Pilot Knob, Missouri, on April 23, and then to Fredericktown two days later. Late on April 26, Vandever's men fought with Marmaduke's troopers at Jackson. On May 1 and 2, the Union troops battled Marmaduke's men at the crossing of the St. Francis River at Chalk Bluff, Arkansas; the Confederates escaped across the river. By the end of April, the First Division was at Houston, Missouri, the Second Division at Pilot Knob, and the Third Division at Lake Spring, Missouri. The army's headquarters was at Rolla. Brigadier General Thomas Ewing Jr. took effective command of the First Division on May 13, and was ordered to send the Kansas units back to that state. On June 2, Herron and all of the infantry regiments from the Second and Third Divisions, along with two artillery batteries, were sent to reinforce the Union campaign ongoing at Vicksburg, Mississippi; these units became the Second Division of the XIII Corps in the Army of the Tennessee in July. The Second and Third Divisions ceased to exist at this time. On June 9, Ewing's division was assigned to the District of the Border, and Blunt was assigned that day to command the District of the Frontier. The Army of the Frontier ceased to exist.

== Sources ==
- Shea, William L. (1998). "Prairie Grove, Arkansas". In Kennedy, Frances H. (ed.). The Civil War Battlefield Guide (2nd ed.). Boston/New York: Houghton Mifflin. pp. 140–144. ISBN 978-0-395-74012-5.
- Shea, William L. (2009). Fields of Blood: The Prairie Grove Campaign. Chapel Hill, North Carolina: University of North Carolina Press. ISBN 978-0-8078-3315-5.
- Shea, William L.; Hess, Earl J. (1992). Pea Ridge: Civil War Campaign in the West. Chapel Hill: University of North Carolina Press. ISBN 0-8078-4669-4.
- Shea, William L.; Hess, Earl J. (1998). "Pea Ridge, Arkansas". In Kennedy, Frances H. (ed.). The Civil War Battlefield Guide (2nd ed.). Boston/New York: Houghton Mifflin. pp. 34–37. ISBN 978-0-395-74012-5.
- Welcher, Frank J. (1993). The Union Army, 1861–1865: Organization and Operations. Vol. II: The Western Theater. Bloomington, Indiana: Indiana University Press. ISBN 0-253-36454-X.
