= Cabanal, Arkansas =

Community in Arkansas, US

Coordinates: 36°16′42″N 93°31′56″W

Cabanal is a community in Carroll County in northwest Arkansas, United States. The community is located on Arkansas Highway 21, south of Berryville and north of Metalton. The site is along a north flowing tributary to Osage Creek below and west of Gage Mountain at an elevation of 1,306 ft (398 m).

The community post office was established in 1898 and closed in 1955.

== Transportation ==
While there is no fixed-route transit service in Cabanal, intercity bus service is provided by Jefferson Lines in nearby Berryville.
