= 20th Cavalry =

20th Cavalry may refer to:

== Regiments and companies ==
- 20th Cavalry Regiment (United States)
- 20th Corps Cavalry Regiment
- 20th (Fife and Forfarshire Light Horse) Company, Imperial Yeomanry
- 20th Hussars

=== American Civil War regiments ===
==== Union Army ====
- 20th Pennsylvania Cavalry Regiment

==== Confederate Army ====
- 20th Arkansas Cavalry, a name occasionally used for the 20th Arkansas Infantry Regiment
- 20th Texas Cavalry Regiment
- 20th Virginia Cavalry Regiment

== Other uses ==
- Le Vingtième de cavalerie (The Twentieth Cavalry), the 27th comic album of the Belgian Lucky Luke series

== See also ==
- 20th Regiment (disambiguation)
- 20th (disambiguation)
