= Metalton, Arkansas =

Unincorporated community in Arkansas, US

Coordinates: 36°13′23″N 93°31′48″W

Metalton is an unincorporated community in southern Carroll County, Arkansas, United States. The community is located on Arkansas Highway 21 between Cabanal to the north and Omega to the south. The communities of Rudd and Gobbler lie to the southeast along Arkansas Highway 103. The community lies near the intersection of Piney Creek with its tributary Cedar Creek. The community sits at an elevation of 1,345 ft (410 m).

The Metalton post office was established in 1898 and served until 1967.
