= Daniel Huston =

Daniel Huston may refer to:

- Daniel Huston Jr. (1824–1884), United States Army officer
- Danny Huston (born 1962), American-British actor, director, and screenwriter

== See also ==
- Dan Houston (born 1997), Australian footballer
- Danny Houston, Hollyoaks character
