= 25th Ohio Independent Light Artillery Battery =

25th Ohio Battery
- Active: August 27, 1862, to December 12, 1865
- Country: United States
- Allegiance: Union
- Branch: Artillery
- Engagements: First Battle of Newtonia; Battle of Prairie Grove

25th Ohio Battery was an artillery battery that served in the Union Army during the American Civil War.

== Service ==
The 25th Ohio Battery was organized at Fort Scott, Kansas, from a detachment of men from the 2nd Ohio Cavalry on August 27, 1862. The initial designation of the battery was 3rd Kansas Independent Battery (not be confused with the 3rd Independent Battery Kansas Light Artillery), but was officially changed to 25th Ohio Battery February 17, 1863. The battery was mustered in for three years service under the command of Captain Julius L. Hadley.

The battery was attached to 1st Brigade, 1st Division, Army of the Frontier, October 1862 to June 1863. Artillery, Cavalry Division, District Southeast Missouri, Department of the Missouri, to August 1863. Artillery, 1st Cavalry Division, Arkansas Expedition, to January 1864. Columbus, Ohio, to April 1864. Artillery, 3rd Division, VII Corps, Department of Arkansas, to May 1864. Artillery, 1st Division, VII Corps, to February 1865. Artillery, Cavalry Division, VII Corps, to July 1865. Garrison Artillery, Little Rock, Arkansas, Department of the Arkansas, to December 1865.

The 25th Ohio Battery mustered out of service on December 12, 1865, at Columbus, Ohio.

== Detailed service ==
Blount's Campaign in Missouri and Arkansas September 17-December 10, 1862. Expedition to Sarcoxie September 17–25. Reconnaissance to Newtonia September 29–31. Action at Newtonia September 30. Occupation of Newtonia October 4. Cane Hill November 29. Battle of Prairie Grove, Ark., December 7. Expedition to Van Buren, Ark., December 27–29. March over Ozark and Boston Mountains to Cane Creek, Mo., January 1–10, 1863. Moved to Camp Solomon February 27. Campaign against Marmaduke March and April. Ordered to Rolla, Mo., May 22 and refitting until June 26. Moved to Pilot Knob, Mo., June 26, and reported to General Davidson. Expedition against Price and Marmaduke in Arkansas. March to Clarendon, Ark., on White River July 1-August 8. Grand Prairie August 17. Steele's Expedition against Little Rock August 18-September 10. Bayou Metoe or Reed's Bridge August 27. Bayou Fourche and capture of Little Rock September 10. Duty at Little Rock until November. Ferry's Ford October 7. Duty at Benton, Pine Bluff, and Little Rock until January 1864. Reconnaissance from Little Rock December 5–13, 1863. Reenlisted January 3, 1864. Moved to Columbus, Ohio, January 21–29. Return to Little Rock, Ark., March 17, and garrison duty there at Fort Steele until December 1865.

== Casualties ==
The battery lost a total of 23 enlisted men during service, all due to disease.

== Commanders ==
- Captain Julius L. Hadley

== See also ==
- List of Ohio Civil War units
- Ohio in the Civil War
