= Rudd, Arkansas =

Unincorporated community in Arkansas, US

Coordinates: 36°12′49″N 93°29′10″W

Rudd also known as Piney is an unincorporated community in southern Carroll County, Arkansas, United States. The community is located among mountain peaks along Piney Creek on Arkansas Highway 103. Gobbler lies to the southeast and Metalton lies to the northwest. The site is at an elevation of 1,447 ft (441 m).

A post office named Piney was opened at the site in 1873, but was closed and replaced by the Rudd post office in 1892 and remained in operation until 1957.
