= Piney Creek (Kings River tributary) =

Stream in the American state of Arkansas

Piney Creek is a stream in southern Carroll County of the U.S. state of Arkansas. It is a tributary to the Kings River.

The stream headwaters arise near 36°11′40″N 93°27′08″W at an elevation of approximately 1660 feet. The source area is on the southwest flank of Usery Mountain just north of Arkansas Highway 68 about one half mile northeast of Gobbler. The stream flows northwest parallel to Arkansas Highway 103 past Rudd and Metalton. It passes under Arkansas Highway 21 at Metalton and continues to the northwest to enter the Kings River at the Carroll-Madison county line at 36°16′02″N 93°38′07″W and an elevation of 1132 feet.

Piney Creek was so named for the pine timber along its course.
