= 22nd Texas Cavalry Regiment =

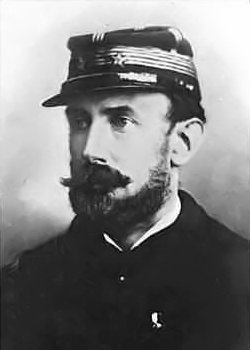
- The regiment was assigned to Camille de Polignac's brigade in the Red River campaign.
- Active: Late 1861 – May 1865
- Country: Confederate States of America
- Allegiance: Confederate States of America, Texas
- Branch: Confederate States Army
- Type: Cavalry, Infantry
- Size: Regiment
- Nickname: 1st Indian-Texas Regiment
- Engagements: American Civil War; First Battle of Newtonia (1862); Battle of McGuire's Store (1862); Battle of Prairie Grove (1862); Battle of Mansfield (1864); Battle of Pleasant Hill (1864); Battle of Yellow Bayou (1864)

Commanders
- Notable commanders: Robert H. Taylor

The 22nd Texas Cavalry Regiment was a unit of mounted volunteers from Texas that fought in the Confederate States Army during the American Civil War. The regiment first began organizing in late 1861 and by July 1862, it moved to the Indian Territory. The unit fought at Newtonia and McGuire's Store in fall 1862 and was dismounted soon after. The regiment fought as infantry at Prairie Grove in December 1862. It traveled to Louisiana in March 1863 where it joined a brigade led by Camille de Polignac. In 1864 the regiment fought at Mansfield, Pleasant Hill, and Yellow Bayou during the Red River Campaign. In March 1865 the regiment marched to Texas where it disbanded in May.

== See also ==
- List of Texas Civil War Confederate units
