= 31st Texas Cavalry Regiment =

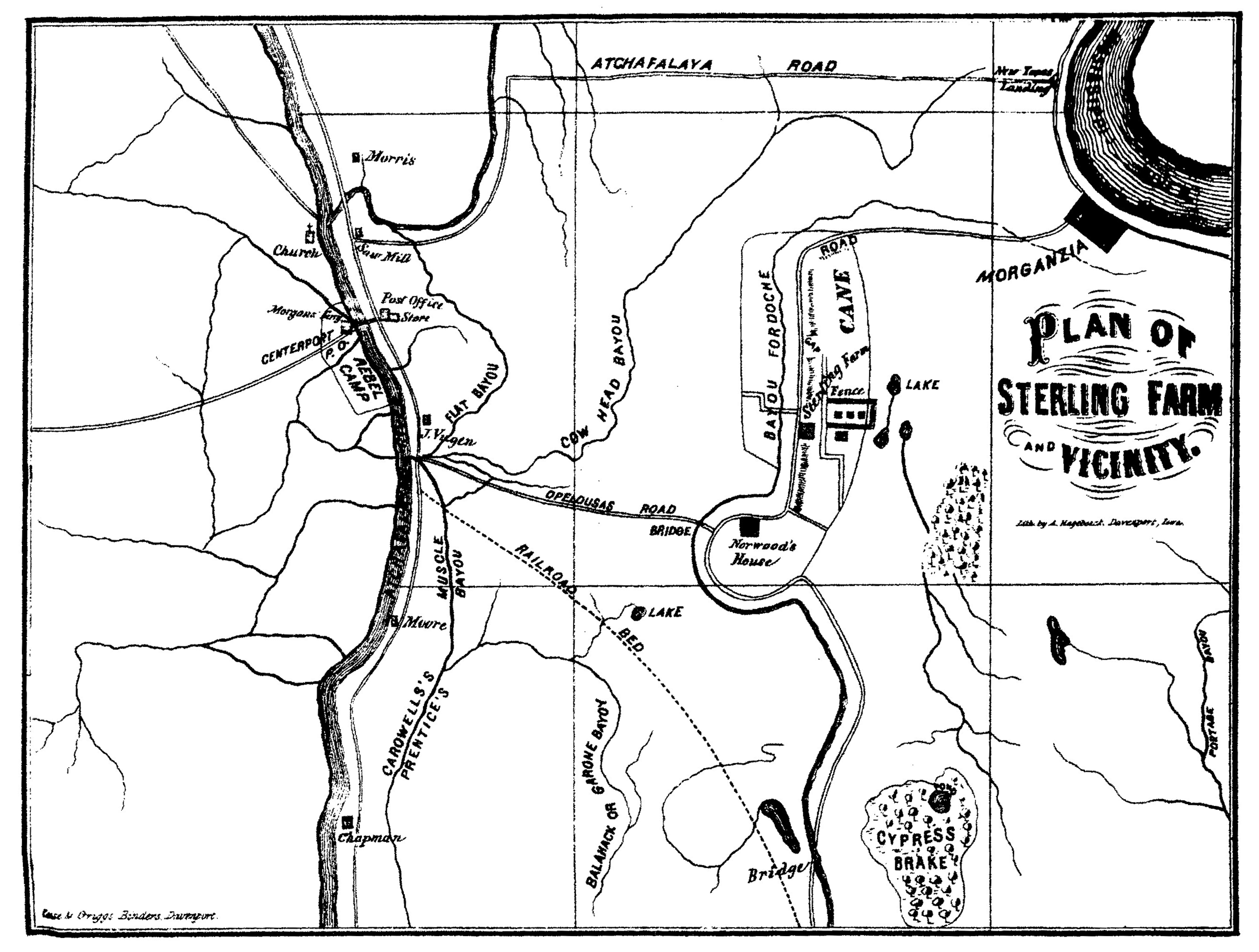
- The regiment helped capture a Union force at the Battle of Stirling's Plantation.
- Active: Early 1862 – May 1865
- Country: Confederate States of America
- Allegiance: Confederate States of America, Texas
- Branch: Confederate States Army
- Type: Cavalry
- Size: Regiment
- Engagements: American Civil War; First Battle of Newtonia (1862); Battle of McGuire's Store (1862); Battle of Prairie Grove (1862); Battle of Stirling's Plantation (1863); Battle of Mansfield (1864); Battle of Pleasant Hill (1864); Battle of Yellow Bayou (1864)

Commanders
- Notable commanders: Trezevant C. Hawpe

The 31st Texas Cavalry Regiment was a unit of mounted volunteers from Texas that fought in the Confederate States Army during the American Civil War. Trevezant C. Hawpe organized the regiment in early 1862 with recruits mostly from Dallas County, Texas, and surrounding areas. In June 1862, it marched to Arkansas where it joined a brigade led by Douglas H. Cooper. The unit fought at Newtonia and McGuire's Store in the autumn of 1862 and subsequently dismounted to serve as infantry. The regiment served at Prairie Grove in December 1862. It moved to Louisiana in February 1863 at which time Hawpe resigned. The unit helped defeat a Federal force at Stirling's Plantation in September 1863. The following month it joined a brigade led by Camille de Polignac. In 1864 the regiment fought at Mansfield, Pleasant Hill, and Yellow Bayou during the Red River Campaign. In March 1865 the regiment marched to Texas where it disbanded in May.

== See also ==
- List of Texas Civil War Confederate units
