= John Schofield =

United States Army Medal of Honor recipient and Union Army general (1831–1906)

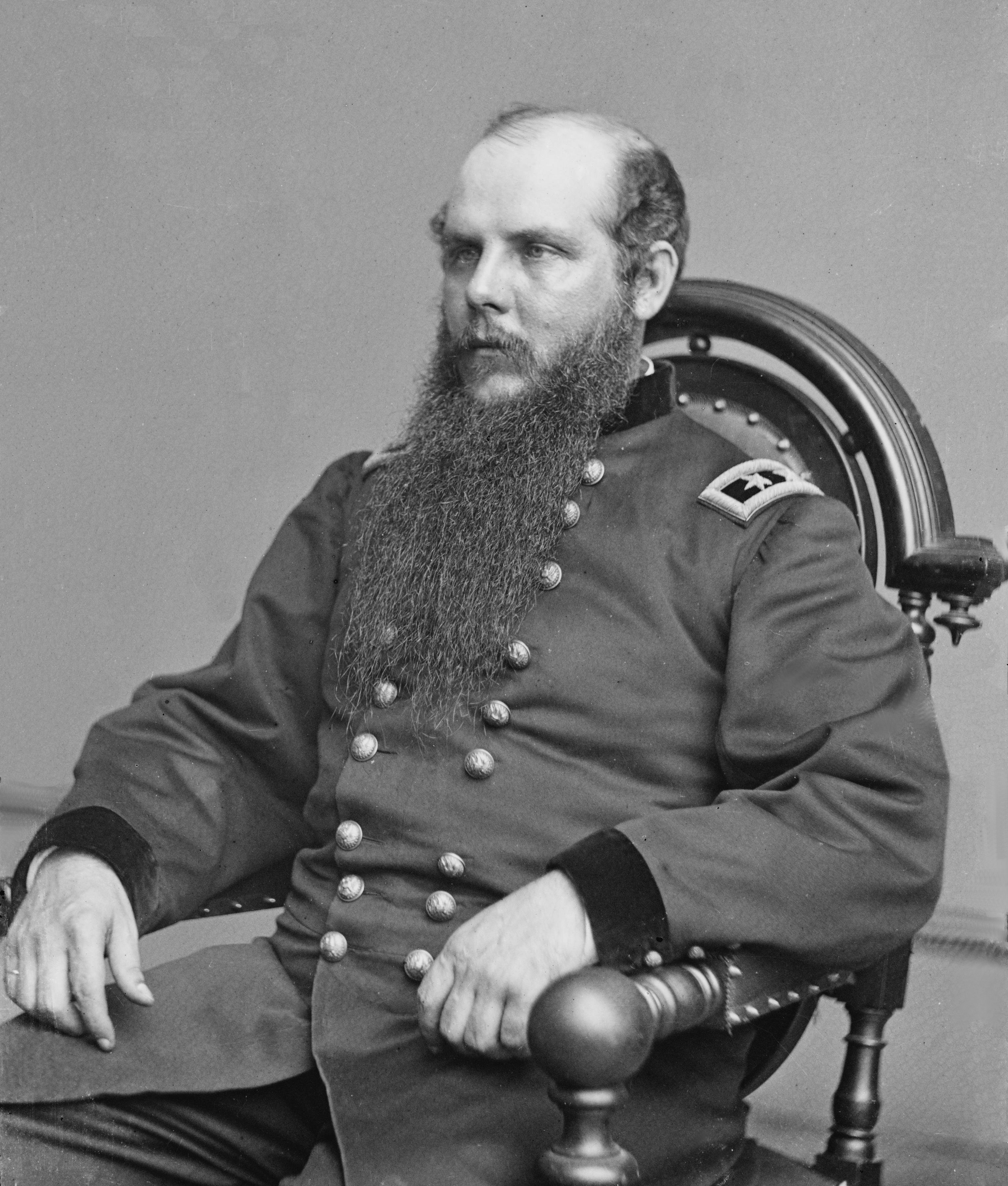
- Portrait of Schofield by Mathew Benjamin Brady, 1855–1865

Commanding General of the U.S. Army
- In office August 14, 1888 – September 29, 1895
- President: Grover Cleveland; Benjamin Harrison; Grover Cleveland
- Preceded by: Philip Sheridan
- Succeeded by: Nelson A. Miles

28th United States Secretary of War
- In office June 1, 1868 – March 13, 1869
- President: Andrew Johnson; Ulysses S. Grant
- Preceded by: Edwin Stanton
- Succeeded by: John Aaron Rawlins

Personal details
- Born: John McAllister Schofield; September 29, 1831 Gerry, New York, U.S.
- Died: March 4, 1906 (aged 74) St. Augustine, Florida, U.S.
- Resting place: Arlington National Cemetery
- Party: Republican
- Spouses: Harriet Whitehorn Bartlett (died 1888) Georgia Wells Kilbourne (m. 1891)
- Children: 7
- Education: United States Military Academy (BS)

Military service
- Allegiance: United States
- Branch/service: United States Army
- Years of service: 1853–1860; 1861–1895
- Rank: Lieutenant General
- Commands: Superintendent of the United States Military Academy (1876–1881); Army of the Frontier; Department of the Missouri; XXIII Corps; Army of the Ohio
- Battles/wars: American Civil War; Battle of Wilson's Creek; Atlanta campaign; Battle of Utoy Creek; Franklin–Nashville campaign; Battle of Franklin; Battle of Nashville; Campaign of the Carolinas; Battle of Wyse Fork
- Awards: Medal of Honor
- Employers: United States Military Academy; Washington University in St. Louis

John McAllister Schofield (/ˈskoʊfiːld/; September 29, 1831 – March 4, 1906) was an American soldier who held major commands during the American Civil War. He was appointed U.S. Secretary of War (1868–1869) under President Andrew Johnson and later served as Commanding General of the United States Army (1888–1895). (Note: Schofield was Secretary of War 6/1/1868 to 3/13/1869. Grant took office on 3/4/1869; While it is technically correct that Schofield held the office under Grant for 10 days, it is misleading and confusing to suggest he served as Secretary of War for both presidents. Schofield had the position as a lame duck during the transition period between presidential administrations.)

== Early life ==
John McAllister Schofield was born September 29, 1831, in Gerry, New York, the son of the Reverend James Schofield and his first wife, the former Caroline (McAllister) Schofield. His father, a Baptist minister in Sinclairville became a domestic missionary and moved his family (which then included six children and would include 10 who survived infancy) to Bristol, Illinois. When John was 12, they finally settled in Freeport, Illinois, where Rev. Schofield became the town's first Baptist minister in 1845, and where he was ultimately buried in 1888.

During the American Revolutionary War, his family consisted of both Patriots and Loyalists. His grandfather at the time was considered below the age to fight during the Revolution. Though, after settling in New York, he fought in the New York Militia during the War of 1812. His earliest ancestor who arrived in America was Richard Schofield, who came to the Massachusetts Bay Colony from England in 1635.

As a young man John Schofield was educated in the public schools, helped his family farm and build their home, and then surveyed land in northern Wisconsin before spending a year teaching school in Oneco, Illinois. Then U.S. Rep. Thomas J. Turner secured John Schofield an appointment to the United States Military Academy at West Point. He sold land for travel expenses and reported on June 1, 1849. In his final year at the academy, while a teaching assistant in the mathematics section, cadet Schofield was accused of allowing others in his classroom to make offensive jokes and drawings on the blackboard. He was dismissed from West Point, but after meeting with Illinois' U.S. Senator Stephen A. Douglas, appealed the decision to the Secretary of War, who referred the matter back to a Board of Inquiry at the academy. A majority of the review board voted to rescind the expulsion, but one of the two officers who voted to sustain it, cavalry and artillery instructor Lt. George H. Thomas, later became a commander of Schofield during the Civil War. Although Schofield's eventual memoirs did not mention Thomas on the review board, his persistent criticism of Thomas's generalship after the war may reflect this incident. Schofield graduated in 1853, ranking seventh in his class, and was commissioned a brevet second lieutenant in the artillery.

Schofield served for two years in the artillery. His first post was at Fort Moultrie, South Carolina, which he later noted involved the same guns that were used to bombard Fort Sumter in 1861. He then served at various places in Florida during the armed truce with the Seminole Nation, but contracted fevers and dysentery and was ultimately evacuated (with the assistance of future Confederate General A. P. Hill) and recovered at Culpeper, Virginia.

Upon regaining his health, First Lieutenant Schofield returned to West Point as assistant professor of natural and experimental philosophy from 1855 to 1860. His career seemed stalled, so he took leave (1860–1861), to work as professor of physics at Washington University in St. Louis. Several of his brothers had settled in St. Louis, following the lead of his eldest brother Rev. James Van Pelt Schofield (1825–1898).

== Civil War ==
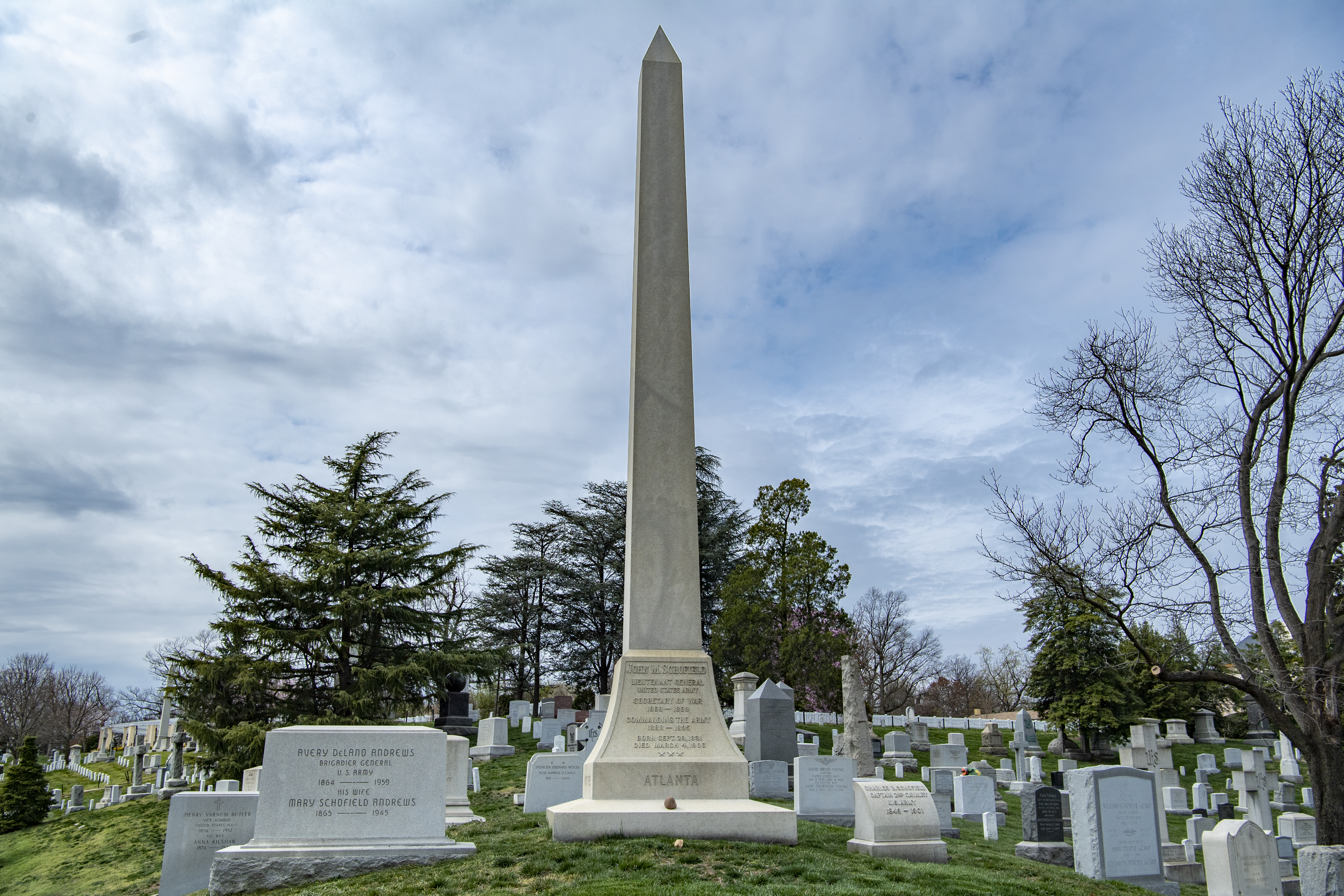
Grave at Arlington National Cemetery

When the Civil War broke out, Schofield helped assure that Missouri did not join the Confederacy. He became a major in the 1st Missouri Infantry Regiment and served as chief of staff to Maj. Gen. Nathaniel Lyon until Lyon's death during the Battle of Wilson's Creek (Missouri) in August 1861. Schofield acted with "conspicuous gallantry" during the battle, and decades later received the Medal of Honor for that action.

Schofield was promoted to brigadier general of volunteers on November 21, 1861. From 1861 to 1863 he held various commands in the Trans-Mississippi Theater. He commanded the District of St. Louis from that date to April 10, 1862, the Military District of Missouri from June 5 to September 24, 1862, and the District of Southwest Missouri to November 10, 1862. He led the Army of the Frontier from October 12, 1862, to May 30, 1863. He was promoted to major general of volunteers on November 29, 1862, at the age of 31, making him one of the youngest major generals in the Civil War.

On September 30, 1862, a Federal brigade suffered a defeat at the First Battle of Newtonia in southwest Missouri. Both James G. Blunt and Schofield rushed to Newtonia, Missouri, with reinforcements and sent the Confederate force fleeing south into Arkansas. The department commander Samuel Ryan Curtis created the Army of the Frontier with Schofield in command. Blunt led the 1st Division, James Totten the 2nd Division, and Francis J. Herron the 3rd Division. The army numbered 20,000 men, but probably 14,000 were fit for duty. Schofield's army crossed into northwest Arkansas on 17 October. Blunt's division soon moved west into Indian Territory where it won the Battle of Old Fort Wayne on October 22. Meanwhile, Schofield with the 2nd and 3rd Divisions occupied Huntsville, Arkansas. Schofield's troops clashed with forces led by Thomas C. Hindman, and the Confederates retreated south on 29 October. On November 4, with the approval of his superior Samuel R. Curtis, Schofield's two divisions withdrew northeast to Springfield, Missouri while Blunt's division remained in northwest Arkansas.

He was eventually relieved of duty in the West, at his own request, due to altercations with Curtis.

From April 17 to May 10, 1863, Schofield led the 3rd Division in the XIV Corps, Army of the Cumberland. He returned to Missouri as commander of the Department of Missouri from May 24, 1863, to January 30, 1864. His command in Missouri was marred by controversy after a massacre at Lawrence, Kansas, when Schofield refused to allow a posse to pursue the combatants into Missouri. Pro-Union Missourians sent a delegation to Washington, D.C., in October to plead with President Lincoln to dismiss Schofield for sympathizing with pro-Confederate Bushwhacker para-military marauders who were attacking loyal Union citizens. Lincoln backed Schofield's position, attributed the carnage to wartime conditions rather than the commander's inadequacy, and instructed Schofield to respect civil liberties unless assemblies or newspapers were working palpable harm to the military.

In 1864, as commander of the Army of the Ohio, Schofield participated in the Atlanta campaign under Major General William T. Sherman. Sherman placed him in command of a major operation to break the rail lines in late July 1864. Schofield became embroiled in another controversy prior to the Battle of Utoy Creek, with the commander of the US XIV Corps (Volunteer), Major General John Palmer, who resigned rather than serve under Schofield, whom he considered to be of lower rank, but whom Gen. Sherman backed. Schofield with his XXIII Corps and the XIV Corps then spent the month in front of Atlanta and East Point with lackluster results. Sherman resorted to a flanking movement to defeat the Confederates under Hood. Schofield was sent to cut off Hardee's retreat at Jonesboro but failed to move. He became embroiled in a further controversy, when placed under General Stanley commanding the US IV Corps, on August 30, 1864.

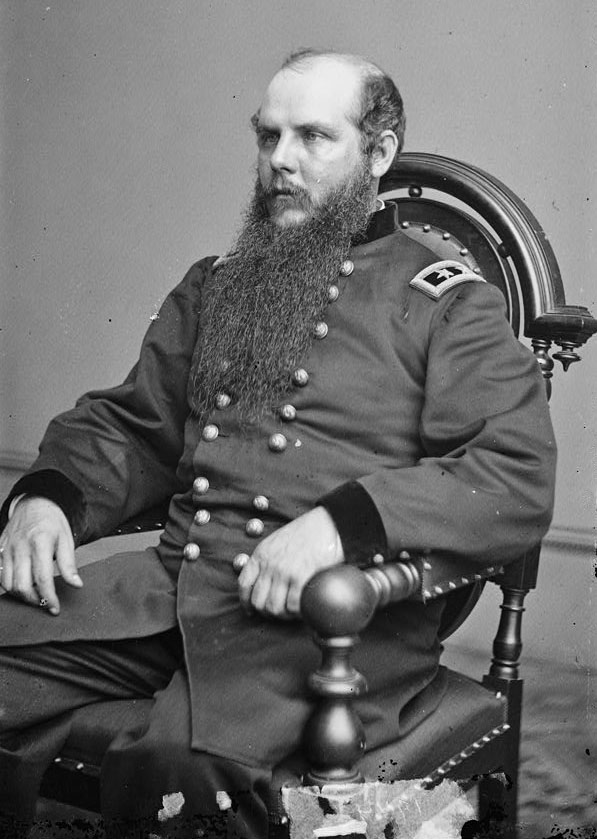
John Schofield during the Civil War

Sherman, after the fall of Atlanta, took the majority of his forces on a March to the Sea through Georgia. Schofield's Army of the Ohio was detached to join Major General George H. Thomas in Tennessee. When Confederate General John Bell Hood invaded Tennessee and nearly cut off Schofield's command at Spring Hill, Hood's rash assault to regain momentum at the subsequent Battle of Franklin resulted in a significant defeat. On December 15–16, Schofield took part in Thomas's crowning victory at the Battle of Nashville where Hood's Army of Tennessee was decisively defeated, and effectively destroyed as a fighting force for the remainder of the war. However, during the buildup towards the battle Schofield intrigued against Thomas, feeding Grant false information, in order to try to succeed his senior in command. For his services at Franklin he was awarded the rank of brigadier general in the regular army on November 30, 1864, and the brevet rank of major general on March 13, 1865.

Ordered to operate with Sherman in North Carolina, Schofield moved his corps by rail and sea to Fort Fisher, North Carolina, in 17 days, occupied Wilmington on February 22, 1865, fought the action at Kinston on March 10, and on March 23, joined Sherman at Goldsboro. He accompanied Sherman to Bennett Place on April 26 to meet with Confederate General Joseph E. Johnston to discuss terms of surrender for the latter's forces. At Schofield's suggestion, additional "Terms of a Military Convention" and "Supplemental Terms" were appended to the larger agreement which permitted Confederate soldiers to be allowed to return to their homes, ensured their private property rights, and offered them means of transportation.

== Reconstruction ==
After securing a final agreement from General Johnston, Sherman left Raleigh on April 28, 1865, leaving Schofield in charge of the Department of North Carolina. With the state's Confederate civil government displaced and no Unionist civil authority available to take over, Schofield was left to govern the state under martial law. The day before Sherman's departure, Schofield issued two general orders. The first declared the end to a state of war in North Carolina while the second declared the freedom of all slaves in the state. He quickly turned his attention towards the parole of Confederate soldiers, meeting Johnston in Greensboro to discuss its implementation on May 2. He also met North Carolina Governor Zebulon Vance and informed him that his mandate was voided, but declined to arrest him, saying he had no instructions to do so. To maintain law and order, he deployed the 46,000 troops under his command across North Carolina with orders to "visit all parts of the State, disperse or capture all bands of guerillas and marauders, and collect all military arms" except those exempt under previous surrender agreements. He also directed the creation of civilian police forces in each county to arrest criminals and hand them over to military authorities for tribunal.

Schofield complained of a lack of direction from the federal government and President Andrew Johnson while he administered the occupation in North Carolia Taking matters into his own hands with regards to the status of recently-freed slaves, he issued an order to inform the former slaves and their former masters of their social responsibilities. The directive stipulated that freed slaves assumed full responsibility for their children, and if they or adult relatives were unavailable, former slaveholders assumed the role of legal guardians for freed children, elderly, and ill persons. Former masters were prohibited from evicting such persons under their care, and able freedmen were barred from vagrancy. Freedmen were permitted to travel in search of employment but were to expect only modest compensation for their labor for near future and could not receive any aid from the government or their former owners unless they worked. Schofield ordered all army officers and leaders of county police to administer his instructions. As the Freedmen's Bureau had yet to be established in the state, the general further ordered that each district commanding officer was to appoint an officer and several assistants to ensure refugees' return to their homes, distribute aid to the homeless, and mediate disputes concerning freedpeople.

One June 4, Schofield wrote to General Grant, reporting North Carolina to be peaceful and requesting leave of his post. He turned over his command to General Jacob D. Cox on June 20 and left the state.

After the war, President Andrew Johnson sent Schofield on a special diplomatic mission to France, urging withdrawal of French troops in Mexico. General Schofield also joined the Military Order of the Loyal Legion of the United States, a military society composed of officers of the Union armed forces and their descendants. After retiring from active duty, Schofield served as the Order's commander-in-chief (from 1899 to 1903).

During Reconstruction, President Johnson appointed Schofield to serve as military governor of Virginia and of the First Military District. Thus, he oversaw the elections (in which blacks and whites voted) which resulted in the Virginia Constitutional Convention of 1868. When Radicals took over that convention and proposed to disenfranchise former Confederates Schofield voiced concerns about corruption to Congress as well as his commander, General Ulysses Grant. Schofield's position was of high importance and sensitivity, due to the region's proximity to Washington as well as Confederate President Jefferson Davis's incarceration in Norfolk and awaiting trial under Judge John Curtiss Underwood, who chaired the Constitutional Convention and had close links with Congressional Republicans. After President Johnson forced Edwin M. Stanton, a Radical Republican who had served as Secretary of War since 1862, to resign, Schofield served as Secretary of War from June 1868 to March 1869.

== Postwar career ==
Schofield was promoted to major general in the Regular Army on March 4, 1869, the same day General Ulysses S. Grant was sworn in as president of the United States. Schofield then served for a year as head of the Department of Missouri, the Army's second largest military department.

Following General George Thomas' death, Schofield succeeded him in commanding the Military Division of the Pacific, the country's largest.

In 1873, Schofield was given a secret task by Secretary of War William Belknap to investigate the strategic potential of a United States presence in the Hawaiian Islands. Schofield's report recommended that the United States establish a naval port at Pearl Harbor.

Starting in 1876 until 1881, Schofield became superintendent of the United States Military Academy. A major focus was reducing hazing and increasing professionalism within the academy. In 1878, Schofield drew the ire of Radical Republicans when President Rutherford B. Hayes asked him to reopen the case of Major General Fitz John Porter, who had been convicted by a court-martial for cowardice and disobedience at the Second Battle of Bull Run. Schofield's review board used new evidence from Confederate generals who had participated in the battle, and then found that Porter had been wrongly convicted and that his actions might have saved the entire Union army from complete defeat caused by the ineptitude of Maj. Gens. John Pope and Irvin McDowell.

On April 5, 1880, an African American cadet at West Point, Johnson Chesnut Whittaker, was found bruised and beaten in his cot. He claimed that he had been attacked by fellow cadets, but the administration claimed he had fabricated his story to win sympathy. Whittaker was court-martialed and expelled for allegedly faking an assault on himself staged by his fellow cadets. A Congressional investigation into the incident resulted in Schofield's removal from his post as superintendent in 1881.

Schofield then served in the Department of the Gulf (1881–82), the Military Division of the Pacific (1882–83), the Military Division of the Missouri (1883–86), and the Military Division of the Atlantic (1886–88). He also went to France to witness military maneuvers there. Gen. Schofield was also the first President of the Army and Navy Club (founded 1885, incorporated 1891).

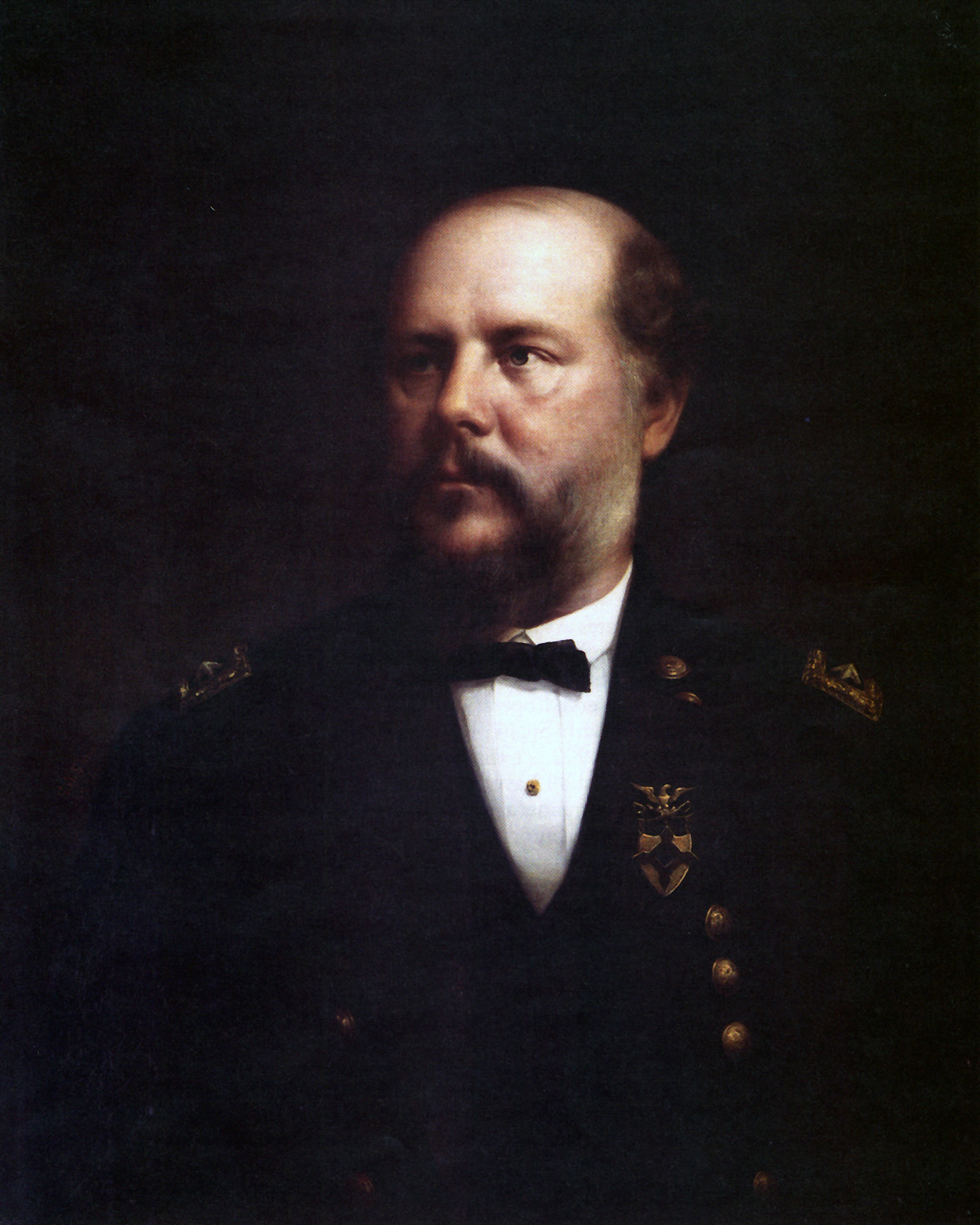
Official U.S. Army Chiefs of Staff portrait, by Stephen W. Shaw, 1874

Upon the death of General Philip Sheridan in 1888, General Schofield, by virtue of his seniority in rank, became the commanding general of the United States Army. He supported military professionalism, including subordination to the civilian Secretary of War. Schofield also supported adoption of lineal promotions and initiated performance reviews which limited political patronage considerations from the promotion process. Writing from South Dakota, General Schofield seconded a report of General Thomas H. Ruger which urged the federal government to honor treaty obligations with Native Americans.

General Schofield awarded himself the Medal of Honor on July 2, 1892, for his actions at the Battle of Wilson's Creek in 1861. During the unrest of the Pullman Strike, Schofield worked with President Cleveland in a discreet advisory role. On February 5, 1895, he was promoted to the rank of lieutenant general. Lieutenant General Schofield retired on September 29, 1895, upon reaching the mandatory retirement age of 64.

However, he remained active in government affairs, supporting Elihu Root, testifying before congressional committees in support of the Army Reorganization Act of 1901 and the Dick Act of 1903 which established the U.S. National Guard.

== Personal life ==
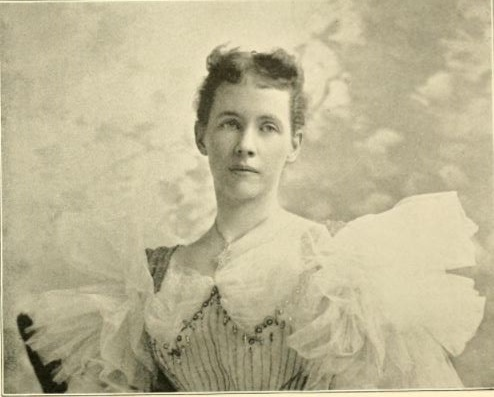
Georgia Wells Kilbourne, the second Mrs Schofield

John Schofield married Harriet Whitehorn Bartlett, daughter of William H. C. Bartlett (Chairman of West Point's Department of Philosophy) and they had two daughters and four sons. Two sons, John (1858–1868) and Henry (1862–1863), died before reaching adulthood. William Bartlett Schofield (1860–1906) survived to adulthood and began a U.S. Army career, rising to Major, as did Richmond McAlister Schofield (1867–1941). After Harriet died in 1888, she was buried with her father and son John in the United States Military Academy Post cemetery.

At age 60, in Keokuk, Iowa on June 18, 1891, Schofield remarried, to 27-year-old Georgia Wells Kilbourne, with whom he had a daughter, Georgiana. Georgia Wells Kilbourne was a native of Keokuk, Iowa. She was the daughter of George Kilbourne, and was named Georgia for her father. She attended school in New York, and afterwards studied abroad. Her mother, Mrs. Kilbourne, and her younger sister, Miss Emma Kilbourne, spent a part of the year at her Washington home. Emma Kilbourne devoted much of her time to reading and study.

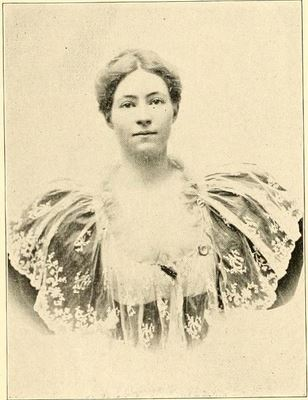
Emma Kilbourne, Schofield's sister-in-law

During his military career, perhaps because of his reformer image, Schofield was dogged by accusations of favoritism toward family members. His brother George Wheeler Schofield (1833–1882) also became a brevet Brigadier General of U.S. Volunteers during the American Civil War, originally volunteering with the 1st Missouri Volunteer Infantry in November 1861 and promoted to captain in the 1st Missouri Light Artillery after the Siege of Vicksburg, and rising to command the 2nd Regiment Missouri Volunteer Light artillery and ultimately being commissioned as a Major in the Regular Army after the Civil War and serving in the 10th Cavalry and later the 6th Cavalry on the Western Frontier, and for whom the .45 caliber Smith and Wesson Schofield revolver was named. Another brother Charles Brewster Schofield (1849–1901) graduated from West Point in 1870. C.B. Schofield later served as his Gen. J.M. Schofield's aide during the Indian Wars from 1878 to 1885. After rising to the rank of Captain during the Spanish–American War, he died of a heart attack in Matanzas, Cuba in 1901 and was also buried at Arlington National Cemetery. While Gen. John Schofield was in charge of Military District No. 1 in Virginia, his brother Elisha McAllister Schofield (1835–1870) was the assessor for the City of Richmond, Virginia and was among many killed on April 26, 1870, as a result of the infamous collapse of the balcony at the State Capitol during a session of the Virginia Court of Appeals. His son in law, Brig. Gen. Avery D. Andrews and his wife Mary Campbell Schofield Andrews are also buried at Arlington National Cemetery.

== Death and legacy ==
Before his death, Schofield became the last surviving member of Andrew Johnson's cabinet. His memoirs, Forty-six Years in the Army, were published in 1897. General Schofield became an honorary companion of the Military Order of Foreign Wars.

General Schofield died at St. Augustine, Florida on March 4, 1906. He is buried at Arlington National Cemetery. Schofield Barracks, Hawaii are named in his honor.

Today, Schofield is also remembered for a lengthy quotation that all cadets at the United States Military Academy at West Point, The Citadel, Officer Candidate School at Fort Benning, and the United States Air Force Academy are required to memorize. It is an excerpt from his graduation address to the class of 1879 at West Point:

The discipline which makes the soldiers of a free country reliable in battle is not to be gained by harsh or tyrannical treatment. On the contrary, such treatment is far more likely to destroy than to make an army. It is possible to impart instruction and give commands in such a manner and such a tone of voice as to inspire in the soldier no feeling, but an intense desire to obey, while the opposite manner and tone of voice cannot fail to excite strong resentment and a desire to disobey. The one mode or other of dealing with subordinates springs from a corresponding spirit in the breast of the commander. He who feels the respect which is due to others cannot fail to inspire in them respect for himself. While he who feels, and hence manifests, disrespect towards others, especially his subordinates, cannot fail to inspire hatred against himself.

— John M. Schofield

== Medal of Honor citation ==

Rank and organization:

Major, 1st Missouri Infantry. Place and date: At Wilsons Creek, Mo., August 10, 1861. Entered service at: St. Louis, Mo. Born: September 29, 1831, Gerry, N.Y. Date of issue: July 2, 1892.

Citation:

Was conspicuously gallant in leading a regiment in a successful charge versus the enemy.

The medal was recommended by Schofield himself when he was interim U.S. Secretary of War (1868–69). Historian Benson Bobrick is critical of this and notes the vagueness of the details in the citation.

General Schofield was posthumously entitled to the Civil War Campaign Medal and the Indian Campaign Medal. Both medals were created in 1907, a year after Schofield died.

== Dates of rank ==
Insignia	Rank	Date	Component
	Brevet Second Lieutenant	July 1, 1853	2nd Artillery
	Second Lieutenant	August 31, 1853	1st Artillery
	First Lieutenant	March 3, 1855	1st Artillery
	Major	April 26, 1861	1st Missouri Infantry
	Captain	May 14, 1861	1st Artillery
	Major	June 26, 1861	1st Missouri Artillery
	Brigadier General	November 21, 1861	Volunteers
	Major General	November 29, 1862	Volunteers
	Brigadier General	March 4, 1863	Volunteers
	Major General	May 12, 1863	Volunteers
	Brigadier General	November 30, 1864	Regular Army
	Brevet Major General	March 13, 1865	Regular Army
	Major General	March 4, 1869	Regular Army
	Lieutenant General	February 5, 1895	Regular Army

== See also ==
- List of Medal of Honor recipients
- List of American Civil War Medal of Honor recipients: Q–S
- List of American Civil War generals (Union)

== Notes ==
Military offices
Preceded by none	Commander of the Army of the Frontier; October 12, 1862 – March 30, 1863	Succeeded by James G. Blunt
Preceded by Thomas H. Ruger	Superintendents of the United States Military Academy; 1876–1881	Succeeded by Oliver O. Howard
Preceded by Philip H. Sheridan	Commanding General of the United States Army; 1888–1895	Succeeded by Nelson A. Miles
Political offices
Preceded by Edwin M. Stanton	U.S. Secretary of War; Served under: Andrew Johnson; June 1, 1868 – March 13, 1869	Succeeded by John Aaron Rawlins
