= First Battle of Newtonia =

1862 battle of the American Civil War

- Part of the Trans-Mississippi Theater of the American Civil War
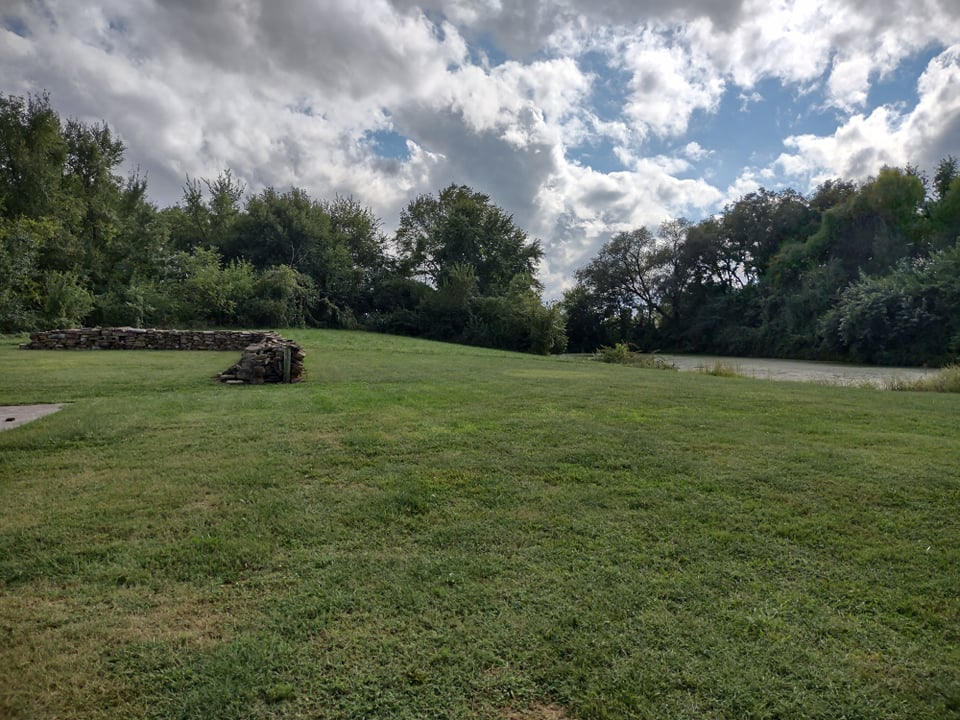
- Stone wall near the Ritchey House. Fighting occurred close to this area during the battle.
Date	September 30, 1862
Location	Newtonia, Missouri 36.8836°N 94.1845°W
Result	Confederate victory

Belligerents
United States	Confederate States of America

Commanders and leaders
Frederick Salomon	Douglas H. Cooper; Joseph O. Shelby

Units involved
Salomon's brigade	Indian brigade; Shelby's Iron Brigade

Strength
c. 4,000 to c. 4,500	c. 5,500

Casualties and losses
245 or over 400	78
- A map of Missouri showing the location of Newtonia

The First Battle of Newtonia was fought on September 30, 1862, between Confederate soldiers commanded by Colonel Douglas H. Cooper and a Union column commanded by Brigadier General Frederick Salomon near Newtonia, Missouri, during the American Civil War. Cooper's force had moved into southwestern Missouri, and encamped near the town of Newtonia. The Confederate column was composed mostly of cavalry led by Colonel Joseph O. Shelby and a brigade of Native Americans. A Union force commanded by Brigadier General James G. Blunt moved to intercept Cooper's force. Blunt's advance force, led by Salomon, reached the vicinity of Newtonia on September 29, and attacked Cooper's position on September 30. A Union probing force commanded by Colonel Edward Lynde was driven out of Newtonia by Cooper's forces on the morning of the 30th.

Both sides brought up further reinforcements, and seesaw fighting took place during much of the afternoon. Shortly before nightfall, Cooper's Confederates made an all-out attack against the Union line; this led Salomon to withdraw from the field. Militia commanded by Colonel George Hall covered the Union retreat, although Confederate artillery fire struck the retreating forces. This panicked some of Salomon's men, and the retreat turned into a disorderly rout. Union casualties are variously reported as either 245 or over 400, and Confederate casualties were 78. Blunt's full division began advancing towards Newtonia in early October, leading Cooper to abandon Missouri. A portion of the battlefield was listed on the National Register of Historic Places in 2004 as the First Battle of Newtonia Historic District.

== Background ==
As the United States matured during the early 19th century, a large cultural divide developed between the northern states and the southern states over the issue of slavery. By the time of the 1860 United States Presidential Election, slavery had become one of the defining features of southern culture, with the ideology of states' rights being used to defend the institution. With the population of the industrializing North coming to exceed that of the South, the balance of power began to shift, and many southerners decided that secession was the only way to preserve slavery, especially after Abraham Lincoln was elected president in 1860. Lincoln's candidacy was regionally successful, as much of his support was from the northern states, while he received no electoral votes from the Deep South. Many southerners rejected the legitimacy of Lincoln's election, and promoted secession. On December 20, the state of South Carolina seceded, and the states of Mississippi, Florida, Alabama, Georgia, Louisiana, and Texas followed suit in early 1861. On February 4, the seceding states formed the Confederate States of America; Jefferson Davis became the nascent nation's president.

In Charleston Harbor, South Carolina, the important military installation of Fort Sumter was still held by a Union Army garrison. On the morning of April 12, the Confederates fired on Fort Sumter, beginning the American Civil War. The fort surrendered on April 13. Shortly after Fort Sumter was attacked, Lincoln requested that the states remaining in the Union provide 75,000 volunteers for the war effort. In the coming weeks, the states of Virginia, North Carolina, Tennessee, and Arkansas joined the Confederacy. A Union army commanded by Brigadier General Irvin McDowell moved south into Virginia and attacked two Confederate armies commanded by Brigadier Generals P. G. T. Beauregard and Joseph E. Johnston on July 21. In the ensuing First Battle of Bull Run, the Union army was routed.

Meanwhile, the population of the state of Missouri was badly divided. While Governor Claiborne F. Jackson and the Missouri State Guard, a militia organization, supported the Confederacy, Brigadier General Nathaniel Lyon, commander of the St. Louis Arsenal, supported the Union. Lyon drove Jackson and the Missouri State Guard, which was commanded by Major General Sterling Price, into southwestern Missouri, where they were joined by Brigadier General Ben McCulloch's Confederate force. Lyon attacked Price and McCulloch's combined camp on August 10 in the Battle of Wilson's Creek; Lyon was killed and his army defeated. Price then moved north with the Missouri State Guard in a campaign that culminated in the capture of Lexington in September. However, Union forces concentrated against Price, who then retreated back into southwestern Missouri. In February 1862, Union Brigadier General Samuel R. Curtis advanced against Price's position, causing the Confederates to abandon Missouri and enter Arkansas. In March, Price, McCulloch, and Major General Earl Van Dorn joined forces. Under the command of Van Dorn, the Confederates attacked Curtis at the Battle of Pea Ridge on March 7 and 8 but were repulsed. Pea Ridge and another Union victory at the Battle of Island Number Ten led the Union high command to feel secure enough to proclaim that "[there was] no Rebel flag now flying in Missouri".

== Prelude ==
This state of affairs did not last long. Price sent some of his troops into Missouri to obtain supplies and recruit new volunteers. The state was also raided by Confederate forces including the command of Colonel Joseph C. Porter, and was plagued by guerrilla attacks from bushwhackers including William Quantrill. At one point Quantrill's guerrillas combined with a regular Confederate force commanded by Colonel John T. Hughes. This combined force defeated a Union force at the First Battle of Independence on August 11. Union forces suffered another defeat on August 15, at the Battle of Lone Jack. The resurgence in Confederate activity was an embarrassment to the commander of the Union's Department of the Missouri, Brigadier General John M. Schofield, who was replaced by Curtis and relegated to the command of the Army of the Frontier.

This period of increased Confederate activity in Missouri was related to Major General Thomas C. Hindman's efforts to rebuild Confederate strength in Arkansas. While Hindman was successful in forging an army in an underdeveloped region, his methods were unpopular with prominent Arkansas civilians and he was replaced by Major General Theophilus H. Holmes. Hindman retained a field command under Holmes and pushed a 6,000-man force into northwestern Arkansas and the southwestern portion of Missouri. Cavalry forces under Colonel Douglas H. Cooper were positioned in Missouri, with Hindman's infantry component still in Arkansas near Elkhorn Tavern under the command of James S. Rains, a brigadier general in the Missouri State Guard. Hindman himself had been recalled to Little Rock, Arkansas, by Holmes. Cooper's force included the cavalry of Colonel Joseph O. Shelby's Iron Brigade, and a brigade of Confederate-sympathizing Native Americans. A Union force commanded by Brigadier General James G. Blunt and spearheaded by Brigadier General Frederick Salomon began moving south to confront the Confederates.

Cooper sent a scouting force to the Newtonia area on September 27. Commanded by Colonel Trezevant C. Hawpe, it was composed of the 31st Texas Cavalry Regiment and the 1st Cherokee Battalion. Hawpe determined that Newtonia, which was a communications hub, would be a good encampment and had his troops begin operating a grist mill to produce flour. After receiving Hawpe's appraisal of Newtonia's potential as a military base, Cooper ordered him to remain in Newtonia and reinforced him with Captain Joseph Bledsoe's Missouri Battery. On September 28, Hawpe was informed by local residents that Union troops were advancing towards Granby, which was about 7 miles (11 km) away, but Confederate scouts found no evidence of this movement. Meanwhile, Union forces began concentrating in southwestern Missouri. On September 28, two brigades under Colonel William A. Weer and Salomon rendezvoused at Sarcoxie, which was over 10 miles (16 km) from Newtonia; Colonel James Totten's division was expected to leave Springfield on September 29.

== Opposing forces ==
=== Union ===
The Union force engaged at Newtonia was a mixture of all three arms of the Union Army: infantry, cavalry, and artillery. Union cavalry consisted of the 6th and 9th Kansas, the 2nd Ohio, and 3rd Wisconsin Cavalry Regiments. Infantry regiments present at the battle were the 10th and 13th Kansas, and 9th Wisconsin Infantry Regiments. Artillery came from the 1st and 2nd Kansas Light Artillery Batteries, and the 25th Ohio Battery, as well as two mountain howitzers attached to Company F of the 9th Kansas Cavalry. Three of the cannons were 3-inch rifles and two were mountain howitzers. Also present was the 3rd Indian Home Guard. The historian Shelby Foote stated that the total strength of the Union column was 4,000 men, although other sources place the overall strength at 4,500.

=== Confederate ===
The Confederate forces at Newtonia included the 1st Cherokee Battalion, the 1st Choctaw Regiment, the 1st Choctaw and Chickasaw Mounted Rifles, Colonel A. M. Alexander's 34th Texas Cavalry Regiment, Lieutenant Colonel Beal G. Jeans' Missouri Cavalry Regiment, (Note: Officially known as the 12th Missouri Cavalry Regiment.) Hawpe's 31st Texas Cavalry Regiment, the 5th Missouri Cavalry Regiment, Colonel James G. Stevens' 22nd Texas Cavalry Regiment, Bledsoe's Battery, and Captain Sylvanus Howell's Texas Battery. Estimates of Confederate strength vary. Foote gives the total Confederate strength as 5,500 men: composed of 2,500 cavalrymen and 3,000 "Indians and guerrillas". The historian Daniel O'Flaherty provides a range compatible with Foote's estimate, the historian Larry Wood gives a range of 4,000 to 7,000, and other sources provide a range of 6,000 to 7,000.

== Battle ==
=== Preliminary action ===
On September 29, Salomon sent out three scouting forces: one to Neosho, one to Granby, and one to Newtonia. While the patrol to Neosho participated in a small action, the men sent to Granby saw no Confederate soldiers. The force headed for Newtonia consisted of 150 men from the 9th Kansas Cavalry, in four companies, commanded by Colonel Edward Lynde of the same unit, and including the regiment's two mountain howitzers. Lynde's men drove Confederate skirmishers back towards Newtonia, and determined that a strong enemy force occupied the town. Hawpe, still commanding the Confederates in Newtonia, reported the Union probe to Cooper, who sent Jean's regiment and the 5th Missouri Cavalry to Newtonia. Cooper had also been informed that Granby had been occupied by Union forces, so he ordered the 22nd Texas Cavalry there. Lynde reached Newtonia and found it held by the Confederates. After realizing that his mountain howitzers lacked the range to shell Newtonia, Lynde ordered a retreat. Two Confederate soldiers were captured, and informed the Union commander that Newtonia was occupied in strength. Meanwhile, Cooper and Shelby's two regiments arrived in Newtonia after the Union retreat; the retreating Union force was not pursued. Cooper then returned to the main Confederate camp. The two reinforcing regiments remained in Newtonia overnight, but were sent back to the main Confederate camp early the next morning. The 22nd Texas Cavalry arrived after the Union patrol had left Granby; the Texans occupied the abandoned town. Salomon noted the sounds of combat coming from the Newtonia area, and sent two companies of the 9th Wisconsin Infantry to support Lynde.

=== September 30 ===
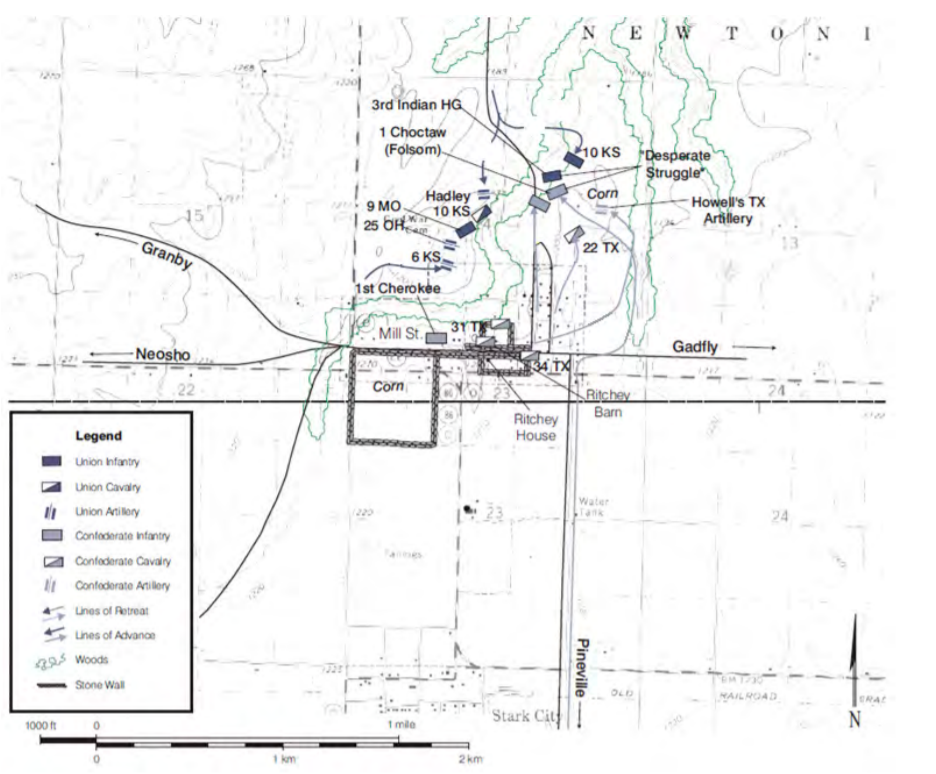
Map of the First Battle of Newtonia

The detachment from the 9th Wisconsin Infantry, joined by two more companies of the regiment, commanded by Lieutenant Colonel Arthur Jacobi, was reinforced by 45 men of the 6th Kansas Cavalry, 50 men from the 3rd Indian Home Guard, and three guns of the 25th Ohio Battery; the group reached the Newtonia area around 07:00 on September 30. An attempt to cut off the Confederate skirmish line by the men of the 6th Kansas Cavalry failed, and Jacobi's force lost the element of surprise. After some hard fighting, the detachment was joined by Lynde's probing force, who had returned to the Newtonia area. Hawpe responded to the start of the action by reporting the Union advance to Cooper. The Confederates, represented by the 31st Texas Cavalry, the 1st Cherokee Battalion, and Bledsoe's artillery, took up defensive positions near Mathew H. Ritchey's farm. An artillery duel began, which was deadlocked until the Union artillery advanced closer to the Confederate lines, which allowed their fire to become more effective. Some of the men of the 9th Wisconsin Infantry moved to the cover of the houses on the edge of Newtonia; they began sniping at the cannoneers of Bledsoe's battery. Cooper noticed that sounds of battle were coming from Newtonia, and sent the 34th Texas Cavalry there to reinforce Hawpe.

The men of the 31st Texas Cavalry had been taking shelter behind a stone wall, but left its cover to assault the Union line. This charge was quickly repulsed by canister fire from the Union artillery. After this, the Union artillery concentrated on Bledsoe's battery. The Confederate guns ran low on ammunition after about 30 minutes, and when the Union commanders saw the Confederate artillery fire slacken, the 9th Wisconsin Infantry charged the Confederate line. Bledsoe withdrew the pieces some distance, although the guns' silent presence did discourage a small Union cavalry force from advancing against the new Confederate artillery position. At this time, Confederate reinforcements in the form of the 1st Choctaw and Chickasaw Mounted Rifles and the 5th Missouri Cavalry arrived. The fresh units were enough to turn the tide against the 9th Wisconsin Infantry, which conducted a fighting retreat out of Newtonia. Additionally, the 22nd Texas Cavalry arrived from Granby to further strengthen the Confederates. The 22nd Texas Cavalry had planned on assaulting the Union artillery position, but the Missouri cavalry, commanded by Colonel B. Frank Gordon, mistook the Texans for Union troops, and the delay caused by the subsequent confrontation prevented an immediate assault. Lynde and Jacobi decided to withdraw, although a delayed charge by Gordon's cavalry interfered with the process. The Confederate charge was again dispersed with canister fire, after which the Union retreat began. The Confederates pursued, and the retreat soon became disorderly.

Like Cooper, Salomon learned about the fighting by hearing the sounds of battle coming from Newtonia. In response, Salomon sent the rest of the 6th Kansas Cavalry and the 3rd Indian Home Guard towards the town. Additional Union forces would begin moving towards Newtonia later, although Salomon's supply train was left behind in Sarcoxie. The two regiments encountered the Confederates pursuing Lynde's column, and the pursuit ended in the face of these fresh Union troops. In the interim, more Confederate units had reached Newtonia: Jeans' Cavalry Regiment and four cannons under the command of Howell. The Confederates were aware that Union reinforcements were on the way, and Howell placed his cannons in a position where they commanded the road the Union troops were advancing down. Union soldiers sighted Confederate troops positioned in front of Newtonia, and two Union cannons were then unlimbered. They began firing at the Confederate line, which soon retreated. After reaching Newtonia, the Union artillery again fired at the Confederate position, although Howell's guns quickly responded, driving off the Union cannons.

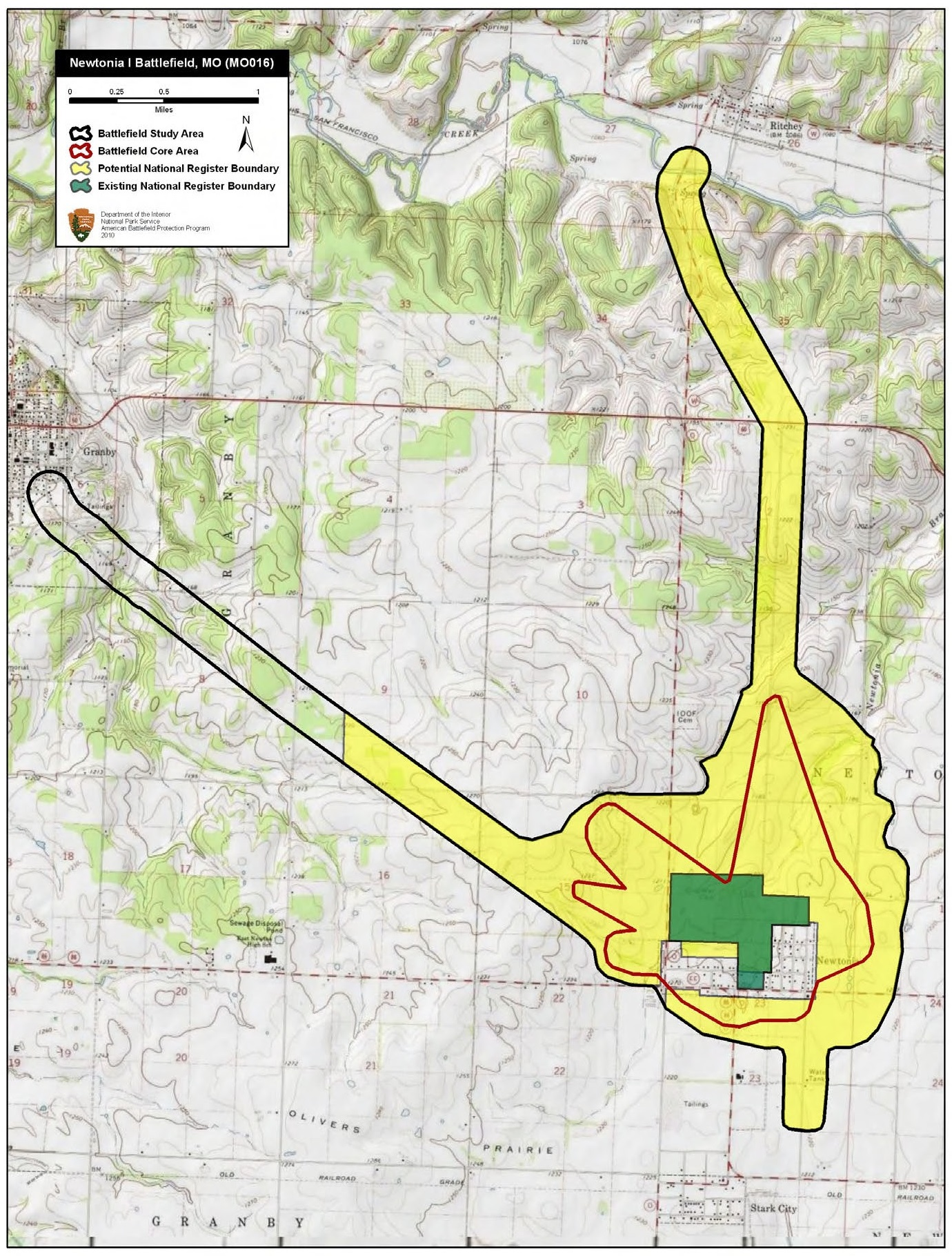
The American Battlefield Protection Program's map of the battlefield

The repulse of the 6th Kansas Cavalry and 3rd Indian Home Guard had occurred in the mid-morning of the 30th, and no further serious fighting occurred until the early afternoon. Salomon had left Sarcoxie earlier, but did not reach the Union line until about 15:30. He then proceeded to form a defensive line with nine available cannons, as well as the 6th Kansas Cavalry, the 3rd Indian Home Guard, and a portion of the 9th Wisconsin Infantry. Three cannons and their crews that had seen heavy fighting in Lynde's morning action and the 10th Kansas Infantry formed a reserve. The Union guns began an artillery duel with Howell's cannons, and the Confederate cannoneers were soon forced to retreat. An attempt by the Confederates to use the Ritchey barn as a fortification proved futile once the Union guns found the range of the structure. Meanwhile, the Confederates were again reinforced: Bledsoe's battery returned after leaving the field to resupply, and the 1st Choctaw Regiment arrived.

Cooper then sent Jeans' regiment and the 22nd Texas Cavalry to probe the Union line, but artillery fire and the 3rd Indian Home Guard drove them back; the 6th Kansas Cavalry was detached south as a result of this threat. The 3rd Indian Home Guard pursued the retreating Confederates, threatening the stability of the main Confederate line, but a flank attack by the 1st Choctaw Regiment stabilized the situation for the Confederates. The 1st Choctaw and Chickasaw Mounted Rifles also counterattacked. Salomon sent the 10th Kansas Infantry into the fray to support the 3rd Indian Home Guard, but fire from Howell's Confederate artillery, which had moved closer to the Union line, and an advance by the 22nd Texas Cavalry, compelled the Union troops to break off the assault. Cooper responded by initiating an attack with his entire force against the Union line. Salomon then ordered a withdrawal, and the Union troops began to retreat from the field.

A brigade of Unionist Missouri state militia forces commanded by Colonel George Hall arrived on the field as Salomon was ordering his retreat. Hall was ordered to cover the Union withdrawal, and the militia formed a line between Salomon's retreating force and the pursuing Confederates. A few pieces of Union artillery had remained in fighting order, and these guns supported Hall's line. Darkness hampered the effectiveness of the Union cannons, but Howell's artillery responded, using the muzzle flashes of the Union cannons as aiming points. The Confederate fire panicked the Union forces, and the orderly retreat turned into a rout. Some of the Union soldiers fled all the way to Sarcoxie. By this point, darkness had fallen, and neither army wished to bring on a night battle. After Salomon's troops had left the battlefield, Hall's militiamen withdrew in turn, still acting as a rear guard. Around the same time, Cooper called off the pursuit. The 1st Choctaw and Chickasaw Mounted Rifles failed to receive the order; Cooper later sent an officer to retrieve the regiment, ordering it back to the Confederate camp.

== Aftermath ==
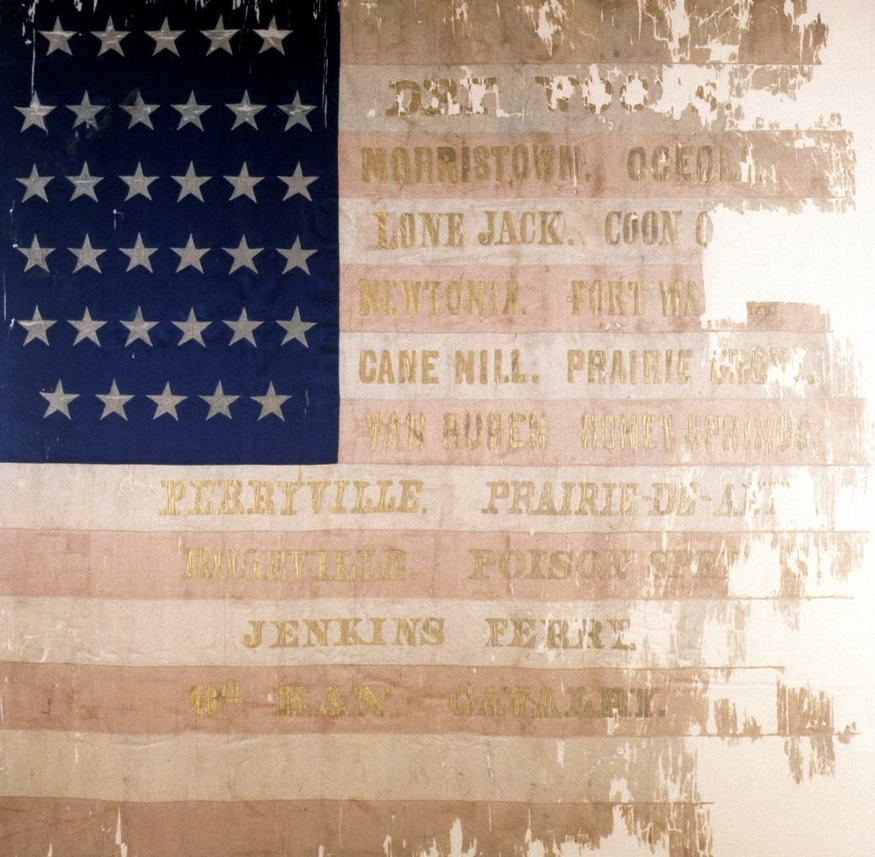
Flag of the 6th Kansas Cavalry, showing Newtonia battle honor

During the battle, the Confederates suffered 78 casualties; Union casualties are variously reported as 245 or over 400. Confederate casualties were highest in the 5th Missouri Cavalry, which lost four men killed and 11 wounded. The Confederates saw 15 officers become casualties, including one killed in each of the 1st Choctaw Regiment and the 1st Choctaw and Chickasaw Mounted Rifles. Salomon did not file an official report of his losses. However, he did note that the morning stage of the battle resulted in more Union casualties than the afternoon stage. Four companies of the 9th Wisconsin Infantry were stated to have suffered particularly high losses; those companies had been engaged with Lynde in the morning fight.

Despite defeating Salomon's Union force, the Confederate position around Newtonia was still not secure. Salomon had represented only the advance guard of Blunt's command. On October 2, additional troops of Blunt's division reached the Newtonia area from Fort Scott, Kansas, and Totten's division arrived from Springfield. By October 4, Cooper had decided to abandon Newtonia and southwestern Missouri. Shelby's cavalry was tasked with remaining in Newtonia to serve as a rear guard. However, he did not remain there long, as he soon received word that his line of retreat was in danger of being cut by the Union advance. Shelby fell back, and the Union troops occupied Newtonia after a brief bombardment of the town. The Confederate Native American troops retreated back to Indian Territory; the others retreated into northwestern Arkansas. As the Confederates engaged at Newtonia retreated from Missouri, other Confederate troops attacked and forced the surrender of a small Union garrison at the Battle of Clark's Mill near Vera Cruz.

On October 28, 1864, the Second Battle of Newtonia was fought near the site of the 1862 battle. In the 1864 battle, a Union army commanded by Blunt attacked and defeated a Confederate army led by Price. The Confederates had been retreating southwards after being defeated at the battles of Westport in Missouri, and Mine Creek in Kansas.

== Preservation ==
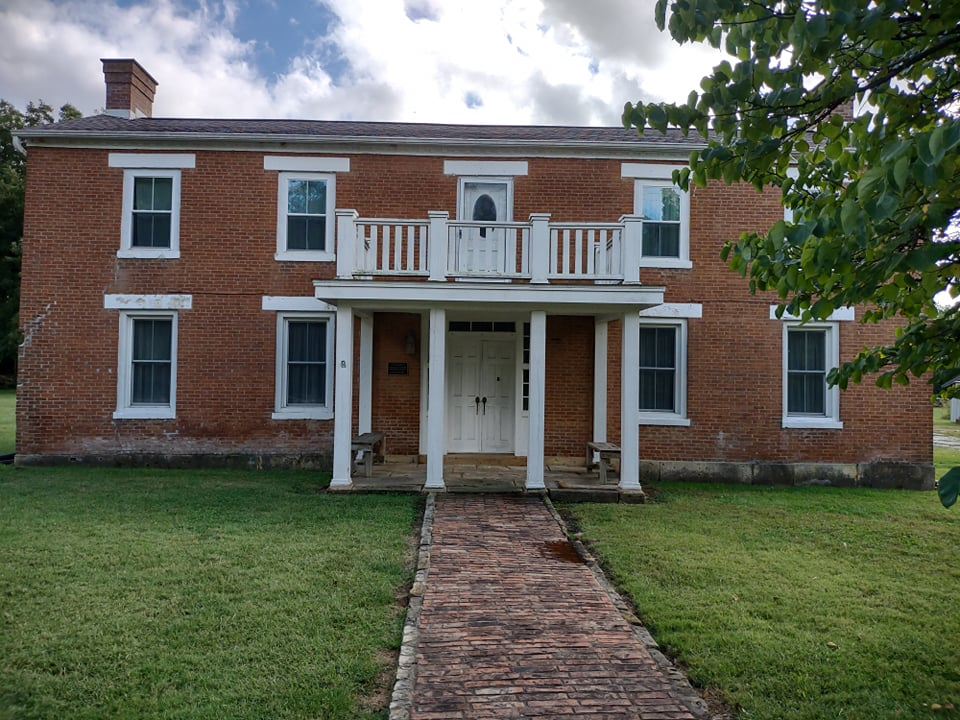
The Mathew H. Ritchey House in October 2021

The First Battle of Newtonia Historic District preserves 152.3 acres (61.6 ha) of the battlefield; the district was listed on the National Register of Historic Places in 2004. The separately-listed Mathew H. Ritchey House is located within the district. The site contains the Ritchey barn and barnyard site, a Civil War-era cemetery, the Newtonia Branch stream, the historic Neosho Road, and the battlefield itself. While much of the land in the district is privately owned, the Newtonia Battlefields Protection Association has ownership of 20 acres (8.1 ha). At least nine Union soldiers are buried in the cemetery, although not all of them are related to the First Battle of Newtonia. More war-related burials had previously been located there, as many of the military burials were exhumed and moved to the Springfield National Cemetery in 1869.

The Mathew H. Ritchey House is notable for having served as a headquarters building for both sides during the two battles of Newtonia and was used as a field hospital after the fighting. The American Battlefield Trust has participated in the preservation of 8 acres (3.2 ha) of the battlefield.

The American Battlefield Protection Program has suggested that it may be possible to enlarge the area of the historic district. However, the same study determined that the site did not meet the inclusion criteria for becoming an official unit of the National Park Service, as the cultural features at Newtonia were deemed too similar to those preserved in other National Park Service sites. The Ritchey House and 25 acres of the battlefields including the Old Newtonia Cemetery were added to Wilson's Creek National Battlefield in 2022 by the Consolidated Appropriations Act, 2023, despite National Park Service opposition due to the lack of connection, need for protection, or enhancement of public enjoyment.
