= 34th Texas Cavalry Regiment =

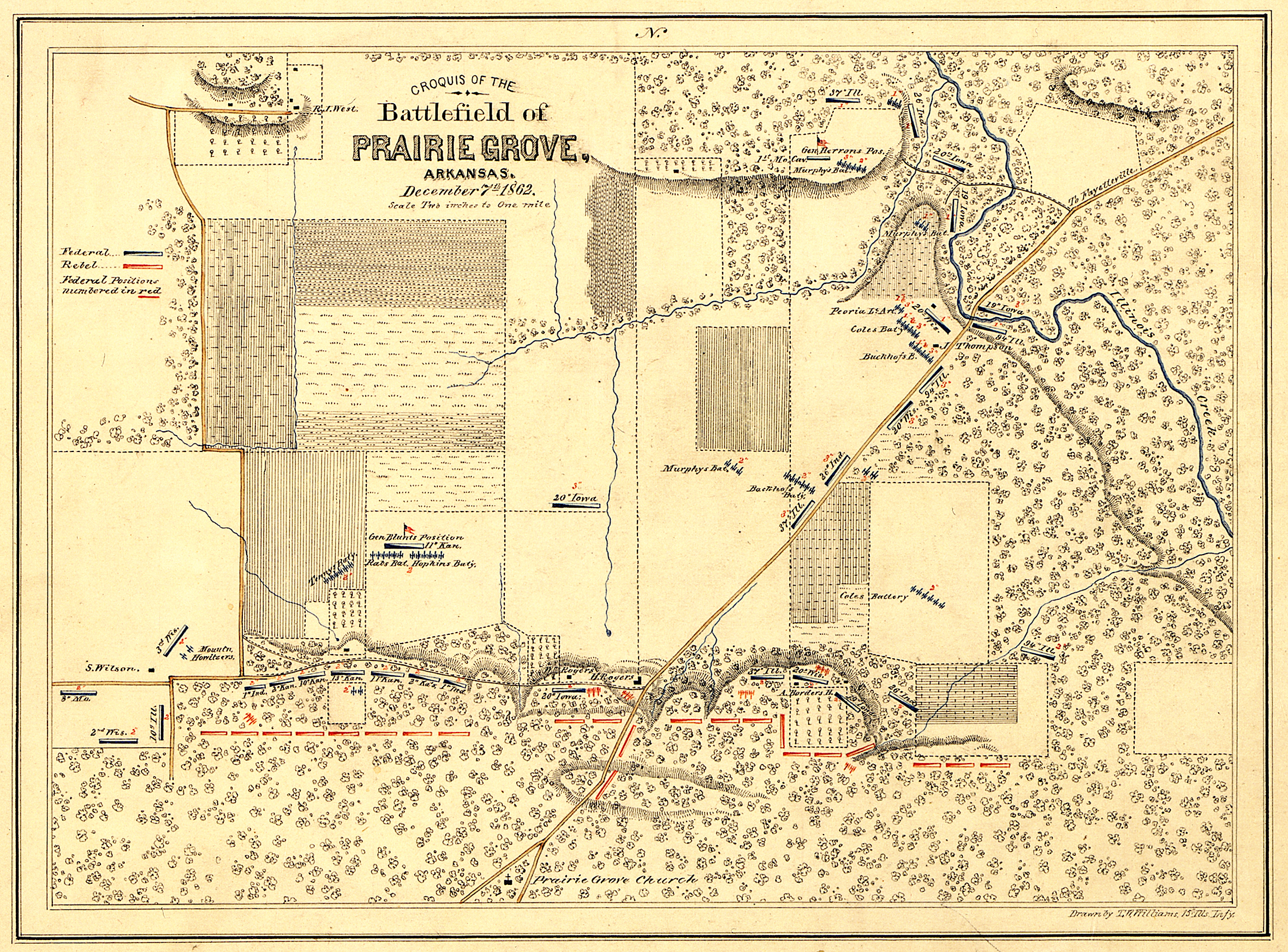
- Map shows the Battle of Prairie Grove.
- Active: Winter 1861–62 – May 1865
- Country: Confederate States of America
- Allegiance: Confederate States of America, Texas
- Branch: Confederate States Army
- Type: Cavalry, Infantry
- Size: Regiment
- Engagements: American Civil War; First Battle of Newtonia (1862); Battle of McGuire's Store (1862); Battle of Prairie Grove (1862); Battle of Mansfield (1864); Battle of Pleasant Hill (1864); Battle of Yellow Bayou (1864)

Commanders
- Notable commanders: Almerine M. Alexander

The 34th Texas Cavalry Regiment was a unit of mounted volunteers from Texas that fought in the Confederate States Army during the American Civil War. Almerine M. Alexander organized the regiment from north Texas recruits in the winter of 1861–1862. The unit marched to Indian Territory in May 1862 where it joined a brigade commanded by Douglas H. Cooper. The regiment fought at Newtonia and McGuire's Store in fall 1862 afterward was dismounted. The regiment served as infantry at Prairie Grove in December 1862. It received orders to transfer to Louisiana in April 1863. The regiment joined a brigade led by Camille de Polignac in July 1863. The following year, the unit fought at Mansfield, Pleasant Hill, and Yellow Bayou during the Red River Campaign. In March 1865 the regiment was assigned to the Texas Infantry Division. Soon after, it marched to Texas where it disbanded in May 1865.

== See also ==
- List of Texas Civil War Confederate units
