= Gobbler, Arkansas =

Unincorporated community in Arkansas, US

Coordinates: 36°11′19″N 93°27′23″W

Gobbler (also known as Gobbler's Point) is an unincorporated community in southern Carroll County, Arkansas, United States. The community is located at the intersection of U.S. Route 412 and Arkansas Highway 103, approximately ten miles south of Green Forest. The location is on a ridge between the headwaters of Piney Creek to the northwest and a small tributary to Osage Creek to the southeast at an elevation of 1,657 ft (505 m).

The community was established in the 1800s by Alexander Wilson, who moved into the area from Tennessee, where he was born in 1825. Wilson provided land for the community school, church and cemetery. The village school was active until the 1940s.
