= Daniel Huston Jr. =

United States Army officer (1824–1884)

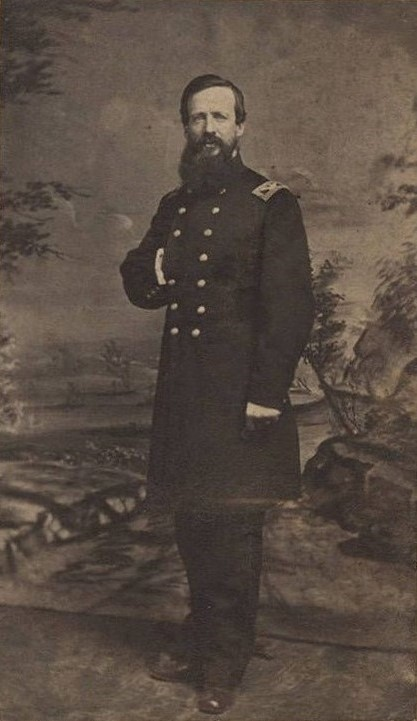
- Born: 1824; Bangor, Maine, US
- Died: December 2, 1884 (aged 59–60); Burlington, New Jersey, US
- Burial place: Arlington National Cemetery
- Military career
- Allegiance: United States; Union
- Branch: Union Army
- Service years: 1843–1882
- Rank: Colonel
- Commands: 7th Missouri Volunteer Cavalry; 5th U.S. Infantry
- Conflicts: American Civil War: Battle of Wilson's Creek; Battle of Prairie Grove; Siege of Vicksburg

Daniel Huston Jr. (1824–1884) was a career soldier in the United States army. Huston served in the infantry in the Regular Army and commanded a volunteer regiment of cavalry during the American Civil War. He retired from the army with the rank of colonel.

== Biography ==
=== Early service ===
Huston entered West Point as a cadet in 1843 and graduated in 1848 with the brevet rank of 2nd lieutenant in the 8th U.S. Infantry. He was fully promoted to 2nd lieutenant the following year and transferred to the 1st U.S. Infantry. On December 8, 1856, he was promoted to captain.

=== Civil War ===
When the Civil War began, Captain Huston served with the 1st Infantry in Missouri, fighting at the Battle of Wilson's Creek. On August 10, 1861, he received a brevet rank of major for his services at Wilson's Creek. Huston's most notable role in the war came on February 21, 1862, when he was appointed colonel of the 7th Missouri Cavalry Regiment. A detachment of the regiment fought at the Battle of Lone Jack, but Huston was not personally involved.

By the winter of 1862, Huston's regiment was part of the 2nd Division of the Army of the Frontier. The regular commander of the 2nd Division, Brig. Gen. James Totten, was called to testify in court at St. Louis, and Huston found himself as senior officer in the entire division. Huston led the 2nd Division at the Battle of Prairie Grove, where it was attached to Brig. Gen. Francis J. Herron's command. Huston's men made an initial charge against a Confederate battery near the Borden House early in the fighting.

Huston remained in command of the 2nd Division for a short while after the battle of Prairie Grove before reverting to his regular army command in the 1st U.S. Infantry. There he participated in the Vicksburg campaign and was awarded a brevet promotion to lieutenant colonel and later, on August 1, 1863, was promoted to major of the 11th U.S. Infantry. On December 30, 1864, he was mustered out of the volunteer service but continued to serve in the regular army.

=== Post Civil War ===
Huston was promoted to colonel of the 5th U.S. Infantry on February 6, 1882, and retired from the service on June 22, 1882. During his service following the Civil War, he commanded the post of Fort Gibson in the Indian Territory. In 1872, Huston constructed Fort McKean in the Dakota Territory, which was later renamed Fort Abraham Lincoln.

Colonel Huston died in Burlington, New Jersey, on December 2, 1884 and is buried in Arlington National Cemetery.
