= 20th Texas Cavalry Regiment =

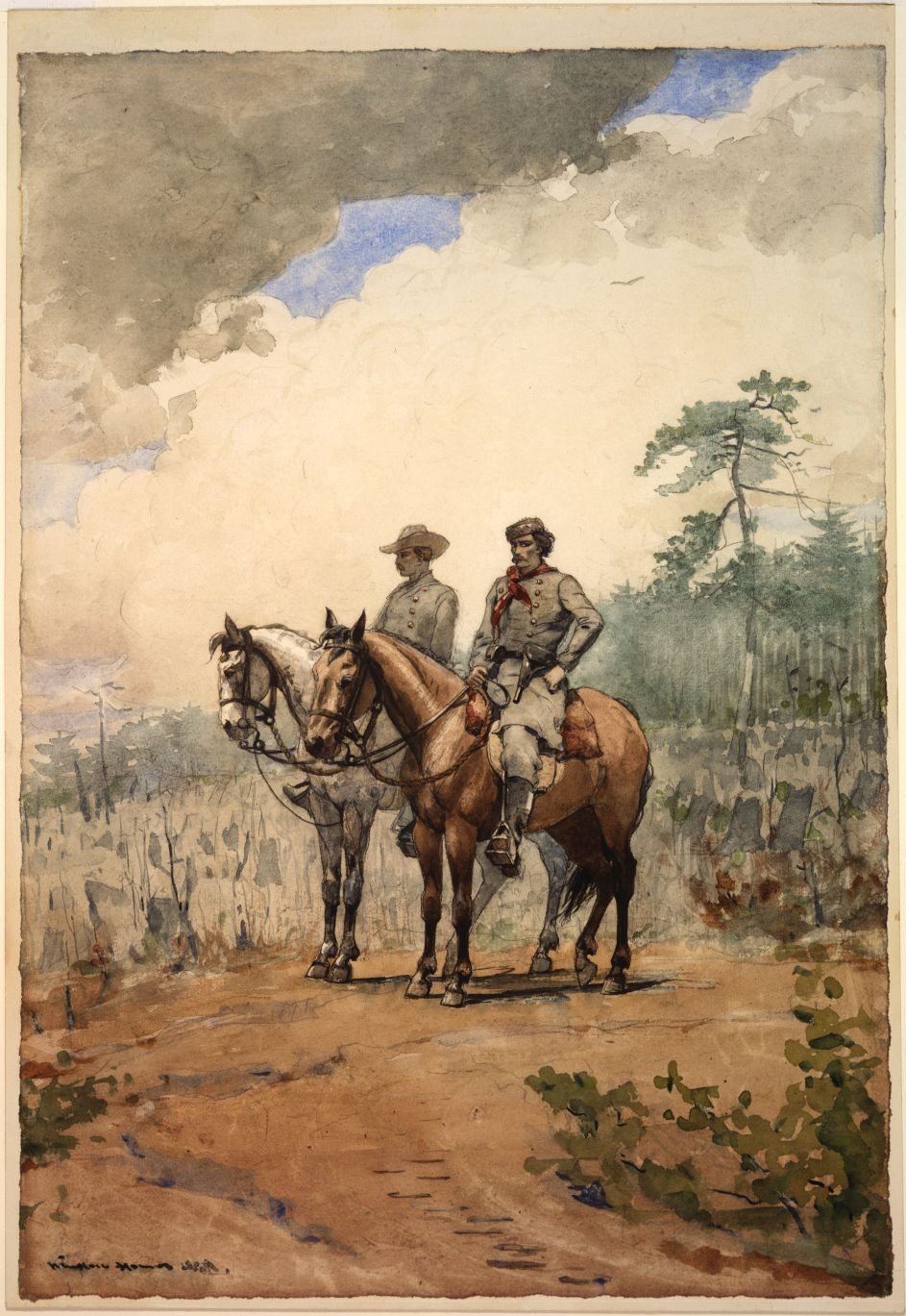
- Two Scouts a Winslow Homer painting
- Active: Spring 1862 – May 1865
- Country: Confederate States of America
- Allegiance: Confederate States of America, Texas
- Branch: Confederate States Army
- Type: Cavalry
- Size: Regiment (850 men, mid-1862)
- Engagements: American Civil War; Battle of McGuire's Store (1862); Battle of Prairie Grove (1862); Battle of Honey Springs (1863); Battle of Bayou Fourche (1863); Battle of Middle Boggy Depot (1864); Battle of Prairie D'Ane (1864); Battle of Poison Springs (1864); Battle of Marks' Mills (1864); Second Battle of Cabin Creek (1864)

Commanders
- Notable commanders: Thomas Coke Bass

The 20th Texas Cavalry Regiment was a unit of mounted volunteers from Texas that fought in the Confederate States Army during the American Civil War. The regiment formed in spring and summer 1862 and served in the Indian Territory and Arkansas for its entire career. In late 1862, it fought at McGuire's Store and Prairie Grove. The regiment fought at Honey Springs and Bayou Fourche in 1863. The unit was in action at Middle Boggy Depot, Prairie D'Ane, Poison Springs, Marks' Mills, and Cabin Creek in 1864. The regiment surrendered to the Union Army in June 1865.

== See also ==
- List of Texas Civil War Confederate units
