= McGuire, Arkansas =

Ghost town in the United States

Coordinates: 36°01′35″N 94°00′30″W

McGuire is an extinct town in Washington County, in the U.S. state of Arkansas. The community is located southeast of Fayetteville on Arkansas Highway 74. The White River flows past the southwest side of the community.

== History ==
A variant name was "Maguires Store". A post office called Maguires Store in operation from 1853 until 1888. The community had the name of George W. Maguire, an early postmaster.
