= Osage Spring =

Spring in Benton County, Arkansas

Coordinates: 36°18′54″N 94°10′50″W

Osage Spring is a spring in Benton County in northwest Arkansas. The spring lies one mile southwest of the city of Rogers. The spring stream flows to the northwest and enters Osage Creek about one quarter mile from its source.

The spring was named for the fact an Osage Indian was killed near it, according to local history.
