= Cross Hollow, Arkansas =

Unincorporated community in Arkansas, US

Coordinates: 36°16′42″N 94°06′48″W

Cross Hollow is an unincorporated community in Benton County, Arkansas, United States.
