= Osage Creek =

Stream in northwest Arkansas, U.S.

Osage Creek is a stream in Benton and Washington counties in northwest Arkansas. It is a tributary of the Illinois River.

The stream headwaters arise just southeast of Rogers (at 36°18′43″N 94°06′17″W) and it flows generally west past the south side of Rogers. It receives the waters of Osage Spring on the southwest side of Rogers. It then flows southwest past the community of Cave Springs. The stream flows through the northwest corner of Washington County and re-enters Benton County. The stream flows west to southwest and enters the Illinois River just north of the community of Pedro (at 36°10′40″N 94°24′14″W).
