= James Totten =

American career military officer (1818–1871)

- Born: September 11, 1818; Pittsburgh, Pennsylvania
- Died: October 1, 1871 (aged 53); Sedalia, Missouri
- Burial place: Crown Hill Cemetery in Sedalia, Missouri
- Relatives: Joseph Totten (uncle); C. A. L. Totten (son)
- Military career
- Allegiance: United States
- Branch: United States Army; Union Army
- Service years: 1841–1870
- Rank: Captain; Lieutenant Colonel; Brevet Brigadier General
- Units: 2nd U.S. Artillery; Missouri Militia (U.S.)
- Commands: Chief of Artillery, Union forces in Missouri; 2nd Division, Army of the Frontier
- Conflicts: Mexican–American War; Seminole Wars; Bleeding Kansas; American Civil War; Surrender of Little Rock Arsenal; Camp Jackson affair; Battle of Boonville; Battle of Dug Springs; Battle of Wilson's Creek; Battle of Fort Blakeley

James Totten (September 11, 1818 – October 1, 1871) was a career American soldier who served in the United States Army and retired from active service in 1870 as the Assistant Inspector General. He served as an officer in the Union Army and Missouri militia general during the American Civil War. He was the nephew of Chief Engineer of the U.S. Army Brigadier General Joseph Totten.

== Early life and career ==
Totten was born in 1818 in Pittsburgh, Pennsylvania, He graduated from the United States Military Academy in 1841 and subsequently became a first lieutenant in 1847, serving in Texas during the Mexican-American War before fighting Seminole Indians in Florida during 1849-50. After attaining the rank of captain in 1855, he went to Bleeding Kansas to try to suppress the disturbances there.

== Civil War service ==
In February 1861, shortly before the American Civil War began, Totten was in command of the Little Rock Arsenal with just 65 men. He was forced to evacuate his forces to St. Louis when about 5,000 pro-secession volunteers led by Governor Henry M. Rector poured into the city and surrounded the federal armoury.

Totten commanded Battery F, 2nd US Artillery under generals Nathaniel Lyon and John C. Frémont in Missouri, fighting at the Camp Jackson Affair, the battle of Boonville, battle of Dug Springs, and the battle of Wilson’s Creek. He was breveted Major for gallant and meritorious conduct at Boonville. He was promoted to lieutenant colonel in September 1861 for gallant conduct at Wilson’s Creek.

He became known for the style which he used to issue orders to his batteries. Punctuated with profanity, a typical order might sound like, "Forward that caisson, G-d d--n you, sir!" It was claimed that some soldiers would walk half a mile just to listen to Totten for five minutes. On February 12, 1862, Totten was promoted to brigadier general in the Missouri Militia. Totten commanded the 2nd Division in the Army of the Frontier in 1862. He was not present with the division when it went into action at the battle of Prairie Grove and was therefore led by Colonel Daniel Huston, Jr. In 1865 Totten commanded the artillery in the Military Division of West Mississippi and participated in the battle of Fort Blakeley.

Following the war, the Army issued a large number of brevet (honorary) promotions to hundreds of officers to recognize their service. Totten received a brevet appointment to the rank of colonel in the Regular Army (United States) 'for gallant and meritorious service during the siege of Mobile, Alabama", to rank from March 13, 1865. On July 17, 1866, President Andrew Johnson nominated Totten for appointment to the rank of brevet brigadier general in the regular army, "for gallant and meritorious service in the field during the war", to rank from March 13, 1865, and the United States Senate confirmed the appointment on July 23, 1866.

== Postbellum ==
After the conclusion of the Civil War, Totten served as Inspector-General of the Military Division of the Atlantic from August 15, 1865 to August 27, 1866, and of the Department of the East, from August 27, 1866, to July 10, 1869 and of the Military Division of the South until April, 1870.

He was promoted to Lieutenant Colonel and Assistant Inspector-General on June 13, 1867.

Totten was dismissed from the Army on July 22, 1870 for "Disobedience of Orders, Neglect of Duty and Conduct to the Prejudice of Good Order and Military Discipline."

Totten died in Sedalia, Missouri, on October 2, 1871, and was buried in Crown Hill Cemetery.

== Family ==
Totten had two sons who attended West Point. The eldest was Charles A.L. Totten, who graduated from West Point in 1873 and served in the Army for 20 years before resigning. After leaving the Army, he authored numerous books on esoteric subjects. The younger was John Reynolds Totten, who graduated from West Point in 1878, was promoted to first lieutenant in 1886 and resigned from the Army on April 1, 1891. After leaving the Army, he pursued his interests in genealogy and hereditary societies.

== See also ==
- List of American Civil War brevet generals (Union)
