= 33rd Arkansas Infantry Regiment =

- Active: 1861–1865
- Country: Confederate States
- Allegiance: Arkansas
- Branch: Confederate States Army
- Type: Infantry
- Size: Regiment
- Part of: Tappan's Brigade
- Nickname: "Grinsted's regiment"
- Facings: Light blue
- Engagements: American Civil War: Battle of Prairie Grove; Battle of Little Rock; Battle of Milliken's Bend; Battle of Mansfield; Battle of Pleasant Hill; Battle of Jenkins' Ferry

The 33rd Arkansas Infantry (1861–1865) was a Confederate Army infantry regiment during the American Civil War. The unit served in the Department of the Trans-Mississippi from its formation in the summer of 1862 until the surrender in May 1865.

== Organization ==
The 33rd Arkansas was created from existing companies by Special Order Number 28, issued by Major General Thomas C. Hindman on July 11, 1862:

The following companies, now rendezvoused at Camden Arks., are incorporated into and will form one regiment of Infantry, in the service of the Confederate States, for three years or the War, to wit:

1. - Captain Arnold’s company, (A)
2. - Captain Davison’s company, (B)
3. - Captain Radford’s company, (C)
4. - Captain Overstreet’s company, (D)
5. - Captain William’s company, (E)
6. - Captain Steele’s company, (F)
7. - Captain Witchell’s company, (G)
8. - Captain Flint’s company, (H)
9. - Captain Ervin’s company, (I)
10.- Captain Langford’s company, (K)

The following field and staff officers are appointed for such regiment.

H. S. Grinstead, Colonel
H. W. McWilliam, Lieut. Colonel
W. S. Crenshaw, Major
John W. Faust, Asst. Qtr. Master
W. Y. Chester, Asst. Commissary Subsistence
A. M. Barnes, Adjt. With rank of Lieut.

These officers will enter at once upon the discharge of their duties and will be obeyed and respected accordingly.

By command of
Maj. Genl. Hindman

These companies were ordered to Camp White Sulphur Springs in mid July 1862 in two battalions which were organized there as the 33rd Arkansas. These two battalions arrived a week or so apart at Sulphur Springs, one in early July and the other after July 15. At one point the regiment included 11 companies. Once the 33rd Arkansas was assembled as a regiment at White Sulphur Springs, it was entered into a camp of instruction under Colonel Robert G. Shaver. The regiment remained at Camp White Sulphur Springs until October 4, 1862, when it was ordered north as part of a brigade commanded by Colonel Shavers. When finally mustered into confederate service the regiment was composed of volunteer companies from the following counties:

- Company A, Commanded by Captain Rufus E Arnold, organized in Columbia County, Arkansas, on May 14, 1862.
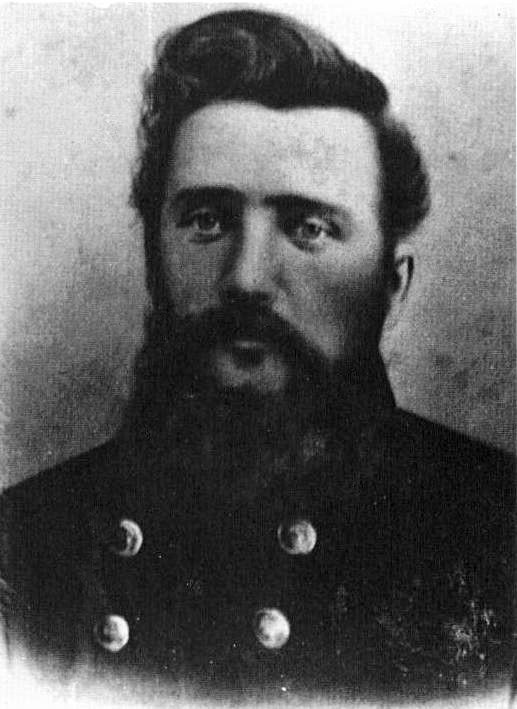
  Grinsted, killed at the Jenkins' Ferry
- Company B, Commanded by Captain Dee Newton, organized in Ouachita County, Arkansas, on June 17, 1862.
- Company C, Commanded by Captain John A. Goodgame, organized in Dallas County, Arkansas, on June 17, 1862.
- Company D, Commanded by Captain Oliver H. Overstreet, organized in Ouachita County, Arkansas, on June 14, 1862.
- Company E, Commanded by Captain Geraldus Williams, organized in Clark County, Arkansas, on June 14, 1862. (Composed partly of former members of other organizations, principally, Company A, 12th Arkansas Infantry Regiment and, Company H, 23rd Arkansas Infantry Regiment)
- Company F, Commanded by Captain John A. Ansley, organized in Ouachita County, Arkansas, on June 18, 1862. (Composed partly of absentees from the 12th and 15th Arkansas Infantry Regiment (Johnson's))
- Company G, Commanded by Captain Wiley M. Mitchell, organized in Columbia County, Arkansas, on June 19, 1862.
- Company H, Commanded by Captain Thomas M. East, organized in Clark County, Arkansas, on May 18, 1862. (Composed of many reenlisted men from other organizations, principally 12th Arkansas Infantry Regiment)
- Company I, Commanded by Captain Francis J. Erwin, organized in Montgomery County, Arkansas, on June 24, 1862. (Seven of this unit reported as former members of the 4th Arkansas Infantry Regiment)
- Company K, Commanded by Captain William B. Langford, organized in Ouachita County, Arkansas, on June 23, 1862.

The regimental officers at the formation of the regiment were:

- Colonel Hiram L. Grinsted, Appointed July 11, 1862, at the age of 36, was born in Kentucky.
- Lieutenant Colonel Henry W. McMillan, Appointed July 11, 1862, at the age of 30, born in North Carolina.
- Major William T. Steele, Age 29, born in Tennessee.
- Surgeon D. S. Williams, Age 27, born in NC. Appointed July 18, 1862.
- Asst Surgeon, Junius N. Bragg, was appointed August 16, 1861, at age 26, and was born in North Carolina.
- Sergeant Major James E. Lide, who enlisted on June 17, 1862, at Camden, AR. He was an escaped POW from the 11th Arkansas Infantry Regiment. Appointed Sgt Major July 10, 1863.

=== African Americans in Confederate Ranks ===
The 33rd Arkansas is one of the few regiments that included the names of African American servants and slaves on its muster rolls. While it was not uncommon for slaves and servants to accompany their masters to war, some even serving on the battlefield, it was uncommon for them to actually be carried on the unit's muster rolls. The following African Americans are included on the 33rd Arkansas Infantry Regiment's Muster rolls:

Company A - "DOCK -Negro. - Enl 1 Nov 1863 at Camp Bragg, AR. Present 28 Feb 1864."
Company B - "ABRAHAM Cook Enl Jan 1864 at Camp Bragg, AR. Present 29 Feb 1864"

"MOSE, - (Slave) Cook Enl 1 Dec 1863 at Camp Bragg, AR. Present 29 Feb 1864."
"NELSON - slave Cook Enl 1 Dec 1863 at Camp Bragg, AR. Present 29 Feb 1864."

Company C - "LIDE, AMOS Negro Cook - Enl 1 Nov 1863 at Camp Bragg, AR for 3 yrs. Present through Feb 1864."

"McCALLUM, EDWARD Negro Cook. Enl 1Nov1863 at Camp Bragg, AR. On sick furlough 15days 25Feb1864."
"McCOLLUM, ARCHY Negro Cook. Enl 15Dec1863 at Camp Bragg, AR. Died 4Jan1864."

Company G - "ALBERT Cook Enl 20 Nov 1863 at Camp Bragg, AR. Present slave cook."

"LINDSEY - Cook Enl 20 Nov 1862 at Camp Bragg, AR. Slave cook."

Company K - "JACK" Cook - Enl 26 Oct 186(3) at Camp Bragg, AR. Present 29 Feb 1864."

"NICK, - Cook Enl 26 Oct 1862. Present, never paid, 29 Feb 1864."

== Battles ==
=== Prairie Grove Campaign ===
The 33rd Arkansas was assigned to Colonel Robert G. Shaver's 2nd Brigade of Daniel M. Frost's 3rd Division of Major General Thomas C. Hindman's 1st Corps of the Army of the Trans-Mississippi for the Battle of Prairie Grove on December 7, 1862. The other regiments in the brigade were the 27th, 38th, and Adams' Arkansas Infantry Regiments. According to Colonel Robert G. Shaver's report on the Battle of Prairie Grove, the 38th was ordered to support Colonel Dandridge McRae's Brigade during the fight at Prairie Grove.

Camp near Fort Smith, Ark., Dec. 15, 1862.

Dear Sisters—This leaves me still sick, but some better than when I wrote you last. The fatigue of crossing the Boston Mountains was great. We left Van Buren on the 3rd of this month, with five days’ rations, to attack the enemy, who were then at Cane Hill, in some force, but on the night of the 6th General Hindman was informed that he was in eight miles of General Schofield, with about ten thousand troops. After receiving the intelligence, General Hindman ordered that we be ready to move at one o’clock the next morning.

The cavalry was thrown out ahead of the infantry, and about an hour by the sun on the morning of the 7th, which was Sunday, our cavalry engaged the enemy. When the firing commenced we were ordered up in double-quick, but before we got where the engagement took place we met some of our men coming back with a good many prisoners and wagons which they had captured.

When we got to where the engagement took place we were thrown into line of battle, but we soon found the enemy had fallen back. We then advanced about half a mile and formed again, but they had fallen back still further. About eleven o’clock the firing commenced in good earnest on the right wing. We were then ordered away from the battery and ordered out into the woods in center and were under cross-fire from two of the enemy’s batteries all the evening, but they had their sights too high for us. About two o’clock we were charged by the Pin Indians, who set up one of the most horrible yells I ever heard. We received their charge, repulsed them and then charged them and drove them back with a loss of two killed, eleven wounded and twelve missing, most of whom have come up since. I did not get a man hurt at all, but the way the shot and shell rained down on us it looked like we could not escape as well as we did. I think we will winter some distance south of here.

I will close as my paper is out. My love to all.

Good bye from your brother,

TOM D. THOMSON.

After Prairie Grove the unit retreated to Van Buren, with the rest of Hindman's Army. On February 28, 1863, Brigadier General J. C. Tappan, formerly commander of the 13th Arkansas Infantry Regiment, was ordered to assume command of Shaver's brigade, consisting of the 38th Arkansas Infantry Regiment, commanded by Colonel Robert G. Shaver, the 27th Arkansas Infantry Regiment commanded by Colonel James R. Shaler, and the 33rd Arkansas Infantry Regiment commanded by Colonel Hiram L. Grinsted. They remained with Tappan's Brigade through the remainder of the war.

=== Summer 1863 ===
General Tappan was ordered to move his brigade to Louisiana to support General Taylor's operations against General's Grant's forces laying siege to Vicksburg Mississippi. The 33rd spent the month of July 1863 in the vicinity of Delhi, Louisiana, where they conducted raids on Federal interests between Delhi and the Mississippi River. Tappan's Brigade was present at the Battle of Goodrich's Landing on June 29, 1863, where they helped force the capitulation of two companies of the 1st Arkansas Infantry, African Descent. Tappan's Brigade and the 33rd Arkansas missed the Battle of Helena on July 4, 1863, because of its operations in Louisiana. Tappan's brigade was ordered to return to Arkansas, via Pine Bluff, in August 1863. Tappan's Brigade and the 33rd returned to Arkansas in August 1863, and participated in the defense of Little Rock. When Little Rock fell on September 10, 1863, the regiment withdrew to southern Arkansas and went into winter quarters in Hempstead County.

=== Red River Campaign ===
In the Spring of 1864, Churchill's Division, including Tappan's Brigade moved south to oppose Union General Nathaniel Banks' Red River Campaign in north-central Louisiana in March and early April 1864. The division arrived during the Battle of Mansfield on April 8, 1864, but was not committed to the battle and occupied a position on the flank of General Taylor's division. Brigadier General Churchill was placed in command of both his own division and Brigadier General Parson's Division during the pursuit of the enemy from Mansfield to Pleasant Hill, Louisiana, so Brigadier General Tappan assumed command of Churchill's Division. While Tappan commanded the Division, Colonel Grinsted assumed command of Tappan's Brigade and led it through the fight at Pleasant Hill, on April 9, 1864. General Tappan described the action at Pleasant Hill as follows:

My line was formed at about 4:30 o'clock. . . . I threw out three companies of skirmishers under Major Steele of Grinsted's regiment, and immediately ordered my line to advance rapidly as directed. . . . For an hour and a half we were as warmly engaged with the enemy as it has ever been my experience to witness on any battlefield. My division, however, never faltered, but moved steadily forward, with the valor of men determined to succeed or fall in the attempt. . . . At this juncture, learning that the division on the right had been outflanked and was falling back, I immediately directed my attention in that direction and saw that such was the case. When said division had swept entirely past mine, and my command became exposed to a heavy and murderous fire from the flank as well as from the front, I ordered the brigade commanders to fall back with a view of forming a line in a more advantageous position. . . . The exhausted condition of the men, the lateness of the hour (it being near dark), and the denseness of the thicket made it extremely difficult to rally the men. While the battle lasted no men ever fought more gallantly. This is evidenced by the fact that the enemy made little or no attempt to pursue our line; on the contrary, he fled toward Red river as soon as night came, leaving his dead to be buried and his wounded to be cared by us. The loss of the division in the engagement was as follows: Killed, 26; wounded, 112; missing, 63.

Churchill's Division marched back north into Arkansas to deal with the other part of the Federal advance, General Frederick Steele's Camden Expedition. The division arrived after a long forced march at Woodlawn, Arkansas, on April 26, where they rested overnight, then joined the pursuit of Steele's retreating army, catching it trying to cross the Saline River near Jenkins' Ferry. The regimental commander, Colonel Hiram Lane Grinsted, was killed in action at Jenkins' Ferry. The regiment sustained 92 men killed and wounded in the fight at Jenkins' Ferry. The regiment was engaged in the following battles:

- Battle of Prairie Grove, Arkansas, December 7, 1862.
- Battle of Little Rock, Arkansas, September 10, 1863.
- Red River Campaign, Arkansas March–May, 1864.
- Battle of Pleasant Hill, April 9, 1864.
- Battle of Jenkins' Ferry, Arkansas April 30, 1864.

Following Colonel Grinsted's death at Jenkins Ferry, Lieutenant Colonel Thomas David Thomson (originally first lieutenant of Co. B) was promoted to colonel, commanding 33rd Arkansas, to rank from April 30, 1864.

=== Close of the war ===
On 1 September 1864, Brigadier General James C. Tappan reported that Colonel Thompson's regiment was assigned to Tappan's Brigade. On the same day Brigadier General Tappan reported that the assigned strength of Hardy's Regiment 19th Arkansas Infantry Regiment (Hardy's) and Thompson's Regiment was 787 men, of which only 373 were armed.

On 30 September 1864, General Kirby Smith's report on the organization of the Army of the Trans-Mississippi lists the 33rd Arkansas, under the command of Lieutenant Colonel Thompson, as belonging to Brigadier General James C. Tappan's, 3rd Brigade of Acting Major General Thomas J. Churchill's 1st Arkansas Infantry Division of Major General John B. Magruder's 2nd Army Corps. On 17 November 1864, a union spy reported that the Tampan's Brigade and Churchill's Division was in the vicinity of Camden, in Ouachita County, Arkansas.

On 31 December 1864, General Kirby Smith's report on the organization of his forces lists the 33rd Arkansas, under the command of Colonel Thompson as belonging to Brigadier General James C. Tappan's, 3rd Brigade of Acting Major General Thomas J. Churchill's 1st Arkansas Infantry Division of Major General John B. Magruder's 2nd Army Corps, Confederate Army of the Trans-Mississippi.

On 22 January 1865, Major General Churchill was ordered to move his division to Minden, Louisiana, and occupy winter quarters. Union commanders in the Department of the Gulf reported on March 20, 1865, that General Tappan's brigade minus Shaver's regiment, was located a Minden, Louisiana, with the rest of Churchill's Division. In early April 1865, the division concentrated near Shreaveport Louisiana, and then moved to Marshall Texas by mid April 1865.

== Surrender ==
By late April, news of the surrender of General Lee's army had made it to the Army of the Trans-Mississippi. Captain Junius Newport Bragg, the 27 year old assistant surgeon of the 33rd Arkansas Regiment, in camp near Marshall, Texas, wrote to his wife in Camden, on Sunday, April 23, two weeks after Appomattox:

I have not felt so bad since the war began. To realize that the independence of our country is gone, was a shock I was little prepared for. Well, so be it, it is God's will. General E. K. Smith is in favor of continuing the war. The army supports him. There is an army here sufficient to worry the yankees for a long time and, if independence is beyond such, he may obtain an honorable place. When thoughts of submission come into our minds we should think of yankee subjugation and the mortification of defeat and fight on a little longer.

But as the news of the failure in the east set in, desertions became rampant in the Army. Captain Bragg wrote again on May 20, still at Marshall, reporting:

There are 132 men, rank and file, left in the regiment. They will, of course, go as it suits them. Every one, citizen and soldier, is completely demoralized. The thing will not last much longer. All the officers are burning their papers today. Alas, for our country - Ruin stares in the face. I do not wish to speak of it. It is too much for me!

The regiment was covered by the formal surrender of the Department of the Trans-Mississippi, General E. Kirby Smith commanding, May 26, 1865. With few exceptions, the Arkansas Infantry regiments in the Trans-Mississippi simply disbanded without formally surrendering. When the Trans-Mississippi Department surrendered, all of the Arkansas infantry regiments were encamped in and around Marshall, Texas (war-ravaged Arkansas no longer able to subsist the army). The regiments were ordered to report to Shreveport, Louisiana, to be paroled but none of them did so. Some individual soldiers went to Shreveport on their own to be paroled, others reported to Union garrisons at Fort Smith, Pine Bluff or Little Rock to receive their paroles, but for the most part, the men simply went home.

== See also ==
- List of Confederate units from Arkansas
- Confederate Units by State
