= Van Buren raid =

1862 raid of the American Civil War

- Part of the American Civil War
Date	December 28, 1862
Location	Crawford County, Arkansas 35°26′40″N 94°20′48″W
Result	Union victory

Belligerents
United States	(Confederate States of America) Confederate States

Commanders and leaders
James G. Blunt; Francis J. Herron	Theophilus Holmes; Thomas C. Hindman

Units involved
Army of the Frontier	First Corps, Army of the Trans-Mississippi

Strength
8,000	5,000

Casualties and losses
1 killed and 5 wounded or 2 killed and 6 wounded	Unknown, roughly 12 killed, 24 wounded, and several hundred captured
- Location within Arkansas

The Van Buren raid occurred in Crawford County, Arkansas, on December 28, 1862, during the American Civil War. After defeating Confederate forces led by Major General Thomas C. Hindman at the Battle of Prairie Grove on December 7, 1862, Union forces under Brigadiers General James G. Blunt and Francis J. Herron prepared for a raid against the Confederate positions at Van Buren and Fort Smith. Disease, lack of supplies, and desertion had previously forced Hindman to begin withdrawing most of his force from the area. Setting out on December 27, the Union troops struck an outlying Confederate cavalry unit near Drippings Spring, north of Van Buren, on the morning of December 28. The Confederate cavalry fled to Van Buren, which was then overrun by Union troops.

The Union pursued and captured three steamboats on the Arkansas River, and captured some Confederate troops and many supplies in Van Buren. Across the river in Fort Smith, the Confederates destroyed supplies and also burned two steamboats trapped upriver. An artillery duel took place at Van Buren, and after nightfall a minor skirmish was fought downriver at Strain's Landing. After the raid, Hindman withdrew his men to Little Rock and the Union force returned from the raid, unable to maintain a supply line to Van Buren across the Boston Mountains. The battle of Prairie Grove and the Van Buren raid broke Confederate strength in the region.

== Background ==
After the election of Abraham Lincoln as President of the United States in 1860, several southern states considered seceding from the union. In the southern state of Arkansas, anti-secessionists were initially strong, slavery being considered a key issue. The successful bombardment of Fort Sumter by Confederate troops in seceded territory on April 12 swung political opinion toward secession. The state convention voted to secede on May 6, and Arkansas joined the Confederate States of America.

After significant military activity in Missouri throughout 1861, Major General Earl Van Dorn of the Confederate States Army formed the Army of the West in Arkansas in early March 1862 from forces commanded by Missouri State Guard Major General Sterling Price and Confederate Brigadier General Ben McCulloch. Van Dorn moved his army north towards the Union army of Major General Samuel R. Curtis, but was defeated at the Battle of Pea Ridge on March 7 and 8. After the defeat at Pea Ridge, Van Dorn moved most of the Confederate soldiers and supplies in Arkansas east of the Mississippi River and into Tennessee, leaving very little military organization in the state. In May, Major General Thomas C. Hindman was placed in command of Confederate forces in the state, with a task of rebuilding Confederate strength in the area. Although Hindman was successful in rebuilding Confederate strength and stabilizing the military situation in Arkansas, his methods were unpopular and sometimes extralegal. He was replaced by Major General Theophilus Holmes, who arrived at Little Rock on August 12.

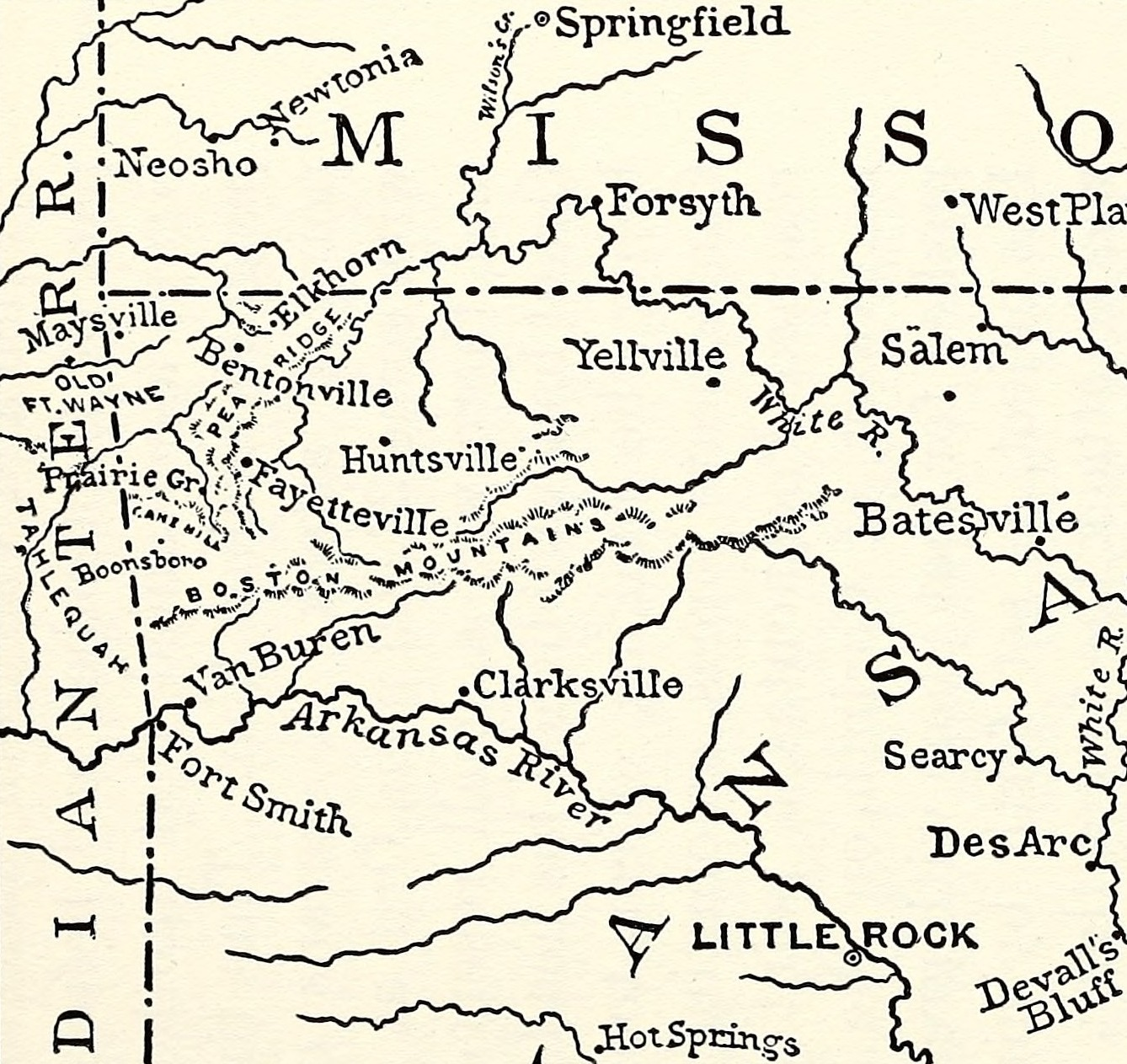
A map of northwestern Arkansas, showing locations significant to the American Civil War

Hindman retained a field command under Holmes and pushed the troops under his command into northern Arkansas and southwestern Missouri. His command was known as the First Corps of the Army of the Trans-Mississippi. Holmes had Hindman return to Little Rock in September, leaving his troops where they were. A militia officer, Brigadier General James S. Rains of the Missouri State Guard, commanded in Hindman's absence. Despite winning the First Battle of Newtonia under the command of Colonel Douglas H. Cooper and Joseph O. Shelby, the Confederates in southwestern Missouri withdrew in early October as Union troops commanded by Brigadier Generals James G. Blunt and John Schofield approached. The Union commands were then combined by Schofield into the Army of the Frontier. Hindman returned from Little Rock on October 15. Some of Schofield's men had entered Arkansas, but in early November, Schofield withdrew all of them except for Blunt's division to Springfield, Missouri. Hindman decided to attack with the Union forces divided, and after his cavalry fought with Blunt in the Battle of Cane Hill, began moving north across the Boston Mountains on December 3. The mountains were high, rugged, and brushy. Union troops commanded by Brigadier General Francis J. Herron began a long movement from Springfield on December 4 to reinforce Blunt.

Late on December 6, Hindman learned that Herron had arrived to reinforce Blunt and would be in the area the next day. In response, Hindman changed his plan to strike Herron first at Prairie Grove and then attack Blunt. Instead of acting aggressively against Herron as planned on December 7, Hindman took up a defensive position and awaited Herron's assault. Hindman's men fought with Herron's until Blunt's men arrived and turned the tide for the Union. Hindman realized that his battered army did not have enough food or ammunition to fight again, and with the Union having been reinforced, fell back to Van Buren beginning the night after the battle. Forage for horses was scarce in the Van Buren area, and Hindman sent some of his cavalry, commanded by Brigadier General John S. Marmaduke, 100 miles (160 km) to the south to Lewisburg. While at Van Buren, Hindman's force also suffered greatly from disease and desertion. Van Buren was located on the north bank of the Arkansas River, with Fort Smith to the southwest on the south bank of the river. The Arkansas River provided a key communication and transportation pathway in a state largely devoid of infrastructure and the Arkansas River Valley was an agricultural area important for feeding the Confederate army. North of the river were the Boston Mountains.

== Early maneuvers ==
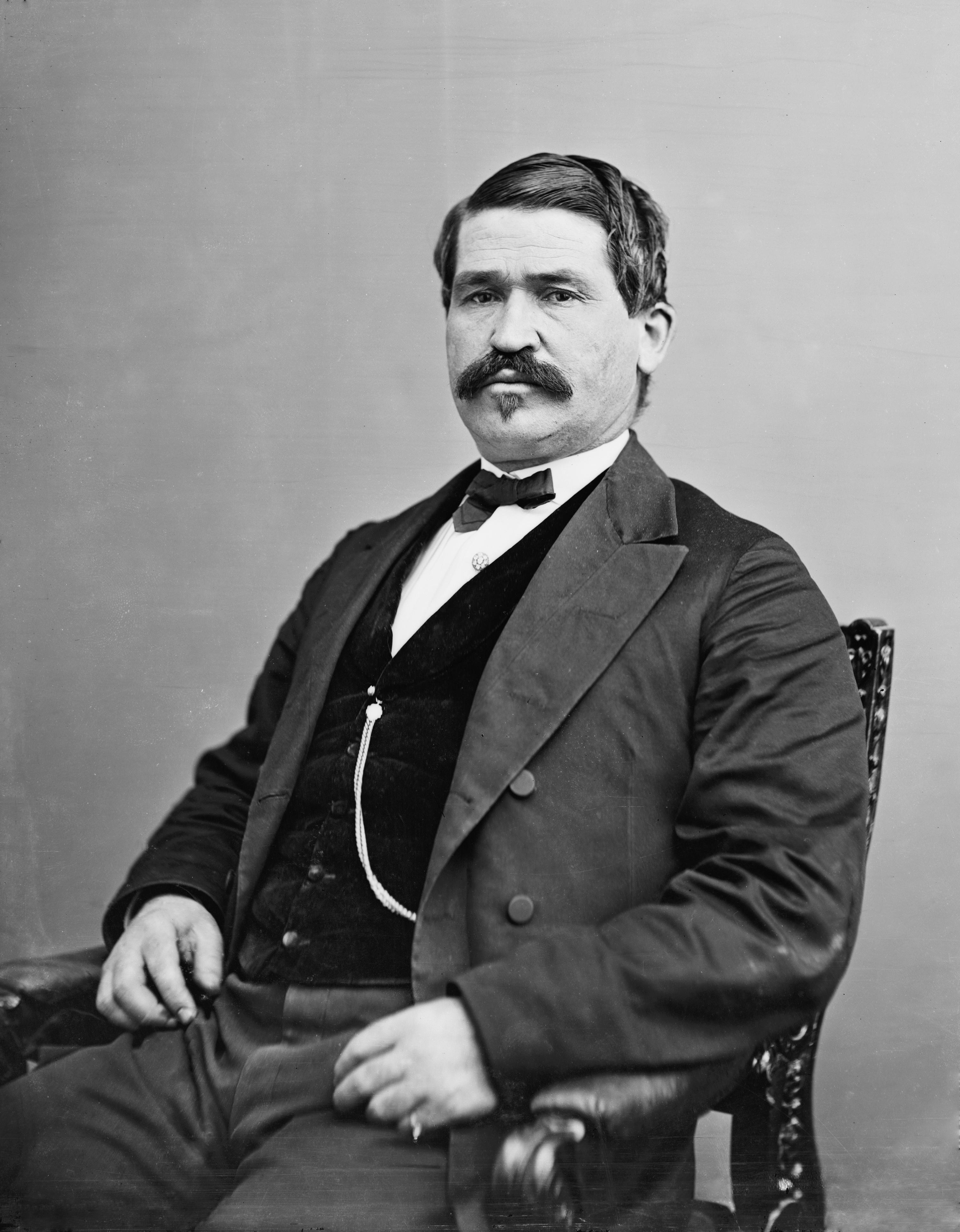
Brigadier General James G. Blunt, commander of the Union raid on Van Buren

Hindman decided that it would be impractical to keep the majority of his force north of the Arkansas River in Van Buren given the condition of his army, and pulled most of his men south of the Arkansas to Fort Smith. Hindman left one infantry regiment and some artillery in Van Buren. The 1st Texas Partisan Rangers, commanded by Lieutenant Colonel Richard Phillip Crump was posted at Dripping Springs, which was about 8 miles (13 km) north of Van Buren, with instructions to guard the roads from the north, despite Crump having previously been reprimanded for inattentiveness. Holmes visited the Van Buren area on December 21, and ordered Hindman to withdraw his forces to Lewisburg, where the men could be better supplied via the river. According to historian Ed Bearss, Hindman decided to leave the brigades of Brigadier General John S. Roane's Texas cavalry and Cooper's Native American troops in the area of Fort Smith and the Indian Territory, although Roane's brigade was soon disbanded due to heavy desertion and was replaced with a brigade of Arkansas infantry commanded by Colonel Robert G. Shaver. Shea instead states that the forces left behind were one infantry brigade and one cavalry regiment. Hindman began to move the sick and any supplies not needed for the rearguard out of Fort Smith on December 23. The main Confederate force began withdrawing on December 26, and were still loading supplies onto river transports without a sense of urgency on December 28. On December 28, there were about 5,000 Confederates in the area, primarily south of the Arkansas River.

After resting for three days following Prairie Grove, Herron and Blunt decided to move south against Hindman with 8,000 men, although this movement was delayed by a heavy snowstorm. The weather eventually broke, and late on December 25, the two Union officers decided it was time to resume the advance. After spreading disinformation on December 26, that the Union thrust was headed for Huntsville, the movement began the next morning, with 8,000 men and 30 cannons. The Union troops traveled during cold weather and over ground that was in places covered with snow. Artillery and wagons had difficulty moving through thick mud. The commands of Blunt and Herron traveled separately, taking different routes.

== Raid ==
On the morning of the 28th, Blunt's cavalry was at the head of his force. The cavalry halted at Oliver's Store on the Telegraph Road for Blunt's infantry and artillery to catch up. Herron's cavalry joined Blunt's at the store, and Herron and Blunt interviewed local Unionists to learn of the locations of Crump's camp and outposts. Herron's infantry had not arrived yet, but he had 3,000 cavalrymen present. Blunt had seniority over Herron and took overall command. With the 2nd Kansas Cavalry Regiment in the lead, the Union cavalrymen headed south, and 2 miles (3 km) from the store and 8 miles (13 km) from Dripping Springs, encountered some of Crump's pickets. Blunt ordered the cavalry to drive all the way to the Arkansas River. Crump heard the firing and took two companies to investigate. Encountering the 2nd Kansas Cavalry 3 miles (5 km) north of their camp, Crump's patrol fled back to the camp. By the time Crump returned to prepare his surprised men for battle, the Union troopers were almost upon them. Three Union units – the 2nd Kansas Cavalry, the 6th Kansas Cavalry Regiment, and the 3rd Wisconsin Cavalry Regiment – were deployed around 10:00 am, and Colonel William F. Cloud brought up two mountain howitzers. After six rounds from the cannons, the Union cavalry charged. Crump's Texans quickly fled, and although Crump managed to rally a force three times, the Union cavalry drove all the way to Van Buren in only an hour.

The pursuing cavalry, led by Cloud, halted at a hill overlooking the Arkansas River, allowing Blunt and Herron to personally catch up to the force. When the Union troops charged down the hill, Herron sent part of the 1st Missouri Cavalry Regiment to the east to cut off a road that the Confederates could use to retreat. By the time the Union troops entered Van Buren, most of the Confederates had already boarded steamboats on the Arkansas River or were using a ferry to cross the river. Some convalescent soldiers and men from the commissary and quartermaster departments were captured by the Union soldiers in Van Buren. The steamboats withdrawing down the river had been loaded with some of Hindman's supplies before the Union attack struck, and to speed their escape, some of the cargo was thrown overboard.

Scouts informed Blunt that there was a bend in the river 2 miles (3 km) below Van Buren, and Cloud was sent there with a brigade and two cannons to try to intercept the steamboats. The rearmost ship, Frederick Notrebe, was caught by the 2nd Kansas Cavalry. According to Shea, the Kansans fired into the ship, forcing its crew's surrender; Bearss states that the ship's crew intentionally ran the ship aground and abandoned the vessel. Two more steamers, Rose Douglass (Note: Also spelled Rose Douglas.) and Key West continued downriver. Rose Douglass was fired on and then boarded by Union cavalry, and Key West surrendered at Strain's Landing 6 miles (10 km) or 10 miles (16 km) below Van Buren. The vessel had stopped at the landing for unknown reasons and was then caught up to by Union cavalry.

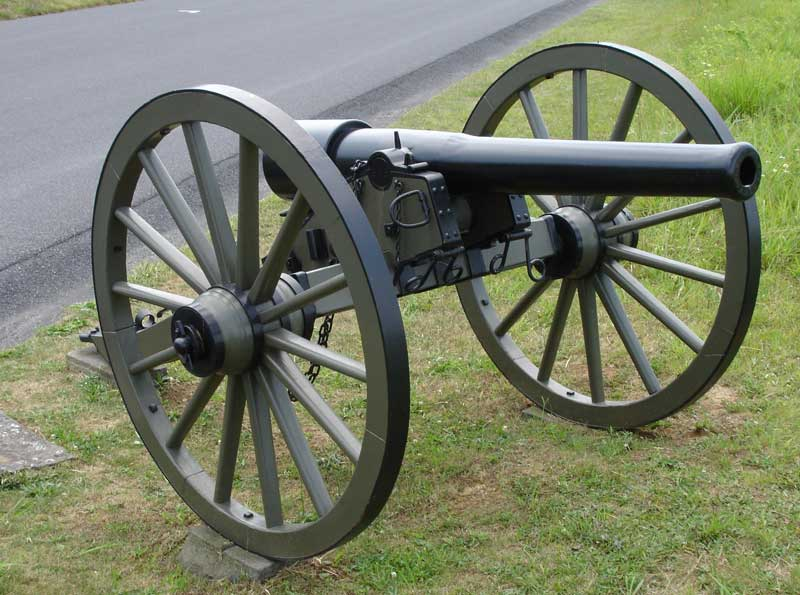
A 10-pounder Parrott rifle, of the type used by the 1st Kansas Battery during the raid

One of the Union mountain howitzers fired on the ferry at Van Buren, killing the horse powering it, although the soldiers on board were able to escape across the river. Union troops also captured the steamer Violet in Van Buren, and took three ammunition wagons and twenty-seven wagons with supplies during the chase of the other steamboats. Rose Douglass, Key West, and Frederick Notrebe were returned to Van Buren by the early afternoon. While Blunt and Herron discussed the prospects of making an attack across the river to Fort Smith, the Confederates brought up troops on the far side of the river. At Fort Smith, Hindman had learned of the Union attack at about 10:00 am. He ordered Shaver's brigade, which was 2 miles (3 km) away, to go to Fort Smith, and ordered Brigadier General Daniel M. Frost, who was with his division 10 miles (16 km) toward Little Rock, to send a detachment of infantry and artillery to Strain's Landing and the rest of his force to Fort Smith. By the time Shaver reached Fort Smith, Union troops had already held Van Buren for about two and a half hours. Shaver had West's Arkansas Battery fire on the town with four 6-pounder smoothbore cannons. Herron viewed this as an outrage, as the town sheltered many civilians as well as the Union troops. The Confederates fired for two hours, and Union artillery was brought up to support the infantry. The 1st Kansas Battery deployed on the hill overlooking the river and fired into Shaver's position at about 4:00 pm with four 10-pounder Parrott rifles. Shaver had not expected to encounter Union artillery, and with Union overshots landing among Shaler's Arkansas Infantry Regiment, ordered a withdrawal. The Union artillery did not detect the retreat and continued firing, while the Union infantry completed its march to Van Buren at about 7:00 pm.

An hour after dark, Cloud sent the 2nd Kansas Cavalry and 1st Kansas Battery back down to Strain's Landing, where he had noticed a Confederate camp during the chase after the steamboats. When the Union units arrived, the position was held by Tilden's Missouri Battery and part of Hunter's Missouri Infantry Regiment, that had been sent there by Frost. According to Bearss, the Confederate artillery fired upon the Union positions until driven off by the Kansan artillery; Shea states that the Confederates were under orders not to waste ammunition and withdrew after the start of the Union bombardment. Two Confederate transports had been trapped upstream by the Union attack, and were burned. Hindman had given orders to abandon Fort Smith and if necessary, burn it. After the Union attack struck Van Buren, the Confederates panicked and burned wharves and warehouses in Fort Smith. In the words of Shea, Hindman's orders were carried out with "more enthusiasm and less judgment" than intended.

== Aftermath ==
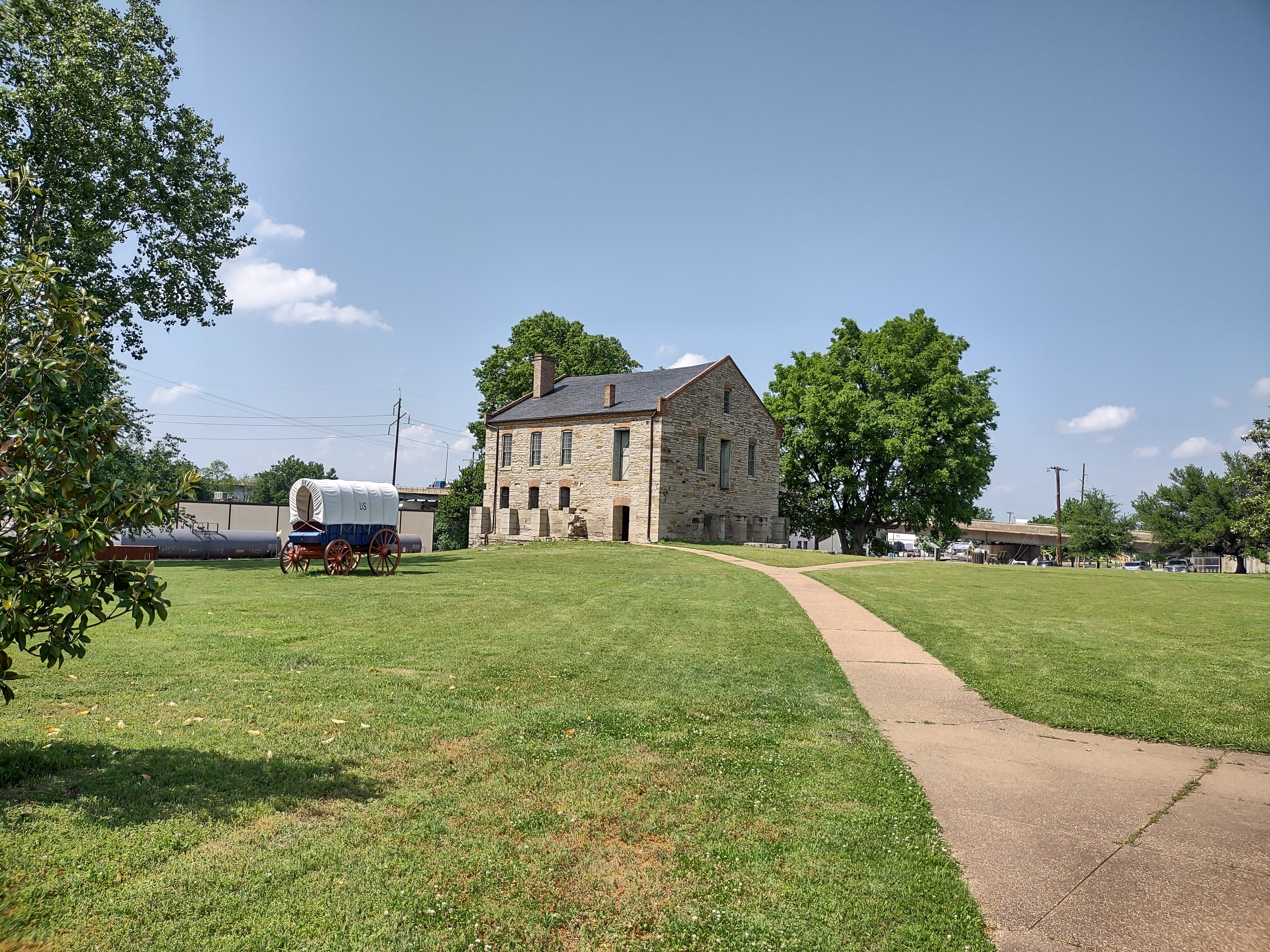
Civil War-era commissary building at Fort Smith

Convinced that he could not hold Fort Smith against a Union assault, and with everything worth protecting destroyed, Hindman decided to withdraw, leaving only Cooper's brigade and two cavalry regiments in the general area to harass the Union troops. On the morning of December 29, Blunt sent a scouting party across the river, which found that the only Confederates remaining at Fort Smith were 600 sick and wounded. A Union patrol was sent to burn the two transports upriver, but found that the Confederates had already done so. The Union forces held a military parade that day to impress the local civilians. The Union troops freed several hundred slaves. Supplies that could be sent northward were carried off, and anything they could not carry, including a large quantity of corn, the ferry, and the steamboats, was burned. Blunt, Herron, Colonel Daniel Huston Jr., and 14 men from the 1st Missouri Cavalry briefly crossed the Arkansas river, apparently so that Blunt, Herron, and Huston could claim that they were the first Union officers to cross it. Union troops found Confederate messages in a telegraph office, garnering a significant amount of military intelligence. Overall, the Confederates had lost 25,000 bushels of grain, 42 wagons, and quantities of equipment and ammunition.

Blunt could not operate a supply line across the Boston Mountains, and decided to withdraw that day. Herron led the withdrawal with the infantry and artillery, leaving after sunset. Schofield caught up with the expedition during Herron's withdrawal, but allowed Blunt to remain in command despite Schofield being the senior officer. Blunt left Van Buren with the cavalry on December 30, and the raid was over by the next day, when the Union troops arrived at Rhea's Mill. According to Shea, Union losses were two killed and six wounded; the Encyclopedia of Arkansas reports Union losses of one man killed and five wounded. Confederate losses are not known, but Shea estimates about a dozen were killed, two dozen wounded, and a few hundred captured and then paroled. By January 8, 1863, only parts of two Confederate cavalry regiments and one infantry regiment remained at Fort Smith. Holmes ordered Hindman to abandon the Fort Smith area, and the Confederates spent the beginning of 1863 retreating to Little Rock. Cooper's men went to the Indian Territory, and a small force led by William Steele remained at Forth Smith; Union troops captured the post on September 1, 1863. The battle of Prairie Grove and the Van Buren raid had broken Confederate strength in the region; the writer Shelby Foote wrote that "practically speaking, [Hindman] had no army". Cavalry raids and guerrilla warfare continued in the area, but fighting between large-scale armies did not occur in the region after Prairie Grove and Van Buren.

== Sources ==
- Bearss, Edwin C. (1967). "The Federals Raid Van Buren and Threaten Fort Smith". Arkansas Historical Quarterly. 26 (2): 123–142. doi:10.2307/40027605. JSTOR 40027605.
- Bearss, Edwin C.; Gibson, Arrell Morgan (1969). Fort Smith: Little Gibraltar on the Arkansas. Norman, Oklahoma: University of Oklahoma Press. OCLC 248031029.
- Castel, Albert E. (1997) [1958]. Civil War Kansas: Reaping the Whirlwind. Lawrence, Kansas: University Press of Kansas. ISBN 978-0-7006-0872-0.
- Christ, Mark K. (2010). Civil War Arkansas 1863: The Battle for a State. Norman, Oklahoma: University of Oklahoma Press. ISBN 978-0-8061-4433-7.
- Foote, Shelby (1986) [1963]. The Civil War: A Narrative. Vol. 2: Fredericksburg to Meridian. New York: Vintage Books. ISBN 0-394-74621-X.
- Hess, Earl J.; Hatcher, Richard W.; Piston, William Garrett; Shea, William L. (2006). Wilson's Creek, Pea Ridge, and Prairie Grove: A Battlefield Guide with a Section on Wire Road. Lincoln, Nebraska: University of Nebraska Press. ISBN 978-0-8032-7366-5.
- McPherson, James M. (1998). "Fort Sumter I, South Carolina". In Kennedy, Frances H. (ed.). The Civil War Battlefield Guide (2nd ed.). Boston/New York: Houghton Mifflin. pp. 1–4. ISBN 978-0-395-74012-5.
- Neal, Diane; Kremm, Thomas W. (1993). Lion of the South: General Thomas C. Hindman. Macon, Georgia: Mercer University Press. ISBN 0-86554-422-0.
- Official Records of the Union and Confederate Armies in the War of the Rebellion. Vol. 22. Washington, D.C.: Government Printing Office. 1888.
- Piston, William Garrett; Rutherford, John C. (2021). "We Gave Them Thunder": Marmaduke's Raid and the Civil War in Missouri and Arkansas. Springfield, Missouri: Ozarks Studies Institute. ISBN 978-1-7346290-1-9.
- Shea, William L. (1994). "1862: "A Continual Thunder"". In Christ, Mark K. (ed.). Rugged and Sublime: The Civil War in Arkansas. Fayetteville, Arkansas: University of Arkansas Press. pp. 22–58. ISBN 1-55728-356-7.
- Shea, William L. (2009). Fields of Blood: The Prairie Grove Campaign. Chapel Hill, North Carolina: University of North Carolina Press. ISBN 978-0-8078-3315-5.
- Shea, William L.; Hess, Earl J. (1998). "Pea Ridge, Arkansas". In Kennedy, Frances H. (ed.). The Civil War Battlefield Guide (2nd ed.). Boston/New York: Houghton Mifflin. pp. 34–37. ISBN 978-0-395-74012-5.
