= 38th Arkansas Infantry Regiment =

38th Arkansas Infantry (Confederate)
- Active: 1862–1865
- Country: Confederate States
- Allegiance: Arkansas
- Branch: Army
- Type: Infantry
- Size: Regiment
- Facings: Light blue
- Engagements: Battle of Prairie Grove Battle of Little Rock Red River Campaign, Battle of Pleasant Hill, Battle of Jenkins Ferry,

The 38th Arkansas Infantry (1862–1865) was a Confederate Army infantry regiment during the American Civil War. The unit was often referred to as Shaver's Arkansas Infantry. The unit served in the Department of the Trans-Mississippi from its formation in the summer of 1862 until its surrender in May 1865.

== Organization ==
38th Infantry Regiment began when General Hindman issued Special Order Number #12, Army of the Southwest, dated June 22, 1862, which authorized a Captain W. C. Adams to raise one or more companies of mounted infantry in Lawrence and Randolph Counties and to immediately attack the enemy without waiting on special orders. On July 23, 1862, General Hindman wrote to Captain Adams and ordered him to take command of the companies now raised, organized and armed in the counties of Randolph, Green, Lawrence and Poinsett and "move them to a rendevous [sic?] point near Jacksonport, ....and make a temporary organization of them into battalion or regiment depending on the number of men and companies.... to be used against enemy vigorously on Crowley's Ridge." On August 2, 1862, Special Order #43, Trans Mississippi District appointed William C. Adams Lieutenant Colonel and Capt. M. Baber as Major of a battalion composed of seven companies. Lieutenant Colonel Adams was authorized to assign staff officers with the approval of General McBride. He was directed to immediately dismount his command and march to McBride's camp. The intent was that the battalion to be increased to regiment as soon as possible.

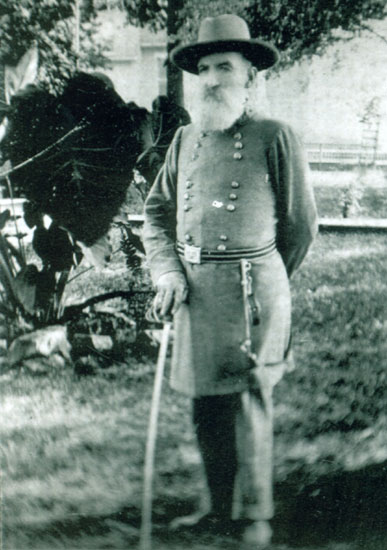
Colonel Robert G. Shaver commanded both the 7th Arkansas Infantry Regiment and the 38th Arkansas Infantry Regiment

When the regiment was finally assembled in September, 1862, it contained men from Yell, Izard, Lawrence, and Craighead counties. In early May 1862, Colonel Shaver, with General Hindman, was transferred to the Trans-Mississippi Department. The 38th was formally organized at Jacksonport, Arkansas, on September 8, 1862. Colonel Shaver was unanimously elected colonel and he continued in command during the various campaigns and battles in the department. The unit was inducted into Confederate Service on September 21, 1862, at Jacksonport, Arkansas. Its field grade officers were Colonel Robert G. Shaver, Lieutenant Colonels William C. Adams and Milton D. Baber, and Major R. R. Henry. The unit was composed of volunteer companies from the following counties:

- Company A, Commanded by Captain James L. Sexton, organized at Lauratown, Arkansas, on June 17, 1862
- Company B, Commanded by Captain Joshua Wann, organized in Lawrence County, Arkansas, on July 19, 1862
- Company C, Commanded by Captain James J. Wyatt, organized at Camp Adams, Randolph County, Arkansas, on July 19, 1862
- Company D, Commanded by Captain William J. Sanders, organized at Smithville, Arkansas, on July 19, 1862
- Company E, Commanded by Captain M. Beshoar, organized in Pocahontas, Randolph County, Arkansas, on July 8, 1862
- Company F, Commanded by Captain Alfred Gay organized in Evening Shade, Lawrence County, Arkansas, on July 16, 1862. This company appears to have been first organized as Company G, 1st Arkansas 30 Day Volunteer Regiment at Evening Shade on November 15, 1861, under the command of Captain Daniel Yeager. The company was discharged on December 15, 1861. On April 5, 1862, Danile Yeager was elected Captain of Company A, 25th Regiment, Arkansas State Militia. The other company officers were First Lieutenant John Huddleston, Second Lieutenant John A. Moody, and Third Lieutenant Joseph F. Wainsight.
- Company G, Commanded by Captain John R. Wells, organized in Powhatan, Lawrence County, Arkansas, on June 7, 1862
- Company H, Commanded by Captain William A. Black, organized in Randolph County, Arkansas, on July 15, 1862
- Company I, Commanded by Captain R. W. Echols, organized in Independence County, Arkansas, on August 6, 1862
- Company K, Commanded by Captain Louis E. Knight, organized at Sulphur Rock, Arkansas, on August 7, 1862
- Company L
- Company M, Formerly organized as Company F, 10th Missouri Infantry Regiment

In the fall of 1864 the 38th, and the 27th Arkansas Infantry Regiment were consolidated, and they were known thenceforth until the surrender in May 1865, as Shaver's Infantry Regiment.

== Service ==
=== Prairie Grove campaign ===
The 38th Arkansas was assigned to Colonel Robert G. Shaver's 2nd Brigade of Daniel M. Frost's 3rd Division of Major General Thomas C. Hindman's 1st Corps of the Army of the Trans-Mississippi for the Battle of Prairie Grove on December 7, 1862. The other regiments in the brigade were the 27th, 33rd, and Adams' Arkansas Infantry Regiments. Only a portion of the 38th Arkansas was engaged at Prairie Grove, because the unit was not fully armed. The portion of the regiment with weapons, which totaled men 152, from Companies A, C, G, H, and probably K, were placed under the command of Lieutenant Colonel William C. Adams and supported General Joseph Orville Shelby's brigade during the battle. According to Lieutenant Colonel William C. Adams' report of the engagement, the unit lost 5 killed, 25 wounded, 22 missing at Prairie Grove.

=== Summer 1863 ===
On February 28, 1863, Brigadier General J. C. Tappan, formerly commander of the 13th Arkansas Infantry Regiment, was ordered to assume command of Shaver's brigade, consisting of the 38th Arkansas Infantry Regiment, commanded by Colonel Robert G. Shaver, the 27th Arkansas Infantry Regiment commanded by Colonel James R. Shaler, and the 33rd Arkansas Infantry Regiment commanded by Colonel Hiram L. Grinstead. General Tappan was ordered to move his brigade to Louisiana to support General Taylor's operations against General's Grant's forces laying siege to Vicksburg Mississippi. Tappan's Brigade was present at the Battle of Goodrich's Landing on June 29, 1863, where they helped force the capitulation of two companies of the 1st Arkansas Infantry, African Descent. The 38th spent the month of July 1863 in the vicinity of Delhi, Louisiana, where they conducted raids on Federal interests between Delhi and the Mississippi River. The 38th and Tappan's brigade was ordered to Arkansas, via Pine Bluff, in August 1863. The Tappan's Brigade and the 38th Arkansas missed the Battle of Helena on July 4, 1863, because of its operations in Louisiana.

Tappan's Brigade with the 38th returned to Arkansas in August 1863 and was involved in the defense of Little Rock. At the evacuation of Little Rock, September 10, 1863, Colonel Shaver was in command of the brigade and covered the Confederate retreat out of the city southward. He was greatly mortified that he was not permitted to engage the enemy, and he always contended that General Price should have offered battle. The 38th retreated down the Southwest Trail to Benton and on to the vicinity of Arkadelphia, while they spent the winter of 1863.

=== Red River Campaign ===
During the spring of 1864 the 38th Arkansas was consolidated with the 27th Arkansas. Colonel Shaler of the 27th had proved to be unpopular with his men and junior officers. Shaler was a Missourian and made several attempts to have the 27th added to a brigade of Missouri Troops. Because of this consolidation, and because of the similarities between the names Shaver and Shaler, several historian's have mistakenly reported that Colonel Robert Shaver was elected as commander of both regiments.

Upon the launch of the Union Army's Red River Campaign, seizing Alexandria, Louisiana and moving on Natchitoches and Shreveport, General Kirby Smith ordered Churchill's Arkansas Division which had most of his infantry (including Tappan's and Gause's brigades) south to Shreveport, Louisiana, in early March, 1864 to assist in countering Union General Nathaniel Banks' advance along the Red River. Churchill's division reached Keatchie, Louisiana, in time to support Richard Taylor's main force who routed Banks’ army in the Battle of Mansfield (Sabine Crossroads) on April 8, 1864. The next day, the Confederate forces united to attack the Union rear guard at Pleasant Hill on the afternoon of April 9. The Confederates had endured a long forced march from south central Arkansas to Mansfield, and another of ten hours to Pleasant Hill that day with only two hours’ rest. The Union troops held a formidable position, and although the Arkansans and Missourians fought valiantly, they were repulsed and retreated six miles to the nearest water.

After the battle of Pleasant Hill, Churchill's Division made a hasty return with General Kirby Smith back to Arkansas to assist General Price in dealing with the other half of the Red River campaign, Union General Frederick Steele's Camden Expedition moving southwest from Little Rock. The Division and Tappan's Brigade arrived just in time to join the pursuit of Steele's army as it retreated from Camden, and join in the attack on Steele as he tried to cross the Saline River at Jenkins' Ferry on April 30, 1864. After an all-night march through a rainstorm and ankle-deep mud, Tappan's Brigade reinforced Gause's Brigade, and personally led by General Churchill, the Confederate force made repeated attacks on the Union federals attempting to cross the river. During the Battle of Jenkins' Ferry, the consolidated command lost 4 killed and 22 wounded.

=== Close of the War ===
Many of the men from the Shaver's Infantry transferred to the newly formed 45th Arkansas Mounted Infantry in the summer of 1864 and rode with General Sterling Price on his Missouri Campaign in the fall of 1864. On 30 September 1864, General Kirby Smith's report on the organization of the Army of the Trans-Mississippi lists the 33rd Arkansas, under the command of Lieutenant Colonel R.G. Shaver, as belonging to Brigadier General James C. Tappan's, 3rd Brigade of Acting Major General Thomas J. Churchill's 1st Arkansas Infantry Division of Major General John B. Magruder's 2nd Army Corps. On 17 November 1864, a union spy reported that the Tampan's Brigade and Churchill's Division was in the vicinity of Camden, in Ouachita County, Arkansas.

On 31 December 1864, General Kirby Smith's report on the organization of his forces lists the 38th Arkansas, under the command of Colonel R.G. Shaver as belonging to Brigadier General James C. Tappan's, 3rd Brigade of Acting Major General Thomas J. Churchill's 1st Arkansas Infantry Division of Major General John B. Magruder's 2nd Army Corps, Confederate Army of the Trans-Mississippi.

On 22 January 1865, Major General Churchill was ordered to move his division to Minden, Louisiana, and occupy winter quarters. Union commanders in the Department of the Gulf reported on March 20, 1865, that General Tappan's brigade minus Shaver's regiment, was located a Minden, Louisiana, with the rest of Churchill's Division. In early April 1865, the division concentrated near Shreveport, Louisiana, and then moved to Marshall, Texas by mid April 1865.

=== Campaign Credit ===
The 38th is credited with taking part in the following battles:

- Battle of Prairie Grove, Arkansas, December 7, 1862
- Battle of Little Rock, Arkansas, September 10, 1863
- Red River Campaign, Arkansas March–May, 1864
  - Battle of Pleasant Hill, Louisiana, April 9, 1864
  - Battle of Jenkins Ferry, Arkansas April 30, 1864

== Surrender ==
The 38th Arkansas, like most of the Arkansas infantry regiments, was located in the vicinity of Marshall, Texas, when the war ended. As the state had been so ravaged by war and thus was unable to subsist large numbers of troops, General Kirby Smith had sent most of his infantry to Texas the previous fall.None of the regiments camped around Marshall actually participated in a formal surrender. They simply disbanded and went home. Some soldiers were paroled individually at various points as they made their way home, but most were never paroled. The 38th Arkansas was included in the formal surrender of the Army of Trans-Mississippi by General Kirby Smith at Marshall, Texas, on May 26, 1865.

== See also ==
- List of Confederate units from Arkansas
- Confederate Units by State

== Sources ==
- Allen, Desmond Walls, "The Thirty-Eighth Arkansas Confederate Infantry". (Conway, AR: Arkansas Research, 1988) ISBN 0-941765-37-7
- Banasik, Michael E., "Embattled Arkansas: The Prairie Grove Campaign of 1862". (Wilmington, NC: Broadfoot Publishing Company 1998)
