= 27th Arkansas Infantry Regiment =

27th Arkansas Infantry (Confederate)
- Active: 1862–1865
- Disbanded: May 26, 1865
- Country: Confederate States
- Allegiance: Arkansas
- Branch: Army
- Type: Infantry
- Size: Regiment
- Engagements: American Civil War: Prairie Grove Campaign; Battle of Van Buren; Vicksburg Campaign; Battle of Goodrich's Landing; Little Rock Campaign; Battle of Bayou Fourche; Red River Campaign; Battle of Mansfield; Battle of Pleasant Hill; Battle of Jenkins' Ferry

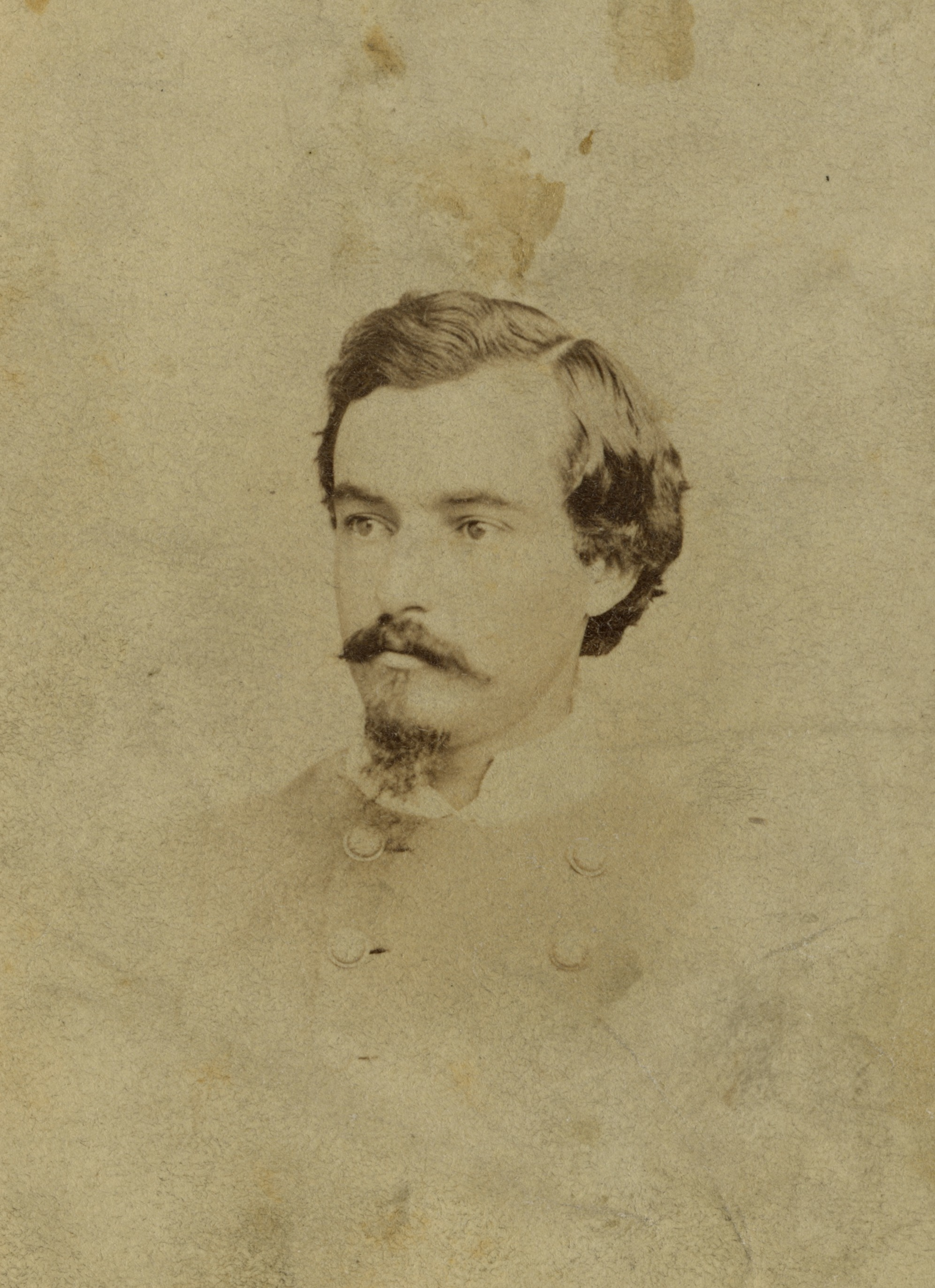
Anton Pierre Saugrain, Adjutant of the 27th Arkansas Infantry

The 27th Arkansas Infantry Regiment (1862–1865) was a Confederate Army infantry regiment during the American Civil War. The unit served entirely in the Department of the Trans-Mississippi and surrendered at Marshall, Texas, at the war's end.

== Organization ==
27th Infantry Regiment was organized at Yellville, Arkansas, in July 1862, composed of a number of companies of mounted volunteers, who were dismounted and reinforced with several companies of conscripts. James R. Shaler, a Missourian who had previously served in the Missouri State Guard, was appointed colonel. The field officers were Colonels James R. Shaler and Beal Gaither, and Lieutenant Colonels A. J. Magenis and James M. Riggs. The unit was composed of companies from the following counties:

- Company A – Commanded by Captain Frederick T. Wood, organized on May 18, 1862, at Yellville, Marion County.
- Company B – Commanded by Captain Newton A. Evans, organized February 15, 1862, at Carrollton, Arkansas, Carroll County.
- Company C – Commanded by Captain Jacob O. R. Ruble, organized February 15, 1862, at Bellefonte, Carroll County.
- Company D – Commanded by Captain Beal Gaither Jr, organized February 15, 1862, at Washington Barracks, Carroll County.
- Company E – Commanded by Captain W. B. Flippin, organized June 18, 1862, in Marion County.
- Company F – Commanded by Captain Waddy Thorpe Hunt, organized May 21, 1862, at Locust Grove, Searcy County. This unit contained many former members of the 45th Arkansas Militia Regiment.
- Company G – Commanded by Captain Robert C. Mathews, organized May 18, 1862, Mount Olive, Izard County.
- Company H – Commanded by Captain Thomas Morton, organized June 28, 1862, in Izard County.
- Company I – Commanded by Captain James M. Riggs, organized July 6, 1862, at Richwoods, Izard County.
- Company K – Commanded by Captain J. J. Coleman, organized June 28, 1862, at Yellville Marion County.

=== Connection to Brown's Arkansas Battery ===
On August 1, 1862, Major General Hindman ordered Brigadier General McBride to detail 120 men from the infantry regiments in his brigade to man a new battery under the command of Capt. L. W. Brown. It appears that each of the companies in the 27th Arkansas detailed men to help organize Brown's Arkansas Battery. Six each came from Companies "G" and "I"; another five were assigned from Company "F". Others appear to be from Companies "A", "B", "C", "E", "H" and "K". Several Missouri men from Company B, Matlock's 32nd Arkansas Infantry Regiment, joined the battery. The transfer of men from the 26th Arkansas to Brown's Battery was made permanent "by order of Gen. Hindman" as of August 12, 1862. The battery served with a Missouri cavalry brigade at first under Colonel John Q. Burbridge and later under Colonel Joseph C. Porter. The battery was apparently disbanded in April 1863. General Holmes issued Special Order No. 23, District of Arkansas, dated April 11, 1863, which appears to have ordered the transfer of 17 members of Brown's Battery who had originally been transferred from Shaler's 27th Arkansas Infantry Regiment to return to their unit. These men are counted as present on the regiment's muster rolls in for April/May 1863. Six other unit members had been discharged from the service on March 23, 1863.

== Service ==
The new regiment was initially designated as the 1st Regiment, McBride's Brigade. Col Shaler soon proved to be unpopular with the men. Like all true Missouri Confederates, Shaler was obsessed with liberating his State from the Yankees. However, the regiment was organized for the defense of northern Ark, and Shaler's efforts to turn the regiment into a Missouri outfit resulted in dissension in the ranks.

=== Prairie Grove Campaign ===
The 27th Arkansas was initially assigned to Colonel Robert G. Shaver's 2nd Brigade of Daniel M. Frost's 3rd Division of Major General Thomas C. Hindman's 1st Corps of the Army of the Trans-Mississippi The other regiments in the brigade were the 27th, 38th, and Adams' Arkansas Infantry Regiments. ON November 11, 1862, Col Shaler reported that his command was in no condition whatever to move against the enemy because his arms were composed of shot guns rifles and about 20 muskets. He stated that he had 312 effective men and 150 effective guns. The 27th did not accompany the brigade to Prairie Grove and was not engaged in the fighting because the regiment was without adequate arms. The regiment remained in the Fort Smith area serving as the Provost Martial until the Confederates retreated to Van Buren following the Battle. The regiment underwent a consolidation and reorganization following the Battle of Prairie Grove and was consolidated with the remnants of Adam's Arkansas Infantry Regiment. The regiment was reorganized as follows:

- Company A – Commanded by Captain Frederick T. Wood. This company received several of the former members of Captain Capt. H. L. Smith's Company C of Adams's Arkansas Infantry Regiment, which was disbanded following the Battle of Prairie Grove,
- Company B (new) – Commanded by Captain T. A. Hartman. This company was organized on October 9, 1862 by the consolidation of Bryant's and Pollock's Companies. This company received many of the former members of Company F, Adams's Arkansas Infantry Regiment,
- Company C (new) – Commanded by Captain Francis Marion Gibson, organized at Lunenburg, Izard County. This Company received several of the former members of Captain Berry's Company G, Adams's Arkansas Infantry Regiment.
- Company D – Commanded by Captain Beal Gaither Jr,. This company received several of the former members of Company B, Adams's Arkansas Infantry Regiment.
- Company E – Commanded by Captain B.F. Hollowell. The old Company B was consolidated with this company in July 1862 (before Prairie Grove Campaign), and the company received several of the former members of Captain J. W. Bishop's Company E of Adams's Arkansas Infantry Regiment.
- Company F – Commanded by Captain Waddy Thorpe Hunt, This company received several former members of Company A, Adams's Arkansas Infantry Regiment.
- Company G – Commanded by Captain Robert C. Mathews. This company received several of the former members of Captain Samuel Phillips Company of Adams's Arkansas Infantry Regiment.
- Company H – Commanded by Captain Thomas Morton, This company received several of the former members of Capt. Hiram H. Combs ' Company of Adams's Arkansas Infantry Regiment.
- Company I – Commanded by Captain James M. Riggs, This company received several of the former members of Captain John Parks Company of Adams's Arkansas Infantry Regiment.
- Company K – Commanded by Captain Van B. Tate. This company received several of the former members of Adams's Arkansas Infantry Regiment, but the company they came from was not identified.

=== Summer 1863 ===
On February 28, 1862, Brigadier General J. C. Tappan, former commander of the 13th Arkansas Infantry Regiment, was ordered to assume command of Shaver's brigade, composed of the 38th Arkansas Infantry Regiment, commanded by Colonel Robert G. Shaver, the 27th Arkansas Infantry Regiment commanded by Colonel James R. Shaler, and the 33rd Arkansas Infantry Regiment commanded by Colonel Hiram L. Grinstead. They remained with Tappan's Brigade through the remainder of the war.

Col Shaler's unpopularity with his men continued. The men in the unit believe that Col Shaler repeatedly

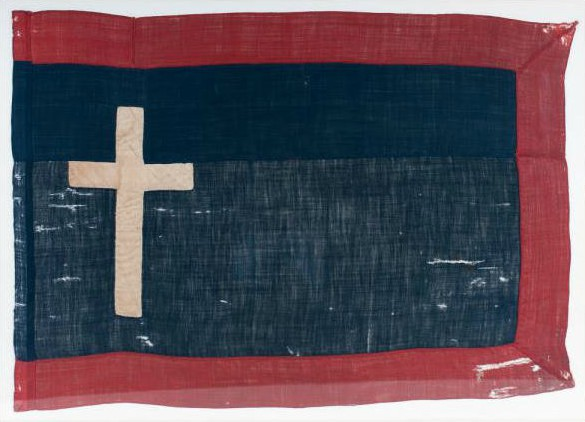
Original flag of the 1st Missouri Dismounted Cavalry (CSA)

tried to get the regiment transferred to a Missouri Brigade. This perception was reinforced when Shaler adopted a Missouri pattern battle flag for the regiment. In April 1863, one soldier wrote to his wife that Col Shaler had replaced the regiment's confederate battle-flag with a Missouri flag. He described the flag's "roman catholic" styling and stated that he and his comrades were outraged, and thought that most of the regiment would refuse to fight under the Missouri banner.

General Tappan was ordered to move his brigade to Louisiana to support General Richard Taylor's operations against General Grant's forces laying siege to Vicksburg Mississippi. The 27th spent the month of July 1863 in the vicinity of Delhi, Louisiana, where they conducted raids on Federal interests between Delhi and the Mississippi River. Tappan's Brigade was present at the Battle of Goodrich's Landing on June 29, 1863, where they helped force the capitulation of two companies of the 1st Arkansas Infantry, African Descent. Tappan's brigade was ordered to return to Arkansas, via Pine Bluff, in August 1863. The Tappan's Brigade and the 27th Arkansas missed the Battle of Helena on July 4, 1863, because of its operations in Louisiana.

The 27th returned to Arkansas in August 1863, and was involved in the defense of Little Rock. In the first weeks of September, 1863, the 27th served in the Little Rock defenses near present-day North Little Rock. After General Price abandoned Little Rock on September 10, 1863, the 27th retreated down the Southwest Trail to Benton and on to the vicinity of Arkadelphia, while they spent the winter of 1863.

All of the regiments that had been organized by Major General Hindman had been led by field grade officers appointed by Major General Hindman, rather than elected by the men. This led to dissatisfaction in several units, including the 27th. Colonel Shaler continued to be unpopular with his men and junior officers and was not re-elected on November 27, 1863. Beal Gaither was elected Colonel in place of Shaler. The regiment was much reduced in size due to desertions, disease and battle loss and was often consolidated with Colonel Robert G. Shaver's 38th Arkansas Infantry Regiment. Because of this consolidation, and because of the similarities between the names Shaver and Shaler, several historian's have mistakenly reported that Colonel Robert Shaver was elected as commander of both regiments.

=== Red River Campaign ===
Upon the launch of the Union Army's Red River Campaign, seizing Alexandria, Louisiana and moving on Natchitoches and Shreveport, General Kirby Smith ordered Churchill's Arkansas Division, which had most of his infantry (including Tappan's and Gause's brigades), south to Shreveport, Louisiana, in early March, 1864 to assist in countering Union General Nathaniel Banks' advance along the Red River. Churchill's division reached Keatchie, Louisiana, in time to support Richard Taylor's main force, that routed Banks' army in the Battle of Mansfield (Sabine Crossroads) on April 8, 1864. The division arrived during the engagement, but was not committed to battle and occupied a position on the flank of General Taylor's division. Brigadier General Churchill was placed in command of both his own division and Brigadier General Parson's Division during the pursuit of the enemy from Mansfield to Pleasant Hill, Louisiana, so Brigadier General Tappan assumed command of Churchill's Division. While Tappan commanded the Division, Colonel Grinstead assumed command of Tappan's Brigade and led it through the fight at Pleasant Hill, on April 9, 1864. General Tappan described the action at Pleasant Hill as follows:

My line was formed at about 4:30 o'clock ... I threw out three companies of skirmishers under Major Steele of Grinsted's regiment, and immediately ordered my line to advance rapidly as directed ... For an hour and a half we were as warmly engaged with the enemy as it has ever been my experience to witness on any battlefield. My division, however, never faltered, but moved steadily forward, with the valor of men determined to succeed or fall in the attempt ... At this juncture, learning that the division on the right had been outflanked and was falling back, I immediately directed my attention in that direction and saw that such was the case. When said division had swept entirely past mine, and my command became exposed to a heavy and murderous fire from the flank as well as from the front, I ordered the brigade commanders to fall back with a view of forming a line in a more advantageous position ... The exhausted condition of the men, the lateness of the hour (it being near dark), and the denseness of the thicket made it extremely difficult to rally the men. While the battle lasted no men ever fought more gallantly. This is evidenced by the fact that the enemy made little or no attempt to pursue our line; on the contrary, he fled toward Red river as soon as night came, leaving his dead to be buried and his wounded to be cared by us. The loss of the division in the engagement was as follows: Killed, 26; wounded, 112; missing, 63.

Churchill's Division marched back north into Arkansas to deal with the other part of the Federal advance, General Frederick Steele's Camden Expedition. The division arrived after a long forced march at Woodlawn, Arkansas, on April 26, where they rested overnight, then joined the pursuit of Steele's retreating army. The Division and Tappan's Brigade arrived just in time to join the pursuit of Steele's army as it retreated from Camden, and join in the attack on Steele as he tried to cross the Saline River at Jenkins' Ferry on April 30, 1864. After an all-night march through a rainstorm and ankle-deep mud, Tappan's Brigade reinforced Gause's Brigade, and personally led by General Churchill, the Confederate force made repeated attacks on the Union federals attempting to cross the river. During the Battle of Jenkins Ferry, the consolidated 27th/38th Arkansas reported 4 killed and 22 wounded. Tappan's Brigade and the 27th Arkansas returned to the vicinity of Camden following Jenkins' Ferry, and saw no substantial combat for the remainder of the war.

=== Close of war ===
On 30 September 1864, General Kirby Smith's report on the organization of the Army of the Trans-Mississippi lists the 27th Arkansas, under the command of Lieutenant Colonel James M. Riggs, as belonging to Brigadier General James C. Tappan's, 3rd Brigade of Acting Major General Thomas J. Churchill's 1st Arkansas Infantry Division of Major General John B. Magruder's 2nd Army Corps. On 17 November 1864, a union spy reported that Tappan's Brigade and Churchill's Division was in the vicinity of Camden, in Ouachita County, Arkansas. Cpl. Absalom Langston of Company, writing home to his wife from Camden Arkansas on December the 18 1864 reported:

Dear companion, it is with the greatest pleasure that I, this Sabbath morning, embrace the opportunity of writing you a few lines to let you know that I am well (and) hoping these few lines will come to hand, finds you enjoying the blessings of god's mercy. I have nothing of importance to write, more than I am doing very well, I have plenty to live on.

We are at Camden on post (?) guard. Our regiment has been here six months, and I don't know when we will leave here.

We are in winter quarters here. Huldy, I reckon that you think I have forgotten you, but I haven't. I haven't had the chance to write to you. I don't know whether you will get this or not, but I hope you will, and I know it will give you great satisfaction to hear from me and know that I was still living, and in good health. Mary Muhuldy, I want to see you very bad, but it is out of my power to come to see you unless the way gets open between here and there. And if it does, I think General Magruder would furlough all the north Arkansas troops.

I can't go home without deserting, and I declare Mary, that you are too high-minded a woman to want me to disgrace myself, and you, and my old father and mother. I know you want me to come honorably as the veteran of a good army, and has proved to the world that he is a man who loved his country, and who was willing to offer himself a sacrifice for its rights.

On 31 December 1864, General Kirby Smith's report on the organization of his forces lists the 27th Arkansas, under the command of Lieutenant Colonel James M. Riggs as belonging to Brigadier General James C. Tappan's, 3rd Brigade of Acting Major General Thomas J. Churchill's 1st Arkansas Infantry Division of Major General John B. Magruder's 2nd Army Corps, Confederate Army of the Trans-Mississippi. In late January, 1865, Churchill's Division moved to Minden, Louisiana, where they established winter quarters. In early April 1865, the division concentrated near Shreveport Louisiana, and then moved to Marshall, Texas, by mid April 1865.

=== Campaign Credit ===
The regiment participated in the following battles:

- Prairie Grove Campaign, Arkansas, December, 1862
  - Battle of Van Buren, Arkansas, December 28, 1862.
- Vicksburg Campaign, (Louisiana Operations), June - July, 1863.
  - Battle of Goodrich's Landing, Louisiana, June 29–30, 1863.
- Battle of Bayou Fourche, Arkansas, September 10, 1863.
- Red River Campaign, Arkansas March–May, 1864.
  - Battle of Mansfield, Louisiana, April 8, 1864. (In tactical reserve.)
  - Battle of Pleasant Hill, Louisiana, April 9, 1864.
  - Battle of Jenkins Ferry, Arkansas, April 30, 1864.

== Surrender ==
This regiment surrendered with the Department of the Trans-Mississippi, General E. Kirby Smith commanding, May 26, 1865. With few exceptions, the Arkansas Infantry regiments in the Trans-Mississippi simply disbanded without formally surrendering. When the Trans-Mississippi Department surrendered, all of the Arkansas infantry regiments were encamped in and around Marshall, Texas (war-ravaged Arkansas no longer able to subsist the army). The regiments were ordered to report to Shreveport, Louisiana, to be paroled, but none of them did so. Some individual soldiers went to Shreveport on their own to be paroled, others reported to Union garrisons at Fort Smith, Pine Bluff or Little Rock to receive their paroles, but for the most part, the men simply went home.

== See also ==
- List of Confederate units from Arkansas
- Confederate Units by State

== Bibliography ==
- Allen, Desmond Walls. History of the 27th Arkansas Confederate Infantry. (Conway, AR: Arkansas Research, 1988). ISBN 0-941765-10-5.
- Turnbo, Silas C. History of the Twenty-seventh Arkansas Confederate Infantry. (Conway, AR: Arkansas Research, 1988). ISBN 0-941765-86-5, 159 pages.
