= William Flippin =

American politician

William B. Flippin (September 4, 1817-?) was a public official and politician in Arkansas. A Democrat, he served in the Arkansas House of Representatives (1854 and 1874-1875) and in the Arkansas Senate as enrolling and engrossing clerk in 1877.

He was one of two sons of Thomas Haggard Flippin for whom Flippin, Arkansas in Marion County is named. He served as the captain of a company in the Confederate Army (27th Arkansas Infantry Regiment Company E) and then as quartermaster. He served as a justice of the peace and county surveyor.

He married Agnes W. Adams. They had three sons and four daughters: Thomas H. Flippin who served as private secretary for Arkansas Governor William Meade Fishback; James A. Flippin; John P. Flippin who died in Texas; Elizabeth, the wife of James Lynch of Marion County, Arkansas; Ella J.; Letitia, the wife of Henry W. Lynch; and Matilda A., the deceased wife of W. C. McBee.

He was a member of the masons.
