= Minutemen (Missouri Secessionist Paramilitaries) =

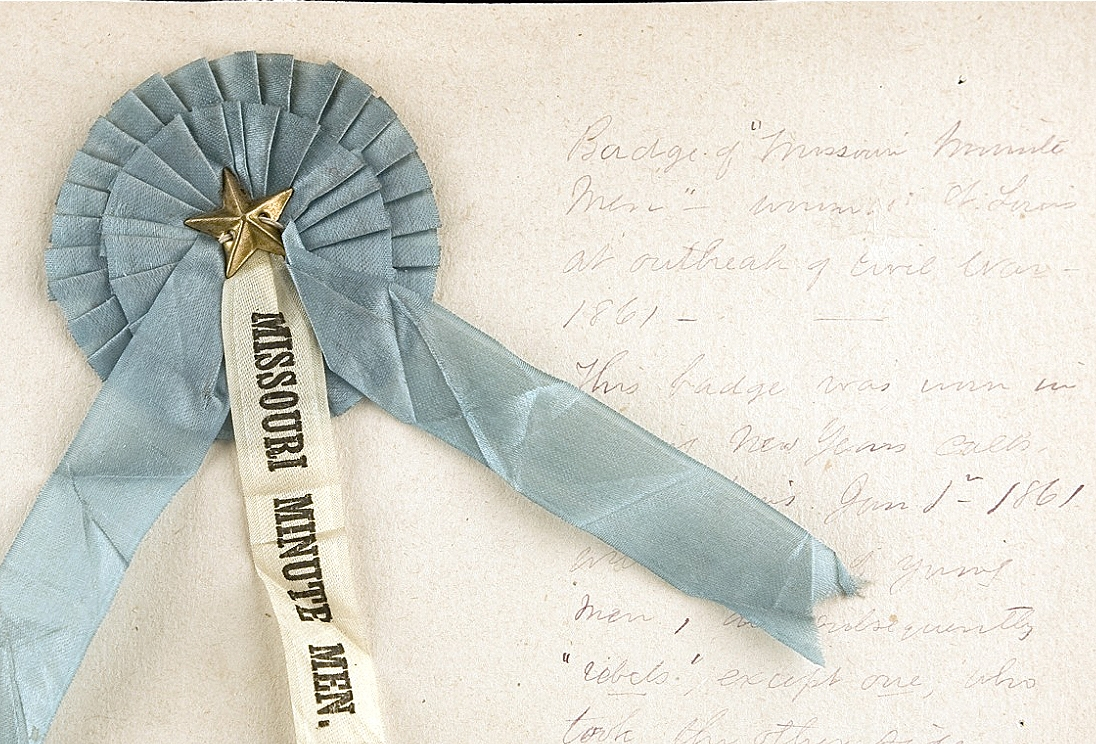
Missouri Minute Men secession cockade, Missouri State Museum

The Minutemen was a secessionist paramilitary organization in St. Louis, Missouri in the early months of 1861. Many members joined the 2nd Regiment of the Missouri Volunteer Militia, and after May 10, 1861 the Missouri State Guard or the Confederate States Army.

== Background and formation ==
The Minutemen organization in St. Louis was founded in January, 1861 by pro-southern St. Louisans who opposed Federal "coercion" of seceding southern states, or who actively supported Missouri's secession from the Union. Members signed a pledge which stated that they opposed coercion, supported armed aid to southern states in case of coercion, and called for secession in case of sectional conflict. Many members had previously been members of Democratic Party marching clubs or Breckenridge activists during the 1860 Presidential Election

The organization was established simultaneously with similar Unionist organizations, which also grew out of Republican Party organizations (such as the Wide Awakes), or the ethnic German Turnverein movement. Members were predominantly younger men, who culturally identified with the South. Organizers included South Carolina born Colton Green, Kentuckian Basil Wilson Duke, and Irish immigrant J. Rock Champion.

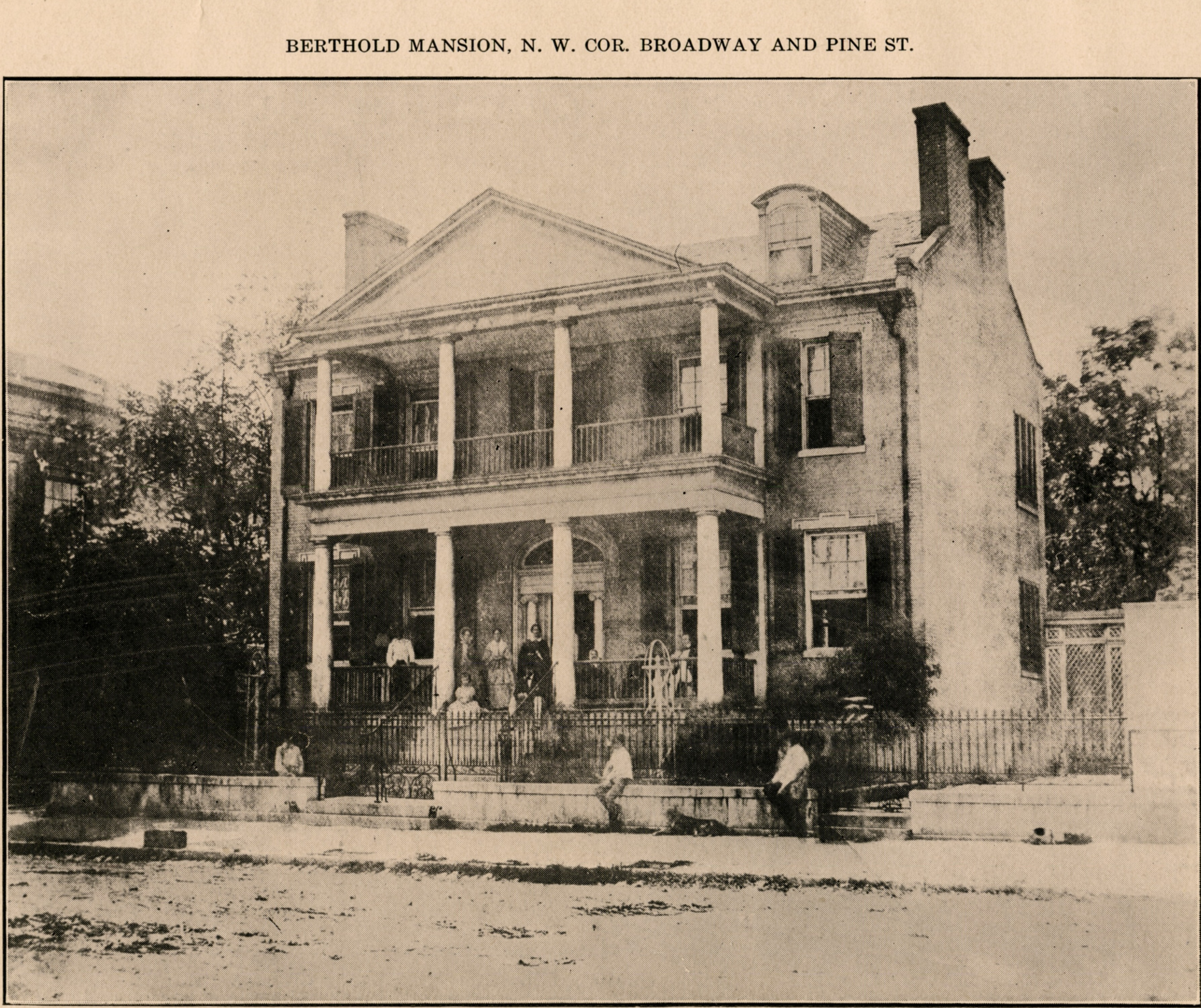
Berthold Mansion in St. Louis

The Minutemen had their headquarters in the Berthold Mansion in downtown St. Louis, at the corner of 5th and Pine Streets. Members confronted St. Louis Unionists and maintained surveillance on the Federal Arsenal at the St. Louis riverfront. Members of the organization were wearing the distinctive blue cockade and after collecting weapons organized themselves into provisional companies and engaged in military drill (as did pro-Union activists). Although unofficial military organizations were prohibited by the newly enacted Militia Law, state authorities did not interfere with the activities of the Minutemen. Instead, on February 13, 1861, Brigadier General Daniel M. Frost, Missouri Volunteer Militia (MVM) commander of the 1st (St. Louis) Military District of Missouri, enrolled the Minutemen as companies in a new (pro-secessionist) 2nd Regiment MVM.

Through March and April the members of the Minutemen continued to recruit members, prepare for war, and confront their Unionist opponents in St. Louis. One incident nearly led to bloodshed. In the early morning of March 4, 1861, members of the organization raised "secessionist" flags over the St. Louis Courthouse and their Berthold Mansion headquarters. Although the flag at the courthouse was quickly removed, the flag at Berthold Mansion continued to fly. Pro-Union activists, feeling provoked by the "secessionist" symbol demanded its removal and attempted to enter the building to take it down. The confrontation lead to scuffles and could have escalated to armed violence except for the intervention of the Mayor and several prominent St. Louis Unionists. The "secessionist" flag would continue to fly through May.

== Camp Jackson Incident ==
In April 1861 Governor Claiborne Fox Jackson announced a statewide militia muster for early May. On May 3 members of the Minutemen mustered at "Camp Jackson" (at Lindell's Grove on the outskirts of St. Louis) as the 2nd Regiment, Missouri Volunteer Militia under the command of Lt. Col John S. Bowen. Many St. Louisans, including members of the Minutmen organization, believed that the muster had been called to facilitate an attack on the St. Louis Arsenal.

On May 8, 1861 a shipment of artillery, small arms, and ammunition arrived from the Confederate Government (from the former U.S. Arsenal at Baton Rouge) and was transferred by the Missouri Militiamen to Camp Jackson. The acting Commander of the Federal Army's Western Department, Captain Nathaniel Lyon, verified the presence of the captured Federal ordnance at the militia camp. This, along with the enlistment of Minutemen and other acts, caused Lyon to decide that he had sufficient evidence of seditious intent by General Frost and his command. On May 10, Lyon marched a mixed force of U.S. Regulars and enrolled Missouri Volunteers to Camp Jackson and arrested the Militia without a shot being fired. However, as Lyon attempted to march the militiamen back to the Arsenal his force was confronted by angry citizens. In the rioting which ensued, 28 people were killed and more than 100 were injured, mostly civilians.

== Aftermath ==
In the immediate aftermath the Minutemen headquarters in the Berthold Mansion was searched and shuttered by Federal forces. The Minutemen who had been captured at Camp Jackson (about 50% of the militiamen had escaped the Federal forces) were briefly detained at the St. Louis Arsenal. All members gave their oath not to take up arms against the Federal Government until paroled, and were released on May 11, 1861.

After being released some Minutemen abandoned the militant cause. Others, considering their arrest illegal and their parole oath not binding, immediately joined the secessionist Missouri State Guard or went south to join the Confederate States Army. A third group remained in St. Louis as captured soldiers on parole, until exchanged for Federal troops captured at the Battle of Lexington (Missouri). These troops were then transported down the Mississippi by steamer where they enlisted in the southern forces.

Many of the Minutemen went on to significant success in the Confederate Army. Basil W. Duke succeeded to the command of John Hunt Morgan's cavalry after Morgan's death and was promoted to Brigadier General. Colton Greene was promoted to Colonel in the Confederate Army and commanded a brigade in the Trans-Mississippi Theater.
