= 1st Independent Battery Kansas Light Artillery =

- National colors of the 1st Independent Battery Kansas Light Artillery
- Active: July 24, 1861 – July 17, 1865
- Country: United States
- Allegiance: Union
- Branch: Artillery
- Equipment: 6 10-pdr Parrott rifles
- Engagements: First Battle of Newtonia; Battle of Old Fort Wayne; Battle of Prairie Grove; Battle of Nashville; Knoxville Campaign; Battle of Dry Wood Creek; Battle of Cane Hill; Van Buren raid

1st Independent Battery Kansas Light Artillery was an artillery battery that served in the Union Army during the American Civil War.

== Service ==
The battery was organized at Mound City, Kansas and mustered in for a three years on July 24, 1861, under the command of Captain Thomas Moonlight.

This unit was formed from artillery companies that were raised for the 3rd Kansas Infantry and 4th Kansas Infantry. Because both regiments did not complete organization, recruits to the artillery were reassigned and consolidated by authority of Special Orders No. 42, District of Kansas, dated April 24, 1862. The 1st Kansas Battery's organization was effected about June l, 1862. A previous attempt had been made to transfer Captain Bickerton's Artillery Company of the 3rd Kansas Infantry to the 1st Kansas Infantry as an artillery organization, and to break up Captain Thomas Moonlight's Artillery Company of the 4th Kansas Infantry and distribute it among the companies of the same regiment as infantry. However, the recruits were unhappy with this idea and on advice from Brig. Gen. Samuel D. Sturgis the order was modified and the consolidation was made in accordance with Special Orders No. 42.

The battery was attached to Department of Kansas to August 1862. 2nd Brigade, Department of Kansas, to October 1862. 1st Brigade, 1st Division, Army of the Frontier, Department of the Missouri, to February 1863. District of Rolla, Department of the Missouri, to June 1863. District of Columbus, Kentucky, 6th Division, XVI Corps, Department of the Tennessee, to November 1863. Defenses of the Nashville & Northwestern Railroad, District of Nashville, Department of the Cumberland, and 2nd Brigade, 4th Division, XX Corps, Department of the Cumberland, to November 1864. 2nd Colored Brigade, District of the Etowah, Department of the Cumberland, to January 1865. Reserve Artillery, District of Nashville, Department of the Cumberland, to July 1865.

The 1st Kansas Battery mustered out of service on July 17, 1865.

== Detailed service ==
Attached to Lane's Kansas Brigade and operations about Fort Scott and on line of the Marmiton August and September 1861. Actions at Ball's Mills August 28. Morse's Mill August 29. Dogwood Creek near Fort Scott September 2. Morristown September 17. Osceola September 21–22. Duty at Fort Scott until May 1862. Expedition into Indian Territory May 25-August 15. Action at Grand River June 6. Locust Grove July 3. Bayou Bernard July 27. Blunt's Campaign in Missouri and Arkansas September 17-December 3. Expedition to Sarcoxie September 28–30. Action at Newtonia September 29–30. Occupation of Newtonia October 4. Old Fort Wayne or Beattie's Prairie near Maysville October 22. Cane Hill November 28. Battle of Prairie Grove, Arkansas, December 7. Expedition over Boston Mountains to Van Buren December 27–31. Moved to Springfield, Missouri, January 1863, and duty there until February 17. Moved to Forsyth, Missouri, then to Fort Scott, Kansas. Duty in Missouri and Kansas, District of Rolla, until July 1863. Ordered to St. Louis, Missouri, July 5, then to Cairo, Illinois, July 18. Duty in District of Columbus, Kentucky, until November. Ordered to Nashville, Tennessee, and assigned to duty on line of the Nashville & Northwestern Railroad until November 1864. Moved to Nashville, Tennessee. Battle of Nashville December 15–16. Post duty at Nashville until January 1865, and at Chattanooga, Tennessee, until July.

== Commanders ==
- Captain Thomas Moonlight
- Captain Marcus D. Tenney

== See also ==
- List of Kansas Civil War Units
- Kansas in the Civil War
