= Robert G. Shaver =

American lawyer and military officer (1831–1915)

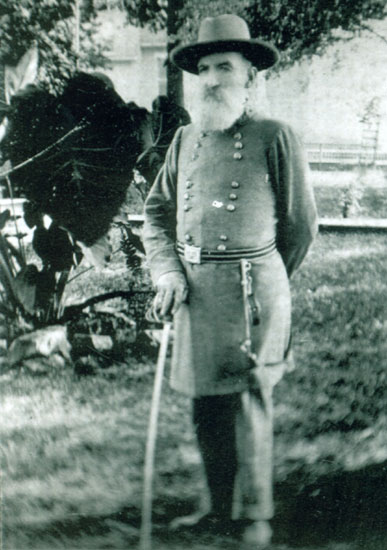
- Shaver in U.C.V. uniform, 1911
- Born: Robert Glenn Shaver; April 18, 1831; Arcadia, Sullivan County, Tennessee, U.S.
- Died: January 13, 1915 (aged 83); Foreman, Arkansas, U.S.
- Burial place: Center Point Cemetery; Center Point, Arkansas, U.S.
- Alma mater: Emory & Henry University
- Spouse: Adelaide Louise Ringgold (m. 1856; died 1889)
- Children: 8, including James
- Relatives: Dorothy Shaver (granddaughter); John Berryman (great-grandson)
- Military career
- Allegiance: Confederate States
- Branch: Confederate States Army
- Service years: 1861–1865
- Rank: Colonel
- Nickname: "Fighting Bob"
- Commands: 7th Arkansas Infantry Regiment; 27th/38th Arkansas Infantry Regiment; Shaver's Brigade
- Conflicts: American Civil War; Battle of Shiloh (WIA); Battle of Prairie Grove; Red River campaign; Battle of Mansfield; Battle of Pleasant Hill; Battle of Poison Spring; Battle of Marks' Mills; Battle of Jenkins' Ferry
- Other work: Lawyer; sheriff; farmer

Robert Glenn Shaver (April 18, 1831 – January 13, 1915) was an American lawyer, militia leader, and colonel in the Confederate States Army during the American Civil War, serving in several key battles in the Western Theater of the American Civil War. After the war, he was supreme commander of the Arkansas division of the Ku Klux Klan. Following charges of murder and treason in 1868, he fled to the British Honduras. After four years, he returned to Arkansas and served as the sheriff of the newly created Howard County. After a single term as sheriff, he continued to work as a lawyer and was appointed as major general and commander of the Arkansas State Guard.

== Early life ==
Robert Glenn Shaver was born on April 18, 1831, at Arcadia Post Office of Arcadia in Sullivan County, Tennessee, as the third of four children to Martha (née May) and David Shaver. He was named after Presbyterian minister Robert Glenn. He was raised on a farm near the Tennessee and Virginia line. He was educated at Emory & Henry University from 1846 to 1850. In 1850, he moved with his parents to a stock farm east of Batesville. In 1855 or 1859, he moved to Lawrence County and lived at a farm on Reed's Creek in the Strawberry River Valley. He studied law and became licensed to practice law there.

== Career ==
=== Civil War ===
Shaver practiced law until the outbreak of the Civil War. On May 19, 1861, from an order of the military board of Arkansas, he began to raise a regiment of ten companies along the White River Valley in Smithville. The regiment was organized on June 16, 1861. He was elected as colonel of the 7th Arkansas Infantry Regiment, which came to be known as "Shaver's Regiment". The regiment then established camp near Pocahontas, Arkansas. The regiment, then a part of the state troops, was transferred to the Confederate Army on July 23, 1861, and he was given command of the third brigade of Dardee's division. They then went to Pillman's Ferry (or Putman's Ferry) and Point Pleasant. The regiment saw battle in Columbus and Bowling Green, Kentucky. They then went to Nashville and Murfreesboro, Tennessee, and then Decatur, Alabama. Shaver commanded the rear guard of General Albert Sidney Johnston's Army of the Mississippi to Nashville as a senior colonel. His regiment was then transferred to the first brigade of Hindman's Division of the Third Army Corps. In April 1862, at the Battle of Shiloh, his brigade commander of his regiment was killed and Shaver commanded his brigade through the battle. According to Virgil Young Cook, he had three horses shot from under him at Shiloh and six horses in total throughout the war. His hand was severely wounded at Shiloh. He then went to Corinth and Tupelo. In June 1862, he was transferred to the Trans-Mississippi Department. His regiment was reduced significantly from the battle and he was sent home to raise another regiment. He was then assigned to Hineman's first brigade and established a camp in Pine Bluff and at Camp Sulphur. He remained in that command until September 1862.

On September 8, 1862, the 38th Arkansas Infantry Regiment was organized and Shaver was elected as colonel. He was located at Pocahontas and then Van Buren. He was then in Yellville and fought at the Battle of Prairie Grove. He then went to Little Rock in January 1863. Following the fall of Vicksburg, he camped at Arkadelphia and then was on special duty in the White River Valley. He helped in the defense of Little Rock, but then retreated south on September 10, 1863. He remained fighting in south Arkansas and Louisiana for the remainder of the war and surrendered in Louisiana as one of the last remaining organized Confederate forces.

In the fall of 1864, after the re-organization of the Army of the Trans-Mississippi, Shaver was elected as colonel of the 38th Arkansas Infantry Regiment again and as colonel of the 27th Arkansas Infantry Regiment. The regiments were consolidated by General Edmund Kirby Smith and they were then known as Shaver's Infantry Regiment. The regiment was involved in the Red River campaign and the Battle of Jenkins' Ferry. He was assigned a post in Camden and remained there until order to Texas in March 1865. The regiment surrendered to Union General Francis J. Herron on June 19, 1865, in Shreveport, Louisiana. He also participated in the battles of Mansfield, Poison Spring, and Marks' Mills. He was wounded four times in the war. His nickname was "Fighting Bob". In an article after his death, Virgil Young Cook argued that someone in the Confederate senate had prevented the promotion of Shaver. Following the war, he returned to his farm in Jacksonport of Jackson County. He remained there until 1868.

=== Ku Klux Klan ===
Shaver was supreme commander of Arkansas of the Ku Klux Klan, attaining the rank of general. He was a member of the Grand Council of the group. He was charged with murder, arson, treason, and robbery. He participated against two skirmishes against the Arkansas militia of Powell Clayton. In 1911, in an interview, Shaver claimed that he had 15,000 armed men in his command and that he once mobilized an army of 2,000 to 10,000 men near Little Rock with the purpose of capturing 'the legislature, the supreme court and the entire carpetbag government'. Federal authorities pursued him due to his Ku Klux Klan activities. In 1868, he fled to New Orleans and boarded the British ship Mexico and sailed to British Honduras. He lived in south British Honduras for four years.

=== Later career ===
In 1872 or 1874, Shaver returned to Arkansas after the election of his friend Elisha Baxter as governor. The charges were dropped. He was appointed as sheriff of the newly created Howard County by Governor Baxter. After one term as sheriff, he retired and began practicing law. He then lived in Center Point and practiced law there. From around 1884 to 1889, he practiced law with his son James D. Shaver in Center Point under the firm Shaver & Shaver. In March 1897, he was made commander of the State Guard and the Reserve Militia of Arkansas with the rank of major general. The position had been vacant since the death of Robert C. Newton.

In 1898 or 1899, Shaver moved with his family to Mena. He practiced law there and later retired due to old age. He was elected as commander of the Arkansas Division of the United Confederate Veterans in 1896, serving from 1897 to 1898. In 1911, he was commander of Camp Shaver, the veterans' camp at the Confederate reunion at Little Rock. In 1912, he wrote an article in The Star stating that he saw William Quantrell in Arkansas in 1868, three years after Quantrell's reported death in Kentucky. In 1912, the sword he lost at the Battle of Shiloh was returned to him.

== Personal life ==
Shaver married Adelaide Louise Ringgold, daughter of John Ringgold, of Batesville on June 10, 1856. Her father was an early settler of Batesville and a member of the 1836 Constitutional Convention. His wife died in 1889. They had eight children, James David, Robert G. Jr., Adelaide Ringgold, Lucretia Shelby, Martha May, Maude, Charles Edgar, and Percy Noland. His son James was a member of the Arkansas legislature. His granddaughter was fashion businesswoman Dorothy Shaver. His great-grandson was poet John Berryman.

Shaver died on January 13, 1915, at the home of his daughter in Foreman. He was buried in Center Point.

== Legacy ==
A poem on the Arkansas Confederate soldier references Shaver in the following stance: "We fought with Lee at Gettysburg, with Cleburne always our saver. With Brag at Chickamauga Creek, at Shiloh with Bob Shaver". Camp Shaver, a veterans' camp, in Little Rock was named after him.
