= 13th Arkansas Infantry Regiment =

13th Arkansas Infantry (Confederate)
- Active: 1861–1865
- Disbanded: April 26, 1865
- Country: Confederate States
- Allegiance: Arkansas
- Branch: Army
- Type: Infantry
- Size: Regiment
- Facings: Light blue
- Engagements: American Civil War: Battle of Belmont; Battle of Shiloh; Siege of Corinth; Kentucky Campaign; Battle of Richmond; Battle of Perryville; Battle of Murfreesboro; Tullahoma Campaign; Battle of Liberty Gap; Chickamauga Campaign; Battle of Chickamauga; Chattanooga campaign; Battle of Missionary Ridge; Battle of Ringgold Gap; Atlanta campaign; Battle of Rocky Face Ridge; Battle of Resaca; Battle of New Hope Church; Battle of Pickett's Mill; Battle of Kennesaw Mountain; Battle of Peachtree Creek; Siege of Atlanta; Battle of Jonesboro; Franklin–Nashville Campaign; Battle of Franklin; Battle of Nashville; Carolinas campaign; Battle of Bentonville

The 13th Arkansas Infantry (1861–1865) was a Confederate Army infantry regiment during the American Civil War. Organized mainly from companies, including several prewar volunteer militia companies, raised in northeastern Arkansas, the regiment was among the first transferred to Confederate Service, and spent virtually the entire war serving in Confederate forces east of the Mississippi River. After the unit sustained heavy casualties during the Battle of Murfreesboro, the unit spent most of the rest of the war field consolidated with the 13th Arkansas Infantry Regiment, to form the 5th/13th Arkansas Infantry Regiment.

== Organization ==
The 13th Arkansas was formally organized on July 29, 1861, at Camp Ground in Greene County, Arkansas, with about 1,000 men. The companies (less Co. K) mustered into Confederate service at Harrisburg, Arkansas, on July 23, 1861. Company K, the "Erin Guards," was from St. Louis, Missouri; the rest of the companies were from northeast Arkansas. Colonel A. D. Grayson was the mustering officer. The regiment was organized from the following companies:

- Company A – the "Tappan Guards" commanded by Captain Robert B. Lambert, was originally organized as a volunteer militia company under the 12th Militia Regiment of Phillips County on May 23, 1861, under the command of Captain James C. Tappan. For an unknown reason, the company officers were issued new militia commissions as belonging to the 14th Regiment, Arkansas State Militia on August 1, 1861.
- Company B – the "Richland Rangers", originally organized as a volunteer militia company in the 19th Militia Regiment of St. Francis County, Arkansas, enlisted August 1, 1861, at Madison, Arkansas, under the command of Captain John C. Johnson, Captain J. R. Shelton succeeded Johnson in command.
- Company C – the "Harrisburg Vindicators", commanded by Captain Benjamin Harris from Poinsett County, Arkansas, by the time of the Battle of Shiloh, 1st Lieutenant J. H. Hall had assumed command. The company was originally organized as a volunteer militia company under the 14th Regiment, Arkansas State Militia of Poinsett County, Arkansas, with commissions being issued to the company officers on August 1, 1861.
- Company D – Commanded by Captain Andrew Balfour from Lawrence County, Arkansas. The company officers were issued militia commissions as officers of a volunteer militia company under the 14th Regiment, Arkansas State Militia of Poinsett County, Arkansas, with commissions being issued on August 12, 1861.
- Company F – "Rough and Ready", commanded by Captain Thomas Wilds from Greene County, Arkansas. The company was originally organized as a volunteer militia company in the 14th Militia Regiment, under the command of Captain William F. J. Clements with commissions being issued on August 10, 1862. The clerk which recorded the commissions inserted a note "Greene County" in the list of Commissioned Officers with this company.
- Company G – Commanded by Captain Hogan W. Murphy from St. Francis County, Arkansas.
- Company H – the "Mound City Greys", commanded by Captain Braxton C. Crump from Crittenden County, Arkansas. The company was originally organized as a volunteer militia company under the 30th Regiment, Arkansas State Militia of Poinsett County, Arkansas, with commissions being issued to the officers on July 5, 1861.
- Company I – the "Confederate Greys", commanded by Captain James M. Pollard from Craighead County, Arkansas. The company was originally organized as a volunteer militia company under the 55th Regiment, Arkansas State Militia of Craighead County, Arkansas, with commissions being issued to the officers on August 18, 1861.
- Company K – the "Erin Guards," commanded by Captain George B. Hunt from Washington County, Missouri. This company contained a large number of Irish immigrants that had been working in Missouri before the war. These immigrants were led south by Patrick Ahearn. Ahearn had belong to a Missouri State Guard company which was captured at Camp Jackson, outside of St. Louis. Ahearn had disguised his men as a gang of laborers, and moved south, eventually coming in contact with a Captain Hunt, whose company apparently also contained Irishmen. The two groups united to become Company K.

The original regimental officers elected at the formation of the regiment were:

- James C. Tappan, colonel
- A. D. Grayson, lieutenant colonel
- James A. McNeely, major
- William N. Mercer, adjutant
- P. Van Patten, surgeon
- E. T. Wimpy, hospital steward

== Battles ==
The 13th Arkansas was ordered to a camp at Belmont, Missouri, just across the river from Columbus, Kentucky. On November 7, 1861, Brigadier General Ulysses S. Grant landed troops from Cairo, Illinois, via steamer on the Missouri side of the river. The "Camp of Observation", occupied by the 13th Arkansas, was briefly overrun by Union forces, who set fire to the camp. Grant's forces were eventually driven off and, in the process, the 13th gained its first combat experience. Unfortunately in the process, it lost its original muster rolls which were lost when the regiment's camp was burned. As a result, the oldest surviving documents are from the regimental reorganization that took place nine months later in April 1862. Consequently, the names of several hundred of the regiment's original members have been lost to history.

After the losses of Fort Henry and Fort Donelson in February 1862, Confederate General Albert Sidney Johnston withdrew his forces into western Tennessee, northern Mississippi, and Alabama to reorganize. The 13th Arkansas was assigned to Brigadier General Alexander P. Stewart's 2nd Brigade of Brigadier General Charles Clark's 1st Division of Major General Leonidas Polk's 1st Army Corps, of General Albert S. Johnston's Army of Mississippi. The regiment suffered heavy casualties at the Battle of Shiloh. It lost 100 soldiers killed, wounded and missing, which represented almost one third of the 306 engaged there. Colonel Tappan was sick and absent on the first day of the battle so command fell to Lieutenant Colonel A. D. Grayson, who was killed in action while leading a charge. Upon Grayson's death, command of the regiment fell to Major James A. McNeely.

In April 1862 the Confederate Army underwent an army-wide reorganization due to the passage of the Conscription Act by the Confederate Congress in April 1962. All twelve-month regiments had to re-muster and enlist for two years or the duration of the war; a new election of officers was ordered; and men who were exempted from service by age or other reasons under the Conscription Act were allowed to take a discharge and go home. Officers who did not choose to stand for re-election were also offered a discharge. The reorganization was accomplished among all the Arkansas regiments in and around Corinth, Mississippi, following the Battle of Shiloh. The 13th Arkansas reorganized for the war on April 29, 1862, and the following field officers were elected:

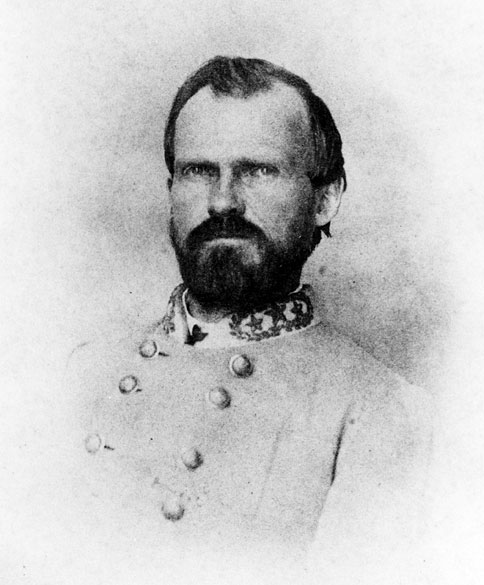
Colonel James C. Tappan, 13th Arkansas Infantry Regiment

- James A. McNeely, Colonel (Resigned 27 May 1862)
- A. R. Brown, Lieutenant Colonel
- R. A. Duncan, Major
- Jasper F. Butler, Surgeon
- A. W. Cole, Assistant Surgeon
- Abner M. Casey, Chaplain
- B. B. Casey, Ordnance Sergeant

As a result of the reorganization in April 1862, the companies were re-lettered and new commanders were elected as follows:

- Company A – Captain George B. Hunt (originally Company K)
- Company B – Captain Hiram F. Tennison (originally Company E)
- Company C – Captain D. W. Hoshall (originally Company A)
- Company D – Captain Thomas R. Shelton (originally Company B)
- Company E – Captain Reginald H. Thompson (see note)
- Company F – Captain James H. Lloyd (originally Company D)
- Company G – Captain Luther Dunn (originally Company G)
- Company H – Captain Henry M. Ellis (originally Company H)
- Company I – Captain Ivey S. Hughes (originally Company I)
- Company K – Captain James M. Levesque (originally Company C)

Note: Company E (originally commanded by Captain R. C. Flournoy), from Desha County, had been attached to the 7th Kentucky Infantry as (old) Company K. It was transferred to the 13th Arkansas in the reorganization.

Despite their heavy losses at Shiloh the regiment continued to function as a part of the Army of the Mississippi. By the time they took part in the Battle of Perryville the regiment had been consolidated with the 15th Arkansas Infantry Regiment (Josey's), which had formerly been commanded by Colonel Cleburne. The unit was assigned to Brigadier General Patrick Ronayne Cleburne's 2nd Brigade of Major General Simon Bolivar Buckner's 3rd Division of William Joseph Hardee's Corps of the Army of Mississippi. The regiment lost 6 killed and 23 wounded at the Battle of Richmond, Kentucky.

After the Kentucky Campaign, the unit was assigned to General Liddell/Govan's Brigade, Cleburn's Division, Army of Tennessee. It would remain in this brigade for the rest of the war. In 1863, the 13th Arkansas was consolidated with the 15th Arkansas Infantry Regiment and placed under the command of Colonel Lucius E. Polk of the 15th. It was consolidated with the 15th Arkansas at Murfreesboro. The 13th/15th reported 68 casualties in the fight at Murfreesboro.

The 13th was field consolidated with the 5th Arkansas in September, 1863 and remained consolidated with the 5th until the closing month of the war. The regiment took part in the Battle of Chickamauga and the Tullahoma Campaign along with many other major engagements. The 5th/13th lost forty-five percent of the 450 at Chickamauga, had 21 men disabled at Ringgold Gap, totaled 321 men and 222 arms in December 1863, and reported 112 casualties at the Battle of Atlanta.

The regiment and the rest of Govan's Brigade participated in General John B. Hood's disastrous Franklin-Nashville Campaign. Due to the appalling losses suffered by Govan's Brigade during the Atlanta Campaign, the 1st/15th, 5th/13th and 2nd/24th Arkansas Regiments were consolidated into one regiment, which was commanded by Colonel Peter Green of the 5th/13th (specifically of the 5th). The other officers of the consolidated regiment were Major Alexander T. Meek, of the 2nd/24th Arkansas, Captain Mordecai P. Garrett and Sergeant Major Thomas Benton Moncrief of the 15th Arkansas. The consolidated regiment fought under the colors of the consolidated 5th/13th Arkansas Regiment, because this was one of the only colors not captured when Govan's Brigade was overrun at the Battle of Jonesboro. The flag of the combined 5th/13th Arkansas was issued in March 1864 and was captured by Benjamin Newman of the 88th Illinois Infantry at the battle of Franklin. The consolidated regiment numbered just 300 rifles and sustained 66% casualties during the Battle of Franklin.

The remnants of Govan's Brigade that survived the Tennessee Campaign remained with the Army of Tennessee through its final engagements in the 1865 Carolinas campaign. The 13th Arkansas is credited with the following engagements:

- Battle of Belmont, Kentucky, November 7, 1861.
- Battle of Shiloh, Tennessee, April 6–7, 1862.
- Siege of Corinth, April to June 1862.
- Kentucky Campaign, Kentucky, August–October, 1862
  - Battle of Richmond, Kentucky, August 29–30, 1862.
  - Battle of Perryville, Kentucky, October 8, 1862.
- Battle of Murfreesboro, Tennessee, December 31, 1862, to January 3, 1863.
- Tullahoma Campaign, June 1863.
  - Battle of Liberty Gap, Tennessee, June 24–26, 1863.
- Chickamauga Campaign, Georgia, August–September, 1863.
  - Battle of Chickamauga, Georgia, September 19–20, 1863.
- Chattanooga campaign, September to November 1863.
  - Battle of Missionary Ridge, Tennessee, November 25, 1863.
  - Battle of Ringgold Gap, Georgia, November 27, 1863.
- Atlanta campaign, May to September 1864.
  - Battle of Rocky Face Ridge, Georgia, May 5–11, 1864.
  - Battle of Resaca, Georgia, May 14–15, 1864.
  - Battle of New Hope Church, Georgia, May 25 – June 4, 1864.
  - Battle of Pickett's Mill, Georgina, May 27, 1864.
  - Battle of Kennesaw Mountain, Georgia, June 27, 1864.
  - Battle of Peachtree Creek, Georgia, July 20, 1864.
  - Siege of Atlanta, Georgia, July 22, 1864.
  - Battle of Jonesboro, Georgia, August 31 to September 1, 1864.
- Franklin–Nashville Campaign, Alabama, Georgia, and Tennessee, September 18 to December 27, 1864
  - Battle of Franklin, Tennessee, November 30, 1864.
  - Battle of Nashville, Tennessee, December 15–16, 1864.
- Carolinas campaign, February to April 1865.
  - Battle of Bentonville, North Carolina, March 19–21, 1865.

== African Americans in Confederate Service ==
A Lieutenant Shelton of the 13th Arkansas apparently took an African American slave with him to battle:

In the recent battle of Belmont, lieutenant Shelton, of the 13th Arkansas Infantry regiment, had his servant Jack in the fight. Both Jack and his master were wounded, but not till they had made most heroic efforts to drive back the insolent invaders. Finally, after Jack had fired at the enemy twenty-seven times, he fell seriously wounded in the arm. Jacks' son was upon the field, and loaded the rifle for his father, who shot at the enemy three times after he was upon the ground. Jack’s son hid behind a tree, and when the enemy retreated, they took him to Cairo and refused to let him return. Jack was taken from the field in great pain, and brought to the Overton Hospital, where he bore his sufferings with great fortitude till death relieved him of his pains yesterday. His example may throw a flood of light upon the fancied philanthropy of abolitionism. Jack was a brave and obedient servant, and deserves all praise for his heroic conduct upon the bloody field of Belmont.

== Flags ==
There are three flags associated with the 13th Arkansas known to be in existence; the flag of the Erin Guards, Company K, and the flag of the combined 5th and 13th Arkansas Infantry regiment. The flag of the Erin Guards is a 1st National Flag Pattern with the words "VICTORY or DEATH" inscribed on the white strip. The flag had a circle of ten stars on a blue field with an eleventh star in the center of the circle. The flag is currently in the collection of the Missouri Historical Society in St. Louis, Missouri.

The flag of the 5th and 13th Consolidated Arkansas Infantry Regiment, and its flag staff, are thought to be in private hands. The flag of the combined 5th/13th Arkansas was issued in March, 1864 and was captured by Benjamin Newman of the 88th Illinois Infantry at the battle of Franklin, Tennessee. The flag-staff for this flag is also in private hands and it is stenciled; "5th & 6th Arkansas – B. Newman". The curator of the Carter House in Franklin, Tom Carter, says it was mistakenly labeled, and should have been the "5th & 13th", which were consolidated at the time of the battle. The 6th Arkansas by that time was consolidated with the 7th Arkansas. Research shows the flag at that time was a "white moon on a blue field". The 5th/13th Arkansas flag, was one of five captured by the 88th Illinois at the Battle of Franklin, and none were forwarded to the War Department. It was last seen at Nashville when the 88th Illinois displayed the captured flags to General Thomas. The division commander stated, "They were afterward sent home by those who captured them. Since then they have been ordered to be returned, and will be forwarded to department headquarters as soon as they arrive." However, none were ever returned.

There is a mention of another flag carried by the regiment in Washington Letter article in 1885. The flag was described as: "...It is a blue flag with a white cross..."

== Consolidation and surrender ==
The remnants of ten depleted Arkansas regiments, along with one mostly-Arkansas regiment, in the Army of Tennessee were consolidated into a single regiment at Smithfield, North Carolina, on April 9, 1865. The 1st Arkansas, was lumped together with the 2nd, 5th, 6th, 7th, 8th, 15th, 19th and 24th Arkansas Infantry Regiments and the 3rd Confederate Infantry Regiment as the 1st Arkansas Consolidated Infantry. On April 26, 1865, the 1st Arkansas Consolidated Infantry Regiment was present with the Army of Tennessee when it surrendered in Greensboro, North Carolina.

== See also ==
- List of Confederate units from Arkansas
- Confederate Units by State
