= Daniel M. Frost =

American politician (1823–1900)

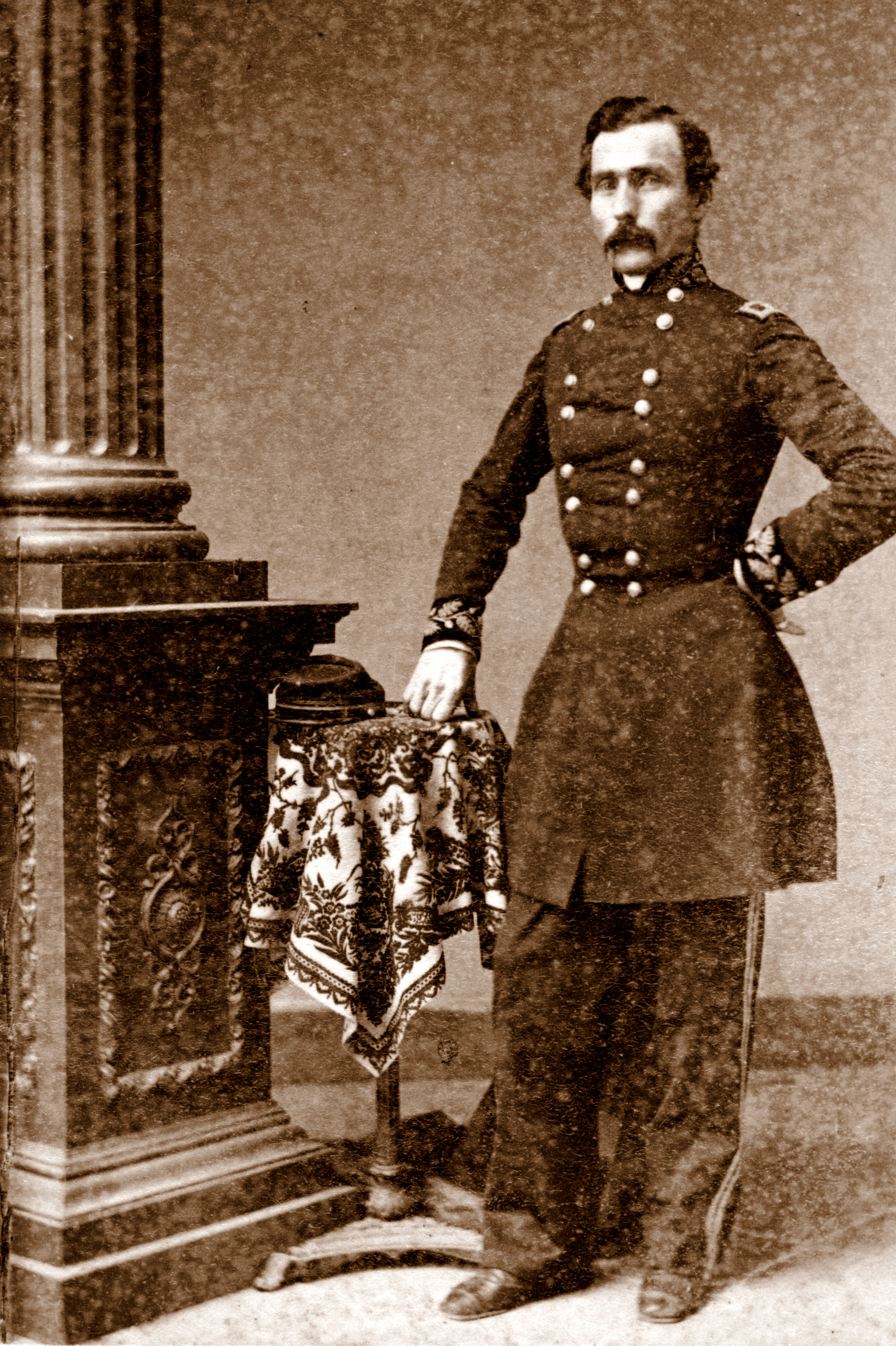
- Frost in uniform, c. 1861
- Born: Daniel Marsh Frost; August 9, 1823; Duanesburg, New York, U.S.
- Died: October 29, 1900 (aged 77); Hazelwood, Missouri, U.S.
- Burial place: Calvary Cemetery; St. Louis, Missouri, U.S.
- Military career
- Allegiance: United States; Confederate States
- Branch: United States Army; Confederate States Army
- Service years: 1844–1853 (USA); 1861–1863 (CSA)
- Rank: First Lieutenant (USA); Brigadier-General (MVM); Brigadier-General (CSA)
- Commands: Frost's Division
- Conflicts: Mexican–American War; Battle of Cerro Gordo; American Indian Wars; American Civil War; Camp Jackson Affair (surrendered); Battle of Pea Ridge; Battle of Prairie Grove

Daniel Marsh Frost (August 9, 1823 – October 29, 1900) was a former United States Army officer who became a brigadier general in the Missouri Volunteer Militia (MVM) and the Confederate States Army during the American Civil War. Among the handful of Confederate generals born in the North, Frost led the MVM during the Camp Jackson affair in May 1861 that fanned civil unrest in St. Louis.

== Early and family life ==
Daniel M. Frost was born near Duanesburg in rural Schenectady County, New York. He was a descendant of the Winthrop family through Elizabeth Fones, and a descendant of John Bowne.

He was appointed from New York to the United States Military Academy in nearby West Point and graduated in 1844, ranking 4th in a class of 24.

In 1851, Frost met and married Elizabeth Brown "Lily" Graham, his second wife. They would have eleven children.

== U.S. Army and Missouri life ==
Frost was brevetted as a second lieutenant in the infantry and assigned to garrison duty. With the outbreak of the Mexican–American War, he served under Winfield Scott in the Army of Occupation in Mexico and was brevetted for gallantry in action at the Battle of Cerro Gordo. Following that war, Frost spent part of 1849 as Regimental Quartermaster of an immense supply train sent to the Oregon Territory. The following year he was assigned to Jefferson Barracks in St. Louis, the largest base in the west. After a brief assignment in Europe, Frost returned to the United States. He rejoined his regiment on the Texas frontier. In a skirmish with raiding Indians, he was severely wounded and nearly lost an eye.

Frost resigned his commission in 1853 for domestic reasons and became a partner in a lumber planing mill. He later established D. M. Frost & Co., a prominent fur-trading company from Kansas to the West Coast. Politically active, Frost was elected in 1854 to the Missouri General Assembly as a senator from Benton County and was a strong supporter of "Central Clique" of wealthy planters in Missouri state politics. He worked against the Benton faction of the Missouri Democratic Party, and worked for the expansion of slavery into the Kansas Territory. He served until 1858.

Frost stayed involved with the army by serving on the Board of Visitors for West Point, and was appointed as a brigadier general in the Missouri Volunteer Militia in 1858 by the Governor of Missouri, Robert Marcellus Stewart. He was assigned command of the First Military District, which encompassed St. Louis and the surrounding county.

== American Civil War ==
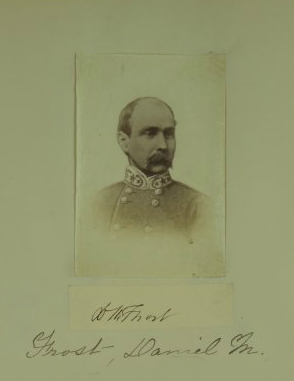
Frost in the Civil War

In the early days of the American Civil War, General Frost supported the secessionist movement endorsed and led by Governor Claiborne Fox Jackson. In February 1861 Frost enrolled the members of the pro-secession Minutemen para-military organization as Companies in a new Second Regiment, MVM (despite Missouri's "official" policy of neutrality). This allowed the Minutemen to operate and recruit overtly. He secretly met with Jackson and other secessionist leaders to discuss the possibility of attacking the Federal Arsenal in downtown St. Louis. Governor Jackson dispatched two members of the Minutemen to seek siege artillery from the Confederate Government. At the recommendation of General Frost, Governor Jackson ordered the mustering in of the MVM in St. Louis on May 6, a deployment which would allow an attack on the Arsenal when the Confederate artillery arrived.

Confederate President Jefferson Davis agreed to provide the weapons, and they arrived in St. Louis on May 8. Frost's soldiers took possession of the Confederate weapons, and moved them to Camp Jackson, as the MVM encampment was named. Union Captain Nathaniel Lyon conducted a reconnaissance on May 9, and verified the presence of the Confederate weapons. The next day, Lyon led a mixed force of U.S. Regular troops and Missouri volunteers to arrest the Militia. After surrounding the camp, they forced Frost and his militiamen to surrender without a shot being fired. As the prisoners were marched through the streets of St. Louis, however a riot broke out and 28 people were killed. On May 11, Frost was paroled and returning to his home.

Although he initially denied involvement in any conspiracy when questioned by authorities, Union intelligence later obtained a letter that revealed that Frost was indeed an active participant in Governor Jackson's plotting.

After being exchanged for a captured Federal officer, Frost traveled south to join the Confederate Army. On March 3, 1862, Frost was commissioned as a Brigadier General in the Confederate Army and assigned to duty in Memphis, Tennessee, under Major General Sterling Price. He briefly served as the inspector general in the army of Gen. Braxton Bragg, and then in October was assigned to the Trans-Mississippi Department. Frost led a division into action at the Battle of Prairie Grove in the corps of Maj. Gen. Thomas C. Hindman. On March 2, 1863, Hindman was relieved of duty and replaced by Frost in Little Rock, Arkansas.

In August 1863, Frost's wife was forced from their home in St. Louis because of the family's ardent Confederate sympathies and had taken the children and moved to Canada for safety and refuge. Frost reacted quickly upon hearing the news. He left the army, without first obtaining any official approval or permission, and traveled to Canada to join his family. Frost was listed as a deserter by the Confederate Army, and in December the Confederate War Department officially dropped Frost from the muster rolls. Frost stayed in Canada for the rest of the war and did not return to Missouri until late 1865.

== Later life ==
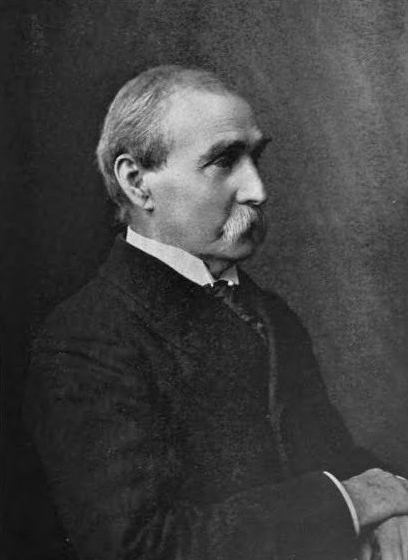
Frost in his later years

Following the war, Frost became a farmer on his land near St. Louis. His second wife died in the early 1870s and Frost later married a third time in 1880, this time to a young widow Catherine Cates (1840–1900) with two children. The couple had two children of their own. In 1875, Frost's daughter Jane Graham married Sir Lewis Molesworth, 11th Baronet.

General Frost spend much of his time in his later years simultaneously explaining: to Unionists that in May 1861 he had not engaged in pro-Confederate plotting, and to ex-Confederates that he had not deserted from the Confederate States Army in 1863. While Frost wrote many post-war articles attempting to explain his contradictory actions during the American Civil War, his memoirs do not address the Civil War period. From 1891 to 1892 he was president of the Aztec Club of 1847.

== Death and legacy ==
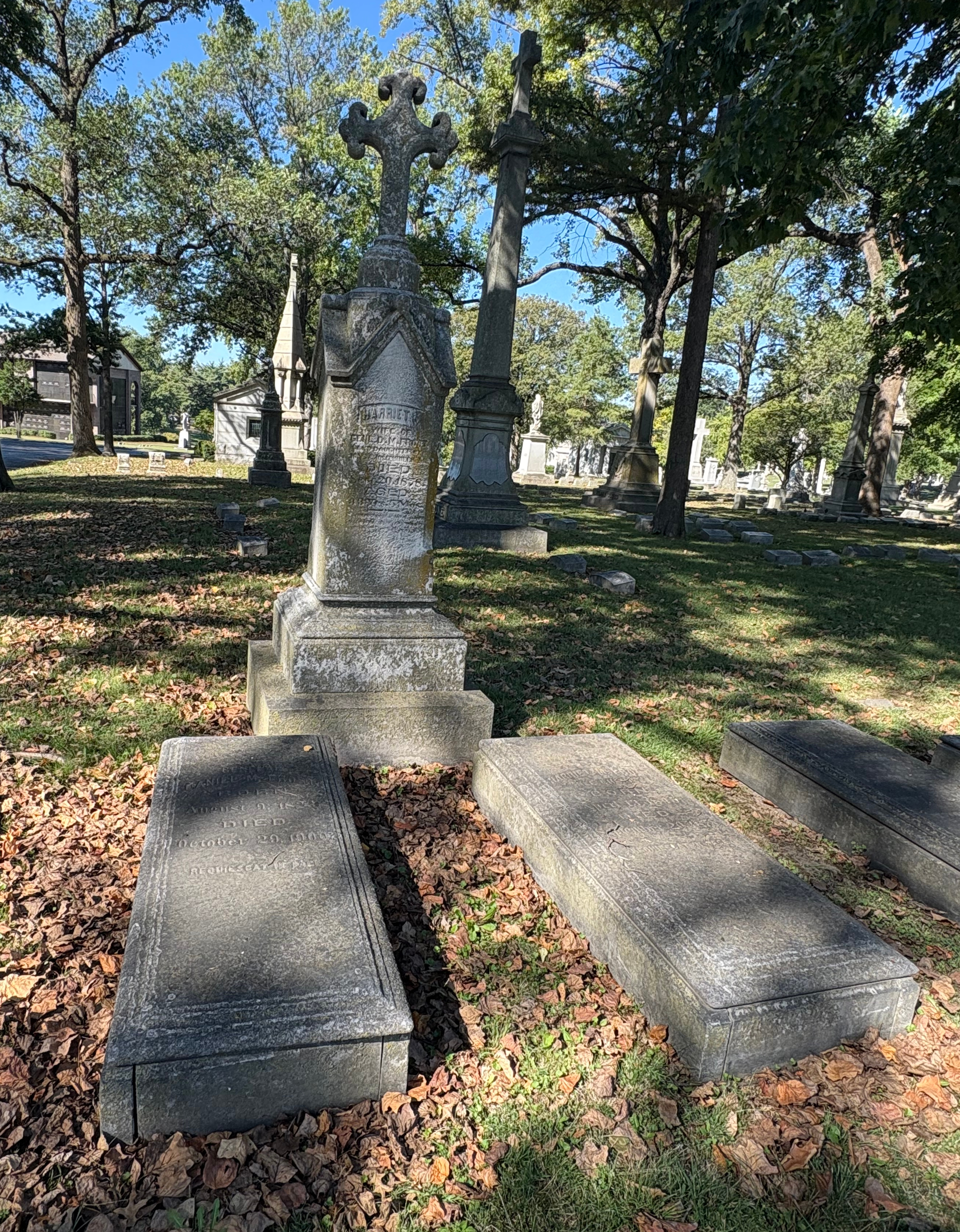
Frost's grave at Calvary Cemetery

At the age of 77, Frost died at Hazelwood, his estate in what is now Berkeley, Missouri (suburban St. Louis). He is interred at Calvary Cemetery, Section 18.

Saint Louis University named its main campus "The Frost Campus" to honor the General after his daughter Mrs. Harriet Frost Fordyce contributed $1,000,000 to the university in 1962. Ironically, part of the Frost Campus covers the former "Camp Jackson" militia encampment site.

== See also ==
- List of American Civil War generals (Confederate)
