= Wade H. Kitchens =

American politician

Wade Kitchens
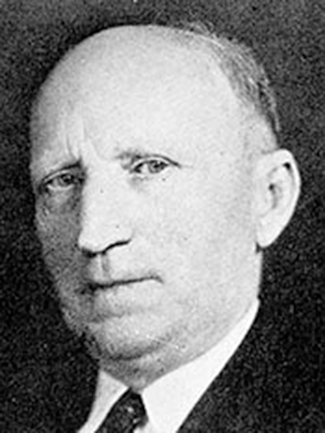

Member of the U.S. House of Representatives from Arkansas's 7th district
- In office January 3, 1937 – January 3, 1941
- Preceded by: Tilman B. Parks
- Succeeded by: Oren Harris

Member of the Arkansas House of Representatives from the Columbia County district
- In office January 14, 1929 – January 9, 1933
- Preceded by: Bonnie Davis
- Succeeded by: Joe L. Davis

Personal details
- Born: December 26, 1878 Falcon, Arkansas, Nevada County, Arkansas, U.S.
- Died: August 22, 1966 (aged 87) Magnolia, Arkansas, U.S.
- Party: Democratic
- Spouse: Lillie Dempsey (m. 1906; died 1966)
- Children: 2
- Education: University of Arkansas; Cumberland School of Law (LLD)
- Profession: Lawyer, politician

Military service
- Allegiance: United States
- Branch/service: Arkansas State Guard; United States Army
- Years of service: 1989; 1900–1902; May 18, 1917–1918
- Rank: Captain
- Unit: 2nd Infantry
- Battles/wars: Spanish–American War; Philippine–American War; World War I

Wade Hampton Kitchens (December 26, 1878 – August 22, 1966) was an Arkansas lawyer and politician. He served as an infantryman and officer in the Arkansas State Guard and the United States Army during three conflicts and practiced law on two continents before entering politics in Arkansas. Kitchens served in the Arkansas House of Representatives from 1929 to 1933, and won election to the United States House of Representatives in 1936.

== Early life and career ==
Born on a farm near Falcon, Nevada County, Arkansas, Kitchens attended the common schools and Southern Academy.

He earned an undergraduate degree from the University of Arkansas in Fayetteville between 1895 and 1898. In 1898 Kitchens served as a sergeant in the Arkansas State Guard (1st Arkansas Volunteer Infantry), during the Spanish–American War. Kitchens returned home and graduated from Cumberland School of Law at Cumberland University at Lebanon, Tennessee, in 1900 and was admitted to the bar. Kitchens enlisted in the United States Army as a private (Company E, Twentieth and Second United States Infantry) to serve in the Philippine–American War from 1900 to 1902. He remained in the Philippines, practicing law at Manila and Lingayen.

Kitchens married Lillie Dempsey in 1906 and returned to the United States in 1909. Now living in Magnolia, Arkansas, Kitchens established a law practice and began to become involved in the community. He served as a delegate to the Democratic state conventions at Little Rock, Arkansas in 1910 and 1912.

During World War I, he enlisted in the United States Army on May 18, 1917. Kitchens was commissioned August 5, 1917 as an infantry captain, and served overseas. He returned to Arkansas in 1918 and resumed practicing law.

== Political career ==
=== Arkansas House of Representatives ===
Kitchens won election to the Arkansas House of Representatives in November 1928. He would enter the 47th Arkansas General Assembly, which was entirely controlled by the Democratic Party (typical during the Solid South period). He would serve alongside Garland Pearce, who had represented Columbia County's other House seat since 1927. Kitchens was re-elected for the 48th Arkansas General Assembly, this time serving Columbia County alongside S. A. Crumpler, but did not seek reelection after his second term.

=== House of Representatives ===
Kitchens was elected as a Democrat to the Seventy-fifth and Seventy-sixth Congresses (January 3, 1937 – January 3, 1941).

He was an unsuccessful candidate for renomination in 1940.

== Later life and death ==
After defeat, Kitchens resumed the practice of law in Magnolia. He died there August 22, 1966, and was interred in Columbia Cemetery, near Waldo, Arkansas.

== Bibliography ==
- Priest, Sharon (1998). Runnells, Jonathan (ed.). Historical Report of the Arkansas Secretary of State. Office of the Arkansas Secretary of State. ISBN 9780313302121. OCLC 40157815.

U.S. House of Representatives
Preceded by Tilman B. Parks	Member of the U.S. House of Representatives from Arkansas's 7th congressional district January 3, 1937 – January 3, 1941	Succeeded by Oren Harris
