= Arkansas State Guard =

The Arkansas State Guard
- Arkansas State Guard Shoulder Sleeve Insignia
- Active: 1942–1945
- Country: United States
- Allegiance: Arkansas
- Branch: Army
- Type: State defense force
- Role: Military reserve force
- Size: 1,500 (approximately)
- Part of: Arkansas Military Department
- Garrison/HQ: Little Rock, AR

Commanders
- Civilian leadership: Governor Homer Martin Adkins, later Governor Benjamin Travis Laney (Governor of the State of Arkansas)
- Commander of the Arkansas State Guard: Colonel Hendrix Lackey (Commanding Colonel, Arkansas State Guard)

The Arkansas State Guard was the official state defense force of the state of Arkansas during World War II. The Arkansas State Guard was created to fulfill the state missions of the Arkansas National Guard while the National Guard was deployed abroad during World War II. As a military unit trained and funded solely by the state, it was immune to federal activation and deployment, unlike the National Guard. As a part of the official militia of the state of Arkansas, it traces its roots back to the militias which fell under state authority prior to the Militia Act of 1903. The Arkansas State Guard is currently inactive following deactivation after the end of World War II; however, the legal framework for a state defense force still exists, making future reactivation of the Arkansas State Guard by the Arkansas General Assembly legally permissible.

== History of predecessor organizations ==
Prior to the creation of the dual federal and state National Guard present today, state and territory militias were largely responsible for national defense. The military of Arkansas was organized as the Arkansas Territorial Militia until the American Civil War.

=== American Civil War ===
During the American Civil War, Arkansas provided both Confederate units and Union units for the war effort. The Union regiments were composed of both southern Unionists and freed Arkansas slaves organized into Union units.

=== Post Reconstruction ===
Following the Civil War, Arkansas began to rebuild its military. As Confederate veterans were banned from membership in the state's military during the Reconstruction Era, the Reconstruction-era state guard was composed primarily of black Union Army veterans. The Arkansas State Guard, composed of roughly 2,000 men, began a four-month deployment beginning in November 1868, during which they fought openly with the Ku Klux Klan and arrested numerous Klan members.

During the Spanish–American War, multiple Arkansas units served in the war.

=== World War I ===
As a result of the Militia Act of 1903, each state's militia was reorganized into the National Guard. The deployment of each state's military forces fell to the decision of the federal government rather than the states. States which wanted to maintain a military force in order to protect against invasion, sabotage, riots, natural or man-made disasters while their National Guard was deployed were forced to create independent units solely under state control. The modern state defense force was born as a result. In Arkansas, this unit was known as the Home Guard. The first units was created in September 1917 and would grow to strength of 64 companies. Following the end of the war, the Home Guard was demobilized, and its officers were ordered to turn in all weapons and equipment under General Orders Number 17, dated December 2, 1920.

== World War II ==
After the attack on Pearl Harbor and entry of the United States into World War II, individual states began raising military forces in an effort to ensure homeland security while the National Guard was deployed. Arkansas activated the Guard when Hendrix Lackey, a veteran of World War I, was appointed commander of the Arkansas State Guard on January 12, 1942.

=== Duties ===
During the war, the Arkansas State Guard was called into service on several occasions, primarily for protection of infrastructure against saboteurs, disaster recovery, and aiding in searches for missing persons. The missions assigned to the Guard included:

- guarding dams near Hot Springs against sabotage
- directing and guarding property in the aftermath tornadoes in Berryville (November 1–3, 1942), Camden in April 1944 and in Johnson County in April 1945
- numerous search-and-rescue operations including: looking for a missing child in Searcy County in November 1943; a man who went missing near Malvern in December 1943; a woman missing in woman in Devil's Den State Park in July 1944.

One of the largest deployments occurred after a flood along the Arkansas river in May 1943. For nearly three weeks, roughly 450 Guardsmen "patrolled levees, assisted in evacuation of flooded areas, stood guard duty, repaired waterlines, and crewed boats on the river" after the flood. The State Guard was again called on to perform similar duties during flooding on the Arkansas and Ouachita rivers in April 1945.

== Disbandment ==
The State Guard was disbanded on December 16, 1946, after the Arkansas National Guard was returned to state control.

== Legal status ==
State defense forces are permitted in all the states and territories which make up the United States. Currently, 22 states and the territory of Puerto Rico maintain active state defense forces. Arkansas law also permits the deployment of a state defense force by the Governor of Arkansas under § 12-61-301. The State Guard was originally authorized by Act 85 of 1929 of the Arkansas General Assembly, which allowed for the governor to call the guard into service when seventy-five percent of the Arkansas National Guard was federally deployed. However, in 1989, the law was amended to give the governor authority to call the Arkansas State Guard into active duty when deemed necessary to supplement the National Guard. In the same bill the legislature changed the name from the Arkansas State Guard to the Arkansas State Defense Force. Therefore, although the Arkansas State Guard went inactive after World War II, the Arkansas State Defense Force can be reactivated by the Arkansas General Assembly, as the existence of such a military force is already sanctioned under both United States and Arkansas law.

== See also ==
- Arkansas Territorial Militia
- Arkansas State Guard and the Spanish–American War
- Arkansas Wing Civil Air Patrol
