= Conscription Act =

Possible Conscription Acts:

== United Kingdom ==
- Military Service Act (United Kingdom)

== United States ==
- Militia Act of 1792
- Enrollment Act of 1863
