= Arkansas's 7th congressional district =

Former congressional district

- Obsolete district
- Created: 1900
- Eliminated: 1950
- Years active: 1903-1953

The Arkansas's 7th congressional district was a congressional district for the United States House of Representatives in Arkansas from 1903 to 1953.

The district comprised the following counties:

1. Ashley
2. Bradley
3. Calhoun
4. Chicot
5. Clark
6. Columbia
7. Hempstead
8. Lafayette
9. Nevada
10. Ouachita
11. Union.

== List of members representing the district ==
Member	Party	Years	Cong ress	Electoral history
District created March 4, 1903
Robert M. Wallace (Magnolia)	Democratic	March 4, 1903 – March 3, 1911	58th 59th 60th 61st	Elected in 1902. Re-elected in 1904. Re-elected in 1906. Re-elected in 1908. Lost renomination.
William S. Goodwin (Warren)	Democratic	March 4, 1911 – March 3, 1921	62nd 63rd 64th 65th 66th	Elected in 1910. Re-elected in 1912. Re-elected in 1914. Re-elected in 1916. Re-elected in 1918. Lost renomination.
Tilman B. Parks (Camden)	Democratic	March 4, 1921 – January 3, 1937	67th 68th 69th 70th 71st 72nd 73rd 74th	Elected in 1920. Re-elected in 1922. Re-elected in 1924. Re-elected in 1926. Re-elected in 1928. Re-elected in 1930. Re-elected in 1932. Re-elected in 1934. Retired.
Wade H. Kitchens (Magnolia)	Democratic	January 3, 1937 – January 3, 1941	75th 76th	Elected in 1936. Re-elected in 1938. Lost renomination.
Oren Harris (El Dorado)	Democratic	January 3, 1941 – January 3, 1953	77th 78th 79th 80th 81st 82nd	Elected in 1940. Re-elected in 1942. Re-elected in 1944. Re-elected in 1946. Re-elected in 1948. Re-elected in 1950. Redistricted to the 4th district.
District eliminated January 3, 1953
