= Robert M. Wallace (politician) =

American politician (1856–1942)

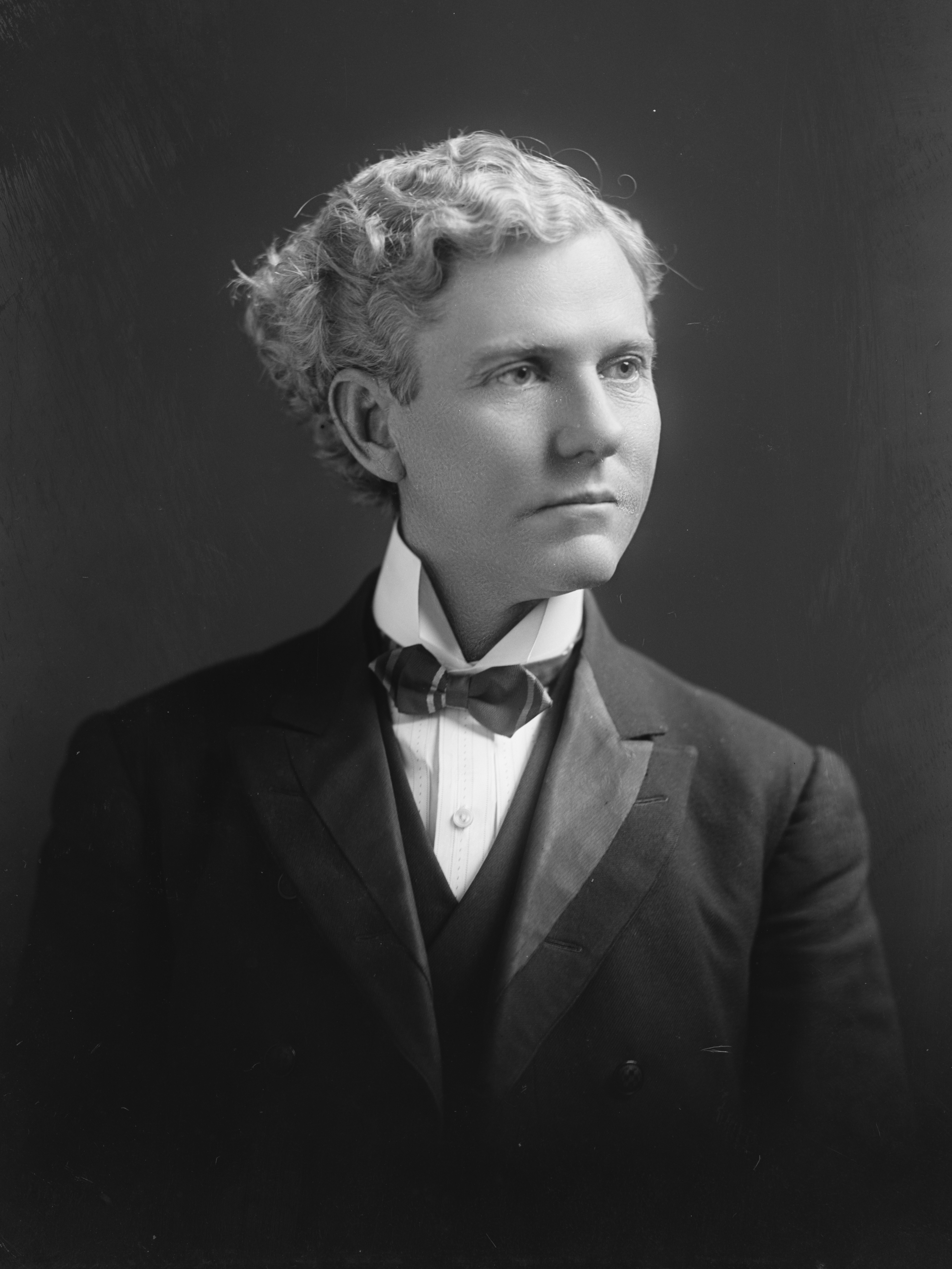
- Robert M. Wallace photographed in C. M. Bell's studio

Member of the U.S. House of Representatives from Arkansas's 7th district
- In office March 4, 1903 – March 3, 1911
- Preceded by: new district
- Succeeded by: William S. Goodwin

Member of the Arkansas House of Representatives
- In office 1881-1882

Personal details
- Born: August 6, 1856 New London, Arkansas, U.S.
- Died: November 9, 1942 (aged 86) Magnolia, Arkansas, U.S.
- Resting place: Magnolia Cemetery
- Party: Democratic

Robert Minor Wallace (August 6, 1856 – November 9, 1942) was an American lawyer and politician who served four terms as a U.S. representative from Arkansas from 1903 to 1911.

== Early life and education ==
Born in New London, Arkansas, Wallace attended the common schools, and was graduated from Arizona Seminary, Arizona, Louisiana, in 1876. He studied law.

== Career ==
He was admitted to the bar at Little Rock, Arkansas, in 1879 and commenced the practice of law in El Dorado, Arkansas. He served as member of the State house of representatives in 1881 and 1882. United States post office inspector 1887–1891. He served as prosecuting attorney for the thirteenth judicial circuit of Arkansas in 1891 and 1892. He served as assistant United States attorney in 1894.

=== Congress ===
Wallace was elected as a Democrat to the Fifty-eighth and to the three succeeding Congresses (March 4, 1903 – March 3, 1911). He was an unsuccessful candidate for renomination in 1910 to the Sixty-second Congress.

== Later career and death ==
He resumed the practice of his profession at Hot Springs and Little Rock and also engaged in lecturing for the Chautauqua and for the Anti-Saloon League.

He moved to Magnolia, Arkansas, where he died on November 9, 1942. He was interred in Magnolia Cemetery.

U.S. House of Representatives
New district	Member of the U.S. House of Representatives from Arkansas's 7th congressional district March 4, 1903 – March 3, 1911	Succeeded by William S. Goodwin
