= Tilman B. Parks =

American politician (1872–1950)

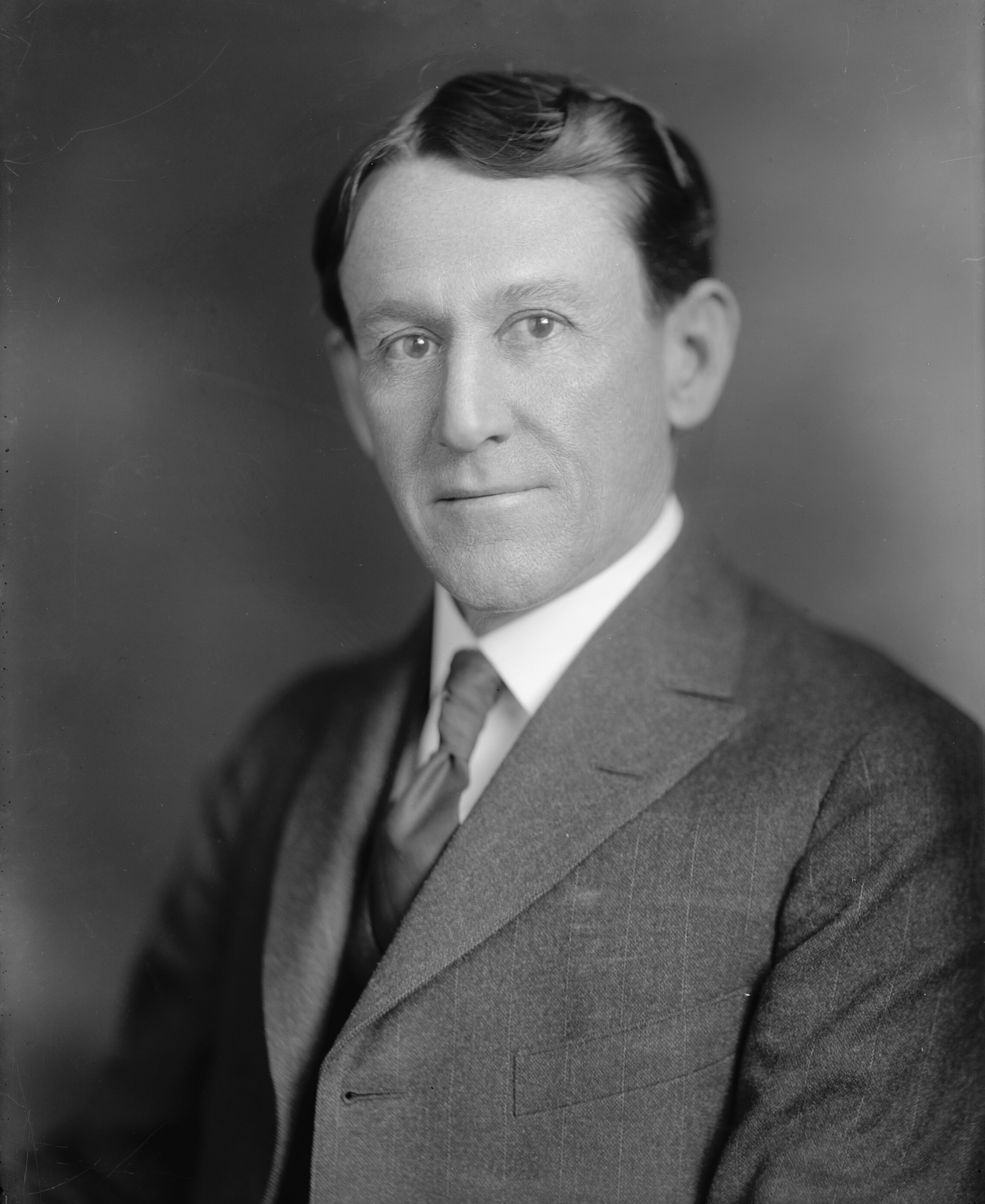

Member of the U.S. House of Representatives from Arkansas's 7th district
- In office March 4, 1921 – January 3, 1937
- Preceded by: William S. Goodwin
- Succeeded by: Wade Kitchens

Personal details
- Born: Tilman Bacon Parks; May 14, 1872 Lewisville, Arkansas, U.S.
- Died: February 12, 1950 (aged 77) Washington, D.C., U.S.
- Resting place: Congressional Cemetery
- Party: Democratic

Tilman Bacon Parks (May 14, 1872 – February 12, 1950) was an American lawyer and politician who served eight terms as a U.S. representative from Arkansas from 1921 to 1937.

== Early life and education ==
Born near Lewisville, Arkansas on May 14, 1872, Parks attended the local common schools. He then attended the University of Texas at Austin and the University of Virginia at Charlottesville.

He studied law and was admitted to the bar in 1900, after which he opened a private law practice in Lewisville.

== Political career ==
He served as member of the Arkansas House of Representatives from 1901 to 1904, then again from 1909 to 1911.

In 1904, he was selected by the Democratic Party to be a presidential elector. He served as temporary chairman of the Democratic State convention in 1910, and then as prosecuting attorney of the eighth judicial circuit of Arkansas from 1914 to 1918.

In 1915 he moved to Hope, Arkansas, where he engaged in the practice of law.

=== Tenure in Congress ===
In 1920, Parks sought election to the U.S. House of Representatives, challenging incumbent Congressman William S. Goodwin. Tilman won a close primary election and was elected as a Democrat to the Sixty-seventh Congress with more than 70% of the vote. He then won re-election to the seven succeeding Congresses (March 4, 1921 – January 3, 1937).

During his tenure, Tilman served at various times on the Accounts Committee, the Education Committee, the Expenditures on the Interior Committee, the Interstate and Foreign Committee, the Rivers and Harbors Committee, and on the powerful Appropriations Committee.

Although he was usually unopposed or faced only token opposition for re-election, Tilman in 1934 was involved in a bitterly contested election against local attorney Wade Kitchens. Tilman was declared the winner, but several months later a federal court overturned the results based upon allegations of fraud. Nevertheless, because the House had already seated Tilman, he remained in office for the duration of his term.

Knowing his political vulnerability, Tilman was not a candidate for renomination in 1936.

== Life after Congress ==
He continued the practice of law until his retirement. His wife, Fay Newton Parks died in 1928 while Tilman was still in office. As his health declined later in life, Tilman lived with his son before being institutionalized for several years due to severe illness.

== Death and burial ==
He died in Washington, D.C., February 12, 1950. He was interred in the Congressional Cemetery.

U.S. House of Representatives
| Preceded by William S. Goodwin | Member of the U.S. House of Representatives from Arkansas's 7th congressional district March 4, 1921 – January 3, 1937 | Succeeded by Wade H. Kitchens |
