= William S. Goodwin =

American politician

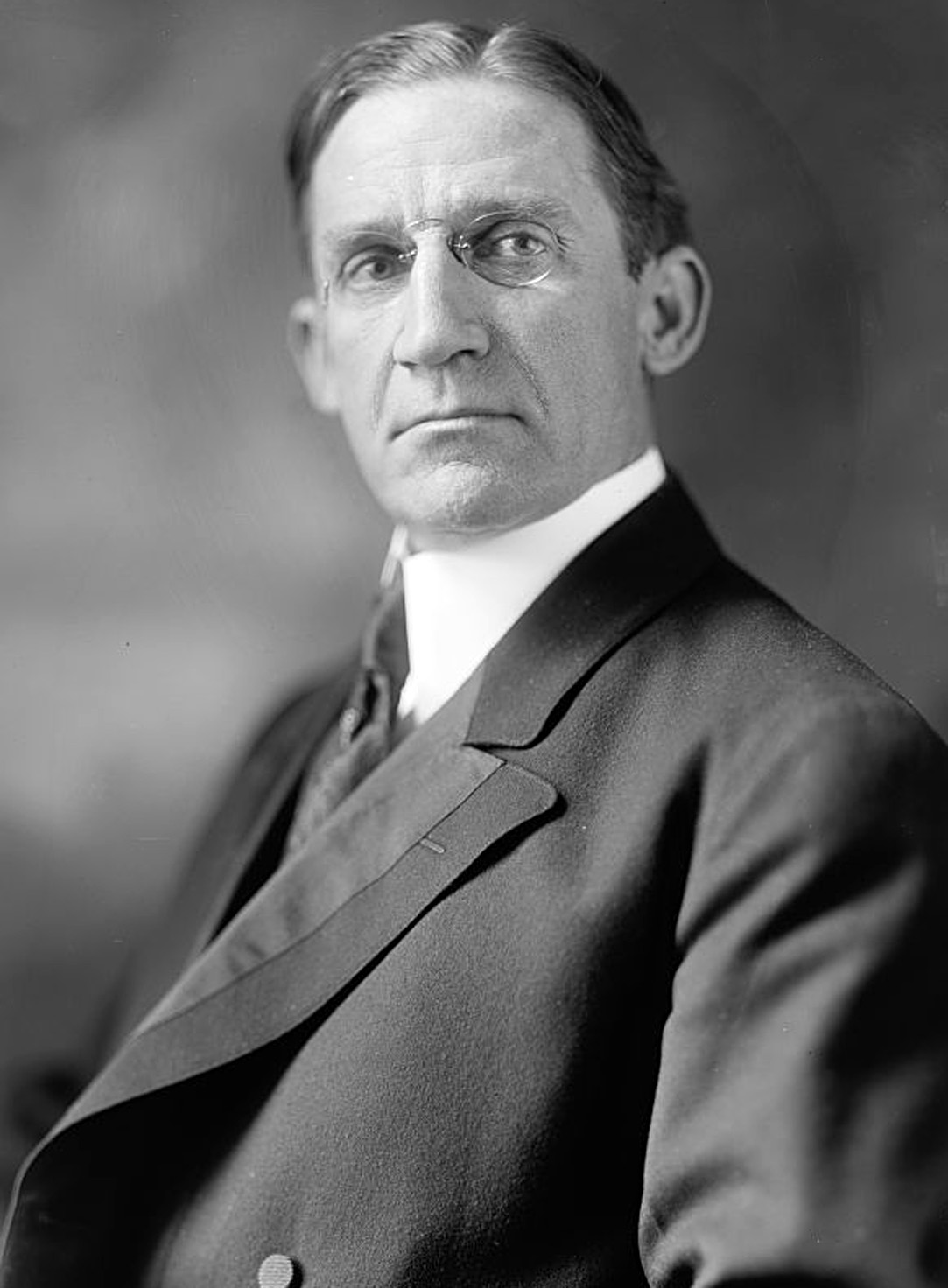

Member of the U.S. House of Representatives from Arkansas's 7th district
- In office March 4, 1911 – March 3, 1921
- Preceded by: Robert M. Wallace
- Succeeded by: Tilman Parks

Personal details
- Born: May 2, 1866 Warren, Arkansas, U.S.
- Died: August 9, 1937 (aged 71) Warren, Arkansas, U.S.
- Resting place: Oak Lawn Cemetery
- Party: Democratic

William Shields Goodwin (May 2, 1866 – August 9, 1937) was an American lawyer and politician who served five terms as a United States representative from Arkansas from 1911 to 1921.

== Biography ==
Born in Warren, Arkansas, Goodwin attended the public schools, the Farmers' Academy near Duluth, Georgia, Cooledge's Preparatory School, Moore's College, Atlanta, Georgia, and the Universities of Arkansas and Mississippi. He studied law. He was admitted to the bar in 1894 and commenced practice in Warren, Arkansas.

=== Career ===
He served as member of the Arkansas House of Representatives in 1895, and in the Arkansas Senate from 1905 to 1909. He served as member of the board of trustees of the University of Arkansas at Fayetteville 1907 to 1911.

==== Congress ====
Goodwin was elected as a Democrat to the Sixty-second and to the four succeeding Congresses (March 4, 1911 – March 3, 1921). He was an unsuccessful candidate for renomination in 1920, losing the primary election to Tilman Parks.

=== Later career and death ===
After leaving Congress, Goodwin returned to the practice of law in Warren, Arkansas.

He died there on August 9, 1937, and was interred in Oak Lawn Cemetery.

U.S. House of Representatives
Preceded by Robert M. Wallace	Member of the U.S. House of Representatives from Arkansas's 7th congressional district March 4, 1911 – March 3, 1921	Succeeded by Tilman B. Parks
