= Arkansas State Guard and the Spanish–American War =

The history of the Arkansas State Guard and the Spanish–American War begins with the reorganization of the state militia following the end of Reconstruction. In 1879 the Arkansas Legislature had abolished the office of Adjutant General in retaliation for the use of the state militia to interfere in local political matters during reconstruction. During this period the Governor's Private Secretary performed the duties of the Adjutant General as an additional duty, and the legislature provided no appropriated funds for the state guard. Several companies existed during this period, including the Quapaw Guards and the McCarthy Guard in Little Rock. In 1897 the Arkansas State Guard was reorganized to consist of four infantry regiments, two artillery batteries and a cavalry squadron. In 1897, the state provided two volunteer infantry regiments for the Spanish–American War and although these two Arkansas Volunteer Infantry Regiments were not deployed overseas and did not see actual combat, they did suffer a number of casualties from disease.

== Post Reconstruction ==
Interest in the state militia waned following Reconstruction. Officially the state militia consisted of two regiments of infantry, one battery of artillery, one troop cavalry, and one signal unit. The Regimental headquarters of the 1st Infantry, Arkansas State Guards was located in Little Rock, but with little or no state funding, the militia units that existed were supported with private funds. Local militia companies participated in drill and ceremony competitions, with all the funding for travel, uniforms and equipment coming from private sources.

The Capital City Guards were organized in Little Rock in 1880. This company and the Quapaw Guards escorted Governor Churchill to his inauguration on January 13, 1881.

The Cherokee Guards were an African American company organized in Little Rock in 1881.

The Eagle Guards were organized in Lonoke County, in 1884.

The Faulkner Guards were organized in Faulkner County, in 1884.

The Garland Greys were a militia company organized in Jefferson County and commanded by Captain Sam Hilzheim. In 1881, Hilzheim was ordered to muster black troops into a new company to be called the Neel Guards. However, Hilzheim refused to enroll black troops, and Governor Churchill had him court-martialed. Hilzheim was convicted and sentenced to be suspended from his rank for six months. Governor Churchill revoked the suspension when Captain Hilzheim agreed to obey his orders. The Neel Guards were then mustered into state service in June 1881 The Garland Grey's disbanded following Hilzheim's conviction.

The Hallies Guards were organized in Little Rock in 1880.

The Hot Springs Guards were organized in Hot Springs, Garland County, in 1884. The unit participated in drill competitions with the Quapaw Guard in the summer 1884.

The McCarthy Light Guards were organized in Little Rock in 1887, named for John H. McCarthy, the local business man who paid for their uniforms. The company competed in several drill competitions, including the Interstate Competitive Drill at Galveston, Texas, where the placed third, at Atlanta in 1889 where they were second, in Omaha in 1891 where again were second, and finally at Nashville, Tennessee, where they won first place. The company was invited to attend the Chicago Worlds Far in 1893, and took fourth prize at the Interstate Competitive Drill in its home town of Little Rock in 1894. In 1894 the unit was mobilized to help control with a railroad worker's strike.

The all black Neel Guards were organized in Jefferson County in 1881. A Captain Sam Helzheim was ordered to muster African American volunteers into this company. When Helzheim refused to enroll black men, Governor Churchill had Helzeim court martialed. He was convicted and sentenced to be suspended from his office for six months. Governor Churchill revoked the suspension Helzheim mustered the Neel Guards were mustered into state service in June 1881

The Quapaw Guard was organized in Little Rock in 1880. This company and the Capital City Guards escorted Governor Churchill to his inauguration on January 13, 1881. The unit was deployed to Perry County in the summer of 1881 for three weeks to deal with a general spirit of lawlessness, reported by the county judge. The unit won drill competitions at the state fair against units from Memphis and St. Louis. The unit's armory was located in Little Rock at the corner of Markham and Chester Streets.

== Reorganization of 1891 ==
In 1891, Captain E. D. Thomas, a captain of the 5th Cavalry was ordered to make an inspection of Arkansas State Guard on behalf of the Inspector General of the Army. Upon reaching Little Rock, Captain Thomas found that the only military organizations in existence at that time in the state were at the local level. Captain Thomas indicated that regimental and brigade level organizations had not been maintained in several years. Thomas indicated that the existing local companies were supported through "benevolence and that the state had not even applied to utilize funds for the support of the militia which had recently been approved of by Congress. Captain Thomas' visit apparently spurred the state into action because he indicated that the following order had been issued prior to his departure from Little Rock:

Executive Office, Headquarters Arkansas State Guard,
Little Rock, October 5, 1891.
Order No. 14.

The First Regiment Arkansas State guard is hereby authorized, constituted, and organized, and will be composed of the following companies of the State guard troops, and will hereafter be known and designated as such in official reports and orders from these headquarters. Returns and reports from the different companies composing the same as the First Regiment Arkansas State guard, viz:

Company A, Captain S. A. Horton, Fayetteville, Ark.;
Company B, Captain G. N. Skelton, Fayetteville, Ark.;
Company C, Captain John M. Dungan, Little Rock, Ark.;
Company D, Captain John A. Mitchell, Little Rock, Ark.;
Company E, Captain Ruff Boyett, Hope, Ark.;
Company F, Captain Win. Nichol, Pine Bluff Ark.;
Company G, Captain R. G. Grant., Fort Smith, Ark.;
Company H, Captain J. H. Sarber, Clarksville, Ark.;
Company I, Captain V. J. Stowers, Morrilton, Ark.;
Company K, "Stone's Company," Little Rock, Ark.

The companies will be permitted to retain, when operating independently, their local designation or name. The captains of the companies will report by letter to the colonel commanding the regiment of the exact condition of arms, amount of instruction, uniforms, and number of men available for active service and the average attendance at all the drills.

James P. Eagle,
Governor of Arkansas

The following regimental officers were appointed by Adjutant General Files:

- Colonel John D. Waldron, Commander of the First Regiment Arkansas State Guard, effective October 1, 1891.
- Lieutenant Colonel John M. Dungan
- Major G. C. Schogg
- Captain C. M. Wing appointed as the Regimental Adjutant
- Captain Chas. E. Taylor appointed as the Regimental Quartermaster

Col. Waldron was ordered to take necessary steps to completely organize and equip his regiment, making all necessary appointments of non-commissioned officers. He was authorized to make such visits and inspections as he deemed proper in the performance of his duty.

=== First encampment ===
In the winter of 1892 the Arkansas State Guard conducted its first annual encampment. An encampment was also conducted in the summer of 1893 at Hot Springs. The favorable publicity for these militia encampments led to efforts to improve the organization of the Guard probably resulting in the organization of new military companies:

The Morrison Rifles were organized in Newport Arkansas on August 30, 1892. The company received its financial support from a committee of local businessmen, including Lancelot Minor, a Newport attorney and civic leader. However, the organization failed to complete the state military requirements, and its officers were never commissioned.

The Newport militia company was reorganized May 8, 1893, as the Hurley Rifles, in honor of Captain G. W. Hurley, a veteran of the Mexican War, and the pioneer citizen of Newport. Eugene B. Douglass, for many years an officer of tue Chickasaw Guards, a militia company in Memphis Tennessee was elected Captain. The company met every Monday evening for drill. This company eventually became Company F, 2nd Regiment, Arkansas State Guards. The company officers were:

Eugene B. Douglass, Captain
George A. Hilihouse, First Lieutenant
Rush H. Davis, Second Lieutenant
Charles L. Minor, Third Lieutenant
Sam R. Phillips, Fourth Lieutenant
Adam Bach, Quartermaster

=== 2nd Regiment, Arkansas State Guards, is formed ===
Brigadier General George Presley Taylor, of Forrest City, was appointed commander of the Arkansas State Guard in 1894. As Arkansas State Guard grew in number of companies, and plans were made to divide the state into two regiments shortly after the summer encampment of 1893. The division was not made until January 16, 1894. The dividing line was the thirty-fifth parallel of latitude. The 1st Regiment, Arkansas State Guards, command by Col. F. B. T. Hohenburg, comprised the southern part of the state and a new 2nd Regiment, ASG was formed to include the northern part of the state. Companies in the 2nd Regiment (the northern division) were located at Van Buren, Magazine, Conway, Paragould, Marion, Newport, Fort Smith, Clarksville, Rector and Yellville.

Lancelot Minor, a Newport attorney who had been active in support of the Newport militia company, was appointed Colonel of the 2nd Regiment, Arkansas State Guard. Lieutenant W. R. Samples of the United States Army was assigned to the Arkansas State Guard during the period of reorganization. Lieutenant Samples wrote to Lancelot Minor, January 3, 1893:

For some time I have postponed writing you to inquire if you will accept appointment as Colonel of the 2nd Regt. of Infantry. Please consider the matter and I trust you will accept for the good of the service.

Lieutenant Samples then wrote Governor William M. Fishback, on January 5, 1894:

With your approval I shall recommend for Colonel Hon. L. Minor of Newport, who is well fitted for the office and is actively interested in the State Guard.

On January 15, Lieutenant Samples wrote Col. Minor:

I have the honor to inform you that the Governor has today in accordance with the wishes of the officers of the 2d Regt. of Infantry, appointed you as Colonel of Infantry & you will be assigned to the comm. and of the 2d Regt.

In discussing the appointment, the Arkansas Gazette described Col. Minor as 'one of the best fellows and best known lawyers in the State" On January 23, the Gazette reported: "Col. Minor, of Newport, detailed as Colonel of the Second Regiment of Arkansas State Guard, has assumed command and directs that all company commanders make out and forward to him at once a complete roster of their companies, stating time and place of drills." Colonel Minor appointed Lieutenant Rush H. Davis, of Company F, to serve as adjutant for the regiment, and John Frank Caldwell of Newport (and a Confederate veteran), was appointed regimental quartermaster with the rank of 2nd Lieutenant. On March 24, 1894, Rev. R. B. Willis, of Newport was named chaplain of the Second Regiment. In May, 1894, Lieutenant George A. Hillhouse, of Newport, was appointed Major.

In early March, 1894 companies began receiving complete uniforms, blankets and Rifles. Colonel Minor and his official staff were also supplied with appropriate uniforms, including a saber, belt and shoulder straps for the Colonel.

=== Legislature fails to support ===
The Arkansas Gazette reported on May 28, 1895:

The fact that the recent legislature failed to encourage the state militia and failed to make any appropriation for fostering the citizen soldiery has provoked a disposition on the part of military companies to retire. Four companies were yesterday disbanded at their own request and the resignation of Col. Lancelot Minor, of Newport, was accepted. . . . 'I Gustave Jones had brought the request of the Hurley Rifles to disband to Little Rock, and M. L. Davis, the acting adjutant general, announced that Company F, Newport, and three other companies of the Second Regiment (Van Buren, Judsonia and Rector) had been disbanded at their own request. The officers and men were given honorable discharges, effective June 1, 1895. At the same time, Davis announced that he had accepted Col. Minor's resignation. effective July 1, 1895.

== Reorganization of 1897 ==
In January 1897 Governor Daniel W. Jones took office and appointed Brigadier General Arthur Neill as his Private Secretary and Acting Adjutant General (the position of Adjutant General had still not been re-authorized by the state legislature at this time). The new Governor and Adjutant General began a massive re-organization of the Arkansas State Guard. Two additional regiments of infantry, another troop of cavalry, and another battery of artillery were added to the organization. The state was divided into two military districts, with the Arkansas River being the dividing line. Major General Robert G. Shaver was commissioned and placed in overall command of the state's forces. Brigadier General C. R. Shaer was commissioned and placed in command of the Southern District, which included the 1st and 2nd Infantry Regiments, two batteries of artillery and a signal company. Major General V.Y. Cook was commissioned and placed in command of the Northern District, consisting of the 2nd and 4th Regiments of Infantry and a squadron of Cavalry. The units were poorly equipped and had outdated equipment.

=== Southern District, Brigadier General C.R. Schaer, Commanding ===
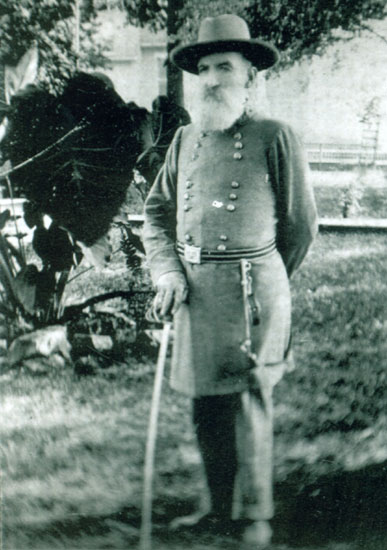
Major General Robert G. Shaver, Commander of the Arkansas State Guard, was a former Confederate officer who had commanded the 7th and 38th Arkansas Infantry Regiments during the American Civil War.

1st Regiment, Arkansas State Guard	Colonel F.B.T. Hollenberg,	Station
Company A,		Not yet formed
Company B,	Captain James Wood	Little Rock
Company C, (McCarthy Light Guards)	Captain C.M. Wright	Little Rock
Company D, (Fletcher Rifles)	Captain R.M. Pearson	Little Rock
Company E,	Captain Grant White	Hope
Company F,		Not yet formed
Company G,		Not yet formed
Company H,	Captain Edward Lucas	Star City
Company I,		Not yet formed
Company J,		Not yet formed
Company K,		Not yet formed
Company L	Captain R.W. Reynolds	Lake Village

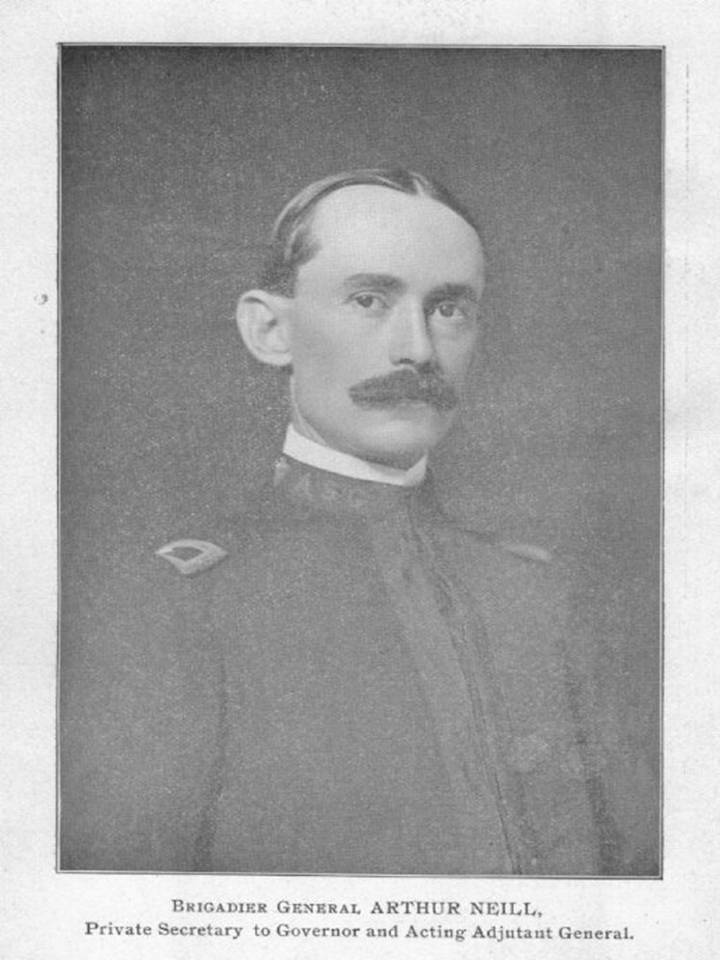
Brigadier General Arthur Neill, Arkansas State Guard, Private Secretary to Governor Daniel W. Jones and Acting Adjutant General.

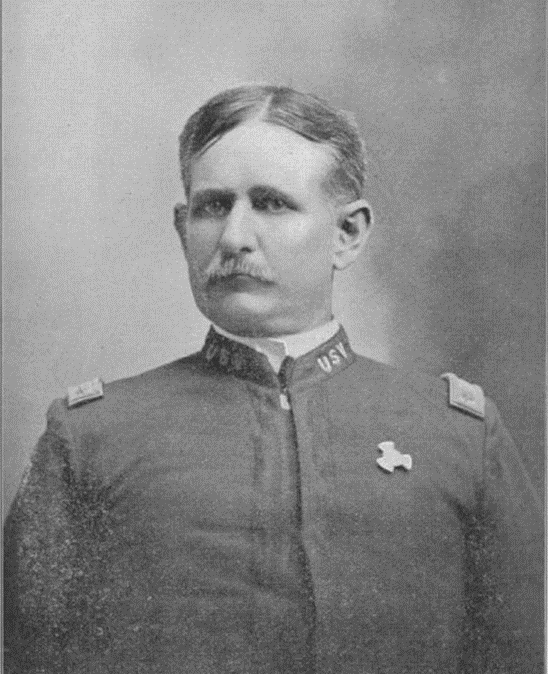
Brigadier General Clement R. Schaer, Commander of the Arkansas State Guard, Southern District, had served with the Arkansas State Guard since the Brooks-Baxter War. Later accepted a commission as Major, 1st Arkansas Volunteer Infantry.

3rd Regiment, Arkansas State Guard	Colonel J.F. Smith,	Station
Company A,	Captain W.E. Wooten	Hot Springs
Company B,	Captain D.P. Terry	Nashville
Company C,	Captain R.A. Gilliam	Lockesburg
Company D,	Captain C.F. Armistead	Fort Smith
Company E,	Captain E.K. Braley	
Company F,	Captain J.W. Coffman	Benton
Company G,	Captain Leo Krause	DeQueen
Company H,	Captain Wiley Wright	Prescott
Company I,	Captain Henry Stroup,	Paris
Company J,		Not yet formed
Company K,		Not yet formed
Company L		Not yet formed

Artillery Batteries

Unit	Commander	Station
Battery A	Lieutenant A.G. Crawford	Little Rock
Battery B	Captain C.E. Byers	Fort Smith

Unit	Commander	Station
Signal Corps	Captain J.F. Loughborough	Little Rock

=== Northern District, Major General V.Y. Cook, Commanding ===
2nd Regiment, Arkansas State Guard	Colonel J.B. Dent,	Station
Company A,	Captain S.L. Jeffers	Van Buren
Company B,		Not yet organized
Company C,	Captain B.T. Bullion	Conway
Company D,	Captain P.W. Mooss	Paragould
Company E,	Captain J.J. Cox	Marion
Company F,	Captain M.M. Stuckey	Newport
Company G,	Captain J.C. South	Mountain Home
Company H,	Captain J.E. Nichols,	Clarksville
Company I,	Captain M.D. Moody,	Judsonia
Company J,		Not yet organized
Company K,		Not yet organized
Company L	Captain R.W. Reynolds	Lake Village

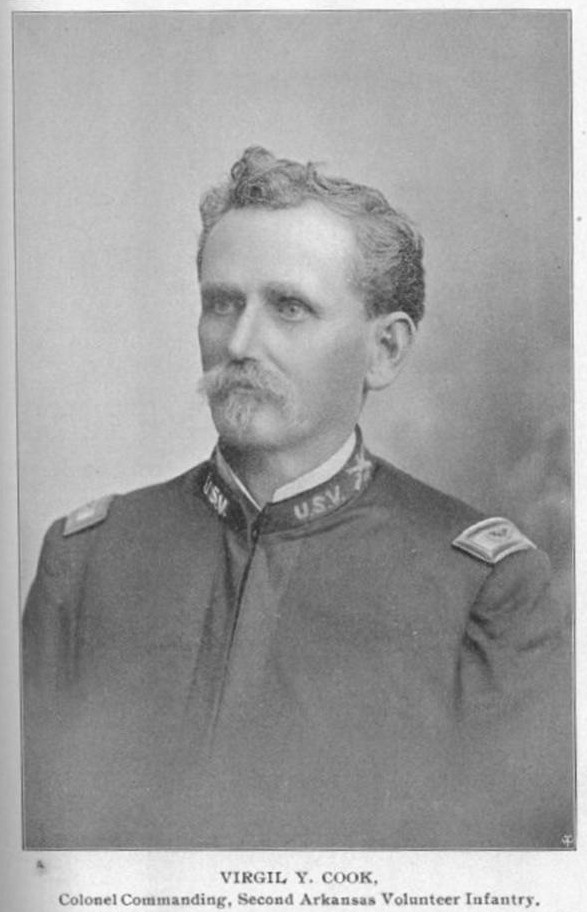
MG Virgil Y. Cook, later COL, Commander, 2nd Arkansas Volunteer Infantry, Spanish–American War.

4th Regiment, Arkansas State Guard	Colonel J.M. Phelps,	Station
Company A,	Captain R.H. Reed	Batesville
Company B,	Captain C.P. Sanders	Helena
Company C,	Captain J.R. Newman	Harrison
Company D,	Captain G. W. Granberry	Cabot
Company E,		Not yet organized
Company F,	Captain J.H. Yuckley	Stuttgart
Company G,	Captain W.J. Moss	Gillett
Company H,	Captain Mark Maxwell,	DeWitt
Company I,	Captain J.L. Long,	Springdale
Company J,		Not yet organized
Company K,	Captain Collier	Berryville
Company L		Not yet organized

1st Cavalry Squadron, Arkansas State Guard	Major M.C. House,	Station
Troop A,	First Lieutenant J.D. Adams	Panola
Troop B,	Captain S.W. Murtishaw	Jacksonville

== The Spanish–American War ==
On April 25, 1898, President William McKinley called upon the state to supply two infantry regiments for the Spanish–American War. None of the regiments were in condition to deploy and only two companies were judged fit to be mustered into service immediately. The 1st, 2nd, 3rd, and 4th Regiments of Infantry, Arkansas State Guard, were reorganized and were mustered into federal service between May 14–25, 1898 at Little Rock as the 1st and 2nd Arkansas Volunteer Infantry for service in the Spanish–American War. Governor Jones intended that all sections of the Arkansas be represented as much as possible, so the two new regiments were created from selected State Guard companies from different sections of the state. Pursuant to the Governor's direction the Regiments were organized as follows:

1st Arkansas Volunteer Infantry

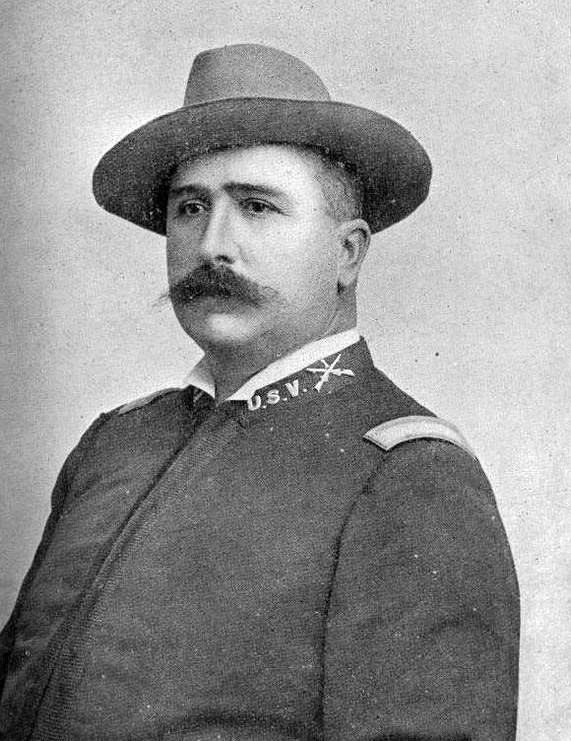
Colonel Elias Chandler, Commander, 1st Arkansas Volunteer Infantry

Company	Former Organization	Station
A	Company A, 3rd Regiment, Arkansas State Guard (ASG)	Hot Springs
B	Company, E, 3rd Regiment, ASG (Jefferson Fensibles)	Pine Bluff
C	Battery B, ASG	Fort Smith
D	Company D, 3rd Regiment, ASG	Fort Smith
E	Co E, 1st Regiment, ASG and Co G, 3rd Regiment, ASG	Hope (Co E) and DeQueen (CO G)
F	Company I, 4th Regiment, ASG	Springdale
G	Company B, 4th Regiment, ASG (Helena Light Guards)	Helena
H	New Unit Organized for the War	
I	Company A, 1st Regiment, ASG	Van Buren
K	Company I, 3rd Regiment, ASG	Paris
L	Company L, 1st Regiment, ASG, (Chicot Rifles)	Lake Village
M (Greene Rifles)	New company organized for the war	

2nd Arkansas Volunteer Infantry

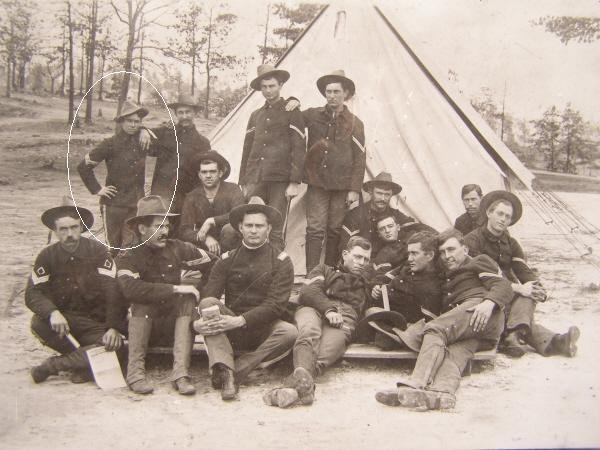
Members of the 2nd Arkansas Infantry Regiment posing in front of a tent

Company	Former Organization	Station
A	Company C, 1st Regiment, ASG (McCarthy Light Guards)	Little Rock
B	Company A, 4th Regiment, ASG, V.Y. Cook Rifles,	Batesville
C	Company G, 4th Regiment, ASG	Walnut Ridge
D	Company D, 2nd Regiment, ASG	?
E	Company D, 1st Regiment, ASG (Fletcher Rifles)	Little Rock
F	Company F, 2nd Regiment, ASG (Hurley Rifles)	?
G	Company D, 4th Regiment, ASG (Cabot Guards)	Cabot
H	Company I, 1st Regiment, ASG	Forrest City
I	Companies F, G, and H, 4th Regiment, ASG	Stuttgart (Co F), Gillett (Co G) and Dewitt (Co H)
K	Company A, 4th Regiment, ASG (Clendenin Rifles)	Harrison
L	Company C, 2nd Regiment, ASG	Conway
M	Company ?, 4th Regiment, ASG (Highland Sharpshooters)	Melbourne (with volunteers from Mountain Home)

The newly formed Arkansas Volunteer Infantry Regiments did not see combat during the Spanish–American War, due its brevity. In May 1898, the 1st Arkansas, commanded by Colonel Elias Chandler, along with the 2nd Arkansas, had moved to Camp George H. Thomas at Chickamauga Park, Georgia. Both regiments were still undergoing training there when the war effectively ended with the fall of Cuba and the signing of an armistice in early August. The 1st Arkansas Volunteer Infantry mustered out of federal service on October 25, 1899, at Little Rock, Arkansas. However, the 2nd Regiment continued in service until February 25, 1899, when the men were finally mustered out at Anniston, Alabama. Even though the regiments saw no fighting, their deployment was not without fatalities. Fifty-four Arkansas Soldiers died of disease or in accidents during their mobilization.

== Flags of the First Arkansas Infantry ==
Three flags have survived that were made for the first Arkansas with the intent to use them for the war. Due to the conflict ending too quickly for the first Arkansas be involved in any fighting, the flags were never used in combat. The flags are currently in the possession of the Old State House Museum.

National Color of the First Arkansas Infantry	Regimental Flag of the First Arkansas Infantry	Flag that was presumably presented to the First Arkansas Infantry before departing for Georgia

== Relevance to current Arkansas National Guard ==
While the Arkansas State Guard did not win any additional campaign participation credit for its mobilization as a part of the Spanish–American War, the reorganization the occurred as a result of the war laid the ground work for the modern Arkansas National Guard. The 153rd Infantry Regiment and the 142nd Field Artillery Regiment each trace their lineage and honors to the units in existence just prior to and during the Spanish–American War. The nation's experience with a large scale mobilization of the state militias would result in new legislation that changed the nation's national defense strategy. The realization that the system of state funded and organized militia units had failed to provide the nation with a rapidly deployable army at a time when the United States was becoming an international power led to legislative provisions focused upon establishing a more reliable, standardized and federally funded reserve component. These provisions were enshrined in the Militia Act of 1903, which established the National Guard.

== Significant state missions ==
In 1894 the Arkansas State Guard was activated during a railroad strike. The ASG at this time was not funded by the legislature, but the legislature reimbursed the ASG for its expenses during the 1896 General Assembly.

During an outbreak of "Yellow Fever" from August through October 1905 the Arkansas State Guard was activated to enforce a quarantine. The ASG guarded the borders of the state "just as in time of war" and established relief camps.
