= Arkansas Wing Civil Air Patrol =

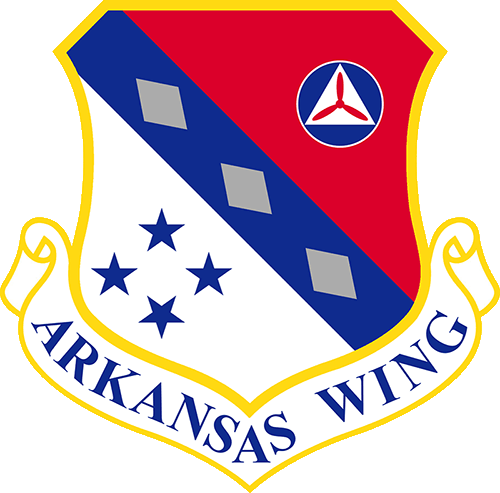
- Arkansas Wing of Civil Air Patrol

Associated branches
- United States Air Force

Command staff
- Commander: Col Charles Rine
- Deputy Commander: Lt Col Larry Webster
- Chief of Staff: Lt Col Jerome D. Grotts

Current statistics
- Cadets: 245
- Seniors: 256
- Total Membership: 501
- Awards: Unit Citation Award (1983); Unit Citation Award (1994); Unit Citation Award (2004); Unit Citation Award (2020)
- Website: arwg.cap.gov
- Statistics as of 05/2026

Arkansas Wing of Civil Air Patrol (CAP) is the highest echelon of Civil Air Patrol in the state of Arkansas. Arkansas Wing headquarters are located in Little Rock, Arkansas. Arkansas Wing consists of over 400 cadet and adult members at over 13 locations across the state of Arkansas.

== Mission ==
Civil Air Patrol has three primary missions: providing emergency services; offering cadet programs for youth; and providing aerospace education for CAP members and the general public.

=== Emergency services ===
Civil Air Patrol provides emergency services, includes performing search and rescue and disaster relief missions; it also assists in humanitarian aid missions. It provides Air Force support through conducting light transport, communications support, and low-altitude route surveys. Civil Air Patrol may offer support to counter-drug missions.

=== Cadet programs ===
Civil Air Patrol runs a cadet program for youth aged 12 to 21, which includes aerospace education, leadership training, physical fitness and moral leadership.

=== Aerospace education ===
Civil Air Patrol offers aerospace education for both CAP members and the general public; this includes providing training to the members of CAP, and offering workshops for youth throughout the nation through schools and public aviation events.

== Organization ==
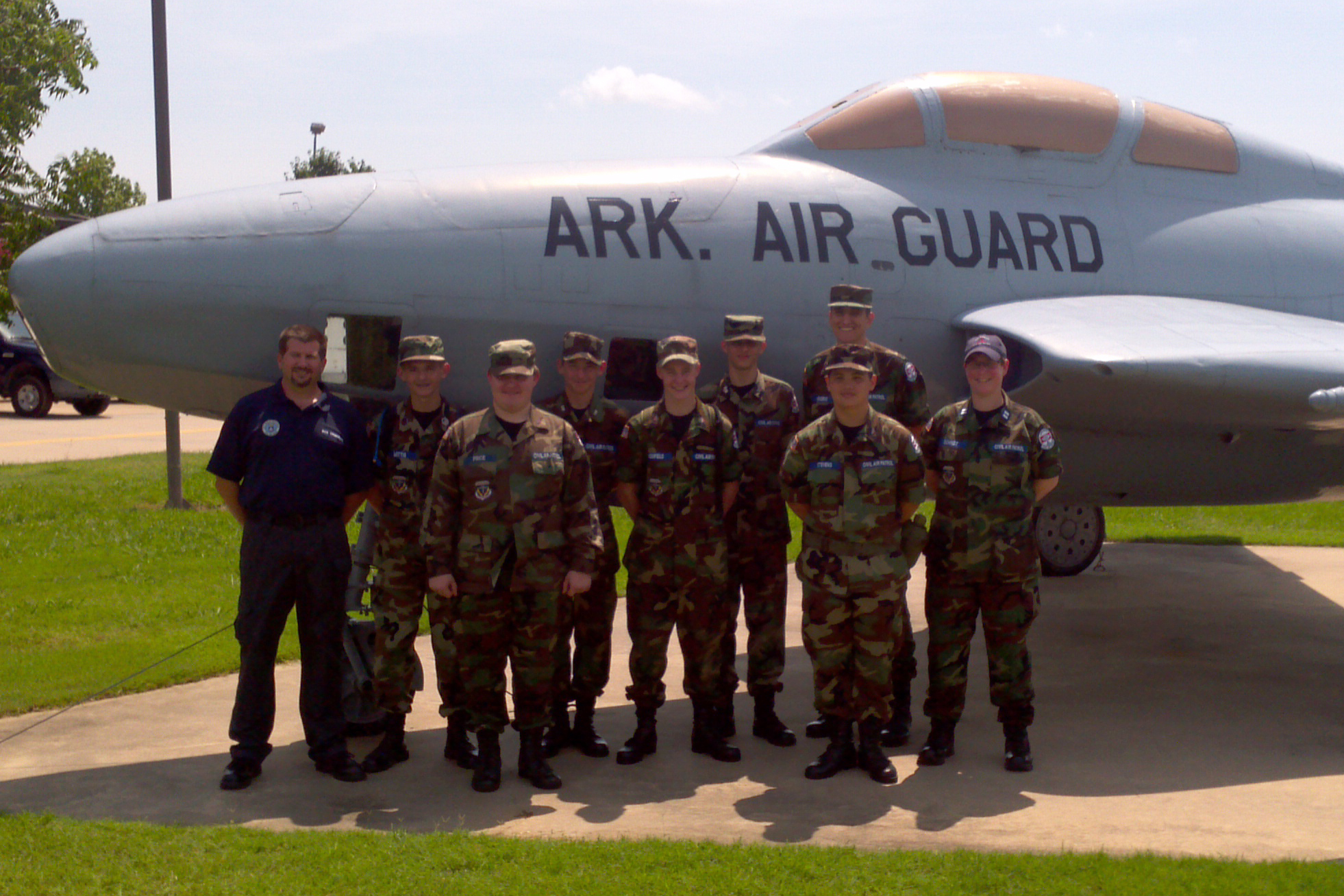
Members of the Civil Air Patrol’s 83rd Composite Squadron based in Fort Smith, Ark., pose for a photo in front of a 188th Fighter Wing RF-84 Thunderflash.

Units within the Arkansas Wing
Designation	Unit Name	Location
SWR-AR-040	40th Composite Squadron	Hot Springs
SWR-AR-042	42nd Composite Squadron	Little Rock
SWR-AR-067	67th Composite Flight	Monticello
SWR-AR-083	83rd Composite Squadron	Fort Smith
SWR-AR-094	94th Composite Squadron	Conway
SWR-AR-095	95th Composite Squadron	Texarkana
SWR-AR-099	99th Composite Squadron	West Memphis
SWR-AR-102	102nd Composite Squadron	Russellville
SWR-AR-107	107th Composite Squadron	Mountain Home
SWR-AR-115	115th Composite Squadron	Rogers
SWR-AR-120	120th Composite Squadron	Jonesboro
SWR-AR-801	801st Cadet Squadron	Little Rock

== See also ==
- Arkansas Air National Guard
- Arkansas State Guard
- Awards and decorations of the Civil Air Patrol
