= Elias Chandler =

American major (1856–1909)

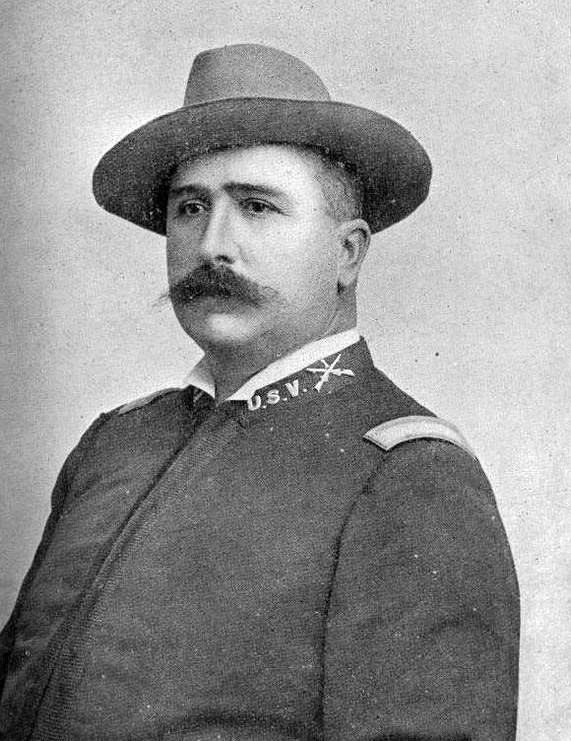
- Chandler in 1898
- Born: December 29, 1856; Adair, Illinois, U.S.
- Died: September 14, 1909 (aged 52); Fort Oglethorpe, Georgia, U.S.
- Burial place: Evergeen Cemetery, Fayetteville, Arkansas, U.S.
- Education: United States Military Academy
- Military career
- Allegiance: United States
- Branch: United States Army
- Service years: 1876–1909
- Rank: Colonel (Volunteers); Major (Regular Army)
- Commands: 1st Arkansas Volunteer Infantry Regiment
- Conflicts: Spanish–American War; Philippine–American War

Elias Chandler was an American Colonel of the Spanish–American War and the Philippine–American War. He was known for commanding the 1st Arkansas Volunteer Infantry Regiment and oversaw its training before the war concluded.

== Service in the Frontier ==
Chandler was born on December 29, 1856, at Adair, Illinois. He entered as a cadet at the United States Military Academy from June 14, 1876, to June 12, 1880, when he graduated as a Second Lieutenant of the 16th Infantry Regiment. He first served at Fort Wallace from Sep 29 to December 2, 1880, Fort Stockton until January 1881, Fort Davis until March 14, 1881, Fort McKavett until May 1881, San Antonio until December 9, 1881, and Fort McKavett until December 29, 1991. Chandler then took command of Fort Griffin and oversaw the activities of the Tonkawa until November 10, 1884, when he returned to San Antonio until March 10, 1885.

He was promoted to First Lieutenant on April 14, 1887, before being sent to Fort McIntosh until July 1, 1888. He was then transferred to Fort Douglas from 1890 to September 1892. During this time, he was sent to Pine Ridge, South Dakota in January 1891 to participate in the Ghost Dance War. He was then on a recruiting service at Fort Slocum from October 1, 1892, to February 14, 1894. He then became a professor of Military Science and Tactics at the University of Arkansas from February 28, 1894, to February 28, 1898, as he returned to the 16th Infantry Regiment at Fort Sherman on April 4, 1898, before transferred to Chickamauga, Georgia on April 21.

== Spanish-American War ==
Upon the outbreak of the Spanish–American War, Daniel Webster Jones called for the organizations of volunteers within Arkansas and Chandler volunteered to serve as the Colonel of the 1st Arkansas Volunteer Infantry Regiment on May 18, 1898, with a tenure of 2 years. He also commanded the 1st Brigade of the 2nd Division of the Third Army Corps from May 27 to July 9, and from July 21 to September 9, 1898, at Chickamauga before being honorably discharged on from volunteer service on October 25, 1898.

== Service in the Philippines ==
He joined the 1st Infantry Regiment as a Captain on December 3, 1898, at Huntsville, Alabama and commanded a battalion from December 3, 1898, to January 27, 1899, and was within Pinar del Rio from December 26, 1898, to January 2, 1899, and at the camp there from January 2 to 27, 1899. He also served as the Collector of Customs at Sagua la Grande, from January 31, 1899, to January 1901. He was then sent back to Arkansas within the Fort Logan H. Roots February 1 to April 9, 1901. He then traveled to the Philippines during the Philippine–American War from April 9, 1901, to April 4, 1903. He was also promoted to Major of the 24th Infantry Regiment on August 9, 1903. He also served as the Chief Quartermaster at West Point, Kentucky from August 13, 1903, to March 1, 1904. He then served at Fort William Henry Harrison and Assinniboine, Montana from June 15, 1904, to December 24, 1905. He briefly served as the Inspector-General on July 20, 1905, but returned to the Philippines from December 24, 1905, to July 5, 1906. Chandler briefly retired on June 30, 1906, at his own request. He then returned on October 6, 1906, and served at recruiting duty at Chattanooga, Tennessee from January 13, 1907, but died on September 14, 1909, at Fort Oglethorpe. He was then buried at the Evergreen Cemetery, Fayetteville, Arkansas.
