= Militia Act of 1903 =

United States law establishing the National Guard

- Other short titles: Efficiency in Militia Act of 1903 · Dick Act
- Long title: An Act To promote the efficiency of the militia, and for other purposes.
- Nicknames: The Dick Act
- Enacted by: the 57th United States Congress
- Effective: January 21, 1903

Citations
- Public law: Public Law 57-33
- Statutes at Large: 32 Stat. 775

Codification
- Acts repealed: Militia Acts of 1792

Legislative history
- Introduced in the House as H.R. 11654 by R‑OH Charles W. F. Dickth on February 21, 1902; Committee consideration by House Committee on Militia; Passed the House on June 30, 1902 (Voice vote); Passed the Senate on January 14, 1903 (Voice vote); Signed into law by President Theodore Roosevelt on January 21, 1903

Major amendments
- Militia Act of 1908

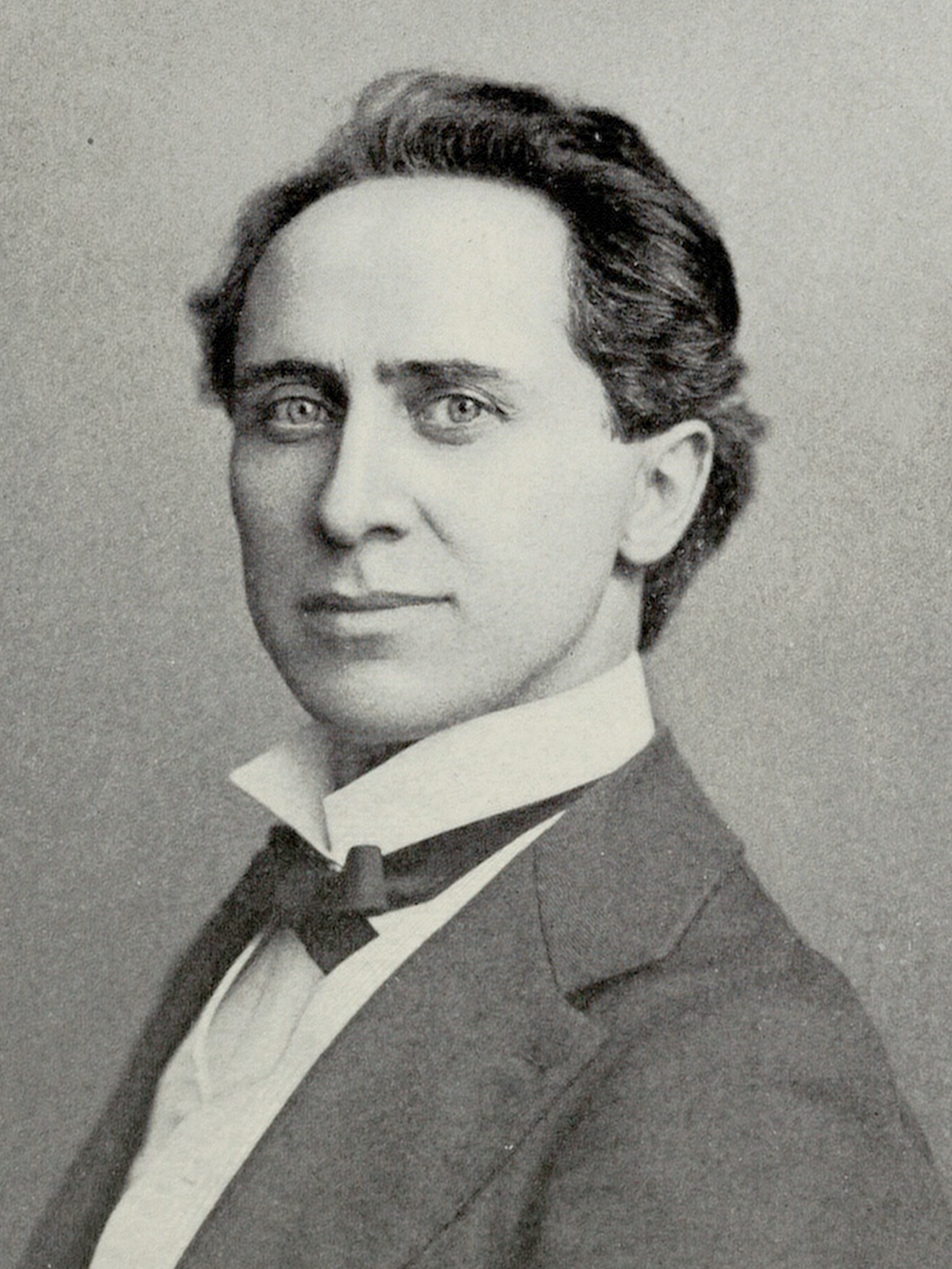
Charles Dick, for whom the Militia Act of 1903 was named.

The Militia Act of 1903 (32 Stat. 775), also known as the Efficiency in Militia Act of 1903 or the Dick Act, was legislation enacted by the United States Congress to create what would become the modern National Guard from a subset of the militia, and codify the circumstances under which the Guard could be federalized. It also provided federal funds to pay for equipment and training, including annual summer encampments. The new National Guard was to organize units of similar form and quality to those of the regular Army, and intended to achieve the same training, education, and readiness requirements as active duty units.

== Prior history ==
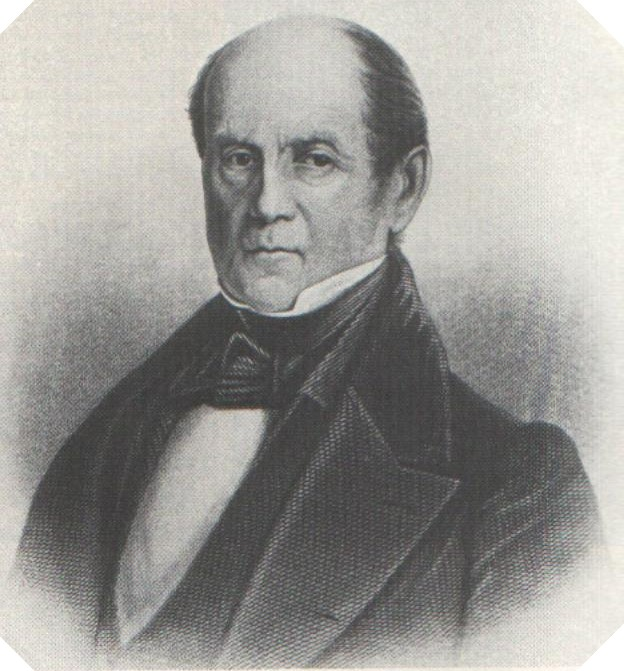
Governor Martin Chittenden unsuccessfully attempted to recall Vermont Militia from New York during the War of 1812.

During the 19th century, the militia in each U.S. state and territory operated under the Militia Acts of 1792, which was extended by the Militia Act of 1795. The 1792 and 1795 acts left the question of state versus federal control of the militia unresolved. In consequence, the federal government could not consistently rely on the militias for national defense. For example, during the War of 1812, members of the New York militia refused to take part in operations against the British in Canada, arguing that their only responsibility was to defend their home state. On another occasion, the Governor of Vermont unsuccessfully attempted to recall his state's militia from the defense of Plattsburgh, claiming that it was illegal for them to operate outside of Vermont.

As a result, starting in 1812, the federal government would create "volunteer" units when it needed to expand the size of the regular Army. These volunteer units were not militia (though often they would consist of individual militia members or whole militia units which had volunteered en masse), nor were they part of the regular Army. This solution was also employed during the Mexican–American War (1846–1848), and in the Union Army during the American Civil War (1861–1865).

During the Spanish–American War (1898) some volunteer units were organized, most notably the 1st United States Volunteer Cavalry Regiment, nicknamed "Rough Riders." The federal government also mobilized several National Guard units which volunteered en masse under the provisions of the volunteer law, and were accepted as volunteer units.

== Root reforms and Dick Act ==
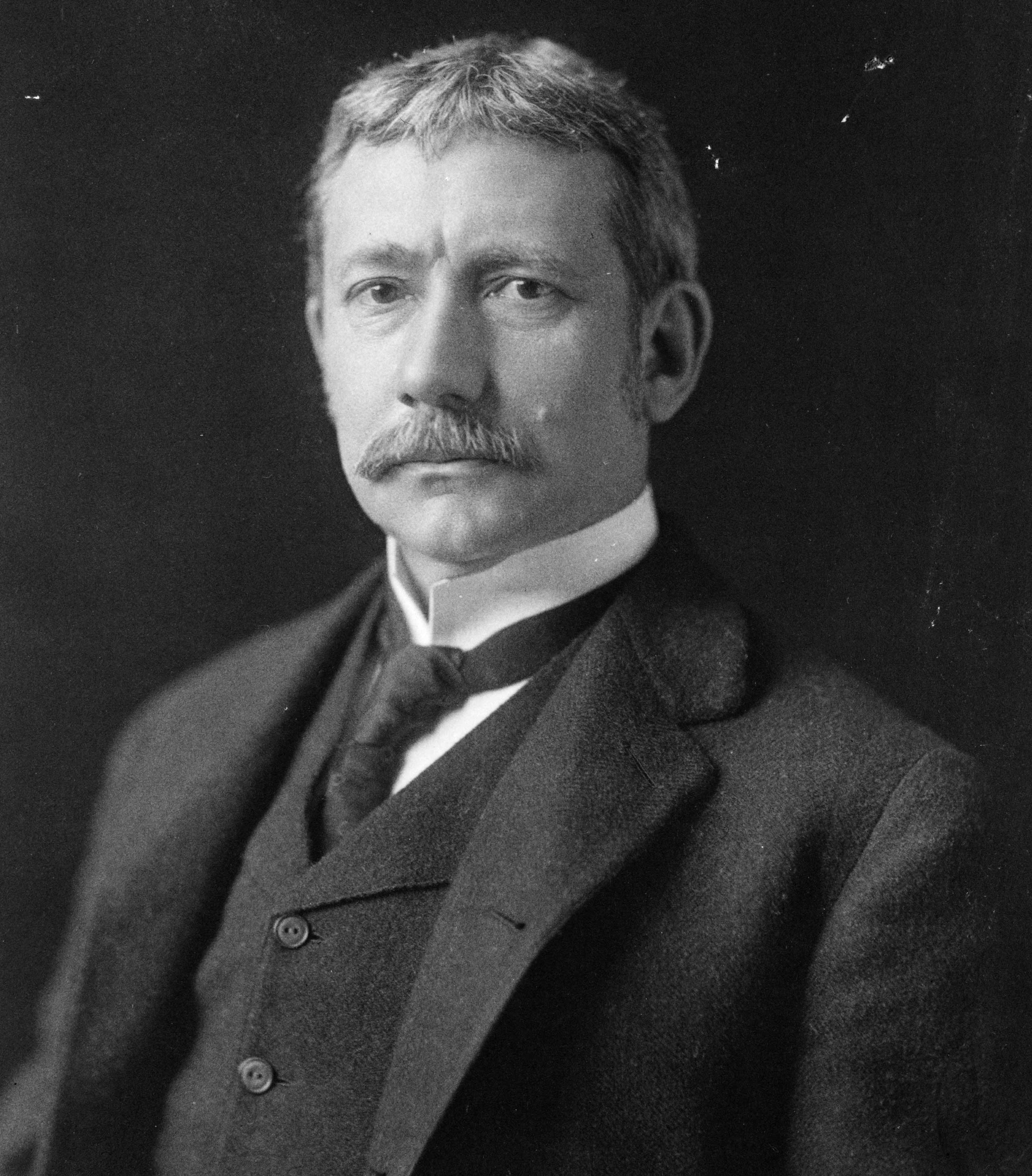
Secretary of War Elihu Root worked to reform Army after Spanish–American War.

Several problems were identified with the National Guard during the Spanish–American War, such as units suffering from low levels of training and readiness and a lack of standardization in organizational structure, uniforms, equipment, leader qualifications and professional development. The Secretary of War Elihu Root and other military leaders took steps to reform the Army, including the National Guard. Root's allies included Charles Dick, Congressman (later Senator) from Ohio and Chairman of the House Militia Affairs Committee, who also served as president of the National Guard Association of the United States. Dick was a veteran of the Spanish–American War and a longtime National Guard member who attained the rank of major general as commander of the Ohio National Guard.

Dick championed the Militia Act of 1903, which became known as the Dick Act. The 1903 act repealed the Militia Acts of 1795 and designated the militia (per Title 10 of the U.S. Code, Section 311) as two classes: the Reserve Militia, which included all able-bodied men between ages 17 and 45, and the Organized Militia, comprising state militia (National Guard) units receiving federal support.

The Dick Act included $2 million (equivalent to $71,666,700 in 2025) for National Guard units to modernize equipment, and permitted states to use federal funds to pay for National Guard summer training encampments. The National Guard in each state was also required to carry out a uniform schedule of weekend or weeknight drills and annual summer training camps. In addition, the War Department agreed to fund the attendance of Guard officers at Army schools, and active Army officers would serve as inspectors and instructors of National Guard units. The War Department also agreed to organize joint Regular Army-National Guard exercises and training encampments.

In return, the federal government gained greater control over the National Guard. The President of the United States was empowered to call up the National Guard for up to nine months to repel invasion, suppress rebellion, or enforce federal laws. Guardsmen had to answer a presidential call or face court-martial. States had to organize, equip, and train their units in accordance with the policies and procedures of the Regular Army. If Guard units failed to meet Army standards, they would lose federal recognition and federal funding.

The Dick Act helped resolve the issue of when the United States government could mobilize the National Guard, but federal authorities were not permitted to order the National Guard to service outside the United States.

== Amendments ==
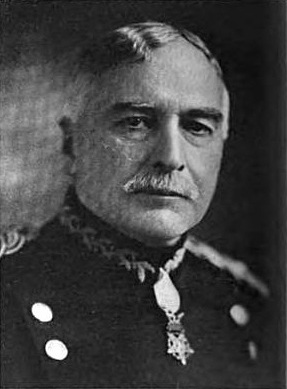
James Parker, first head of Division of Militia Affairs.

The Dick Act was amended several times. The Militia Act of 1908 removed the nine-month limit on federal service, giving the President the authority to set the length of federal service. The ban on National Guard units serving outside the United States was also dropped, though subsequently the United States Attorney General offered his opinion that ordering the National Guard to serve outside the United States was unconstitutional. In addition, the 1908 law stated that during a mobilization the National Guard had to be federalized before the Army could organize volunteer units. The 1908 law also included the creation of the Division of Militia Affairs as the Army agency responsible for overseeing federal training and administrative requirements for the National Guard.

The National Defense Act of 1916, as part of the mobilization prior to U.S. entry into World War I, increased the number of required drill periods from 24 to 48 and the length of summer training camps from five days to 15. The War Department was authorized to centrally plan for the National Guard's authorized strength, and the number and types of National Guard units in each state, and empowered it to implement uniform enlistment contracts and officer commissioning requirements for the National Guard. Guardsmen were required to take both state and federal enlistment oaths or oaths of office. The law replaced the federal subsidy with an annual budget to cover most Guard expenses, including drill pay. The Division of Militia Affairs was expanded to form the Militia Bureau (now National Guard Bureau). The 1916 law resolved the issues of deploying National Guardsmen overseas by stipulating that they would be discharged as members of the militia and then drafted into federal service, thus removing the National Guard from its status as the militia of the states when operating under federal authority. This provision was employed to call up the National Guard during the Pancho Villa Expedition, and again during World War I.

Other amendments were the National Defense Act of 1920, and the National Defense Act Amendments of 1933. The 1933 Act amended the National Defense Act of 1916 to create a separate reserve component of the United States Army called the National Guard of the United States. Since then, all National Guardsmen have been members of both their State National Guard and the National Guard of the United States.

== Implementation ==
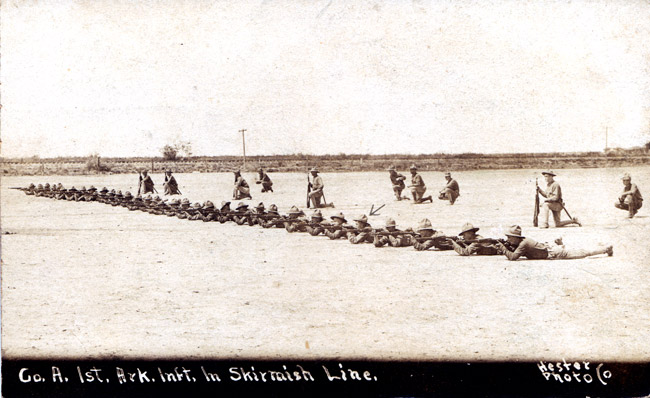
Company A, 1st Arkansas Infantry, near Deming, New Mexico, during Pancho Villa Expedition.

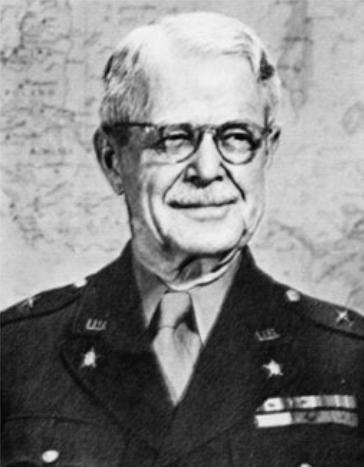
John M. Palmer, advocate of National Guard following World War I.

The improvements to National Guard training and readiness and the resolution of the circumstances under which the National Guard could be federalized led to the call up of National Guard units for service on the Mexico–United States border during the Pancho Villa Expedition.

In addition, National Guard units were federalized and deployed overseas during World War I.

The improvements to the Army–National Guard relationship, the improvements to National Guard training and readiness, and the National Guard's successful service during the Villa Expedition and the First World War brought about by the Dick Act and subsequent amendments enabled John McAuley Palmer and other National Guard advocates to defeat a 1920 effort to completely replace the National Guard with a federal-only reserve force.

== In fiction ==
The Militia Act of 1903 is referenced in Jack London's 1908 novel The Iron Heel as "rushed through Congress and the Senate secretly, with practically no discussion" and as introducing the draft for American citizens: "If you refused to go into the militia, or to obey after you were in, you would be tried by drumhead court martial and shot down like dogs."

== See also ==
- Militia Acts of 1792
- Military Peace Establishment Act
