= Military Peace Establishment Act =

United States law

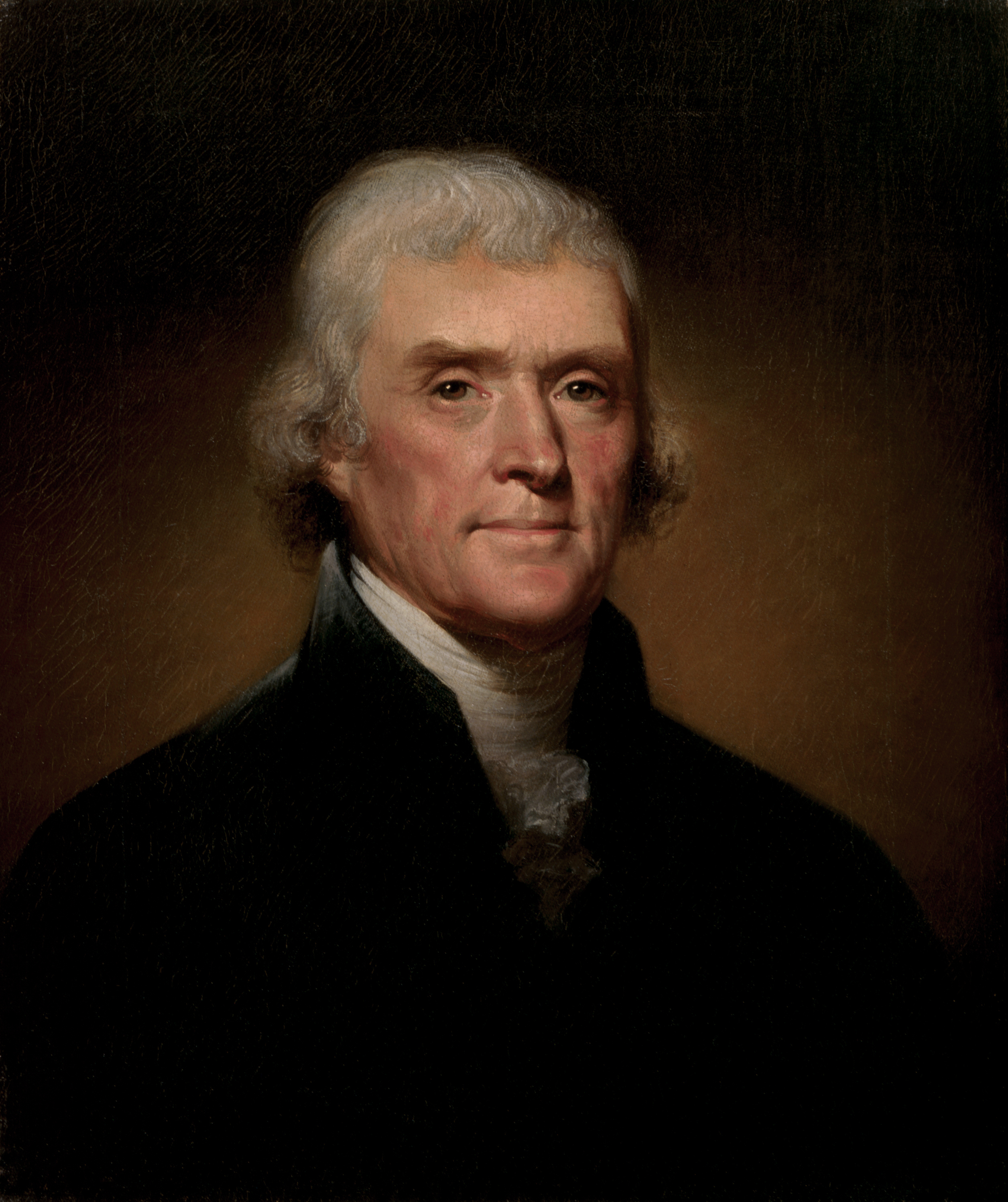
Portrait of Thomas Jefferson by Rembrandt Peale, c. 1800

The Military Peace Establishment Act documented and advanced a new set of laws and limits for the U.S. military. It was approved by Congress and signed on March 16, 1802, by President Thomas Jefferson, who was fundamental in its drafting and proposal. The Act outlined in 29 sections the rules, the number of officers and military personnel and the management of provisions that would be granted to the military overall. The Act also directed that a corps of engineers be established and "stationed at West Point in the state of New York, and shall constitute a Military Academy" whose primary function was to train expert engineers loyal to the United States and alleviate the need to employ them from foreign countries. Jefferson also advanced the Act with political objectives in mind.

== History ==
Upon assuming the presidency in 1801 President Jefferson believed that the military was too large and noted that it was dominated by members of the Federalist Party and lacked its own corps of engineers. He felt that the military overall should be reduced in size and that it needed to recruit and train its own engineers who would be stationed at a military academy. Calls for a military academy were first entertained by George Washington, Thomas Jefferson, Alexander Hamilton and others during the American Revolution. At that time Jefferson disagreed with Hamilton's belief that such a military academy should be under the management of the federal government. As President, however, Jefferson abandoned the constitutional reservations he had held against federal control of a national military academy.

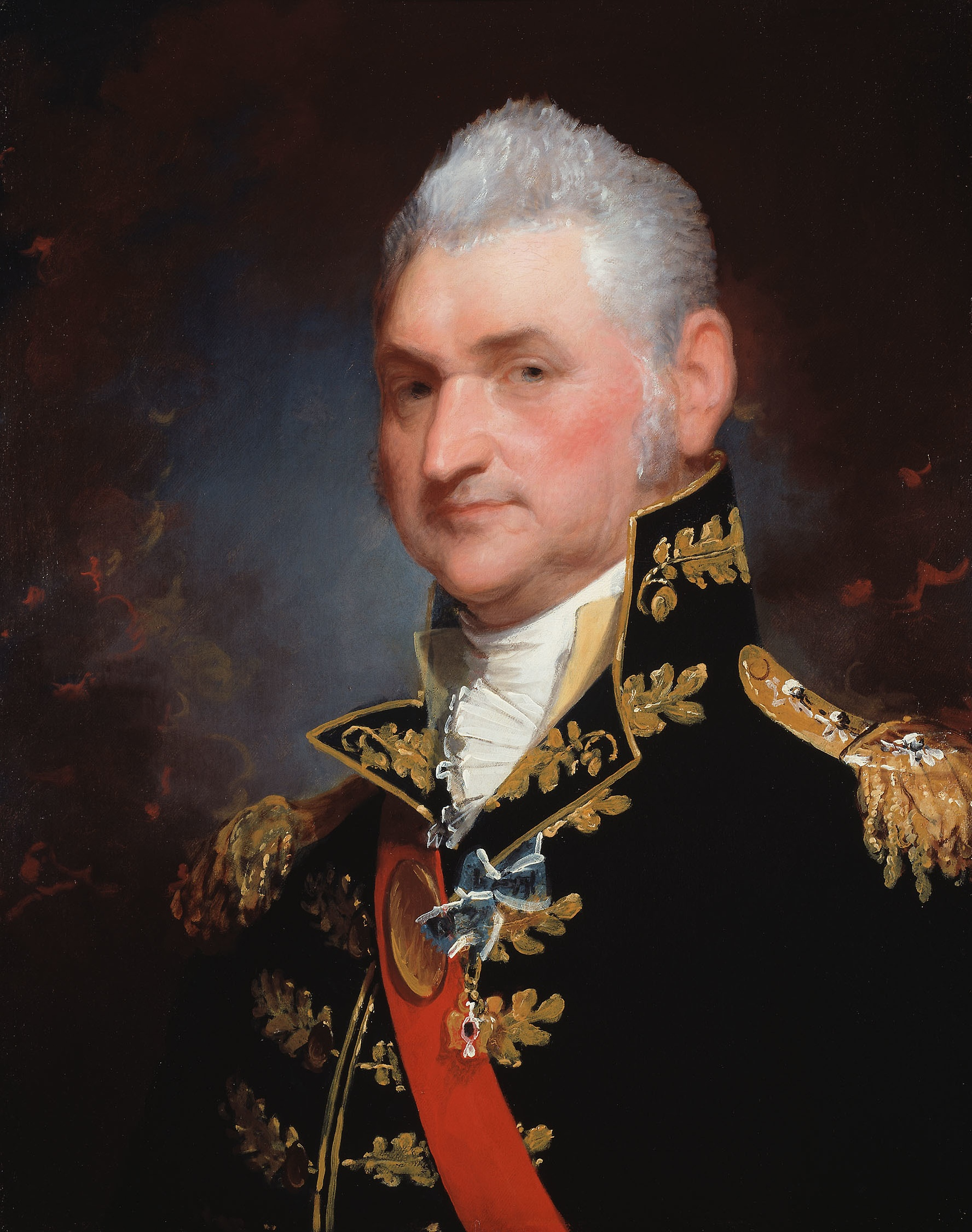
Henry Dearborn As Secretary of War under Jefferson, Dearborn advised him in the drafting of the Military Peace Establishment Act.

Jefferson had always felt that the "useful sciences" were important in education and in the protection of the young nation. In December 1800, while he was formulating his ideas for the military, Jefferson agreed to Secretary of War Henry Dearborn's proposal to have only one regiment of artillerists and two regiments of infantry. (Note: Jefferson and Dearborn exchanged several letters during this time of military reformation. Dearborn also advised and assisted Jefferson in planning the Lewis and Clark Expedition.) Jefferson also consulted Pierre Samuel du Pont de Nemours in a letter asking, "what are the branches of science which in the present state of man, and particularly with us, should be introduced into an academy?" du Pont responded with a proposal of an all-inclusive plan of national education with primary schools, colleges, and four specialty schools – medicine, mines, social science and legislation – and "higher geometry and the sciences that it explains." With emphasis on the importance of math and the sciences both Jefferson and du Pont maintained that the academy would be of great benefit to the nation. du Pont in his letter to Jefferson proclaimed : "No nation is in such need of canals as the United States, and most of their ports have no means of exterior defense."

Two months after Jefferson's inauguration, Dearborn announced that the president had "decided on the immediate establishment of a military school at West Point" and also on the appointment of chief engineer Major Jonathan Williams, grandnephew of Benjamin Franklin, to the position of superintendent, and "to direct the necessary arrangements for the commencement of the school." Superintendent Williams said "Our leading star is not a little mathematical school, but a great national establishment... We must always bear it in mind that our officers are to be men of science, and such as will by their acquirements be entitled to the notice of learned societies." On March 1, 1802, Congress authorized President Jefferson to organize a corps of engineers. After Jefferson signed the Military Peace Establishment Act on March 16, the United States Military Academy at West Point was soon established on the Hudson River in New York. On July 4, 1802, the U.S. Military Academy formally opened for instruction.

At first it appeared that Jefferson's Military Peace Establishment Act was calling for a reduction in the army's authorized strength, but the Act resulted in the removal of few enlisted men. Jefferson and Dearborn instead began to relieve some of the most visible and partisan Federalists that were commissioned under John Adams' presidency. Jefferson had inherited from the Adams administration a force fielded of four infantry regiments and two regiments of engineers and artillery, with 5,438 officers and men. From June 1, 1802, the newly organized army would comprise only two regiments of infantry, a single artillery regiment, and a tiny Corps of Engineers. Jefferson's Act cut the officer's corps by roughly one third, to a modest total of 3,289. Jefferson had wanted to do away with the standing army and the navy altogether, but in the face of repeated Federalist warnings he acquiesced by making only marginal reductions. He ordered Treasury Secretary, Albert Gallatin to spend no more than $2 million annually, divided equally between the army and the navy. Republican congressmen maintained that a substantial savings would be achieved as a result from the reorganization. The Military Peace Establishment Act also provided for the creation of military agencies, which were to replace the quartermaster's department. On April 27 Jefferson nominated three candidates with a background of notable service and who were promptly approved by the Senate on the 29th. The agents would be responsible for procuring and managing military stores, hospital supplies for the army, and goods for Indian annuities. At each post an army officer would function as an assistant military agent.

Jefferson also had political goals in mind with his proposed Act, wanting to add more members of the military who embraced Republican values. His intentions for the Act was not simply to reduce the military in size but to rid the Army of "detractors" and those with questionable loyalties. He intended also to bring reform to the Executive branch, replacing Federalists who at the time dominated the officer corps. Jefferson was concerned that the military was becoming an elitist organization that was assuming the same mindset found in members of the Society of the Cincinnati (Note: The founding of this society was criticized by Jefferson, Benjamin Franklin, Judge Aedanus Burke, and others as an attempt to establish a hereditary membership over the common domain.) from the Revolutionary War era, and that the Military Peace Establishment Act would keep this tendency in check. With the military reduced to a few regiments, Jefferson maintained that much of the duty and responsibility of national security should be shouldered by the various state militias.

== Text of the Military Peace Establishment Act ==
Military Peace Establishment Act

Statute I, March 16, 1802.

An Act fixing the military peace establishment of the United States.

Be it enacted by the Senate and House of Representatives of the United States of America in Congress assembled, That the military peace establishment of the United States from and after the first of June next, shall be composed of one Regiment of artillerists and two regiments of infantry, with such officers, military agents, and engineers, as are herein after mentioned.

Sec. 2. And be it further enacted. That the regiment of artillerists shall consist of one colonel, one lieutenant-colonel, four majors, one adjutant, and twenty companies, each company to consist of one captain, one first lieutenant, one second lieutenant, two cadets, four sergeants, four corporals, four musicians, eight artificers, and fifty-six privates; to be formed into five battalions: Provided always, that it shall be lawful for the President of the United States to retain, with their present grade, as many of the first lieutenants, now in service, as shall amount to the whole number of lieutenants required; but that in proportion as vacancies happen therein, new appointments be made to the grade of second lieutenants until their number amount to twenty : and each regiment of infantry shall consist of one colonel, one lieutenant-colonel, one major, one adjutant, one sergeant-major, two teachers of music, and ten companies; each company to consist of one captain, one first and one second lieutenant, one ensign, four sergeants, four corporals, four musicians, and sixty-four privates.

Sec. 3. And be it further enacted, That there shall be one brigadier-general, with one aid-de-camp, who shall be taken from the captains or subalterns of the line; one adjutant and inspector of the army, to be taken from the line of field officers; one paymaster of the army, seven paymasters and- two assistants, to be attached to such districts as the President of the United States shall direct, to be taken from the line of commissioned officers, who, in addition to their other duties, shall have charge of the clothing of the troops; three military agents, and such number of assistant military agents as the President of the United States shall deem expedient, not exceeding one to each military post; which assistants shall be taken from the line; two surgeons; twenty-five surgeons' mates, to be attached to garrisons or posts, and not to corps.

Sec. 4. And be it further enacted. That the monthly pay of the officers, non-commissioned officers, musicians, and privates, be as follows, to wit : to the brigadier-general, two hundred and twenty-five dollars, which shall be his full and entire compensation, without a right to demand or receive any rations, forage, travelling expenses, or other perquisite or emolument whatsoever, except such stationery as may be requisite for the use of his department; to the adjutant and inspector of the army, thirty-eight dollars in addition to his pay in the line, and such stationery as shaft be requisite for his department; to the paymaster of the army, one hundred and twenty dollars, without any other emolument, except such stationery as may be requisite in his department and the use of the public office now occupied by him; to the aid-de-camp, in addition to his pay in the line, thirty dollars; to each paymaster attached to districts, thirty dollars, and each assistant to such paymaster, ten dollars, in addition to his pay in the line; to each military agent, seventy-six dollars and no other emolument; to each assistant military agent, eight dollars, in addition to his pay in the line, except the assistant military agents at Pittsburg and Niagara, who shall receive sixteen dollars, each, in addition to their pay in the line; to each colonel, seventy-five dollars; to each lieutenant-colonel, sixty dollars; to each major, fifty dollars; to each surgeon, forty-five dollars; to each surgeon's mate, thirty dollars; to each adjutant, ten dollars, in addition to his pay in the line; to each captain, forty dollars; to each first lieutenant, thirty dollars; to each second lieutenant, twenty-five dollars; to each ensign, twenty dollars; to each cadet, ten dollars; to each sergeant-major, nine dollars; to each sergeant, eight dollars; to each corporal, seven dollars; to each teacher of music, eight dollars; to each musician, six dollars; to each artificer, ten dollars; and to each private, five dollars.

Sec. 5. And be it farther enacted, That the commissioned officers aforesaid, shall be entitled to receive, for their daily subsistence, the following number of rations of provisions : a colonel, six rations; a lieutenant-colonel, five rations; a major, four rations; a captain, three rations; a lieutenant, two rations; an ensign, two rations; a surgeon, three rations; a surgeon's mate, two rations; a cadet, two rations or money in lieu thereof at the option of the said officers and cadets at the posts respectively, where the rations shall become due; and if at such post supplies are not furnished by contract, then such allowance as shall be deemed equitable, having reference to former contracts, and the posi-tion of the place in question : and each non-commissioned officer, musician and private, one ration; to the commanding officers of each separate post, such additional number of rations as the President of the United States shall, from time to time, direct, having respect to the special circumstances of each post; to the women who may be allowed to any particular corps not exceeding the proportion of four to a company, one ration each; to such matrons and nurses as may be necessarily employed in the hospital, one ration each; and to. every commissioned officer who shall keep one servant, not a soldier of the line, one additional ration.

Sec. 6. And be it further enacted, That each ration shall consist of one pound and a quarter of beef, or three quarters of a pound of pork, eighteen ounces of bread or flour, one gill of rum, whiskey or brandy, and at the rate of two quarts of salt, four quarts of vinegar, four pounds of soap, and one pound and a half of candles to every hundred rations.

Sec. 7. And be it further enacted, That the following officers shall, whenever forage is not furnished by the public, receive at the rate of the following sums per month, in lieu thereof: each colonel, twelve dollars; each lieutenant-colonel, eleven dollars; each major, ten dollars; each adjutant, six dollars; each surgeon, ten dollars; and each surgeon's mate, six dollars.

Sec. 8. And be it further enacted, That every non-commissioned officer, musician arid private of the artillery and infantry, shall receive annually, the following articles of uniform clothing, to wit : one hat, one coat, one vest, two pair of woollen and two pair of linen overalls, one coarse linen frock and trowsers for fatigue clothing, four pair of shoes, four shirts, two pair of socks, two pair of short stockings, one blanket, one stock and clasp, and one pair of half gaithers : and the Secretary of War is hereby authorized to cause to be furnished to the paymasters of the respective districts, such surplus of clothing as he may deem expedient, which clothing shall, under his direction, be furnished to the soldiers, when necessary, at the contract prices, and accounted for by them out of their arrears of monthly pay.

Sec, 9. And be it further enacted, That the President of the United States cause to be arranged, the officers, non-commissioned officers, musicians and privates of the several corps of troops now in the service of the United States, in such a manner as to form and complete, out of the same, the corps aforesaid; and cause the supernumerary officers, non-commissioned officers, musicians and privates to be discharged from the service of the United States from and after the first day of April next, or as soon thereafter as circumstances may permit

Sec. 10. And be it further enacted, That the officers, non-commissioned officers, musicians and privates of the said corps, shall be governed by the rules and articles of war, which have been established by the United States in Congress assembled, or by such rules and articles as may be hereafter, by law, established : Provided nevertheless, that the sentence of general courts martial, extending to the loss of life, the dismission of a commissioned officer, or which shall respect the general officer, shall, with the whole of the proceedings of such casts, respectively, be laid before the President of the United States, who is hereby authorized to direct the same to be carried into execution, or otherwise, as he shall judge proper.

Sec. 11. And be it further enacted, That the commissioned officers who shall be employed in the recruiting service, to keep up by voluntary enlistment, the corps as aforesaid, shall be entitled to receive for every effective able-bodied citizen of the United States, who shall be duly enlisted by him for the term of five years, and mustered, of at least five feet sis inches high, and between the ages of eighteen and thirty-five years, the sum of two dollars : Provided nevertheless, that this regulation, so far as respects the height and age of the recruit, shall not extend to musicians or to those soldiers who may re-enlist into the service : And provided also, that no person under the age of twenty-one years shall be enlisted by any officer, or held in the service of the United States, without the consent of his parent, guardian or master first had and obtained, if any he have; and if any officer shall enlist any person contrary to the true intent and meaning of this act,—for every such offence, he shall forfeit and pay the amount of the bounty and clothing which the person so recruited may have received from the public, to be deducted out of the pay and emoluments of such officer.

Sec. 12. And be it further enacted, That there shall be allowed and paid to each effective able-bodied citizen, recruited as aforesaid, to serve for the term of five years, a bounty of twelve dollars; but the payment of six dollars of the said bounty shall be deferred until he shall be mustered and have joined the corps in which be is to serve.

Sec. 13. And be it farther enacted, That the said corps shall be paid in such manner, that the arrears shall, at no time, exceed two months, unless the circumstances of the case shall render it unavoidable.

Sec- 14- And be it farther enacted, That if any officer, non-commissioned officer, musician or private, in the corps composing the peace establishment shall be disabled by wounds or otherwise, while in the line of his duty in public service, he shall be placed on the list of invalids of the United States, at such rate of pay, and under such regulations, as may be directed by the President of the United States for the time being : Provided always, that the compensation to be allowed for such wounds or disabilities, to a commissioned officer, shall not exceed for the highest rate of disability half the monthly pay of such officer, at the time of his being disabled or wounded; and that no officer shall receive more than the half pay of a lieutenant-colonel; and that the rate of compensation to non-commissioned officers, musicians and privates, shall not exceed five dollars per month: And provided also, that all inferior disabilities shall entitle the person so disabled to receive an allowance proportionate to the highest disability.

Sec. 15. And be it further enacted, That if any commissioned officer in the military peace establishment of the United States, shall, while in the service of the United States, die, by reason of any wound received in actual service of the United States, and leave a widow, or if no widow, a child or children under sixteen years of age, such widow, or if no widow, such child or children shall be entitled to and receive half the monthly pay, to which the deceased was entitled at the time of his death, for and during the term of five years. But in case of the death or intermarriage of such widow, before the expiration of the said term of five years, the half pay, for the remainder of the time, shall go to the child or children of such deceased officer: Provided always, that such half pay shall cease on the decease of such child or children.

Sec. 16. And be it further enacted, That, the paymaster shall perform the duties of his office, agreeably to the direction of the President of the United States, for the time being; and before he enters on the duties of the same, shall give bonds, with good and sufficient sureties, in such sums as the President shall direct, for the faithful discharge of his said office; and shall take an oath to execute the duties thereof with fidelity; and it shall, moreover, be his duly to appoint from the line, with the approbation of the President of the United States, the several paymasters to districts and assistants prescribed by this act; and he is hereby authorized to require the said paymaster to districts, and assistants, to enter into bonds, with good and sufficient surety, for the faithful discharge of their respective duties.

Sec. 17. And be it further enacted, That it shall be the duty of the military agents, designated by this "act, to purchase, receive, and forward to their proper destination, all military stores, and other articles for the troops in their respective departments, and all goods and annuities for the Indians, which they may be directed to purchase, or which shall be ordered into their care by the department of war. They shall account with the department of war, annually, for all the public property which may pass through their hands, and all the monies which they may expend in discharge of the duties of their offices, respectively : previous to their entering on the duties of their offices, they shall give bonds, with sufficient sureties, in such sums as the President of the United States shall direct, for the faithful discharge of the trust reposed in them; and shall take an oath faithfully to perform the duties of. their respective offices.

Sec. 18. And be it further enacted, That if any non-commissioned officer, musician or private, shall desert the service of the United States, he shall, in addition to the penalties mentioned in the rules and articles of war, be liable to serve, for and during such a period, as shall, with the time he may have served previous to his desertion, amount to the full term of his enlistment; and such soldier shall and may be tried by a court martial, and punished, although the term of his enlistment may have elapsed previous to his being apprehended or tried.

Sec. 19. And be it further enacted, That every person who shall procure or entice a soldier in the service of the United States to desert, or who shall purchase from any soldier, his arms, uniform clothing, or any part thereof; and every captain or commanding officer of any ship or vessel, who shall enter on board such ship or vessel, as one of his crew, knowing him to have deserted, or otherwise carry away any such soldier, or shall refuse to deliver him up to the orders of his commanding officer, shall, upon legal conviction, be fined at the discretion of any court having cognizance of the same, in any sum not exceeding three hundred dollars, or be imprisoned any term not exceeding one year.

Sec. 20. And be it further enacted, That every officer, non-commissioned officer, musician and private, shall take and subscribe the following oath or affirmation, to wit: "I, A. B. do solemnly swear or affirm, (as the case may be) that I will bear true faith and allegiance to the United States of America, and that I will serve them honestly and faithfully against their enemies or opposers, whomsoever; and that I will observe and obey the orders of the President of the United States, and the orders of the officers appointed over me, according to the rules and articles of war."

Sec. 21. And be it further enacted, That whenever a general court martial shall be ordered, the President of the United States may appoint some fit person to act as judge advocate, who shall be allowed, in addition to his other pay, one dollar and twenty-five cents for every day he shall be necessarily employed in the duties of the said court; and in cases where the President shall not have made such appointment, the brigadier-general or the president of the court may make the same.

Sec. 22. And be it further enacted, That where any commissioned officer shall be obliged to incur any extra expense in travelling and sitting on general courts martial, he shall be allowed a reasonable compensation for such extra expense actually incurred, not exceeding one dollar and twenty-five cents per day, to officers who are not entitled to forage, and not exceeding one dollar per day to such as shall be entitled to forage.

Sec. 23. And be it further enacted, That no non-commissioned officer, musician or private shall be arrested, or subject to arrest, or to be taken in execution for any debt under, the sum of twenty dollars, contracted before enlistment, nor for any debt contracted after enlistment.

Sec. 24. And be it further enacted, That whenever any officer or soldier shall be discharged from the service, except by way of punishment for any offence, he shall be allowed his pay and rations, or an equivalent in money, for such term of time as shall be sufficient for him to travel from the place of discharge to the place of his residence, computing at the rate of twenty miles to a day.

Sec. 25. And be it further enacted, That to each commissioned officer, who shall be deranged by virtue of this act, there shall be allowed and paid, in addition to the pay and emoluments to which they will be entitled by law at the time of their discharge—to each officer whose term of service in any military corps of the United States shall not have exceeded three years, three months' pay; to all other officers so deranged, one month's pay of their grades, respectively, for each year of past service in the army of the United States, or in any regiment or corps now or formerly in the service thereof.

Sec. 26. And be it further enacted, That the President of the United States is hereby authorized and empowered, when he shall deem it expedient, to organize and establish a corps of engineers, to consist of one engineer, with the pay, rank and emoluments of a major; two assistant engineers, with the pay, rank and emoluments of captains; two other assistant engineers, with the pay, rank and emoluments of first lieutenants; two other assistant engineers, with the pay, rank and emoluments of second lieutenants; and ten cadets, with the pay of sixteen dollars per month, and two rations per day: and the President of the United States is, in like manner, authorized, when he shall deem it proper, to make such promotions in the said corps, with a view to particular merit, and without regard to rank, so as not to exceed one colonel, one lieutenant-colonel, two majors, four captains, four first lieutenants, four second lieutenants, and so as that the number of the whole corps shall, at no time, exceed twenty officers and cadets.

Sec. 27. And be it further enacted. That the said corps, when so organized, shall be stationed at West Point in the state of New York, and shall constitute a military academy; and the engineers, assistant engineers, and cadets of the said corps, shall be subject, at all times, to do duty in such places, and on such service, as the President of the United States shall direct.

Sec. 28. And be it further enacted. That the principal engineer, and in his absence the next in rank, shall have the superintendence of the said military academy, under the direction of the President of the United States; and the Secretary of War is hereby authorized, at the public expense, under such regulations as shall be directed by the President of the United States, to procure the necessary, books, implements and apparatus for the use and benefit of the said institution.

Sec. 29. And be it further enacted. That so much of any act or acts, now in force, as comes within the purview of this act, shall be, and the same is hereby repealed; saving, nevertheless, such parts thereof, as relate to the enlistments or term of service of any of the troops, which, by this act, are continued on the present military establishment of the United States.

Approved, March 16, 1802.

-- Thomas Jefferson (signature)

== See also ==
- Compact Clause of U.S. Constitution – Laws governing military
- Federalism in the United States
- United States Army Corps of Engineers
- Militia Acts of 1792
- Continental Army
- Standing army

== Bibliography ==
- Ambrose, Stephen (1966). Duty, Honor, Country: A History of West Point. Johns Hopkins University Press, 377 pages. ISBN 9780801862939.
- Doyle, William (2009). Aristocracy and its Enemies in the Age of Revolution. Oxford University Press. ISBN 9780191568275.
- Lookingbill, Brad D. (2010). American Military History. John Wiley & Sons. ISBN 9781405190527.
- McDonald, Robert M. S. (2004). Thomas Jefferson's Military Academy: Founding West Point. Jeffersonian America. University of Virginia Press. ISBN 978-0-8139-2298-0.
- Muehlbauer, Matthew S.; Ulbrich, David J. (2013). Ways of War: American Military History from the Colonial Era to the Twenty-First Century. Routledge, New York. ISBN 978-1-136-75604-7.
- Nester, William (2013). The Jeffersonian vision, 1801–1815: The Art of American Power During the Early Republic. Potomac Books, Inc., 294 pages. ISBN 9781597976763.
- Scythes, James (2014). Spencer C. Tucker (ed.). The Encyclopedia of the Wars of the Early American Republic, 1783–1812 A Political, Social, and Military History. Santa Barbara, California: ABC-CLIO. ISBN 978-1-59884-156-5.
- "United States Military Academy at West Point". Thomas Jefferson Foundation.
- "To Thomas Jefferson from Henry Dearborn, 9 April 1802". U.S. national Archives.
- "Thomas Jefferson to the Senate, 25 March 1802". U.S. National Archives.

=== Further reading ===
- Crackel, Theodore J., "Jefferson, Politics, and the Army: An Examination of the Military Peace Establishment Act of 1802." Journal of the Early Republic 2 (April 1982): 21–37.
- ——, "The Founding of West Point: Jefferson and the Politics of Security." Armed Forces and Society 7 (Summer 1981): 529–43.
