= Militia Acts of 1792 =

1792 U.S. laws

- Other short titles: Calling Forth Act (First Act), Uniform Militia Act (Second Act)
- Long title: An Act to provide for calling forth the Militia to execute the laws of the Union, suppress insurrections and repel invasions; An Act more effectually to provide for the National Defence by establishing an Uniform Militia throughout the United States
- Enacted by: the 2nd United States Congress
- Effective: May 2, 1792 (First Act); May 8, 1792 (Second Act)

Citations
- Statutes at Large: 1 Stat. 264 (First Act); 1 Stat. 271 (Second Act)

Legislative history
- Signed into law by President George Washington on; May 2, 1792 (First Act); May 8, 1792 (Second Act)

United States Supreme Court cases
- Martin v. Mott (1827); Houston v. Moore (1820)

Two Militia Acts, enacted by the 2nd United States Congress in 1792, provided for the organization of militia and empowered the president of the United States to take command of the state militia in times of imminent invasion or insurrection.

The president's authority had a life of two years and was invoked to suppress the Whiskey Rebellion in 1794. In 1795, Congress enacted the Militia Act of 1795, which mirrored the provisions of the expired 1792 Acts, except that the president's authority to call out the militias was made permanent. The Militia Act of 1862, enacted during the American Civil War, amended the conscription provision of the 1792 and 1795 acts, which originally applied to every "free able-bodied white male citizen" between the ages of 18 and 45, to allow African-Americans to serve in the militias. The new conscription provision applied to all males, regardless of race, between the ages of 18 and 54. The Militia Act of 1903 repealed and superseded the Militia Act of 1795 and established the United States National Guard as the body of the "organized militia" in the United States.

== Background ==
The Militia act's origins can be traced to "An Act for ordering the Forces in the several Counties of this Kingdom" by the English Parliament in 1665.

A committee was formed on April 7, 1783, headed by Alexander Hamilton, also including James Madison, to determine what the Military Peace Establishment of the country should be post-revolution. Hamilton first presented the committee's plan on June 18, just two days before what would become known as the Pennsylvania Mutiny of 1783. After Congress reestablished itself in Trenton, New Jersey, the committee's altered report was presented on October 23.

It was understood at the time that the president did not have the independent power under the United States Constitution to call out the militia and required statutory authorization by United States Congress to do so.

The Militia Acts were passed following the enormous losses suffered by General Arthur St. Clair's forces at the Battle of the Wabash in 1791, when nearly 1,000 Americans died in battle against the Western Confederacy of American Indians. There was widespread fear that Indian forces would exploit their victory during the recess of Congress. St. Clair's defeat was partly blamed on his army's poor organization and equipment. Upon the final required ratification enabling the Second Amendment reaching Congress January 8, 1792, Congress passed the Militia acts that May, the second on the last day before adjournment.

== First Militia Act of 1792 ==
The first Militia Act was passed on May 2, 1792, and provided authority to the president to call out militias of the several states, "whenever the United States shall be invaded, or be in imminent danger of invasion from any foreign nation or Indian tribe". (art. I, ss. 1)

The Act also authorized the president to call the militias into federal service "whenever the laws of the United States shall be opposed or the execution thereof obstructed, in any state, by combinations too powerful to be suppressed by the ordinary course of judicial proceedings, or by the powers vested in the marshals by this act". (art. I, ss. 2) This provision likely referred to uprisings such as Shays' Rebellion.

The president's authority in both cases was conditional on the president, by proclamation, ordering the insurgents "to disperse, and retire peaceably to their respective abodes, within a limited time."

The president's authority in both cases was to expire at the end of the session of Congress after two years. By the Militia Act of 1795, Congress re-enacted the provisions of the 1792 Act, except that the president's authority to call out militias was made permanent.

== Second Militia Act of 1792 ==
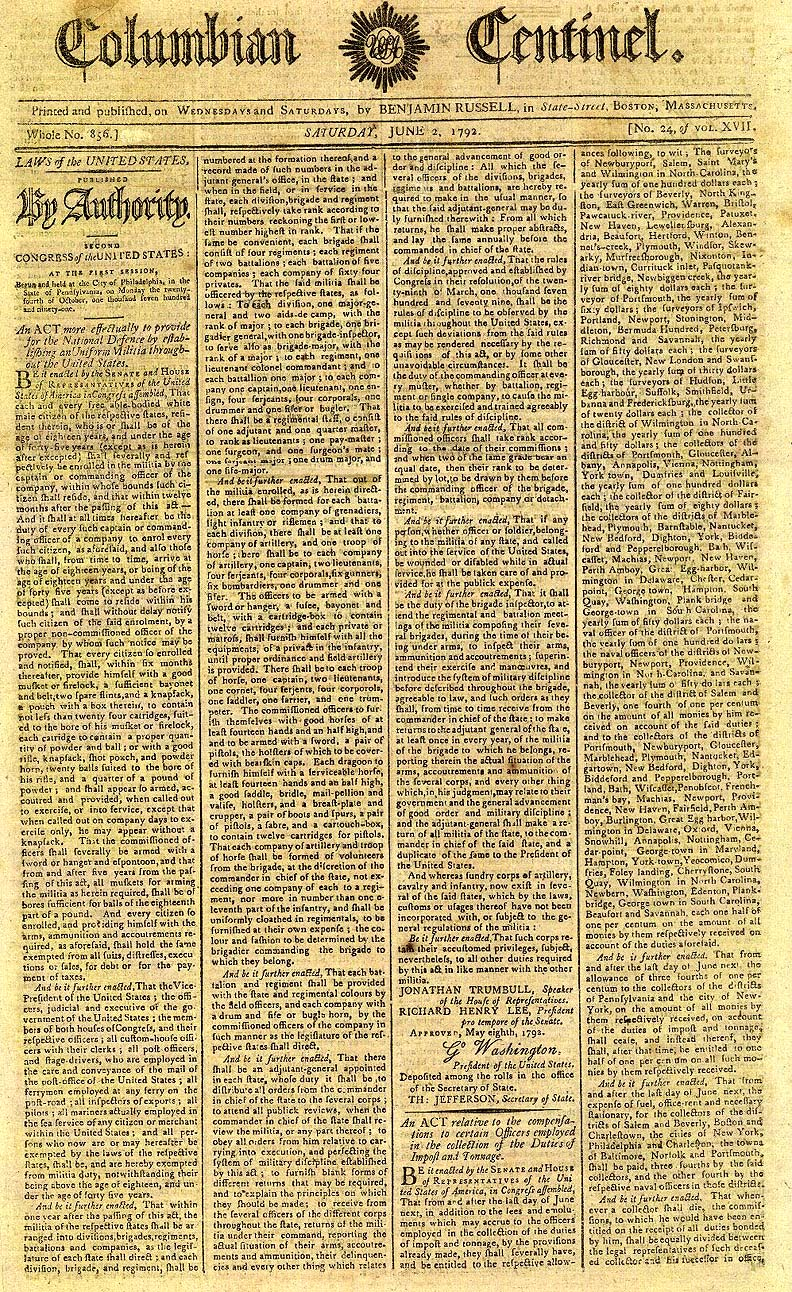
Front page of a newspaper announcing the second Militia Act of 1792.

The second Militia Act of 1792 was passed on May 8, 1792, and provided for the organization of state militias and the conscription of every "free able-bodied white male citizen" between the ages of 18 and 45:

... each and every free able-bodied white male citizen of the respective States, resident therein, who is or shall be of age of eighteen years, and under the age of forty-five years (except as is herein after excepted) shall severally and respectively be enrolled in the militia, by the Captain or Commanding Officer of the company, within whose bounds such citizen shall reside ...

Militia members were required to equip themselves with a musket, bayonet and belt, two spare flints, a box able to contain not less than 24 suitable cartridges, and a knapsack. Alternatively, everyone enrolled was to provide himself with a rifle, a powder horn, ¼ pound of gunpowder, 20 rifle balls, a shot-pouch, and a knapsack. Exemptions applied to some occupations, including members of Congress, stagecoach drivers, and ferryboatmen.

The militias were divided into "divisions, brigades, regiments, battalions, and companies" as the state legislatures would direct. The provisions of the first Act governing the calling up of the militia by the president in case of invasion or obstruction to law enforcement were continued in the second act. The statute authorized court martial proceedings against militia members who disobeyed orders.

== Use and subsequent amendments ==
George Washington was the first president to call out the militia in 1794 (just before the 1792 act expired) to put down the Whiskey Rebellion in Western Pennsylvania. Washington issued a proclamation on August 7, 1794, that invoked the act and called out 13,000 militiamen to put down the rebellion.

Congress passed the Militia Act of 1795, which by and large mirrored the provisions of the expired 1792 act but made the president's authority to call out the militias permanent.

The Militia Act of 1808 provided funding for arms and equipment to state militias. The Militia Act of 1795 was, in turn, amended by the Militia Act of 1862, which allowed African-Americans to serve in the militias.

The 1792 and 1795 acts left the question of state versus federal militia control unresolved. Consequently, the federal government could not consistently rely on the militias for national defense. For example, during the War of 1812, members of the New York militia refused to take part in operations against the British in Canada, arguing that their only responsibility was to defend their home state. On another occasion, the Governor of Vermont unsuccessfully attempted to recall his state's militia from the defense of Plattsburgh, claiming that it was illegal for them to operate outside Vermont.

As a result, starting with the War of 1812, the federal government would create "volunteer" units when it needed to expand the size of the regular Army. These volunteer units were not militia, though they often consisted of whole militia units that had volunteered en masse nor were they part of the regular Army. They did, however, come under direct federal control. This solution was also employed during the Mexican–American War (1846–48), and in the Union Army during the American Civil War (1861–65). Some volunteer units were also organized during the Spanish–American War (1898). The federal government also mobilized several National Guard units which volunteered en masse and were accepted as volunteer units.

The 1795 act was superseded by the Militia Act of 1903, which established the United States National Guard as the chief body of organized military reserves in the United States.

== See also ==
- Insurrection Act of 1807
- Militia Act of 1808
- Posse Comitatus Act of 1878
- Militia Act of 1903
- Military Peace Establishment Act
